= Judith Alpi =

Chilean painter (1893–1983)

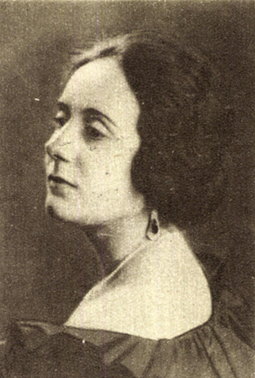
- Born: March 3, 1893; Santiago
- Died: February 5, 1983 (aged 89); Santiago
- Known for: Portraiture
- Notable work: Portraits of Laura Rodig; the work White Kimono
- Movement: Generación del 13

Judith Alpi Ghirardi (3 March 1893 - 5 February 1983) was a Chilean painter and teacher, who was known for her work in portraiture. A member of Generación del 13, she exhibited nationally and internationally and was awarded prizes for her works. She produced several highly regarded portraits of the artist Laura Rodig.

== Biography ==
Alpi was born in Santiago on 3 March 1893. She studied at the School of Fine Arts in Santiago, where she was taught by Fernando Álvarez de Sotomayor, Juan Francisco González and Alberto Valenzuela Llanos. Known for her portraiture, and self-portraiture, she became a member of the movement known as Generación del 13.

During this time Alpi was painted by Elmina Moisan. Along with Moisan, Alpi exhibited her work alongside Ximena Morla de Subercaseaux, Sara Camino (es), Dora Puelma and Miriam Sanfuentes from 1915 to 1916. These works were shown in what were termed the 'Salons of Santaiago' and Alpi was one of the first six artists to exhibit in them. Prizes were awarded to Alpi, including: third prize medal in 1915; second prize in 1919, the portrait prize in 1924, and the first prize medal in 1926. She also exhibited internationally, for example at the Ibero-American Exhibition in Seville in 1929, where her work White Kimono was awarded a prize. She also showed work at the Exhibition of Contemporary Chilean Paintings and Sculptures in Buenos Aires in 1953.

Alpi was a lecturer at the School of Plastic Arts at Liceo Nº1 de Niñas in Santiago. She was also a founder National Society of Fine Arts, together with the painters Juan Francisco González and Pedro Reszka. She died in Santiago on 5 February 1983.

== Legacy ==
In 2017 the Chilean National Museum of Fine Arts exhibited one of Alpi's portraits of the artist Laura Rodig as part of the exhibition Ellas por ellas mismas. Her work today is recognised for its focus on women's identity - in particular the Rodig portraits are known for how they depict the complexity of the artist's character.
