= Dora Puelma =

Chilean painter, sculptor and writer (1898–1972)

Dora Puelma Francino de Fuenzalida (Antofagasta, March 22, 1898 - Santiago, April 1, 1972) was a Chilean painter, sculptor and writer who belonged to the Generación del 13. Her work was characterized by "fidelidad a la tradición pictórica del paisaje y las técnicas de la representación que siempre defendió por sobre las tendencias abstractas que se impusieron en su época" (fidelity to the pictorial tradition of landscape painting and the techniques of representation that she always defended over the abstract tendencies that prevailed in her time), which is why her work was included within Chilean pictorial naturalism that she approached mainly through the use of oil and watercolor techniques.

After entering the School of Fine Arts, she was a student of Fernando Álvarez de Sotomayor y Zaragoza, Alberto Valenzuela Llanos, Juan Francisco González, and Pablo Burchard, while in the field of sculpture, she was a disciple of Virginio Arias. Along with Elmina Moisan, Ximena Morla Lynch, Sara Malvar, Judith Alpi, and Miriam Sanfuentes, Puelma was one of the first six Chilean painters to exhibit her work at the beginning of the 20th century; particularly, Puelma did so collectively in 1914 during the Exposición de Arte Femenino de la Sociedad Artística Femenina (Women's Art Exhibition of the Women's Artistic Society) in Santiago, and later in the Official Salons of Santiago in 1916, where she also participated in 1919, 1925, 1927, 1938, 1942, 1943, 1947, 1948, 1948, 1949, 1952, 1954, 1955 and 1957.

Puelma also participated in other group exhibitions, among them the one held at the Ibero-American Exposition of 1929–30, where she received the bronze medal in painting.

== Selected works ==
=== Artworks in public collections ===
- Chilean National Museum of Fine Arts
  - The perfect confidante, Drawing on paper, 54 by 44 centimetres (21 in × 17 in)
  - Paisaje, Oil on canvas, 50 by 38 centimetres (20 in × 15 in)
  - Mañana de primavera, Oil on canvas, 65 by 75 centimetres (26 in × 30 in)

=== Books ===
- Pinceladas de Europa, 1954
