= Pinochet (surname) =

Pinochet is a French surname. It is also the name of a family in Chile. Notable people with the surname include:

== First surname ==
- Augusto Pinochet (1915–2006), military dictator of Chile in 1973–1990
- Gregorio Pinochet (1849–1899), Chilean journalist and politician
- Lucia Pinochet (born 1943), Chilean teacher, daughter of Augusto Pinochet
- Rafael Pinochet (1898–1989), Chilean politician
- Ruperto Pinochet (1896–1963), Chilean agriculturist and politician
- Tancredo Pinochet (1880–1957), Chilean writer and politician, son of Isabel Le Brun de Pinochet

== Second surname ==
- Eulogio Robles Pinochet (1831–1891), Chilean Army officer
- Ramón Silva Pinochet (fl. 1920s, Chilean politician

== Marital surname ==
- Isabel Le Brun de Pinochet (1845–1930), Chilean educationist
- Lucía Hiriart de Pinochet (1923–2021), wife of Augusto Pinochet
- Silvia Araya de Pinochet (1930–2021), Chilean-born Canadian painter
