= Casa del Arte =

Art museum in Concepción, Chile

Coordinates: 36°49′39″S 73°02′20″W

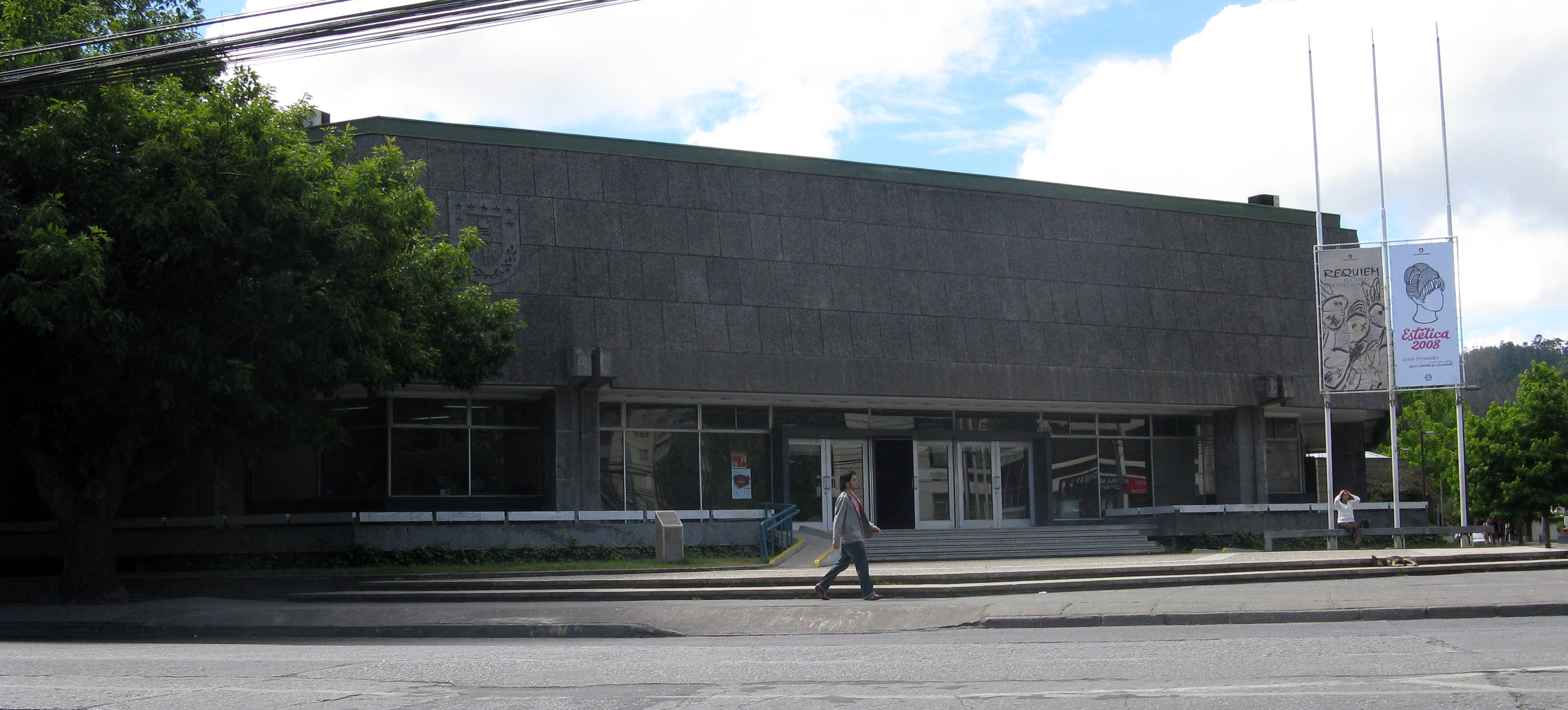
Front exterior view of the Casa del Arte.

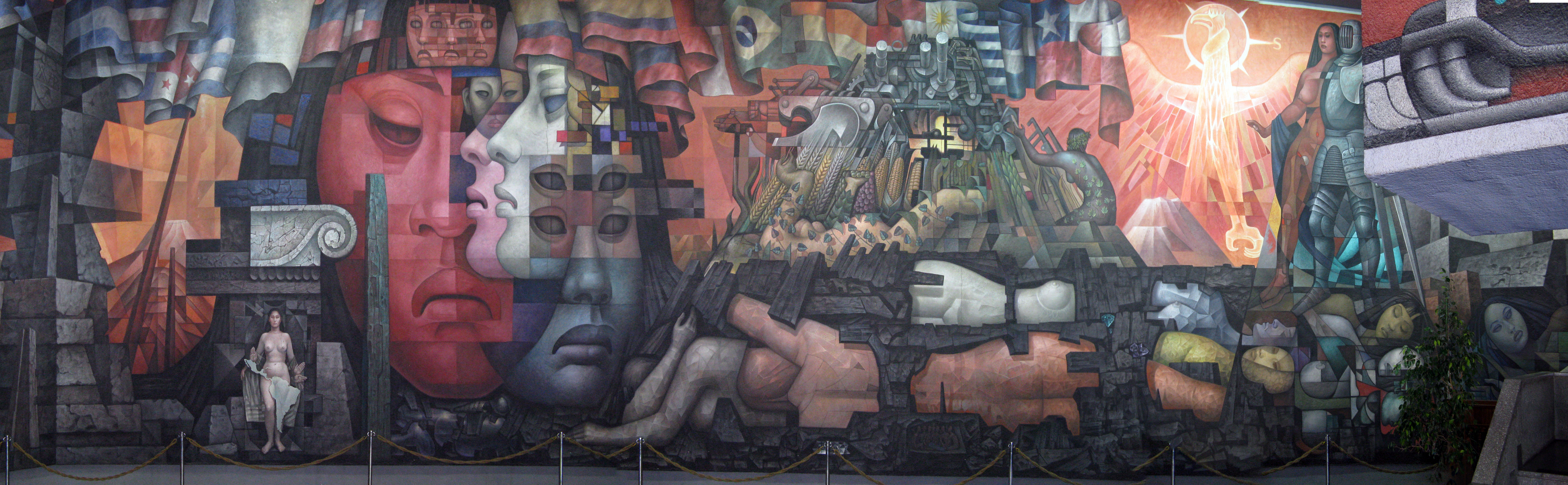
The mural Presencia de América Latina is located on the interior rear wall.

The Casa del Arte José Clemente Orozco (more commonly known simply as the Casa del Arte, "House of Art" or Pinacoteco, "Art Gallery") is a Chilean art museum on the campus of the University of Concepción, in Concepción. It is situated on the corner of Chacabuco and Larenas, facing the Plaza Perú. The gallery attracts approximately 75,000 visitors a year and houses the country's largest collection of paintings outside the capital city of Santiago, and the most complete collection of Chilean art with some 1,800 works. One of its main features is the mural Presencia de América Latina (1964) by the Mexican artist Jorge González Camarena, which is in the entrance hall.

== History ==
The need for an art collection was recognized from the foundation of the university in 1919, in large part as an educational benefit to the students. In 1929, the then rector, Enrique Molina Garmendia, proposed building a gallery, and in the 1950s Tole Peralta, a professor of art, lent impetus to the project. In January 1958, during the rectorship of David Stitchkin Branover, the university acquired an important collection of more than 500 Chilean paintings from the philanthropist Julio Vásquez Cortés. Construction of the building began in 1963, now with the additional objective of exhibiting the art to the whole community. The architects were Osvaldo Cáceres and Alejandro Rodríguez, and the building was originally intended to house the administrative offices of the university extension and the Department of Plastic Arts, as well as the art gallery. The site was an open space which had once contained the original university dental school, partly destroyed by the 1960 Valdivia earthquake.

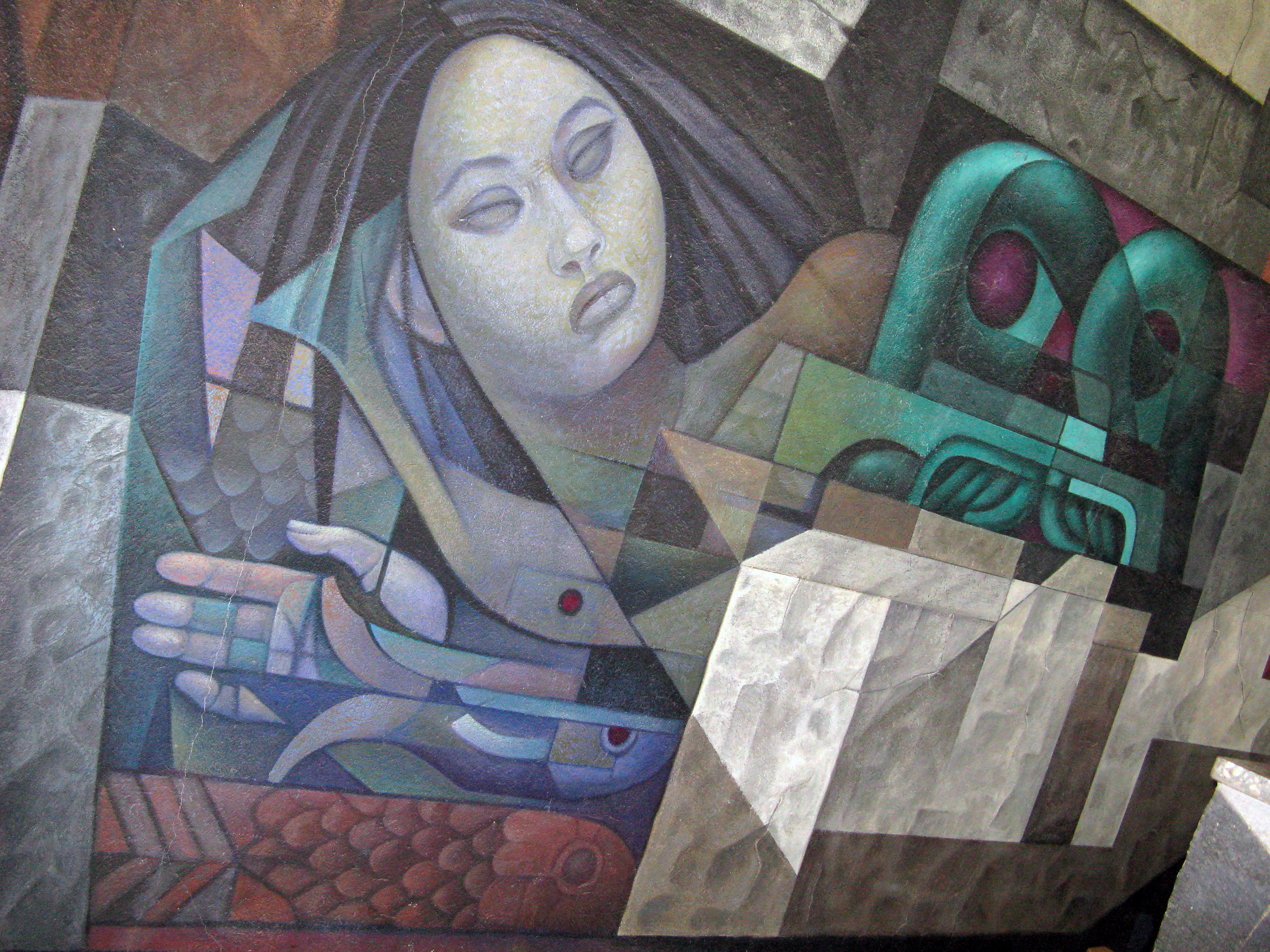
Part of the mural "Presencia de América Latina"

González Camarena worked on the mural from November 1964 to April 1965, and the building opened to the public in 1967. Since then the collection has grown considerably. Important gifts were received in 1984 from the family of Jorge Délano Frederick, a Chilean graphic artist and in 1994 from the Sociedad de Oleoducto Trasandino, a Chilean-Argentine conglomerate that celebrated its 75th anniversary with a donation of engravings by Oswaldo Guayasamín. Also, Lorena Villablanca donated many of her own works, and in 1999 engravings by Santos Chavez, with themes relating to the indigenous experience, were donated.

The Casa de Arte has also hosted a variety of events, including the first South American Workshop on Marine Biodiversity for the Census of Marine Life in 2002, the 13th International Conference of the Bryozoology Association in 2004 and exhibits and presentations by José Balmes, Valentina Cruz, and Nicanor Parra, the last attracting 20,000 people.

== Architecture and fittings ==
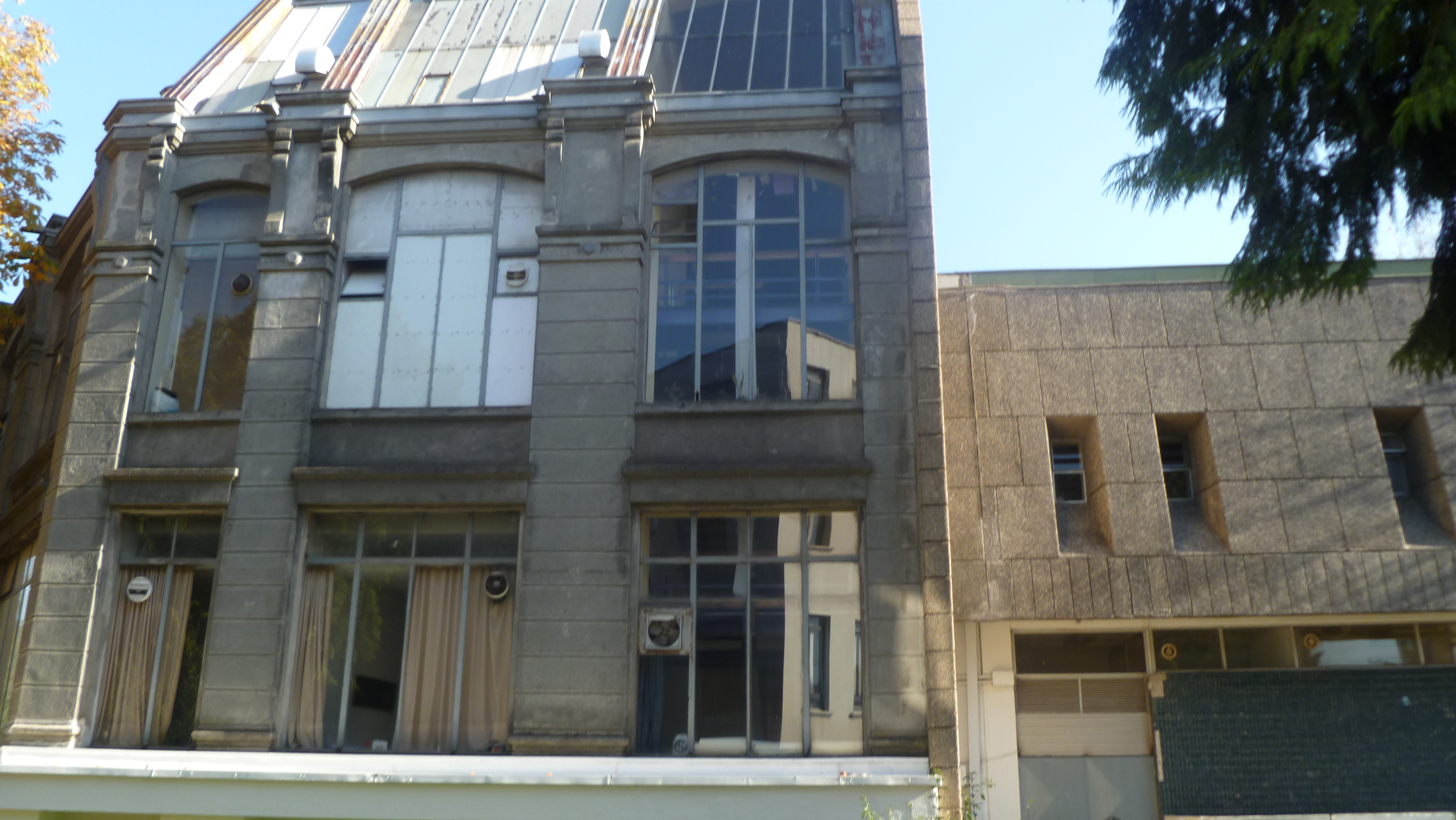
Side view of the Casa del Arte showing neoclassical architecture

The building is hexagonal in shape, with primary facades facing both the square and the remainder of the university, together with an entrance atrium from which a large window reveals the interior hall.

The architecture is a mix of styles, Art Nouveau in the front section and neoclassical at the rear, the result of the 1960 Valdivia earthquake. A skylight facing the campus illuminates the exhibition hall, while the main section of the building faces the Plaza Perú. One of the first trees planted in the university, a redwood, grows beside the museum. It has two floors; the upstairs spaces are wood-panelled.

== Collection ==
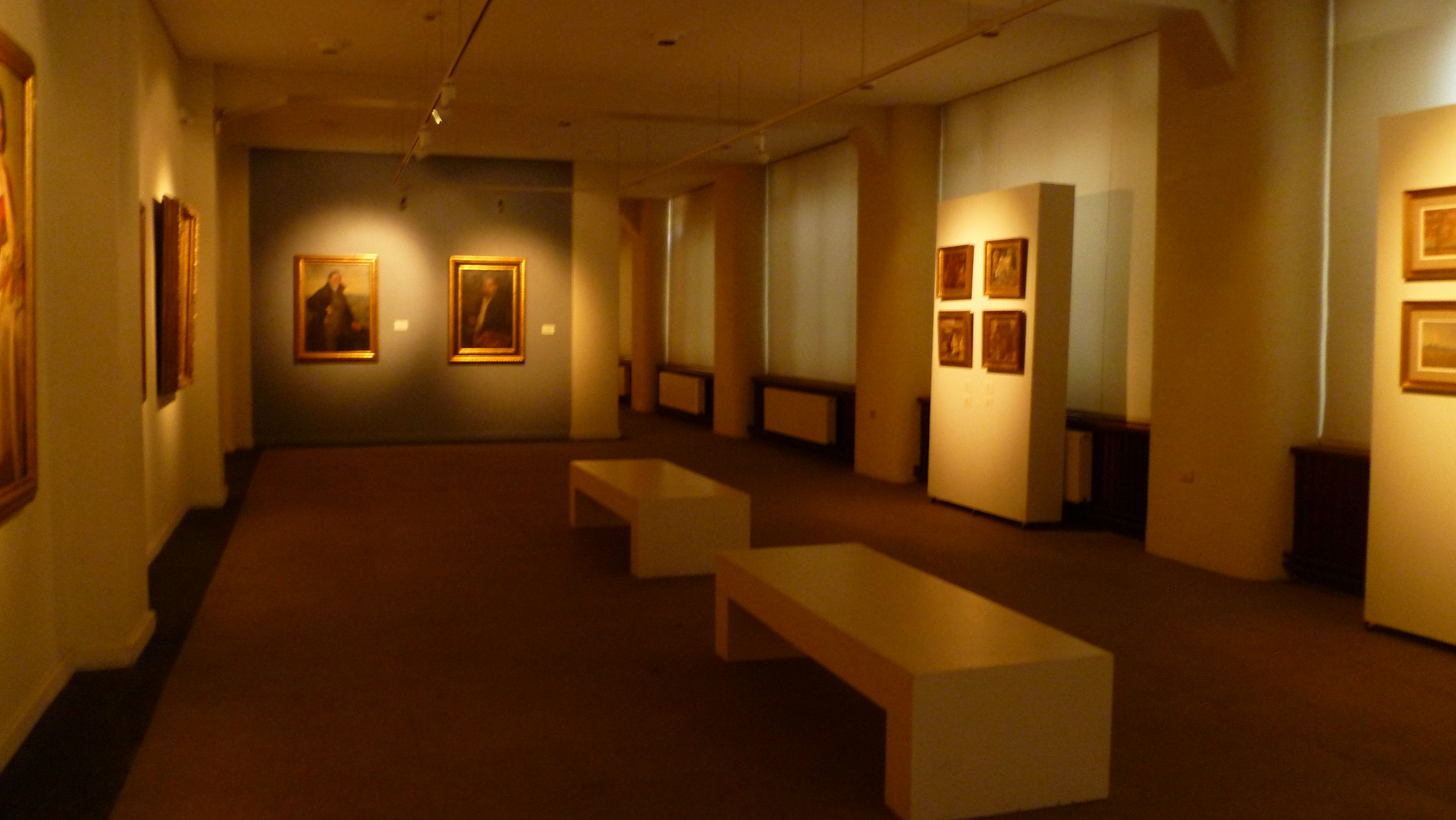
Sala generacion del trece (Generación del 13 Gallery)

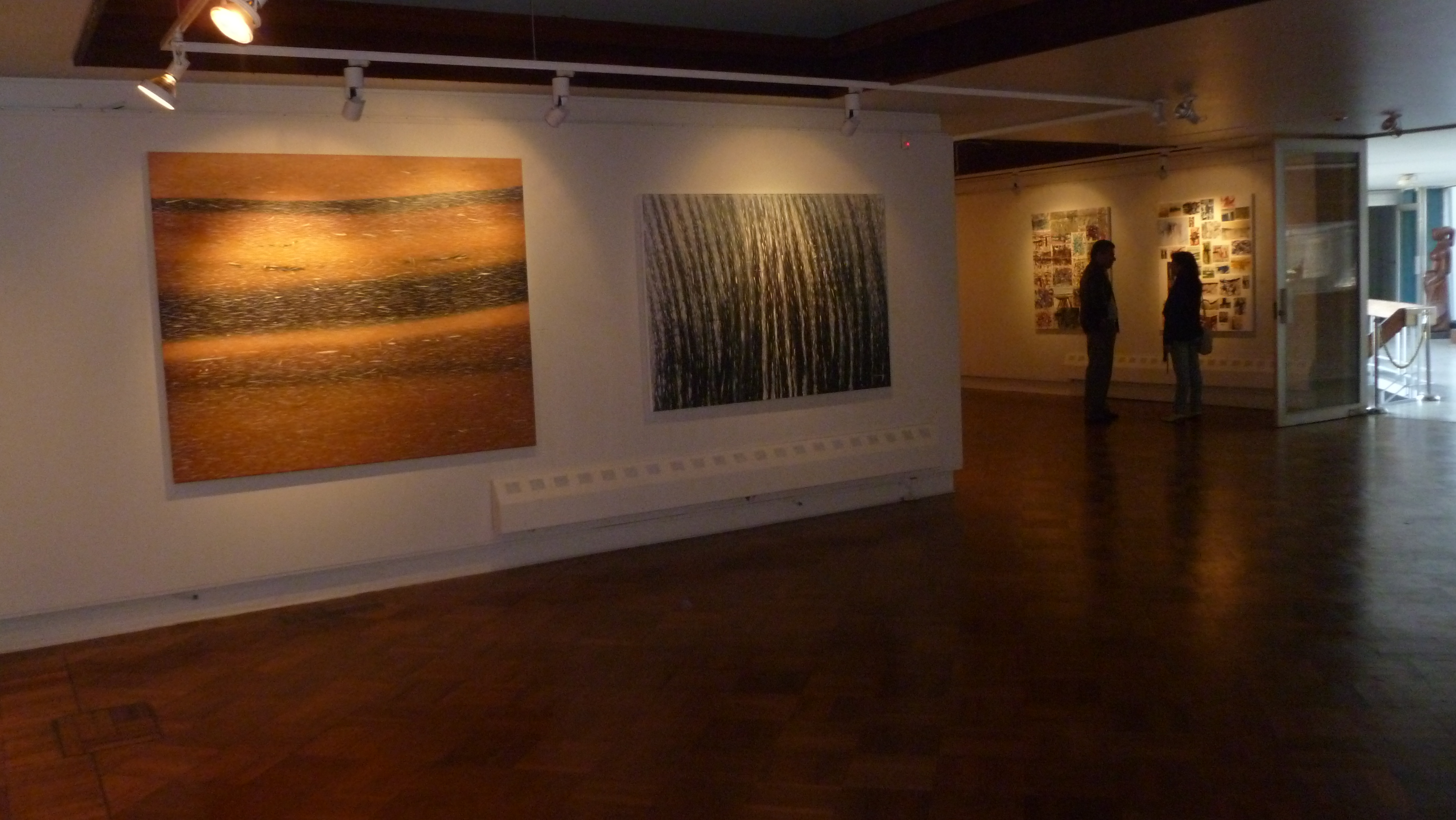
Sala Marta Colvin (Marta Colvin Gallery)

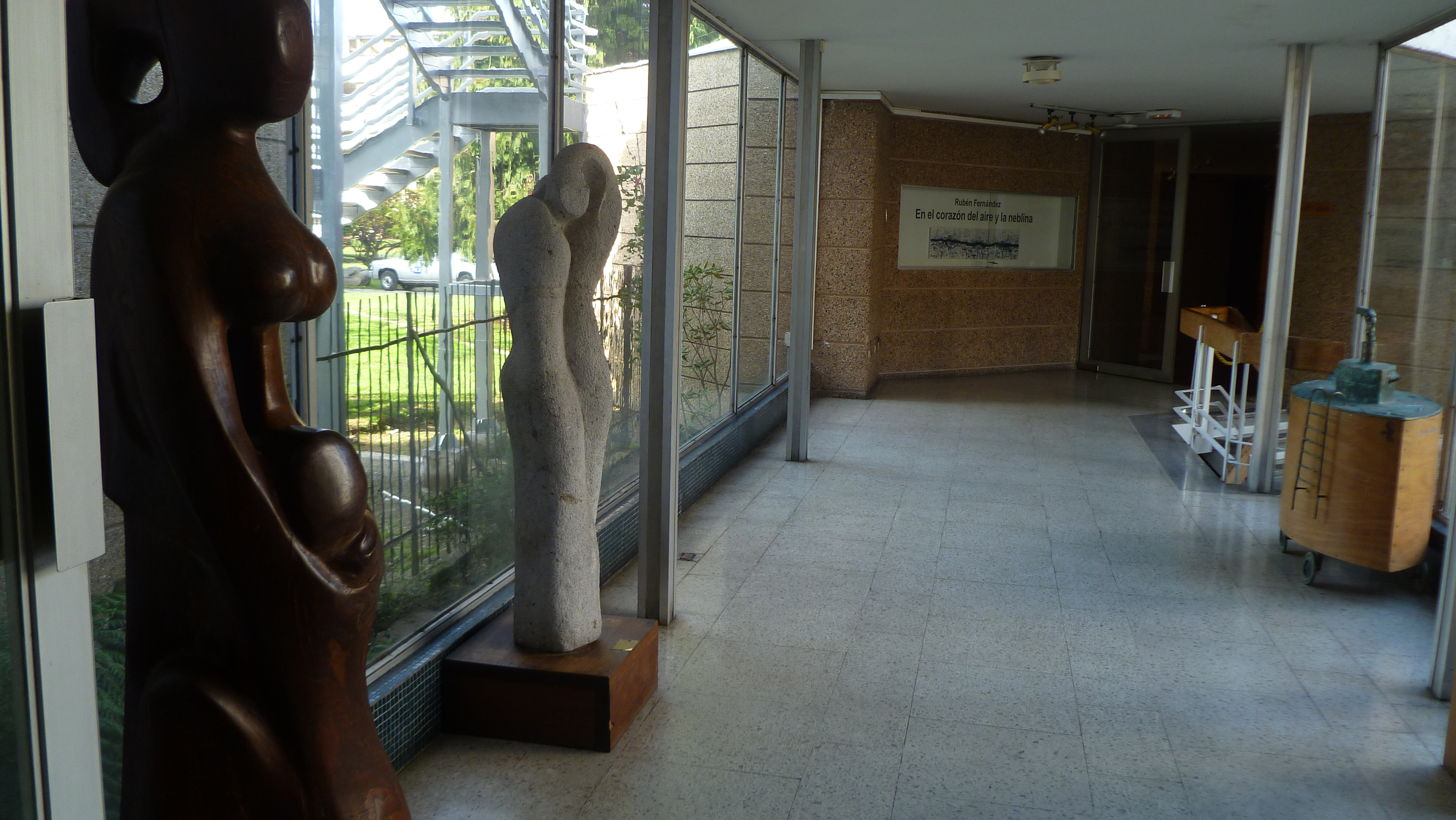
Corridor lined with windows

The art displays contain the largest collection of Chilean artists during the period from 19th to the 20th centuries. The collections include foreign artists. The Casa del Arte has the most complete collection of Chilean paintings, composed of works from different eras, from the colonial period to the most representative artists of the 19th and 20th centuries. The permanent exhibition on the upper floor includes works of Pedro Luna, Jorge Délano, Thomas Somerscales, Onofre Jarpa, Raymond Monvoisin, Celia Castro, and Agustín Abarca. There are two paintings by Gil de Castro, a nude by Alfredo Valenzuela Puelma, a landscape by Antonio Smith, and another landscape by Alberto Valenzuela Llanos.

The art museum maintains important work of Chilean art groups such as Generación del 13 and the Grupo Montparnasse. The gallery also houses temporary exhibitions on the ground floor.

The exhibit space consists of six main galleries, whose contents are either fixed or changing depending on their significance and the manner in which they were acquired. One of these is the atrium in which the mural is located. On the ground floor, the Sala Tole Peralta, named for the founder and first director of the Casa del Arte, assembles works of major Chilean painters in chronological order. The rectangular shape of the gallery enables the visitor to easily observe the evolution of Chilean art over time. This gallery is also equipped with tables and groups of antique chairs and has low artificial light so that visitors can rest there.

The Sala Generación del Trece, also on the ground floor, contains a permanent exhibit of paintings from that artistic movement, including the well known Pintor bohemio by Ezequiel Plaza and Velorio de un Angelito by Arturo Gordon. This gallery is the largest after the main hall.

On the upper floor, the Sala de los grandes maestros (gallery of great masters) is dedicated to masters of Chilean painting, including Alfredo Valenzuela Puelma's La ninfa de las cerezas, one of the most praised works of Chilean art. This gallery is polygonal in shape and formal in character; outside it, González Camarena's mural can be seen from a higher vantage point.

The Sala Marta Colvin, on the ground floor, is named for the Chilean sculptor and houses temporary exhibitions by artists invited by the Casa del Arte or the university. This space was also designed to be adaptable to varying kinds of performance, and is used, for example, for readings, discussions and poetry recitals.

On the basement level, reached by a corridor lined with windows, is the Sala CAP, named for the Compañía Siderúrgica Huachipato, which contributed to its remodeling. This is used for temporary exhibitions of contemporary art in any medium, including audiovisual art. The majority of these works are contemplative in nature, and the room's simple colors and architectural irregularity allow it to be totally modified to suit the needs of a particular show. This room also has no exterior light sources, inviting the visitor to meditate on the art. Audiovisual commentary is sometimes provided.

In addition, the Sala Universitaria, a basement space in the Plaza de Armas in the centre of Concepción, houses primarily works by regional artists. Since 2008, the University Extension has used it for an exhibit on the history of Chilean painting targeted particularly at children and teenagers.

The Presencia de América Latina mural was recognized by the Government of Chile as a National Historic Landmark under Decree Number 147 of April 30, 2009. Also in recognition of its heritage and cultural value to the conurbation of Greater Concepción and Bío Bío Region, it was one of the cultural artifacts recognized with a plaque in 2009 in celebration of the Bicentennial of Chile in 2010.
