= Antonia Tarragó =

Chilean activist

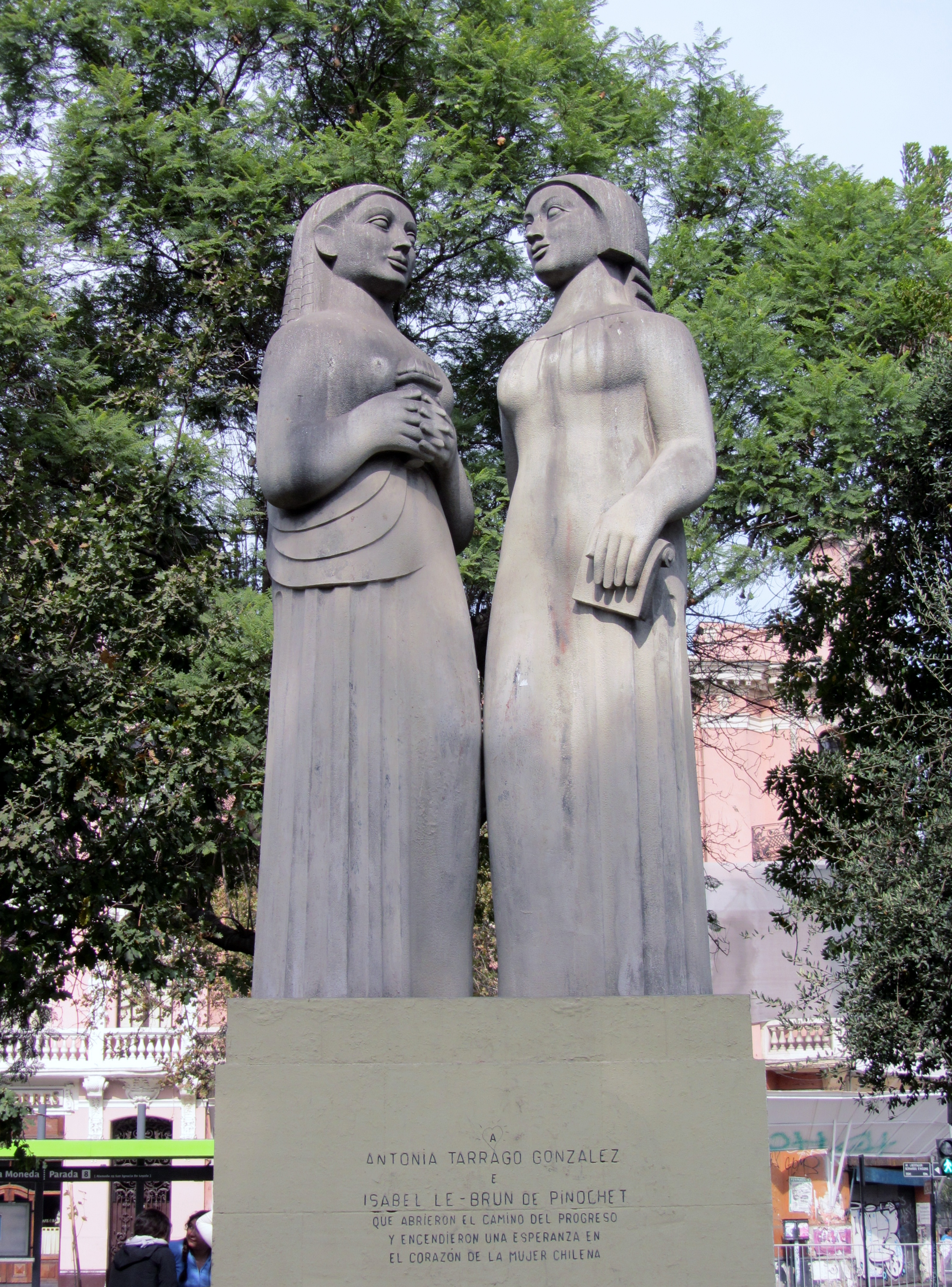
Samuel Román Rojas (1946) Monument to the educators Antonia Tarragó and Isabel Le Brun de Pinochet.

Antonia Tarragó González (1832-1916) was a Chilean feminist, activist and educator. She is known for her efforts to expand women's access to education in Chile.

== Early life and death ==
Antonia Tarragó was born in Chile in the year 1832. She was an educator and feminist activist most known for her efforts to expand education for women giving them the right to attend college. She died in 1916.

== Career ==
Antonia Tarragó founded the Santa Teresa school in Santiago de Chile in 1864 to give women the opportunity to attend high school and continue their education. Tarragó wanted women to further develop their intelligence and their psychological skills. Tarragó was motivated by her feeling that the level of education for women was scarce mainly because the Chilean government did not provide sufficient funds, as the Chilean society did not see women's education as important.

In 1872, Tarragó attempted to gain the government’s approval for the recognition of high school exams in order for girl's to apply to the University of Chile. Her pursuits were unsuccessful at this time. There was mass controversy inside the government as to whether they wanted women to pursue higher education and to remain in the role of homemakers. However, in 1877 with the joint efforts of Isabel Le Brun another educator, they founded the “Colegio de la Recoleta,” a school for women and with the change of government, the efforts of Antonia Tarragó were victorious.

On 6 February 1877, the Minister of Education Miguel Luis Amunátegui signed the Amunátegui Decree which allowed women for the first time to enter university and mandated the construction of public secondary schools.

== Legacy ==
In 1946, Samuel Román Rojas created the sculpture Monument to the educators Antonia Tarragó and Isabel Le Brun de Pinochet (Spanish: Monumento a las educadoras Antonia Tarragó e Isabel Le Brun de Pinochet) which stands at the central median of the Alameda in Santiago.
