= Generación del 13 =

Group of Chilean painters

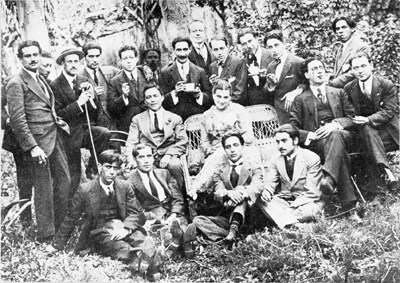
Members of The 13 Generation. From left to right, standing: Exequiel Plaza, Claudio de Alas, Tony Rogers (theatre operator), Alberto Lobos, Alberto Romero, Pedro Luna, José Backhaus, Lautaro García, Julio Ortiz de Zárate, Camilo Mori and Alfredo Lobos. Sitting in the middle: Julio Vásquez Cortés, Carmen Tórtola Valencia, Carlos Predes Saldías and Luis Johnson. Sitting on the floor: Enrique Lobos, Manuel Gallinato, Fernando Meza and Julio Walton.

Generación del 13 (Generación del Trece; The 13 Generation) was Chile's first painter collective. Its name derives from the year 1913, after a joint exhibition was held at the Salon of the Chilean newspaper El Mercurio in the preceding year. The group and its work are characterized by a fascination with Creole art and customs, social criticism, and portrayal of the proletariat, a subject that hitherto was not depicted in Chilean art.

== History ==
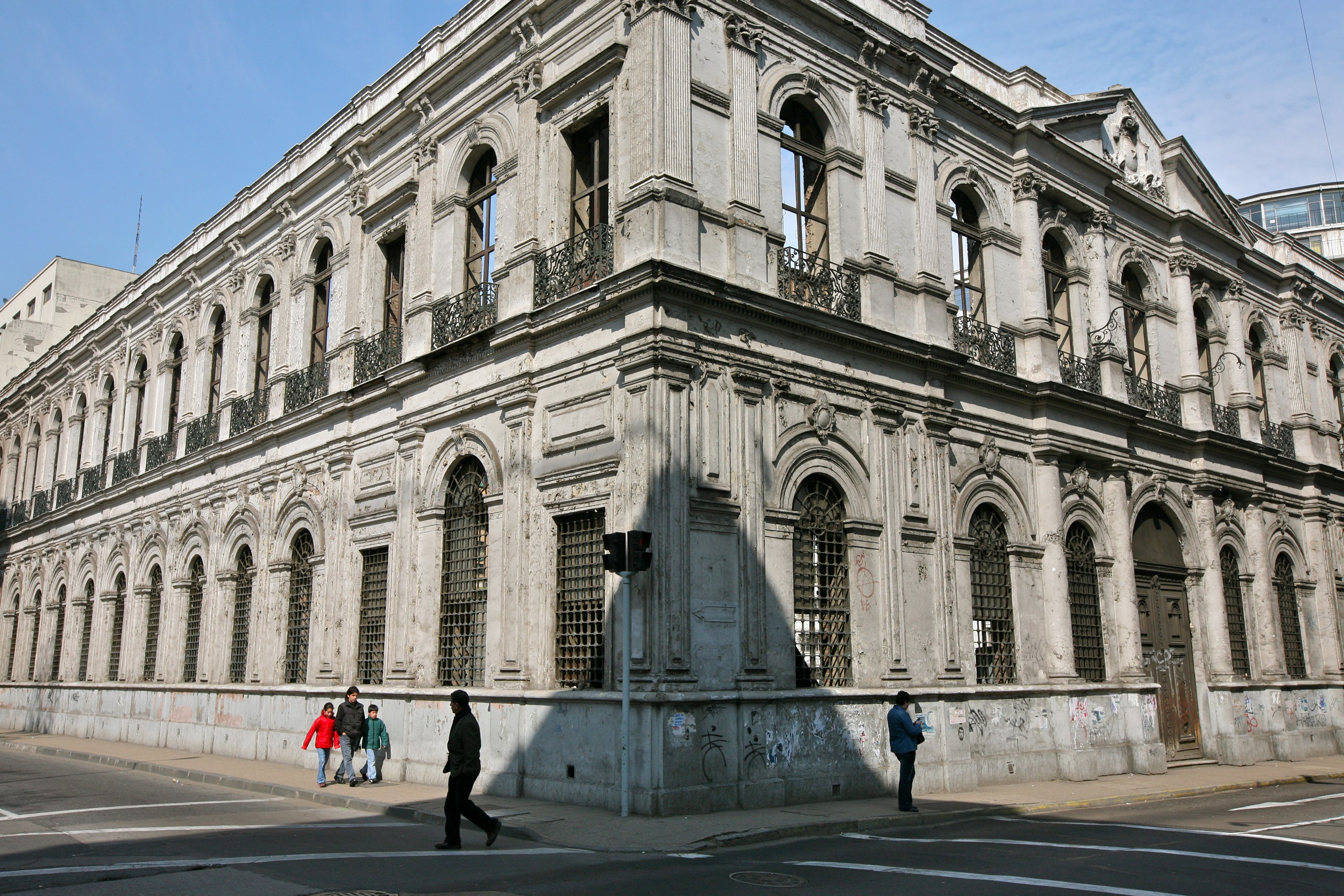
El Mercurio building

At the beginning of the 20th century, alongside the celebration of the first 100 years of independence, Chile experienced a period where art began to be more widely appreciated by many people (among the upper classes, at least). There was a rush to beautify Chile's cities, although the influx of thousands of rural people to the cities in search of work, social problems were increasing. The 13 Generation established itself in 1913 after participating in the "Salones de El Mercurio". These new Chilean painters – The 13 Generation – had emerged from the lower classes. Disciples of Pedro Lira, they formed a painting academy at the Catholic University of Chile while studying at the Academy of Fine Arts.

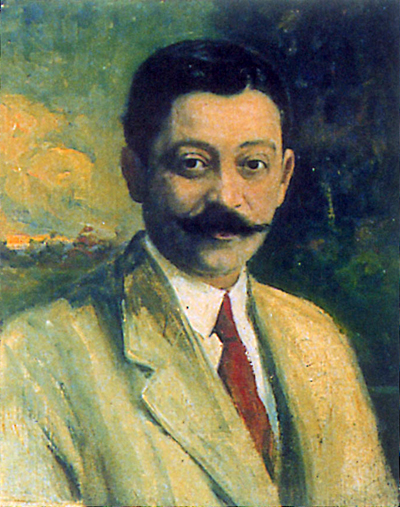
Fernando Álvarez de Sotomayor trained many members of The 13 Generation at the Academy of Fine Arts

Many members of The 13 Generation studied at the Academia de Pintura, under Fernando Álvarez de Sotomayor, a notable Spanish painter who took charge of the Academia during the period of 1910–1915, after the departure of Virginio Arias. According to the art critic Luis Álvarez Urquieta, "the efforts of Alvarez de Sotomayor at our school could not have been more fruitful; he reformed its rules, almost doubled the number of registered students, and trained many who were a hope for the future of our art". Though they were poor, The 13 Generation was incentivized and educated to put their personality into their work and paint about poverty and the lower classes, considered taboo topics at the time. They also portrayed the lives of farmers, workers and popular traditions. The 13 Generation did not achieve a permanent change in the parameters of art in Chile; this came later, with the Grupo Montparnasse, and the "Generación del 28" (28 Generation).

== Style ==
The works of The 13 Generation were in the Post-romanticism style. Their landscapes and portraits were created independently of international trends. They painted themes devoted to the social landscape, the life of poverty and common people. Moving away from traditional themes, they maintained certain concepts, such as respect for an accurate representation of volume and colour, and technical expertise in painting the human form. They also explored melancholy as a theme with rich dark colours, broad brush strokes, and less detailed forms which were sketched masterfully. They became dedicated to portraiture, paying less attention to religion and abandoning mythological themes. Their use of red became their signature, combined with deep greens and earthy colours. The use of light was important to this group, showing some details that were reminiscent of the Spanish style inherited from their teacher. Their use of colours moved them closer to a Realist style. Even though the group shared many common characteristics, many of its student members had a very strong signature style. This was the case for both Arturo Gordon and Pedro Luna, whose styles were drastically different even though they were also two of the most notable members of the 13 Generation.

== Legacy ==
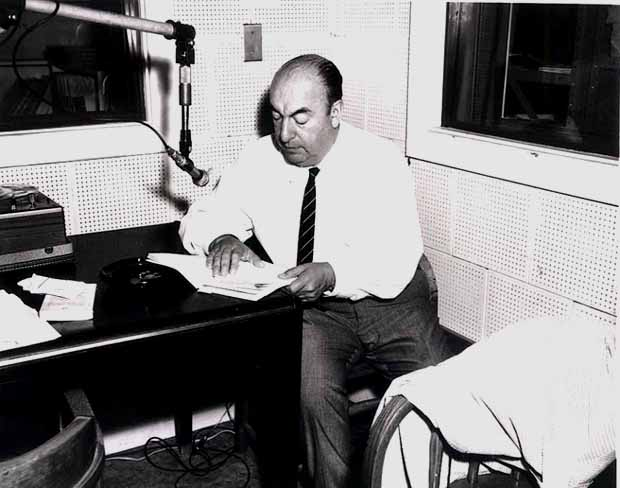
The Chilean poet Pablo Neruda wrote about The 13 Generation and called them the "Heroica capitanía de pintores" (heroic captaincy of painters or heroic vanguard of painters).

The 13 Generation was the first Chilean artistic group to reach a uniformity of style. Its members – bohemians and admirers of Spanish masters – modified the academic conventions with opaque bitumens and contrasting colours. Although their influence was small among Chilean aristocracy, their work has remained a representation of one of the hardest times for the working class, the poor, farmers and the Mapuche people. Almost all of its members died young and it would be their contemporaries, the Grupo Montparnasse, who would eventually overtake the School of Fine Arts to set a new standard of painting in Chile. Since 1945, the painting of The 13 Generation has been recognized in originality and merit. There have been several studies of their works and their sensibilities, especially those of the most popular members of the group, Arturo Gordon and Pedro Luna, whose works are highly valued in the Chilean art market. The 13 Generation began the art trend of Arte campesino, while under the influence of the Spanish style taught by Alvarez de Sotomayor. One of their most notable achievements was to demonstrate that it was possible for impoverished artists with little training to produce high quality paintings.

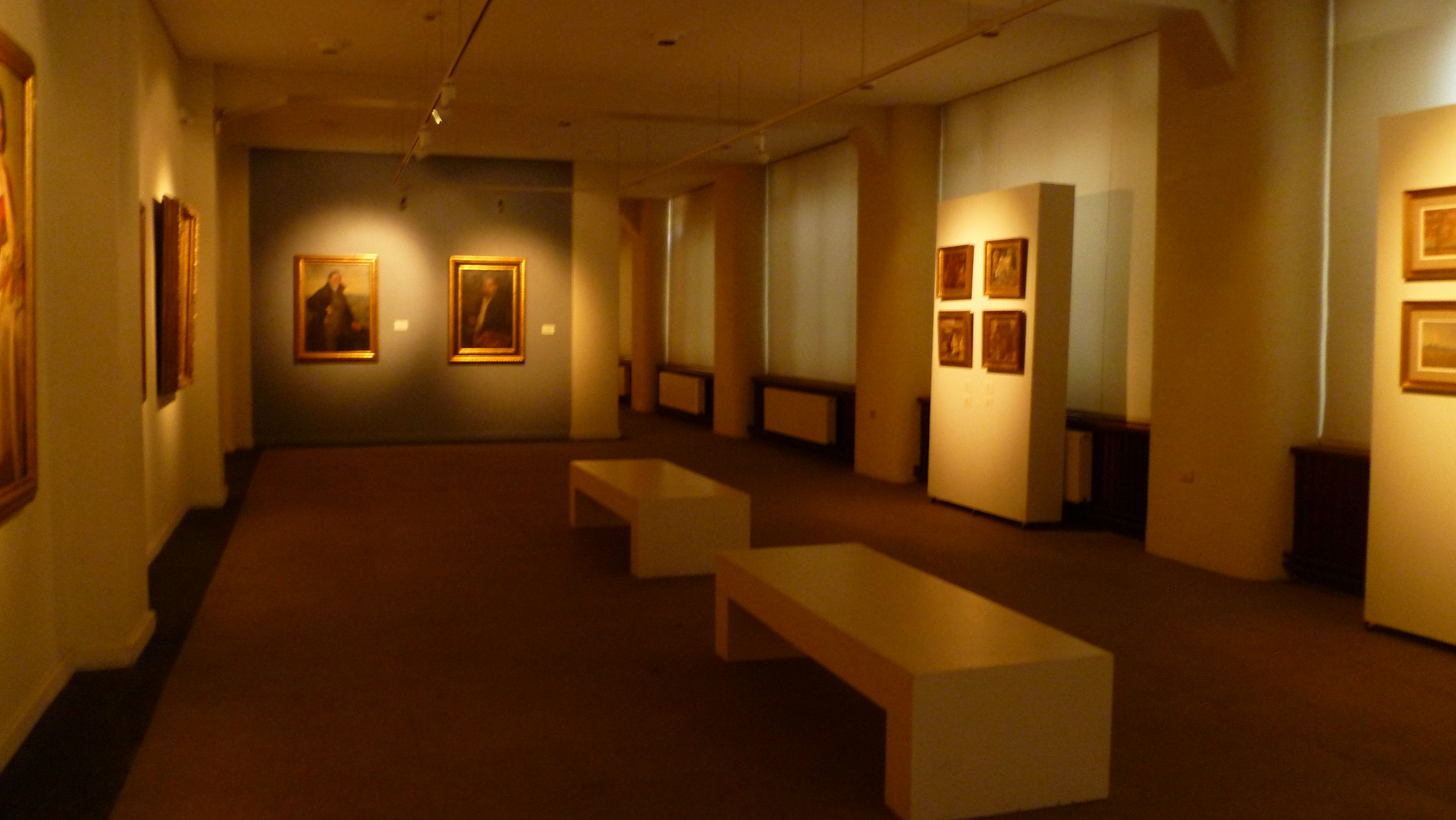
Generación del 13 Hall at the Casa del Arte in Concepción.

Various nicknames are associated with The 13 Generation. "Generación del Centenario" ("Centenary Generation") or "El grupo del Centenario" corresponds with the Chilean Centennial, although only one member of the collective, Ezequiel Plaza, was entered into the inaugural exhibition of the Museum of Fine Arts on September 21, 1910. Álvarez de Sotomayor's influence was so important upon the group that in the Ministry of Education's retrospective of The 13 Generation, it referred to the group as "Generation Alvarez de Sotomayor". "Generación trágica" ("Tragic Generation") was inspired by of the early deaths of some of its members.

Several museums hold collections of The 13 Generation, such as Casa del Arte, Concepción; Chilean National Museum of Fine Arts (Museo Nacional de Bellas Artes or MNBA), Santiago de Chile; and Museo Histórico O'Higginiano, Talca. One of the largest collections is held by the University of Chile after its 1958 acquisition of the pieces held by Julio Vásquez Cortez.

== Members ==
Various authors have identified the following as the most representative members of The 13 Generation. At least one author has mentioned that the group was made up of approximately twenty artists, including students from the University of Chile.

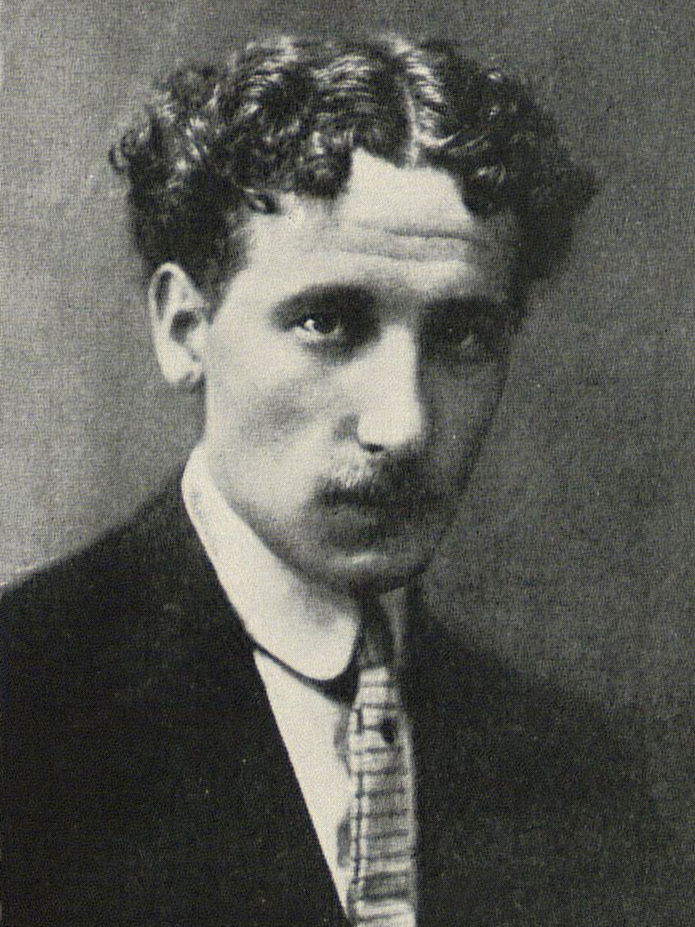
Otto Georgi

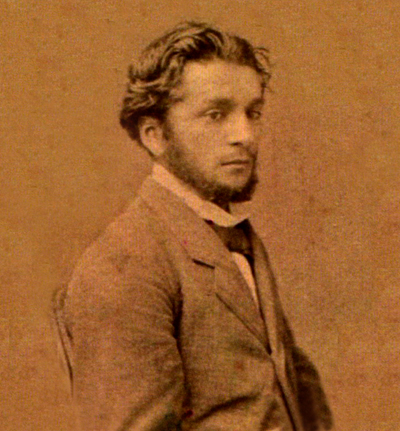
Juan Francisco Gonalez

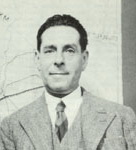
Arturo Gordon

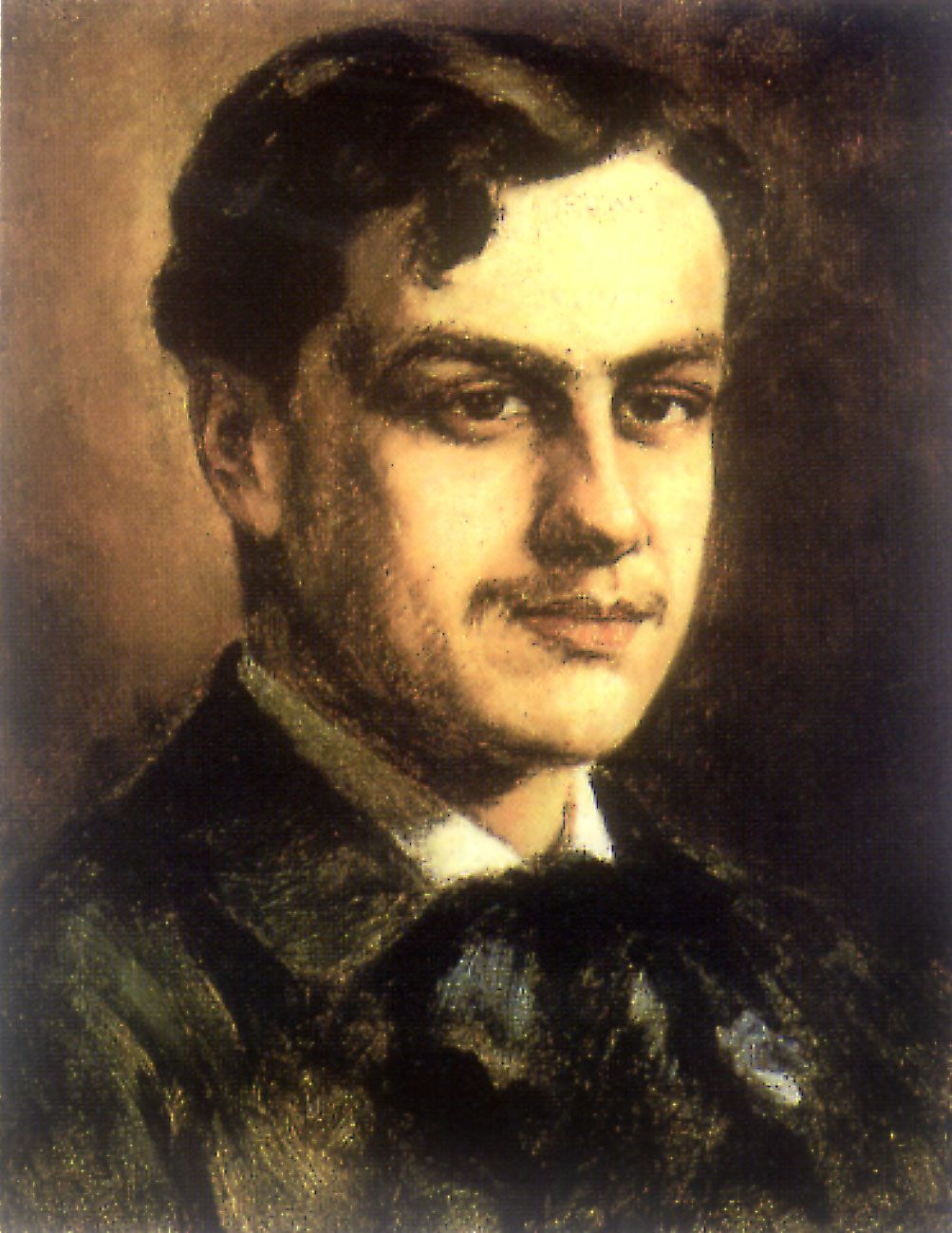
Augusto d'Halmar

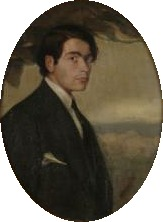
Alberto Lobos

- Agustín Abarca (1882–1953): Born in Talca, Abarca was the second to win the National Art Prize of Chile and studied with Pedro Lira and Paul Burchard. One of the few painters of this generation to live to an old age. His paintings of Chilean native forests are among his most remarkable.
- Francisco Alcalde (1885–1946): Known for painting Autumn Landscape, which currently hangs in the Museum of Fine Arts.
- Judith Alpi (1893–1938): Served as an art professor at the Liceo Javiera Carrera and received several awards throughout her life.
- Gilberto Avendaño (1891–1964): With Abelardo Bustamante, vehemently defended their artistic styles. In the bohemian world became famous as "El loro Gilbert" (Gilbert the Parrot) for his eloquence. He developed as a draftsman and portraitist.
- Enrique Bertrix (1895–1915): The son of French immigrants, he was the youngest of the students of Academy director Álvarez de Sotomayor. In 1914, he travelled to France to fight in World War I, where he died. Despite his short life, he received important awards from the Salon Oficial de Chile.
- Albelardo Bustamante (1888–1934): Known as "Pashin" Bustamante. As well as painting, he also ventured into wood carving, cabinet-making, and engraving. Traveled to Europe with a scholarship, but, after his return to Chile, died in poverty.
- Jerónimo Costa (1880–1967): Born in Italy, arrived in Chile at the age of four. Shared the style of The 13 Generation but worked at a distance from the group, taking classes with Arturo Gordon and Pedro Lira.
- Manuel Gallinato: Worked as a teacher at the Liceo de Los Andes; painted landscapes and historic houses.
- Otto Georgi (1890–1969): Married fellow painter Elmina Moisan in 1926. Excelled in drawing, watercolour and pastel, specialized in ceramic and mosaic techniques.
- Ricardo Gilbert: Tenacious defender of his group. Among his most noteworthy works was a portrait of the painter Juan Francisco González.
- Arturo Gordon (1883–1944): One of the best known members of the group. Particularly noteworthy paintings include Funeral de un angelito (Funeral of a Little Angel) and La Zamacueca. Early in his career he studied architecture before moving on to painting. He was a pupil of Pedro Lira and Cosme San Martín, while Álvarez de Sotomayor praised his talent and compared him to the Spaniard Francisco Goya. Gordon preferred to paint rural issues and common people, for which he received several awards throughout his life. He also served as professor of painting at Viña del Mar.
- Carlos Isamitt (1887–1974): Prominent Chilean musician, and won a National Art Prize in 1965. Was professor and director of the School of Fine Arts.
- Humberto Izquierdo: Worked as a portraitist among high society. Based in Argentina; details of his life and death remain unknown.
- The Lobos brothers: A group of three brothers from modest origins who exerted great influence on their peers and are remembered as lovers of Spanish tradition, inherited from their teacher.
  - Enrique Lobos (1887–1918): The eldest brother, influenced by his partner Enrique Beatrix, and considered by some the most representative artist of The 13 Generation.
  - Alfredo Lobos (1890–1927): The middle brother, he travelled to Spain for a major exhibition; died before finding success in Chile.
  - Alberto Lobos (1892–1925): Born in Rancagua and was the youngest of the brothers. Believed to have died at the age of 33 (though there is some disagreement on the date of his death).
- Pedro Luna (1892–1956): One of the most studied painters of this generation, Pedro Luna became a portraitist of Mapuche traditions and daily life and was one of the most prolific artists of the generation. He worked mainly in portraiture, but also had remarkable achievements as a landscapist, with Antonio Romera says that "the force of his temperament can be seen in his paintings."
- Andrés Madariaga (1879–1920): Less involved in the group than many others of the generation; painted rural and urban landscapes and also ventured into portrait.
- Fernando Meza (1890–1929): Famous for his painting of the city of Valparaíso in autumn. Died in Concepción.
- Elmina Moisan (1897–1938): Won major awards throughout his life, such as the gold medal at the Ibero-American Exhibition in Seville in 1929. Died of malaria in Peru.
- Enrique Moya (1892–1918): Little is known of his life and death, which are also difficult to date. Worked as a portraitist with a style that recalled the Spaniard Francisco Goya. Became one of the most outstanding students of Fernando Álvarez de Sotomayor.
- Ezequiel Plaza (1892–1947): From humble beginnings, his style evolved from an academic realism into a kind of "idealism", according to Antonio Romera. Left numerous remarkable pictures such as Pintor Bohemio (Bohemian Painter). His paintings are considered by many as a symbol of the "Tragic Generation" (another name for The 13 Generation).
- José Pridas y Solares (1889 -?): Born in Spain in 1910; was a classmate of Álvarez de Sotomayor and participated in the exhibition held by the newspaper El Mercurio in 1913. The date of his death is unknown.
- Jaime Torrent (1893–1925): Born in Linares, his style showed his teacher's influence in its detailed anatomical features. Died of tuberculosis. Portrayed the painter Julio Vásquez Cortez and is considered the patron of the group.
- Ulises Vásquez (1892–1942). Landscapist, studied with Lira and Valenzuela Llanos. Was mentioned in a poem by Neruda that referred to the group as “The Heroic Captaincy of Painters”. His career was affected by his lack of funds and he continued to take on humble jobs to support his family.

Lesser known members

- Carlos Ludstedt
- Óscar Millán
- Estela Ross Mujica
- Guillermo Vergara

== Partial works ==
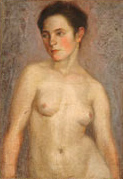
Desnudo (nude), by Abelardo “Pashin” Bustamante

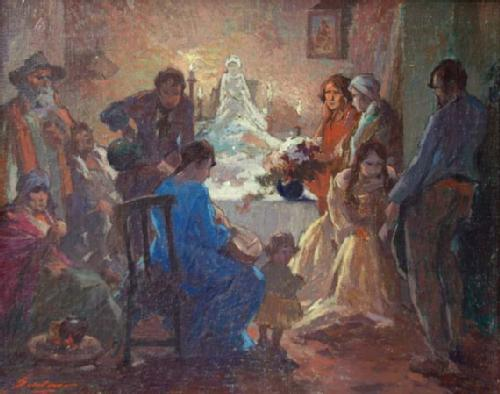
Velorio de un angelito (Funeral of a Little Angel) by Arturo Gordon

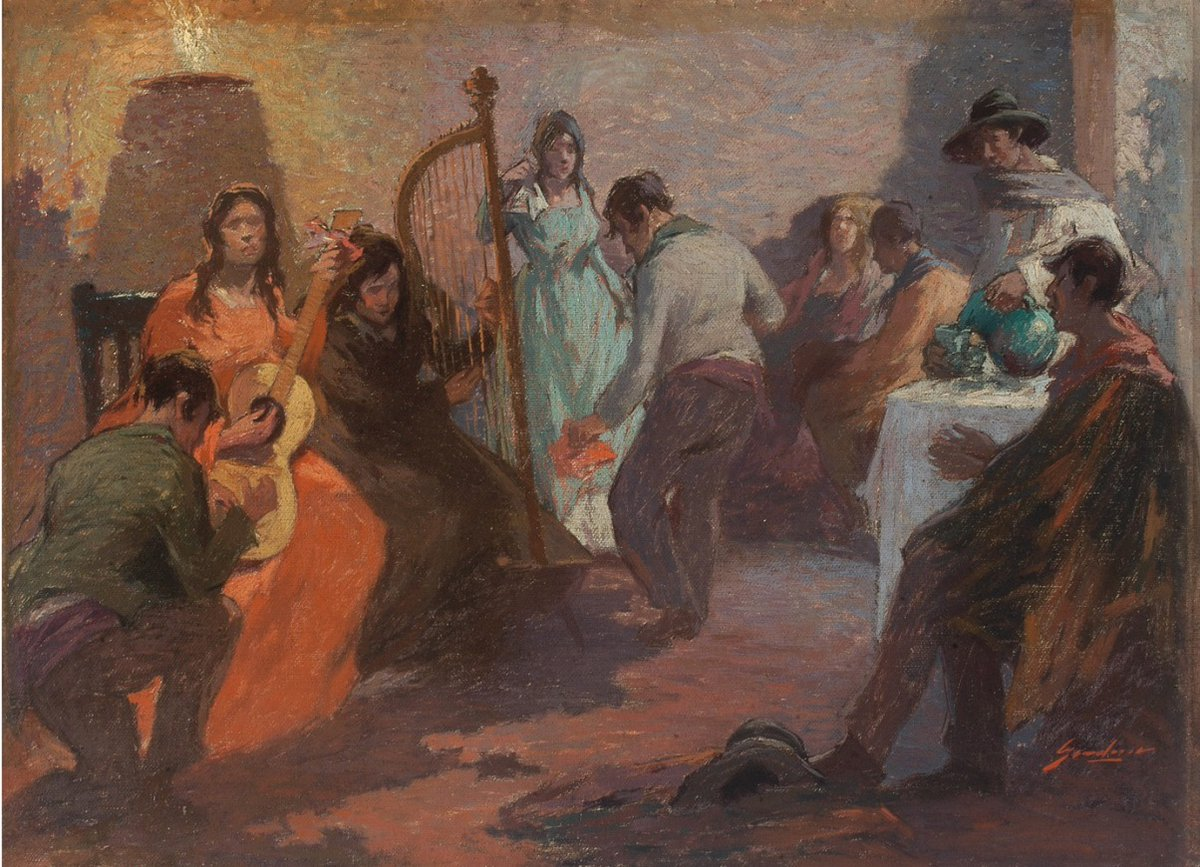
Zamacueca, by Arturo Gordon

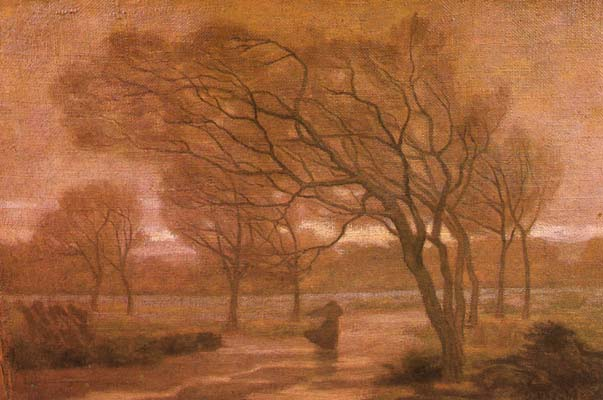
Viento puelche (Puelche wind), by Ulises Vásquez

== See also ==
- Atenea
