= Alexander Sutulov =

Alexander Sutulov Popov (1925, Yugoslavia/Croatia – 1991) was a Yugoslavia-born Russian and Chilean chemical engineer specialized in electrometallurgy and extractive metallurgy and active in El Teniente copper mine and various research institutions. In the University of Concepción he contributed to the establishment of the metallurgical engineering degree in 1961. He fought in the Red Army in the Second World War and graduated from the University of Belgrade in 1950. He was forced to leave Yugoslavia when a decree was issued expelling all non-Communist Russian citizens from the country. In 1955 he arrived on a contract by Braden Copper Company to the Andean mining town of Sewell in Chile. There he worked as chief of metallurgical research of El Teniente. In 1961 he was invited to work in the University of Concepción by its rector David Stitchkin. From 1970 to 1973 he worked in the University of Utah and from 1974 onward, and back in Chile, in Codelco. For his contributions to field of metallurgy he was granted the Medalla al Mérito del Instituto de Ingenieros de Chile.

By the initiative of the Chilean Ministry of Mining the Chilean Institute of Mining Engineers (Instituto de Ingenieros de Mina de Chile) grants since 1997 a prize named after him. Sutulov have also been homaged in the mural La Historia de la Minería Chilena in the University of Concepción.

He was a member of the American Institute of Mining, Metallurgical, and Petroleum Engineers.

== Selected works ==
- Sutulov, Alexander (1975). "Antecedentes históricos de la producción de cobre en Chile". In Sutulov, Alexander (ed.). El Cobre Chileno (in Spanish). Corporación Nacional del Cobre de Chile. pp. 3–61.
