= Enrique Molina Garmendia =

Chilean educator and philosopher

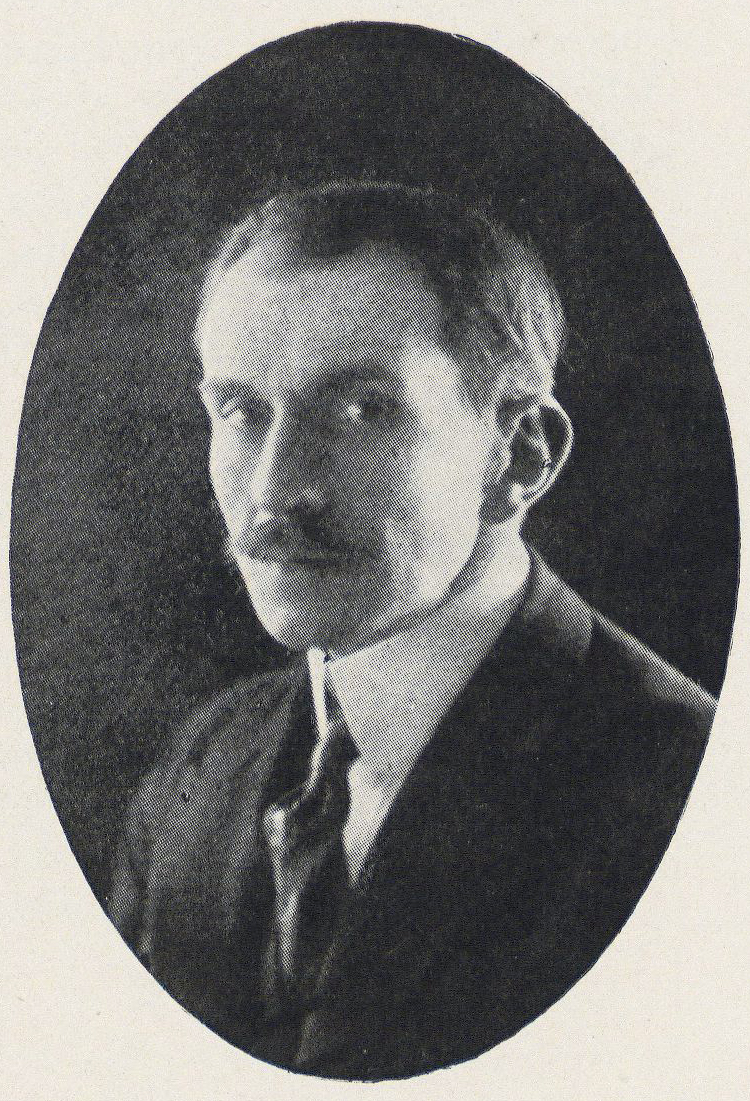
Enrique Molina Garmendia

Enrique Molina Garmendia (August 4, 1871, La Serena, Chile – March 8, 1964, Concepción, Chile) was a Chilean educator and philosopher who promoted and aided in the development of the decentralization of education in Chile. His greatest achievement was founding the Universidad de Concepción (University of Concepción), the third oldest university in Chile and the first to be located outside the capital Santiago. Garmendia is considered the most distinguished pedagogue of his time, as well as one of the most influential Chilean philosophers.

He received various distinctions during his lifetime, among them the honor of Doctor Honoris Causa from the University of Chile and that of Rector Honorario Vitalicio (Honorary University President for Life) from the University of Concepción.

== Publications ==
Some of his main works, including books, scientific, and philosophical articles:

- 1907 – The Task of the Professor and Education
- 1909 – The Social Philosophy of Lester Ward
- 1909 – Science and Traditionalism
- 1909 – The Pragmatism of William James
- 1912 – Culture and General Education
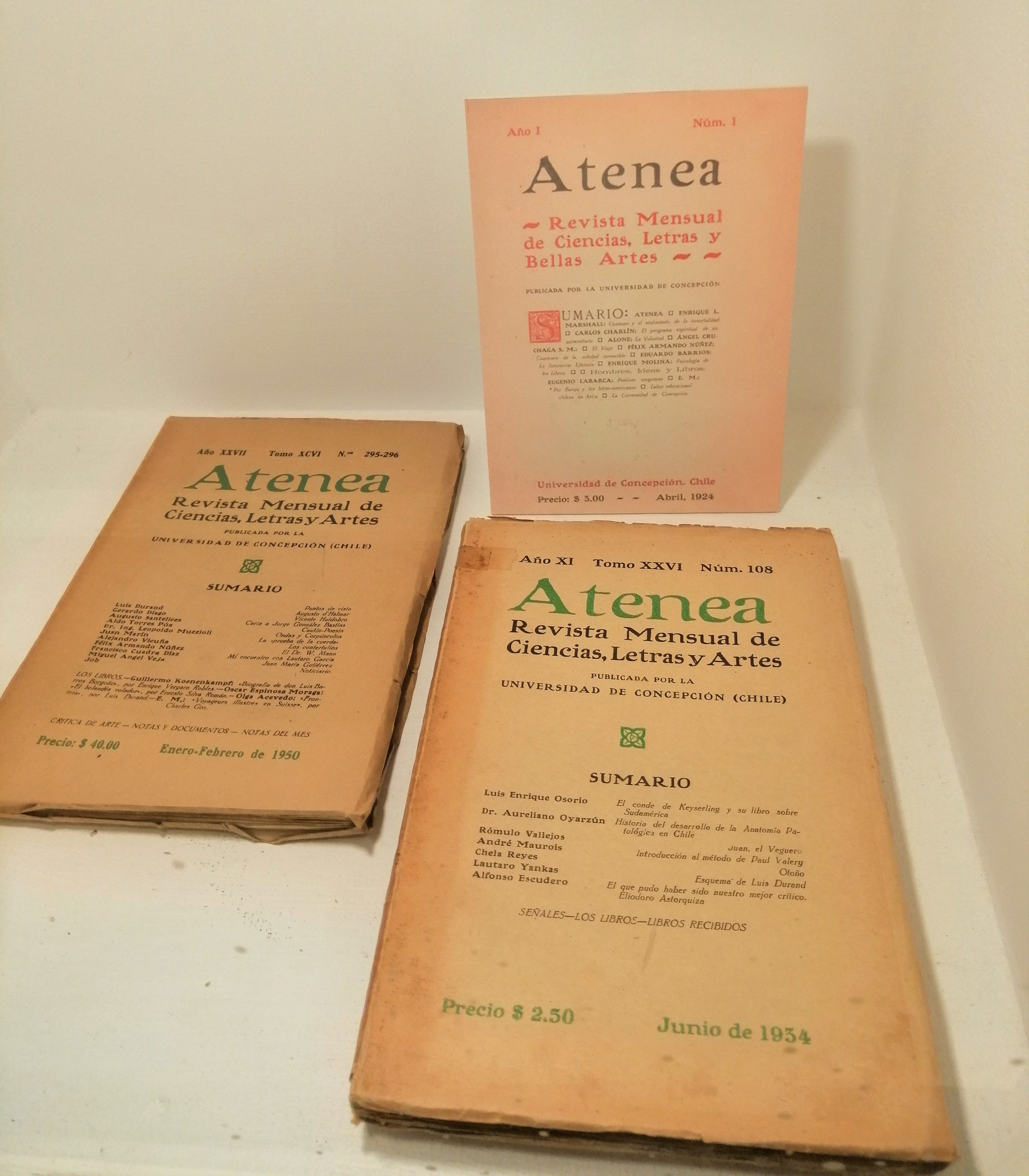
- First editions (1924), 108 (1934) and 295–296 (1950) of the Journal, Atenea, founded by Enrique Molina, exhibited at the Gallery of History at Conceptión.
  1913 – American Philosophy (Collection of Essays)
- 1914 – Contemporary Education
- 1917 – American Democracies and What They Have to Do
- 1920 – On the Two Americas
- 1921 – From California to Harvard (Studies about the North American University and Some Problems of Ours)
- 1935 – The Russian and Bolchevista Revoluction
- 1940 – Projects of the Intuition
- 1941 – Pilgrimage of the University
- 1942 – A Philospical Confesion and a Call for Improving Hispanic America
- 1943 – Memories of Don Valentín Letelier
- 1944 – The Philosophy of Bergson
- 1944 – Nietzche, Dionysianism, and Asceticism. His Life and Ideology
- 1947 – On Spirituality in Human Life
- 1952 – Tragedy and Realization of the Spirit

== Distinctions ==
The work Tribute to the Spirit of the Founders of the University of Concepción, designed by Samuel Román, honors Enrique Molina as the co-founder and first rector of the University of Concepción.

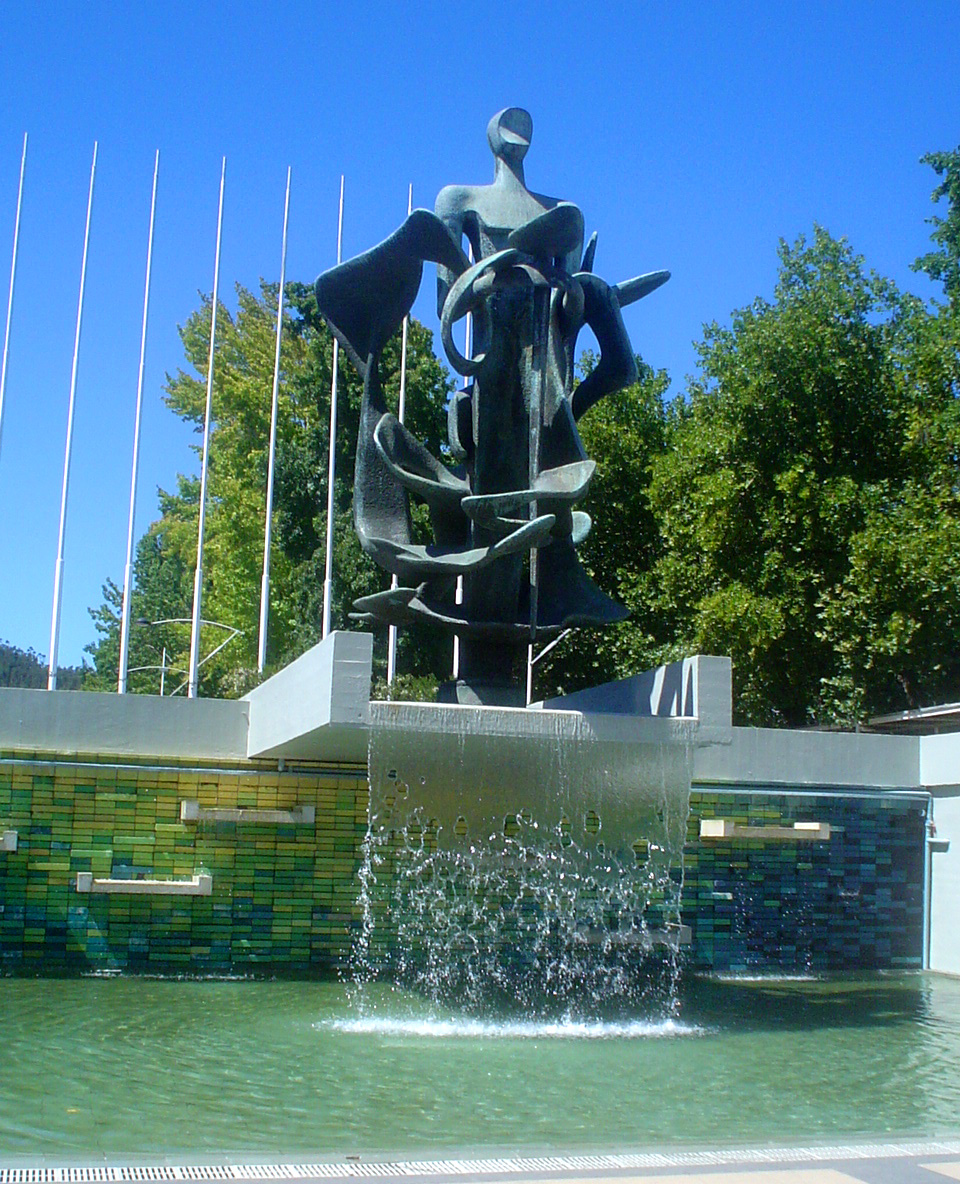
The work Tribute to the Spirit of the Founders of the University of Concepción, designed by Samuel Román, honors Enrique Molina as the co-founder and first rector of the University of Concepción.

In his various trips through other countries Molina Garmendia received multiple distinction and awards including:

- Goethe Medal, Germany
- Academic member of the Faculty of Philosophy at the University of Chile, Santiago
- Official of the Academy of Ministry of Public Instruction, France
- Knight of the Crown, Italy
- Member of the athenaeum, Mexico
- Award of Art from the Municipality of Concepción, 1953, Concepción, Chile

Additionally in 1956 he was named the rector of the University of Conceptión for life; in 1959 the author Samuel Román erected in his name the monument Tribute to the Spirit of the Founders of the University of Concepción, placed at the City University of Conceptión. The same year he received the honorary title, Doctor Honoris Causa at the University of Chile.
