= Plaza Perú (Concepción) =

Town square in Concepción, Chile

Coordinates: 36.8268°S 73.0400°W

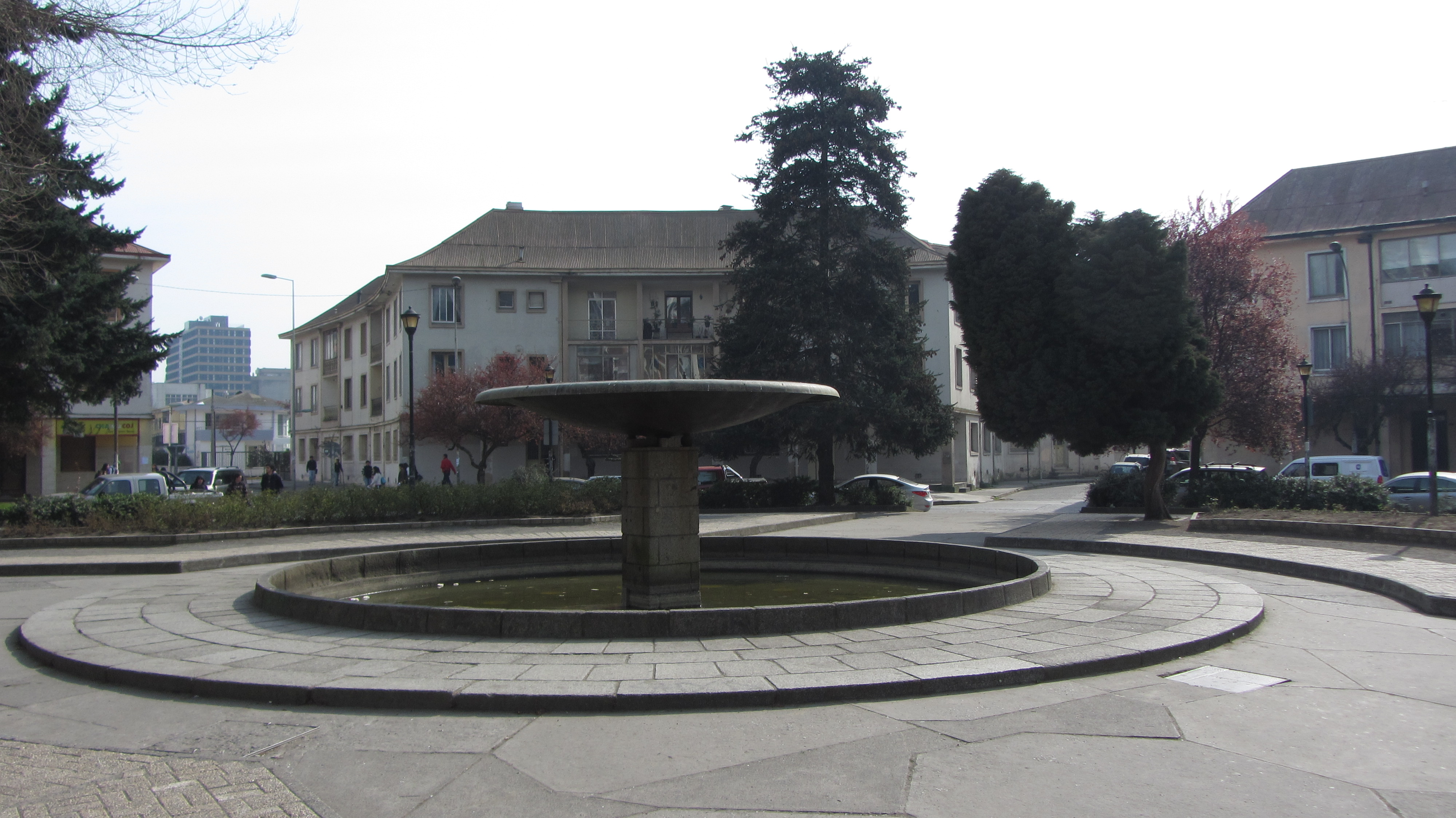
Plaza Peru

Plaza Perú is a square in the city of Concepción, Chile. It is situated in the University District in front of the main entrance of the Ciudad Universitaria de Concepción, by the Arco Universidad de Concepción and adjacent to the Casa del Arte. Built in 1942, there are several historic buildings surrounding the square, which were built in the 1940s. The plaza is known for being a gathering of students at the University of Concepción and youth in general.

== Geography ==
The square is situated in the University District in front of the main entrance of the Ciudad Universitaria de Concepción. Nearby is the Arco Universidad de Concepción while the Casa del Arte museum is on the corner. It is connected to the city center by Avenida Diagonal Pedro Aguirre Cerda, which intersects into the Plaza René Schneider. The Avenida Diagonal Pedro Aguirre Cerda was proposed following the earthquake of 1939, linking two points of urban relevance, the square of the Courts of Justice and the Plaza Peru, thus connecting the University District and downtown. In front of the square there is a boulevard with awnings that allow shade and protection from rain, as well as several restaurants. Various exhibitions are held at the Plaza Peru, as well as antique fairs and book fairs.

== History ==
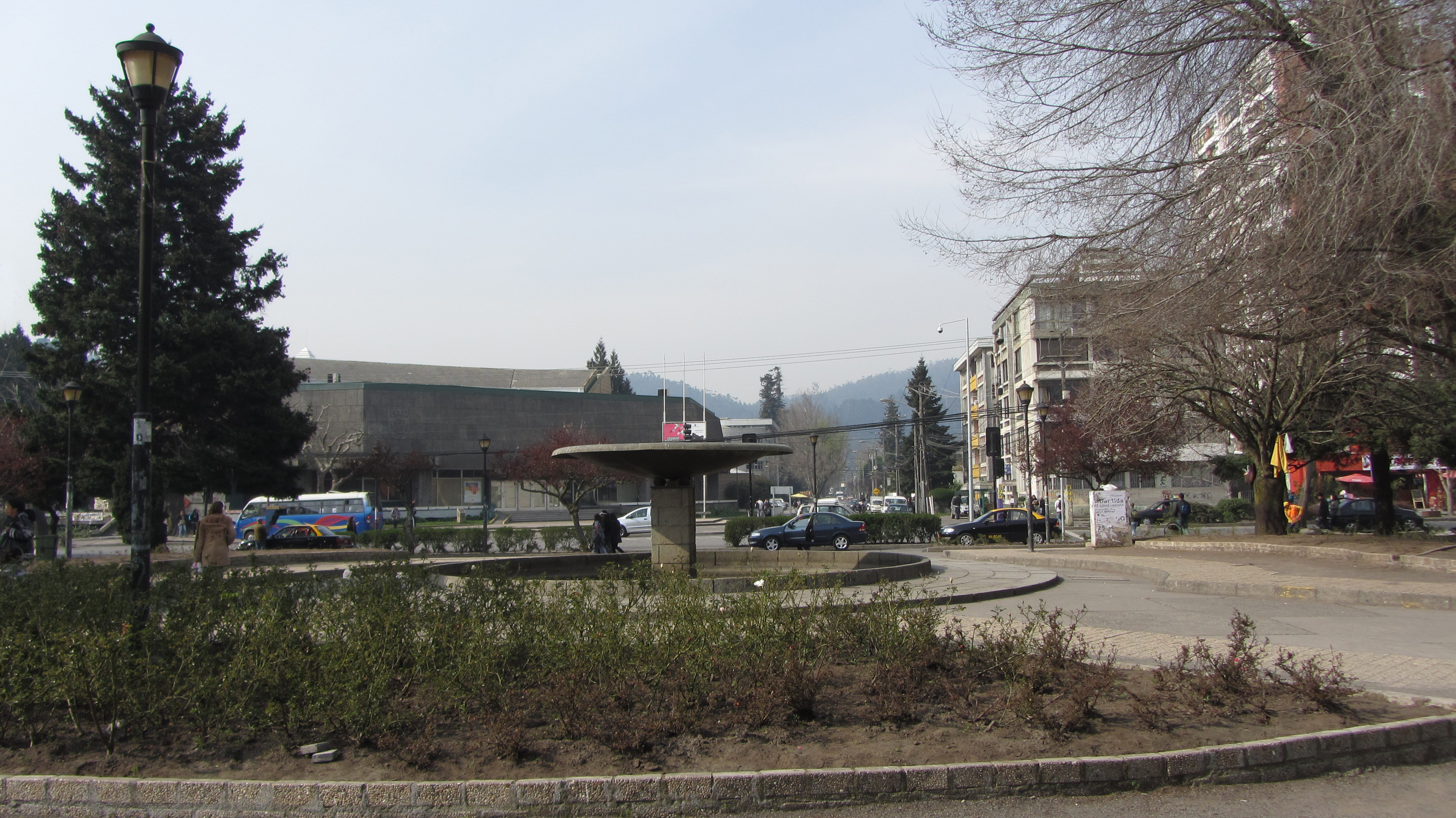
Plaza Peru with Casa del Arte in the distance.

The square, semicircle in design with over-sized walls, was built in 1942 by architects Ovalle and Sarabia, in parallel with the Avenida Diagonal Pedro Aguirre Cerda. The design was selected from an open architectural competition in 1941 by the "Cash for reconstruction and relief" after the 1939 Chillán earthquake. The work was funded by the Pacific Steel Company (CAP) and was completed in the mid-1950s. As a civic hub, it connects the main campus of the University of Concepción with the city center. Originally, it served as the meeting place of European immigrant families who arrived in Concepción. Its surrounding buildings, neoclassical in style, are of the late 1940s era, with interior terraces and balconies influenced by Parisian around of the square. There were also homes of foreign engineers and technicians who emigrated to Concepción to work on CAP and later in Siderúrgica Huachipato. Still later, several of these houses were inhabited by Chilean residents. In 1950, a round fountain was installed in the center of the square.

During the 1990s, the green areas were deteriorating and were not kept by the municipality. Gradually, pubs and restaurants settled in around the square. In the present day, the Plaza Peru is a youth meeting point with an abundant supply of entertainment venues. Local residents are unhappy with the deterioration they've witnessed at the plaza. There is no landscaping, the sidewalks are in poor condition, and premises sell alcohol late into the night. People drink, use drugs, and sell them at the plaza, which is a city landmark.
