= Laura Rodig =

Chilean sculptor and painter (1901–1972)

- Born: September 7, 1896; Los Andes, Chile
- Died: October 30, 1972 (aged 76); Santiago, Chile
- Education: University of Chile
- Style: Painting, Sculpture, Illustration
- Mother: Tránsito Pizarro

Laura Rodig (née, Laura del Tránsito Pizarro; September 7, 1896 - October 30, 1972) was a Chilean painter, sculptor, illustrator and educator. She was one of the leaders of the Pro-Emancipation Movement of Chilean Women (MEMCH).

== Biography ==
She was born in Los Andes, Chile on September 7, 1896, to Tránsito Pizarro and an unnamed father, according to the Civil Register of Births in that city. Over time she subtracted various years from her birthday before she finally settled on June 7, 1901, which was the same year as when her mother married Alejandro Rodig, a pharmacist.

At the age of 17 she entered the School of Fine Arts of the University of Chile; she later claimed that she was promoted by the diplomat Pedro Felipe Iñíguez, who discovered her talent. As a student, she stood out for her rebellious spirit against the academic impositions of her teachers, among whom was Virginio Arias. She was expelled from the school for some caricatures she made of him, but thanks to the teacher, Fernando Álvarez de Sotomayor y Zaragoza, who requested her re-entry, she was granted a workshop in a building of the same School.

Rodig was a founder of the Chilean Association of Painters and Sculptors, as well as being one of the first Chilean artists to promote social art and raise awareness about indigenous ancestors. She was also a prominent political activist, she was part of the Communist Party of Chile and one of the leaders of MEMCH. During her stay in Europe, she was also part of the International Red Aid, and in Chile she joined the "Alliance of Intellectuals" who supported the Spanish Republic during the Civil War, in 1938. Parallel to her artistic career, she developed her vocation as an educator, taking and teaching drawing and visual arts classes. She died in Santiago, October 30, 1972.

== Works in public collections ==
- Salitreros (Oil on canvas, ca. 1936, 80 x 90 cm. National Museum of Fine Arts, Santiago de Chile.)
- Tipos mexicanos 1 (Oil on canvas, 80 x 66 cm. National Museum of Fine Arts, Santiago de Chile.)
- Tipos mexicanos 2 (Oil on canvas, 80 x 66 cm. National Museum of Fine Arts, Santiago de Chile.)
- Columnas de sueño (Oil on canvas, 46 x 38 cm. National Museum of Fine Arts, Santiago de Chile.)
- Desnudo de mujer (Oil on canvas, 80 x 67 cm. National Museum of Fine Arts, Santiago de Chile.)
- Maternidad (Sculpture, 1950, Museo Nacional de Bellas Artes, Santiago de Chile.)
- Retrato I (Bronze sculpture, 1949, Museo Nacional de Bellas Artes, Santiago de Chile.)

== Individual expositions ==
- 1924, Galería de Arte, Madrid, Spain.
- 1930, Salón del Trocadero, del Palacio de las Américas, París, France.
- 1963, Figurativa Laura Rodig, Sala de Previsión del Banco de Chile, Santiago, Chile.
