= Campanil of the University of Concepción =

The Campanil of the University of Concepción (Spanish: Campanil de la Universidad de Concepción) is a bell tower located on the central campus of the University of Concepción in Concepción, Chile. Built between 1942 and 1943 and inaugurated in early 1944, the tower is considered one of the most recognizable architectural elements of the university. It forms part of the central campus area, which was declared a Chilean Monumento Histórico in 2016.

== History ==
Plans to build a bell tower arose in the early 1940s during the rectorship of Enrique Molina Garmendia. According to university accounts, Molina was influenced by his visit to several U.S. campuses, particularly the campanile at the University of California, Berkeley.

A design competition produced several proposals, including those by Julio Ríos Boettiger and Alberto Cormaches. The winning project was submitted by architect Enrique San Martín. Construction began in 1942 under the supervision of civil engineer Juan Villa Luco and finished in 1943, with the official opening taking place in 1944.

By the mid-20th century, the tower had become a widely used institutional emblem and was adopted in publications and symbolic representations related to the university.

== Design ==
The Campanil is constructed of reinforced concrete and rises approximately 42-42.5 metres above the campus forum. Its design has been described as a modern reinterpretation of traditional bell towers, reflecting influences from the Berkeley Campanile and early 20th-century Italianate academic architecture.

The structure includes an internal staircase leading to an observation level near the top. Construction materials included reinforced concrete, imported cement, and river sand from the Biobío River. Due to the soil conditions of the area, the foundations were supported by eucalyptus pilings.

The tower serves as a vertical landmark within the campus master plan, reinforcing the axial symmetry of the central forum and forming a notable element in the urban landscape of Concepción.

== Cultural significance ==
The Campanil is one of the most recognizable symbols of the University of Concepción and a notable feature of the city’s visual identity. It is frequently included in cultural events, tourism materials, and institutional iconography.

During Chile’s annual Día del Patrimonio Cultural, guided visits to the Campanil are among the most attended activities on the campus, which attracts several thousand participants each year.

Historic documents and archival material highlight the tower’s longstanding cultural significance within the Biobío Region.

== See also ==
- Sather Tower
