= Isabel Le Brun de Pinochet =

Chilean teacher and activist (1845–1930)

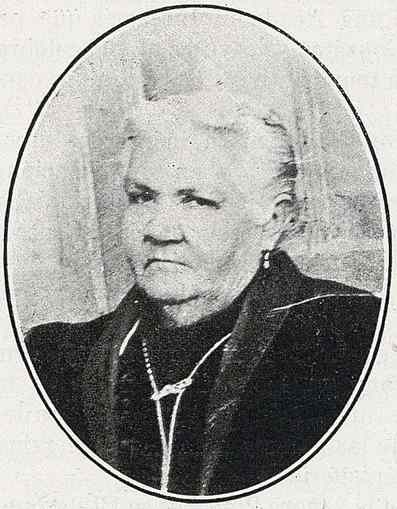
- Le Brun in 1895
- Born: Isabel Le Brun Reyes; 1845; San Felipe, Chile
- Died: 1930 (aged 84–85); Santiago, Chile
- Spouse: Marcos Fidel Pinochet Espinoza (m. 1862)
- Children: 16, including Tancredo Pinochet

Isabel Le Brun de Pinochet (née Le Brun Reyes; 1845–1930) was a Chilean teacher, high school director and activist for secondary education for women. Le Brun's activism played arole in the passing of the Amunátegui Decree, which allowed women to enter university and mandated the construction of public secondary schools.

== Biography ==
Le Brun was born in 1845 in San Felipe to Estanislao Le Brun, a French immigrant and former member of the Grande Armée, and Francisca Reyes, a teacher. Le Brun received her primary education from her mother, and began teaching local children in her community at age 14. In 1875, Le Brun established the Recoleta School (Spanish: Colegio de la Recoleta), later known as the Liceo Isabel Le Brun de Pinochet, a private primary and secondary school for women. Championing the secularization of women's education, Le Brun's school followed educational reform by instating the Concentric System.

On 1 December 1876, Le Brun send a request to the University Council asking for the nomination of university commissions to assist and validate her students' exams. Following the Council's inaction, Le Brun wrote articles and petitioned the University of Chile itself to allow its female students to take exams. On 6 February 1877, the Minister of Education Miguel Luis Amunátegui signed the Amunátegui Decree which allowed women for the first time to enter university and mandated the construction of public secondary schools. Following the decree Le Brun's daughter, Noemi Pinochet Le Brun, enrolled at the University of Chile and later earned her bachelor's degree.

The Liceo Isabel Le Brun de Pinochet closed in 1930, the same year as her death in Santiago.

== Personal life ==
On 10 June 1862, Le Brun married the mining entrepreneur Marcos Fidel Pinochet Espinoza. Le Brun and Pinochet had 16 children, including Tancredo Pinochet..

== Legacy ==
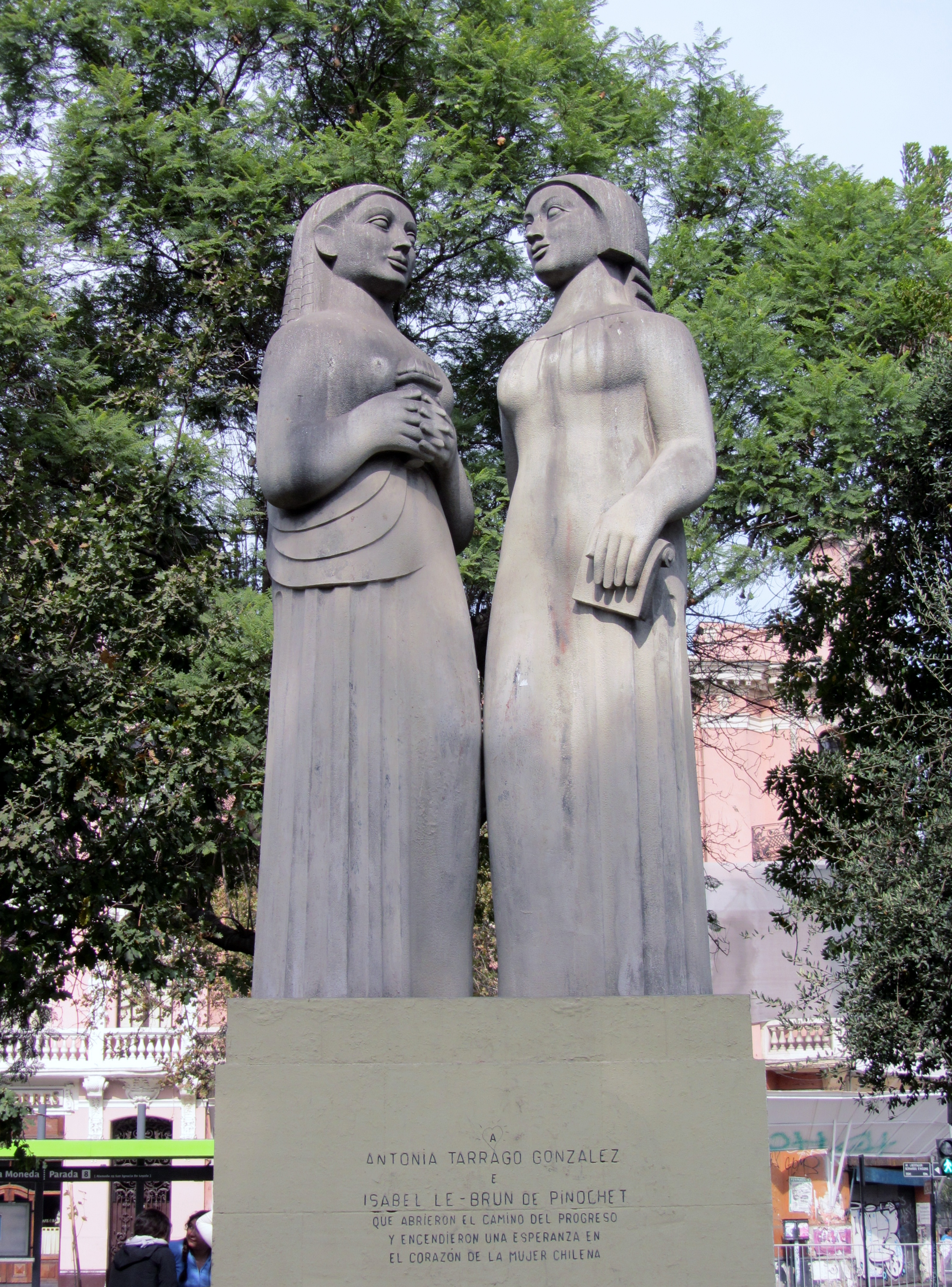
Samuel Román Rojas (1946) Monument to the educators Antonia Tarragó and Isabel Le Brun de Pinochet.

In 1946, Samuel Román Rojas created the sculpture Monument to the educators Antonia Tarragó and Isabel Le Brun de Pinochet (Spanish: Monumento a las educadoras Antonia Tarragó e Isabel Le Brun de Pinochet) which stands at the central median of the Alameda in Santiago.
