= David Stitchkin =

Chilean attorney (1912–1997)

David Stitchkin Branover
- Born: October 25, 1912; Santiago, Chile
- Died: July 12, 1997 (aged 84)
- Education: University of Chile
- Occupations: Lawyer rector
- Spouse: Fanny Litvak
- Children: 4

David Stitchkin Branover (October 25, 1912 — July 12, 1997) was a Chilean attorney and rector of the University of Concepción from 1956 to 1962.

== Early life and education ==
He was born in Santiago, Chile, on October 25, 1912. He attended the Law School of the University of Chile. His parents were Russian Jews from Kishinev who escaped the pogroms in the country.

== Career ==
At age 27, Branover became a professor at the Law School of the University of Chile.

In 1956 he was named rector of the University of Concepción in Concepción, Chile.

He is remembered for his role in founding the university's Casa del Arte museum during his tenure as Rector.

Stitchkin also contributed to establish the metallurgical engineering degree in 1961 by inviting Alexander Sutulov to work in the university.

== Personal life ==
Branover married Fanny Litvak and the couple had four children, Sergio, Eliana, Lilian and Claudio.

Branover died on July 12, 1997.
