= Agustín Abarca =

Chilean painter

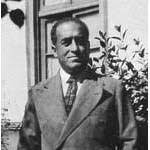
- Portrait of Agustín Abarca
- Born: December 27, 1882; Talca
- Died: May 28, 1953 (aged 70); Santiago
- Known for: Painting

Agustín Abarca (27 December 1882, Talca – 28 May 1953, Santiago) was a Chilean painter. He was a member of the Generación del 13. Abarca went to the Liceo de Hombres and the Instituto Comercial in Talca before being introduced to painting by Pablo Burchard. From 1904 to 1907 he studied at the Universidad Católica under Pedro Lira and Alberto Valenzuela Llanos.
