= Tancredo Pinochet =

Chilean writer and politician

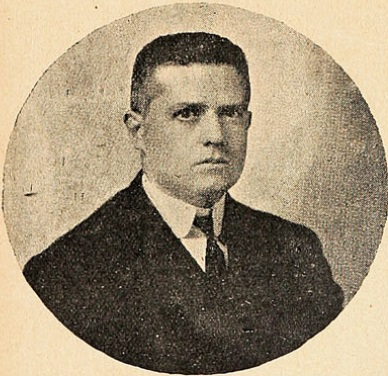
Tancredo Pinochet

Tancredo Pinochet LeBrun (17 March 1880 – 1957) was a Chilean writer and politician.

== Biography ==
Son of a remarkable family of teachers, his father was Marcos Fidel Pinochet Espinosa, and his mother, Isabel Le Brun de Pinochet, was a remarkable educator, and founder of the Institute Pinochet Le Brun. From his childhood he had a vocation for journalism, and, as a child, created his own journals and sent his collaborations (under the pseudonym "Albert Brum") to the local newspaper, "The Authority," of Talca. Later, while living in Europe for ten years, Pinochet wrote "Journey of Effort" and "Journey of a commoner for Europe," narrating his experiences in the continent. On his return to Santiago, he wrote for major newspapers in the capital, particularly "The Enlightenment" magazine, "Pen and Pencil," and "The Journal," of Cruzat Poblete.

He studied at the Institute of Education, University of Chile, graduating as a professor at the Department of English in 1914. After 1910, he lived in Buenos Aires, and in the next two decades he travelled through Latin America to lecture.

He was the editor of the monthly paper The South American, which was published in New York.

== Politics ==
Founder of the first Chilean nationalist party, called Nationalist Party or National Union, together with Guillermo Subercaseaux, Francisco Antonio Encina, Luis Galdames and Alberto Edwards Vives. This group, despite their meager electoral success, had greatly influenced the future, mainly in implementing state policies on social and economic development in the governments of Carlos Ibañez del Campo. As a journalistic essay, Pinochet published the controversial book "Tenant in the Property of Excellence," where the life for workers was reported to the President of the Republic, it is used as a "tenant" (laborer, bracero) of the property of this. It was critical in his enthusiastic coverage of the quality of Chilean education, as the emphasis was on the importance of compulsory primary education and the incorporation of technical education for national economic development which ended in 1920 with the approval in parliament of the Compulsory Primary Education Act.

== Famous phrase ==
"The school and the factory are the levers we have in our hands, the two formidable levers that have to make the transformation of Chile, who have to give the country its moral wealth and material wealth."
