= El Sur (newspaper) =

- Front page of El Sur's 12 September 2013 edition.
- Type: Daily newspaper
- Format: Broadsheet
- Owner(s): Juan Castellón
- Founded: November 15, 1882
- Political alignment: Conservative editorial opinion
- Headquarters: Barros Arana & Caupolicán street, Downtown Concepción, Biobío Region, Chile
- Website: www.elsur.cl

El Sur is a Chilean newspaper published in Concepción and it circulates in almost all the Biobío Region. El Sur is owned by El Sur S.A., which manages two dailies in Concepción: El Sur and Crónica.

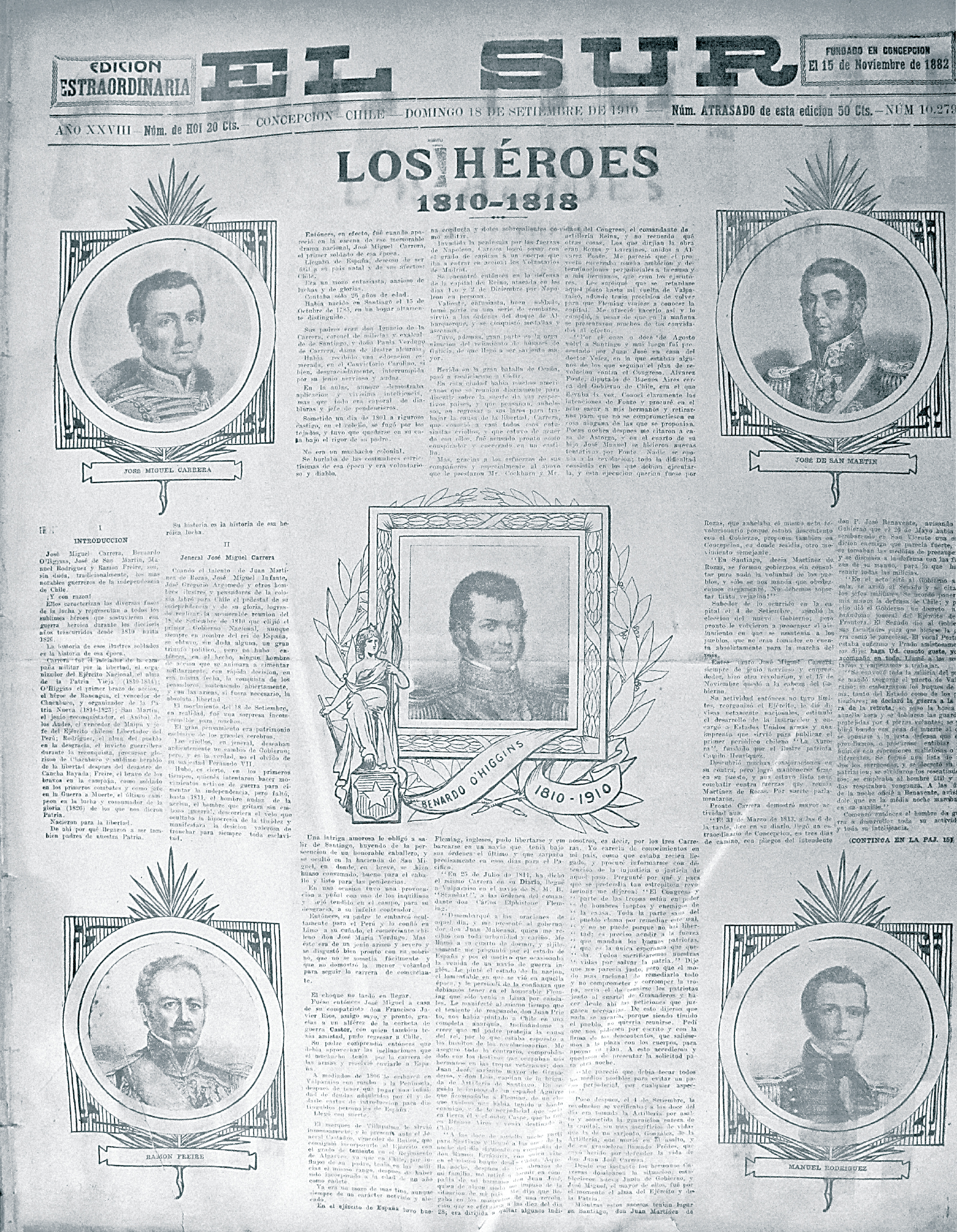
September 18, 1910 issue of El Sur
