= Elmina Moisan =

Chilean painter

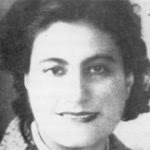
Elmina Moisan

Elmina Moisan (1897-1938) was a Chilean painter remembered in the historiography as part of the Generación del 13. She has been called the "female artist who has painted the best in Chile".

== Biography ==
Elmina Moisan was born in Quillota, 1897. Of French descent, Moisan entered the School of Fine Arts in 1912, being a student of the Spanish painter Fernando Álvarez de Sotomayor y Zaragoza and Ricardo Richon Brunet. After receiving her teaching degree with a major in visual arts, she taught at the Liceo de Chicas N ° 4 in Santiago.

Her works are mainly portraits, scenes of customs, landscapes and still lifes made with a subtle and quite personal style. Her painting, La coqueta (1916), won the first medal in the official salon of Santiago, in 1919.

She married the painter Otto Georgi in 1926, who was also a member of the Generación del 13.

== Death and legacy ==
In 1938, the government of Chile invited Moisan to exhibit and study in Lima, Peru. During her trip, she contracted malaria, a situation that forced her to return to Chile where, after a month of illness, she died in the city of Santiago.

The city of Rancagua, O'Higgins Region, a street bears the name of Elmina Moisan.

== Selected works in public collections ==
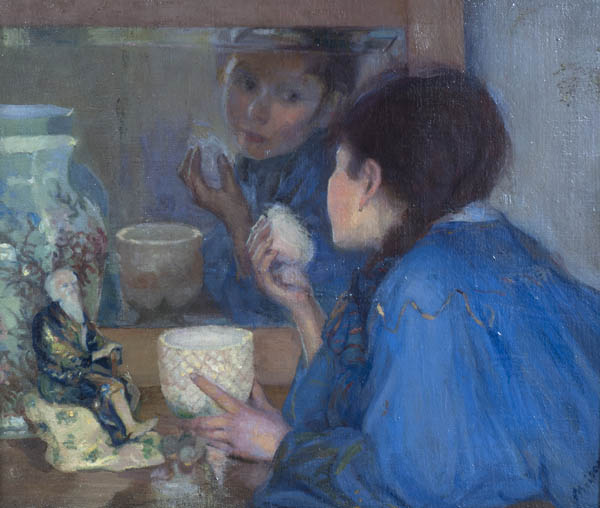
La coqueta, Museo Nacional de Bellas Artes.

- Interior, Óleo sobre tela, 115 x 90 cm. 1926. Museo Nacional de Bellas Artes Santiago de Chile.
- La coqueta, Óleo sobre tela, 53 x 62 cm. Museo Nacional de Bellas Artes Santiago de Chile.
- Cabeza de vieja, Óleo sobre tela, 40 x 36 cm. Museo Nacional de Bellas Artes Santiago de Chile.
- Desnudo, Óleo sobre tela, 66 x 44 cm. Pinacoteca Universidad de Concepción.

== Awards ==
- 1936 - First Prize, Official Hall of Santiago.
- 1929 - Gold Medal, Ibero-American Exhibition in Seville.
- 1923 - Portrait Award, Official Hall of Santiago.
- 1920 - Second Medal in Drawing, Official Hall of Santiago.
- 1919 - First Medal, Official Hall of Santiago.
- 1919 - Prize of Honor, Certamen Edwards, Santiago.
- 1916 - Second Medal, Official Hall of Santiago.
- 1916 - Customs Award, Certamen Edwards, Santiago.
