= Samuel Román Rojas =

Chilean sculptor (1907–1990)

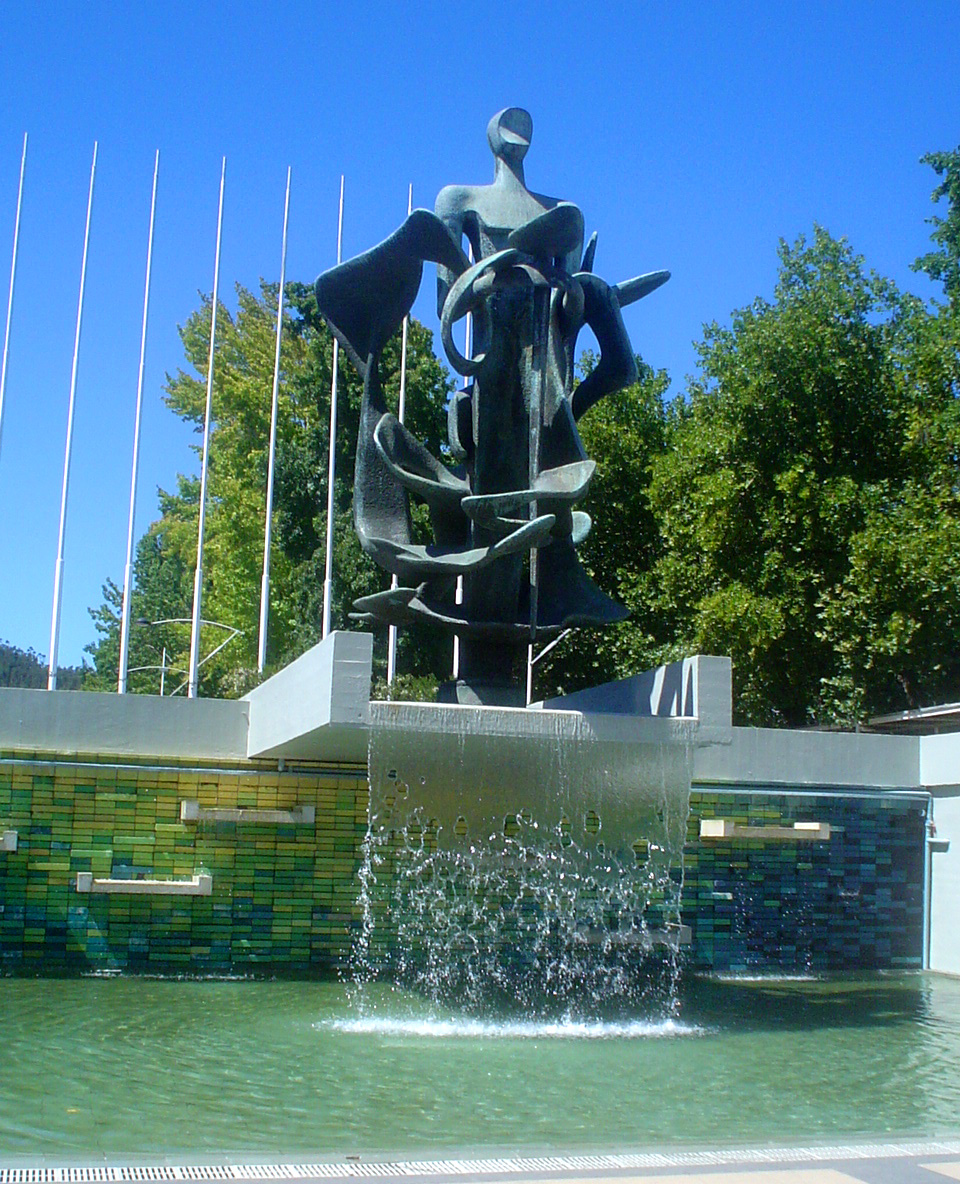
- Sculpture at University of Concepción
- Born: December 8, 1907; Rancagua, Chile
- Died: April 7, 1990 (aged 82); Santiago, Chile
- Education: University of Chile
- Known for: Sculpture

Samuel Román Rojas (December 8, 1907 - April 7, 1990) was a Chilean sculptor. He won the National Prize of Art of Chile in 1964.

Román was born December 8, 1907 in Rancagua, Chile. The town named him Favorite Son in 1956 and awarded him the Santa Cruz de Triana Medal. In 1994 they began a regional painting competition named in his honor.

In 1924 Román began studying sculpture at the School of Fine Arts at the University of Chile. He studied under Carlos Lagarrigue and Virginio Arias among others. After graduation in 1928 he became a professor of Sculpture and Molding at the school. He held the position until 1949.

He received a Humboldt scholarship in 1937 to study at the Berlin Academy. While there he shared a studio with fellow Chileans José Perotti and Israel Roa. His teachers included Ernst Barlach and Käthe Kollwitz. Román undertook further studies in the United States, Brazil, Argentina, Venezuela, and Italy. During this time his work "The Bride of the Wind" won the prize of Honor at the International Exhibition.

In 1939 Román served as Technical Advisor at the Chilean National Museum of Fine Arts. Along with Pablo Neruda, he created the Pedro Aguirre Cerda School of Stonemasons in 1943.

Román began additional travels to Europe in 1968. He traveled to Germany, Belgium, Austria, Italy, and the Soviet Union.

In 1971 he became the President of the Dismantling and Relocation Commission. This position was responsible for relocating monuments affected by the construction of the Santiago Metro. This position lasted until 1974.

Román died in Santiago on April 7, 1990. During his life he held multiple solo exhibitions in Santiago and Rancagua. These included at the National Museum of Fine Arts, the Ministry of Education, and the House of Culture of Ñuñoa. His work was included in group exhibitions held in Germany, Argentina, Brazil, and the United States.

== Awards and honors ==
- 1930 - Gold Medal, Official Salon of Valparaíso
- 1931 - First Prize, Valparaíso and Viña del Mar Week Salon
- 1932 - University of Chile Prize in Sculpture
- 1932 - Van Buren Competition Prize
- 1933 - National History Prize in Sculpture, Arturo M. Edwards Competition
- 1933 - Grand Prize, Club de la Unión, for best sculptural work
- 1933 - First Prize, Applied Arts, Viña del Mar Salon
- 1935 - First Category Prize, Official Salon, Santiago
- 1936 - Prize of Honor, Official Exhibition of Popular Art organized by the Ministry of Labor
- 1937 - First Medal, Marcial Martínez Cuadra Competition
- 1938 - Prize of Honor, International Exhibition of Applied Arts, Berlin
- 1938 - Prize of Honor, Sculpture Section, Official Exhibition of Viña del Mar
- 1940 - Grand Gold Medal, Chilean Sculpture Exhibition in Argentina
- 1940 - Prize of Honor, Sculpture Section, Official Exhibition of Viña del Mar
- 1944-1974 - member of the Council of National Monuments
- 1950 - Grand Honorary Prize, Fine Arts Salon of the Fourth Centenary of the Founding of the city of Concepción, Chile
- 1951 - Grand Prize for Studies and Publications, Madrid Biennial, Spain
- 1958 - appointed Academic Member of the Faculty of Arts
- 1980 - First Prize, Sculpture Competition, Centenary of the National Museum of Fine Arts, Santiago
- 1980 - Tribute from the University of the Americas, Santiago
