= Liceo Javiera Carrera =

Coordinates: 33.4394°S 70.6576°W

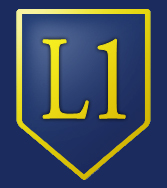
Logo of the high school

Liceo Javiera Carrera or Liceo N°1 de Niñas de Santiago is a high school for girls in Santiago, Chile.

Started as the “Instituto de Señoritas de Santiago” in 1894, the lyceum worked with three courses of study: two of preparatory and one of first year of humanities. Initially, it was not intended to prepare women for further study.

In 1913, Juana Gremler (its first headmaster) established a first studies plan, similar to the curriculum of the men's lyceums. Her changes allowed students to prepare themselves for university education. Among the courses offered were courses in history, language, maths, physical education, religion, domestic economy and hygiene.

After the death of Gremler, Isaura Dinator assumed the headmaster's position. Dinator, in consultation with the government, changed the lyceum's name to "Liceo Javiera Carrera". She also introduced new subjects, including art and economy. Additionally, the French language was made compulsory (English and German remained optional).

It remains one of the most prestigious girls-only schools in Santiago, Chile, a reputation solidified by its many notable alumni.

== Notable alumni ==
- Michelle Bachelet Jeria, former president of Chile
- Soledad Alvear, ex-Senator
- Isabella Torrini, opera singer
- Fernanda Almerch, ex-Senator
- Helen Schadmitt, ex-deputy
- María Elena Carrera, ex-Senator
- Carolina Errázuriz, ex-Minister of Education
- Javiera Bizancio, ex-deputy
- Delfina Guzman, actress
- Mercedes Valdivieso, writer
- Ana Ugalde Arias, ex-deputy
- Isabel Allende, writer
- Gloria Ramos, lawyer
