= University of Concepción =

Chilean private university

Coordinates: 36°49′42″S 73°02′14″W

- Universidad de Concepción
- Motto: Por el desarrollo libre del espíritu.
- Motto in English: For the free development of the spirit.
- Type: Traditional, Private (with State contributions)
- Established: May 14, 1919
- Budget: US$ 66 million
- Rector: María Sepúlveda Carreño
- Academic staff: 1,164
- Students: 27,998
- Undergraduates: 25,870
- Postgraduates: 2,128
- Location: Concepción, Concepción Province, Bío Bío Region, Chile
- Campus: Urban
- Colors: Blue and yellow
- Website: www.udec.cl

Universidad de Concepción (UdeC) is a traditional Chilean private university. The work of the Penquista community, it is one of the most prestigious in Chile, and considered complex due to its extensive research in the various areas of knowledge. Founded on May 14, 1919, it is the third oldest university in Chile, and one of the 25 universities belonging to the Council of Rectors of Chilean Universities.

Its headquarters are located in the city of Concepción, and also has two other campuses in Chillán and Los Ángeles. In a citizen survey carried out in 2012, it was chosen as the symbol that most identifies Penquistas.

It was the first University created in the center-south zone of the country. Besides being the 1st to be constituted as a private law corporation and belong to the Cruz del Sur University Network, it also belongs to the G9 University Network. The University of Concepción also had a pioneering role in the reform movement of Chilean universities that took place at the end of the 1960s. It was the first Chilean university that approved the University Reform in that period (1968), giving greater participation to students in university management. The origins of the MIR (Chile) is also found amid the student movement at the University of Concepción in that period.

The main promoter of the foundation of the university was Chilean educator and lawyer Enrique Molina Garmendia, who sought to create the 1st secular university in Chile. As part of its educational line, the University of Concepción devotes a large part of its budget to academic research. It has in its facilities the most complete museum of Chilean art in the country, several sports centers and a network of 11 libraries, the main one occupying an area of 10,000 m^{2} (110,000 sq ft) with a total of 100,000 volumes.

By 2012, the total number of graduates of this house of studies amounted to 57,000. It also teaches 23,700 students, 2,166 of them graduate programs; 72% of its professors have doctorates or master's degrees; and its infrastructure, with 243,556 m^{2} (2,621,610 sq ft) built, is one of the largest in Chile.

It is currently accredited by the National Accreditation Commission (CNA-Chile) for the maximum period of seven years, from November 2016 to November 2023. Figure in the third position within the Chilean universities according to the webometric classification of the CSIC (July 2017) and in the third position according to the AméricaEconomía 2017 ranking as well as national and international rankings. Within the Chilean universities, it is also among the 11 that figure in the QS 2017 world university ranking, among the 10 that appear in the Times Higher Education 2017 ranking, and among the 25 that appear in the ranking of Scimago Institution Rankings (SIR) 2017, with the 3rd position nationally and 572th worldwide.

Its Concepción campus was declared a National Heritage in 2016 by the Council of National Monuments of Chile; it is the 1st and only University in Chile to have this recognition due to the design and architectural style of its environment that has been implemented in its buildings and campus-level environment since its foundation. The proclamation grants the university special protection and conservation of the campus and its space by the state; therefore, any intervention to the same has to be reported to the Council of Monuments, while any damage and type of vandalism that jeopardizes the integrity and security of the campus will be seriously penalized according to the law that regulates and covers the National Monuments, as well as the prompt construction of the 1st and only Bío Bío Technological Science Park (PACYT) in all of Chile located in the Bío-Bío Region, near the campus of the Universidad de Concepción; which at the same time will be in charge of the administration, organization, and projection of new ideas with a view to the future of it together with the Government of Chile; this initiative is going to be projected as a productive space of the future and a relevant pole of the development of the country, the place where all the creative potential will be housed, knowledge and innovations of high impact will be generated.

== History ==
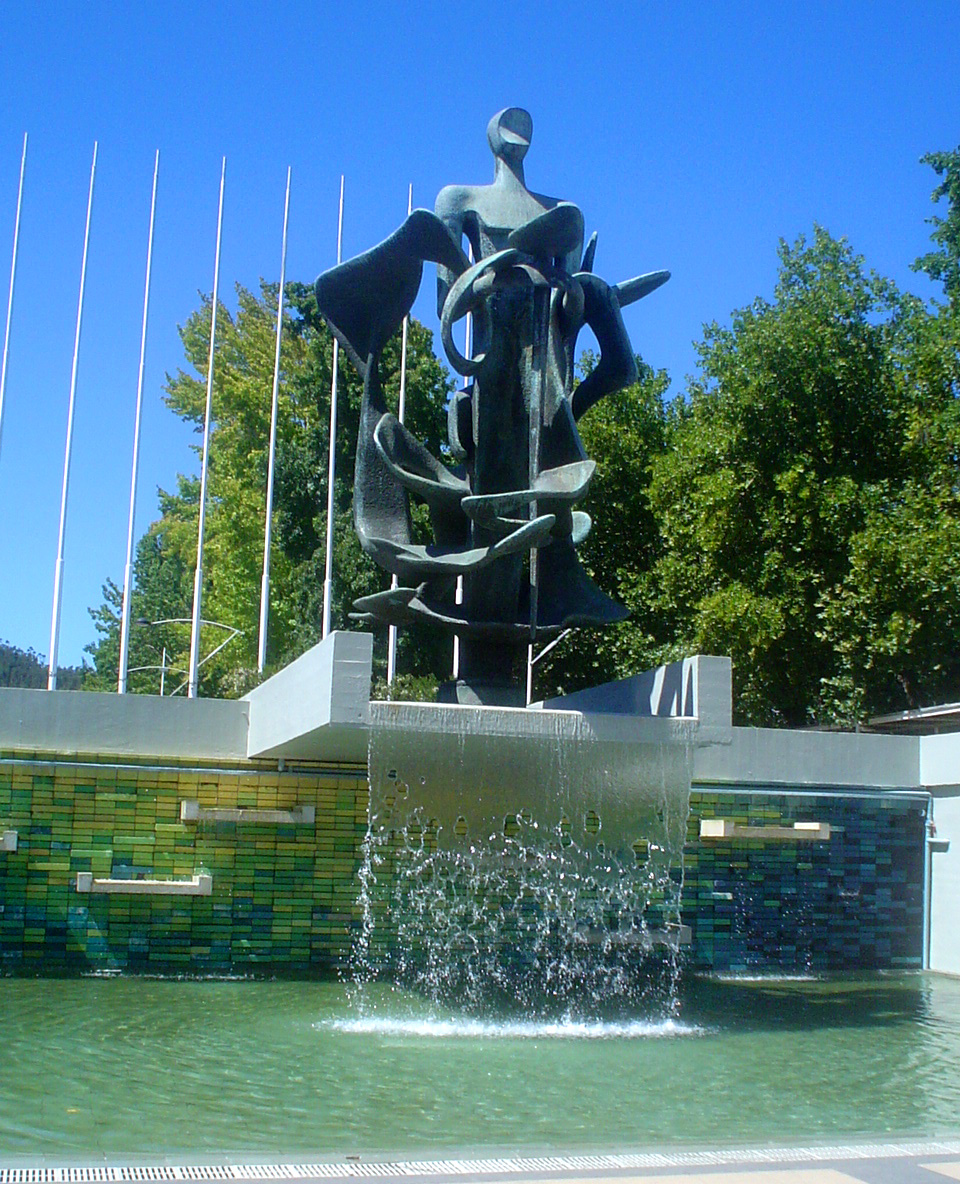
Sculpture in honor of the founders of the university at the University Forum.

=== Background ===
In the late 19th and early 20th centuries, many scholars from Concepción started to plead for the construction of a university for the south of Chile where it would be possible to study professional degrees outside the capital, Santiago. However, a project of this magnitude required a high level of organization, which as yet did not exist. In February 1917, the newspaper El Sur reported:

The idea of creating a university cannot yet be possible because of "the lack of organization of those who want to create it".

— Diario El Sur, 1917.

=== Committee Pro-University ===
On March 23, 1917, the first official meeting took place to realise two goals of the citizens of Concepción: a clinical hospital and a university.

After debate, a committee was named to take charge of the construction of these two projects. The projects were closely related because the hospital would become the base of the new university's medical school. Some notable members of the committee included Enrique Molina Garmendia, Pedro Nolasco, Edmundo Larenas and Virginio Gómez.

=== Foundation ===
The commission then presented the documentation to Congress that would officially create the university. These were sent and approved, and on May 14, 1919, Enrique Molina Garmendia founded the university and became its first rector.

Nowadays, the university is funded by various organisations belonging to the "University of Concepción Corporation". The Lottery is one of the main organisations. With this funding, the University of Concepción has become one of the most modern and important universities in Chile.

== Organization ==
The University of Concepción is divided into three campuses, located in Chillán, Los Ángeles and Concepción. The latter is the main and most important campus.

=== Concepción Campus ===
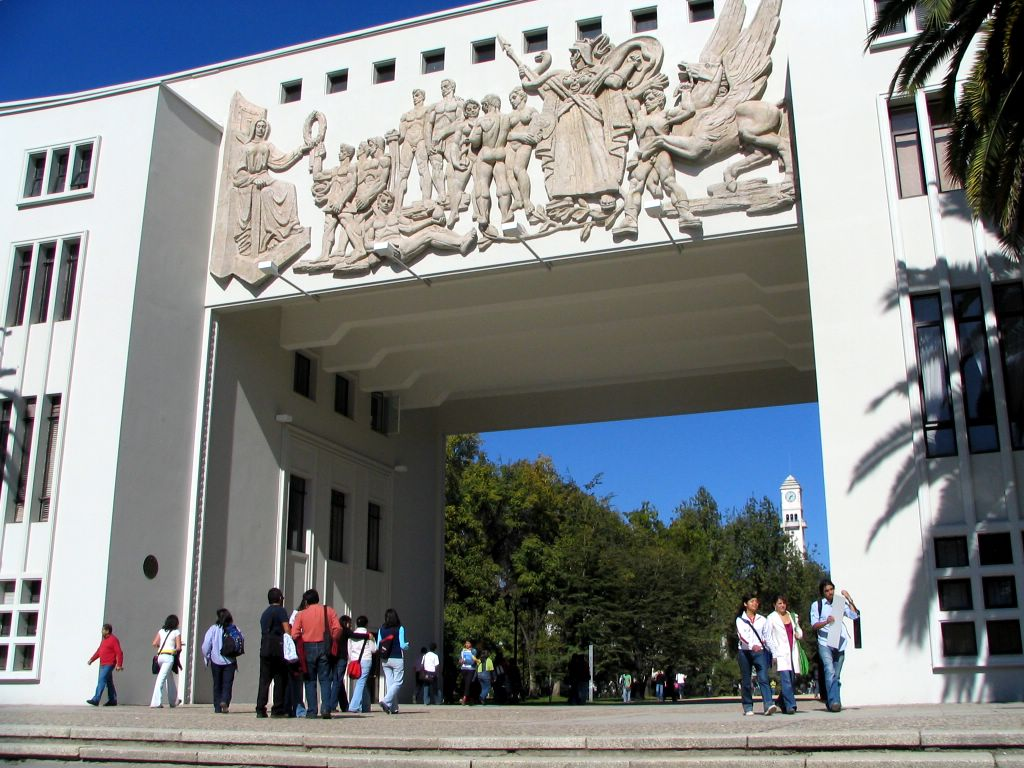
The Arc of Medicine, at the entrance of the Concepción Campus

The university is located in the University District. The whole campus comprises what is known as the Ciudad Universitaria (University City), which also contains museums, sculptures and parks. Today, the campus has an area of 1,425,000 m^{2}, of which 239,856 are built upon. It is the knowledge, science, culture, technology and research centre of the city of Concepción. The Presencia de América Latina mural by Jorge González Camarena is within the Casa del Arte on the university campus.

The central campus features several notable landmarks, including the Campanil bell tower, which has become an emblem of the university.

In the 1960s the students on campus began to start a revolutionary movement akin to that of the MIR. Students on campus began protesting for a democratic change to occur on campus allowing students to start having a voice on campus. Their initial movement was coined with the name Movimiento Universitario de Izquierda (MUI) and actually preceded the creation of the MIR by about a year. Students protested by occupying university buildings, organizing marches on campus, and even fighting off the police sent to shut them down. They also led protests off-campus, leading those in the community to side with them against public issues. The University of Concepción ultimately gave in to the student demands and allowed students to have voting power on both the university board and the hiring administration. Some of the student leaders eventually became leaders for the MIR.

In 2010, the University of Concepción campus was named one of Chile's most important architectural works from the first half of the 20th century. The "Obra Bicentenario" award distinguishes works that, in the last 100 years, have changed the face of Chile's cities and most improved the quality of life of its inhabitants.

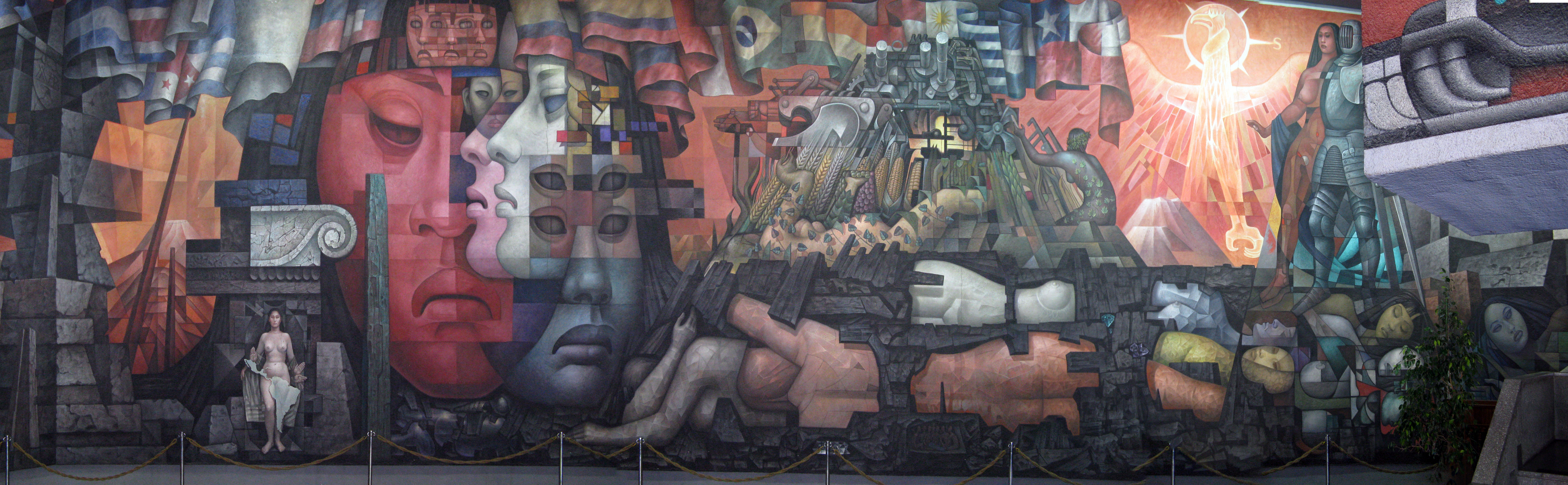
Mural representing the unity between Latin American peoples and cultures. A gift from the Mexican government in the 1960s. Art by Jorge González Camarena.

=== Chillán Campus ===
The Chillán campus was founded in 1955 with the support of many institutions such as the United Nations, the OAS, American and European universities, and others. It mainly focuses on agricultural sciences and has approximately 2,000 students, more than 100 academic staff and 250 administrative staff.

=== Los Ángeles Campus ===
The Los Ángeles campus was founded in 1962 at the request of the people of the province to the university rector, David Stitchkin Branover. Currently, it has 1,300 students and 35 full-time teachers, plus other part-time academic staff.

== Schools and Departments ==
University rankings

Global – Overall
- ARWU World: 901–1000 (2023)
- QS World: =613 (2026)
- THE World: 1201–1500 (2024)
- USNWR Global: =816 (2023)

The University of Concepción is made up of 19 schools and departments:

- Department of Agronomy.
- Department of Architecture, Urban Planning and Geography.
- Department of Biological Sciences.
- School of Economics and Business Administration.
- Department of Physical Sciences and Mathematics.
- Department of Forestry.
- School of Law and Social Sciences.
- Department of Natural and Oceanographic Sciences.
- Department of Chemical Sciences.
- Department of Nursing.
- Department of Social Sciences.
- School of Veterinary Science.
- School of Education.
- Department of Pharmaceutical Chemistry.
- School of Humanities and Arts.
- Department of Engineering.
- Department of Agricultural Engineering.
- School of Medicine.
- School of Dentistry.
- School of Pharmacy.
- School of Environmental Sciences

== Administration ==
The university's current rector is Carlos Saavedra Rubilar. The university belongs to the Council of Rectors of Traditional Chilean Universities. The rectors that have directed the university have been:

Rector	Period
Enrique Molina Garmendia	1919–1956
David Stitchkin Branover	1956–1962
Ignacio González Ginouvés	1962–1968
David Stitchkin Branover	1968
Edgardo Enríquez Frödden	1969–1972
Carlos Von Plessing Baentsch	1973
Guillermo González Bastias	1973–1975
Heinrich Rochna Viola	1975–1980
Guillermo Clericus Etchegoyen	1980–1987
Carlos Von Plessing Baentsch	1987–1990
César Augusto Parra Muñoz	1990–1997
Sergio Lavanchy Merino	1998–2018
Carlos Saavedra Rubilar	2018–2026
María Jacqueline Sepúlveda Carreño	2026–

== See also ==
- Concepción
- List of universities in Chile

=== External links ===
- University of Concepción webpage
- "Presencia de América Latina" webpage
- Short documentary about the mural "Presencia de América Latina"
