= Fernando Álvarez de Sotomayor y Zaragoza =

Spanish painter (1875–1960)

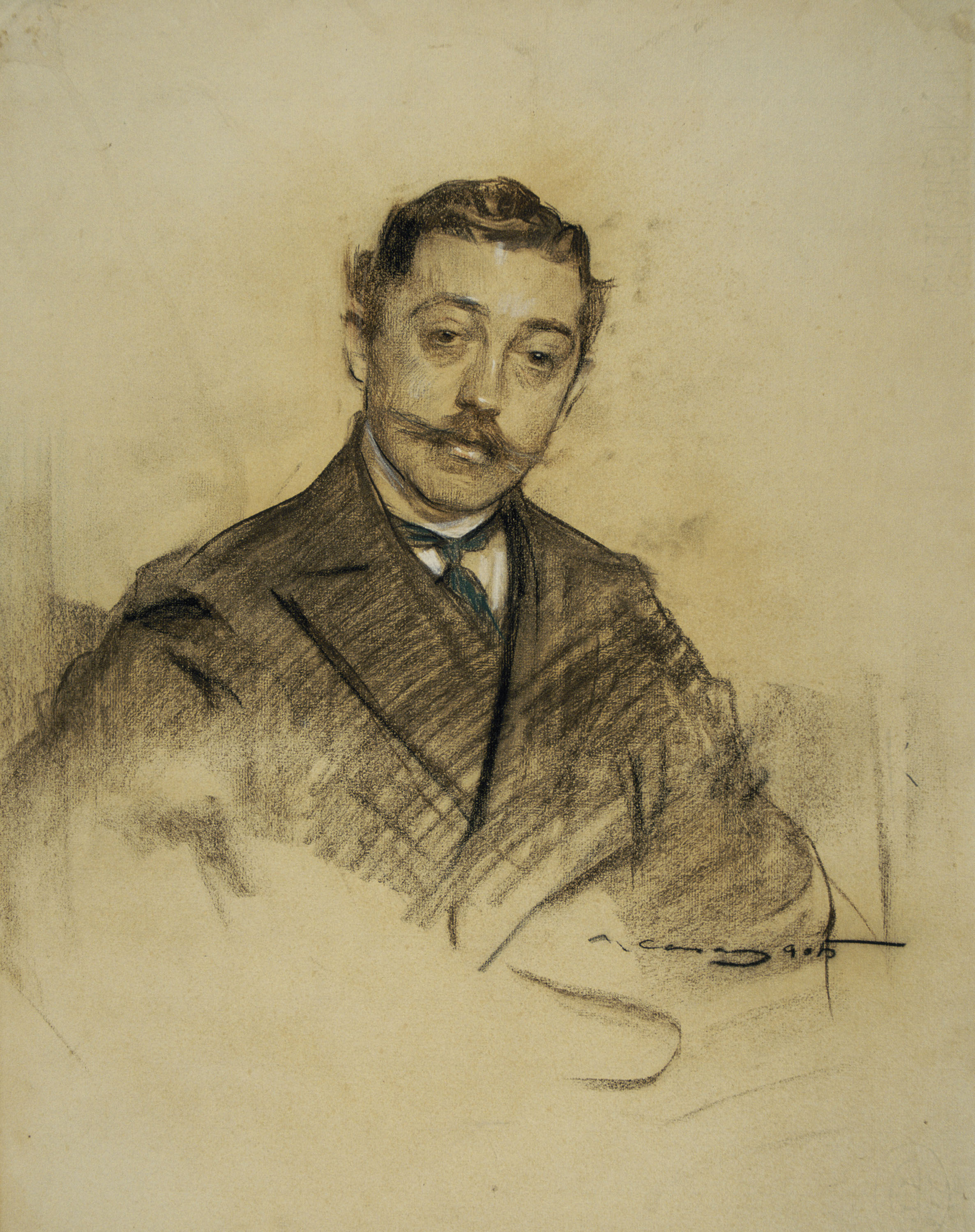
- Fernando Álvarez de Sotomayor by Ramon Casas (MNAC)
- Born: September 25, 1875; Ferrol, Spain
- Died: March 17, 1960 (aged 84); Madrid, Spain
- Known for: painting
- Awards: Grand Cross of the Orden de Alfonso X el Sabio

Fernando Álvarez de Sotomayor y Zaragoza (September 25, 1875 – March 17, 1960) was a Galician (Spanish) painter.

== Biography ==
Álvarez de Sotomayor was born in Ferrol. He studied at the Colegio Mª Cristina in El Escorial and at the age of 10 years was the only person to draw a portrait of King Alfonso XII in his death bed (the drawing still belongs to the painter's family) and participated in courses of philosophy and literature in Madrid. In 1899 he achieved a scholarship to continue his studies in Rome, where he lived for four years. Before his return to Spain in 1904, he visited France, Belgium and the Netherlands. He married Pilar de Castro. They had seven children. Around 1910 he moved to Chile, where he held the chair of coloration and composition at the Academy of Painting (Santiago, Chile) and later became its director.

In 1915, the family returned to Spain. Back in Madrid, he was nominated court painter of Alfonso XIII. In 1922 he became director of the Museo del Prado and member of the Escuela de Bellas Artes de San Fernando. As director of the Museo del Prado, he was in charge until 1931 when he was obliged to leave the post due to the rise of the republic in Spain. He later became director of the museum a second time after the Spanish Civil War until he died. He played a great role in hiding most of the paintings the museum held during the Spanish civil war and later on recovering them. From 1953 to 1955 he was also director of the Real Academia de Bellas Artes de San Fernando. He died in Madrid, aged 84.

== Awards ==
Álvarez de Sotomayor was multiple awarded. In 1904 he won the second and in 1906 the first medal at the Exposición Nacional de Bellas Artes (national exposition of fine arts). In 1907 he won the Exposición Internacional de Barcelona (international exposition of Barcelona), as well as medals in Munich, Buenos Aires and Liège, and was decorated with the Grand Cross of the Orden de Alfonso X el Sabio, The great Cross of Isabel La Catolica, Great Cross Of Alfonso XII and with the Italian Court medal.
