= Elisabeth Dored =

Norwegian artist and author (1908–1972)

Elisabeth Braadland Dored (née Elisabeth Sophie Wiel Braadland; 22 March 1908 – 6 September 1972) was a Norwegian visual artist and author.

== Biography ==
Elisabeth Sophie Wiel Braadland was born at Idd (now Halden) in Østfold, Norway. Her parents were Birger Braadland (1879–1960) and Ragna Abigael Vogt Stang (1881–1972). She studied art at the Académie Scandinave in Paris under Henry de Waroquier (1881–1970), and trained at the Académie de l'Art Moderne with Othon Friesz (1879-1949) during 1929. She attended the Norwegian National Academy of Fine Arts in Oslo where she studied under Halfdan Strøm in 1931.

In 1935, she married Latvian born cinematographer John Dored (1881–1954). She debuted as an author with For meg er jorden rund (1955) in which she tells about the life and career of her husband.

She won the Norwegian Booksellers' Prize (Bokhandlerprisen) in 1964 for her historic romance novel Jeg elsket Tiberius. The novel was translated into English by Naomi Walford. During 1963, the novel was published under the title, I Loved Tiberius in Great Britain by Methuen Publishing and in the United States by Pantheon Books.

== See also ==
- List of historical novelists
- List of Norwegian writers
