= Elsa Danson Wåghals =

Swedish visual artist (1885–1977)

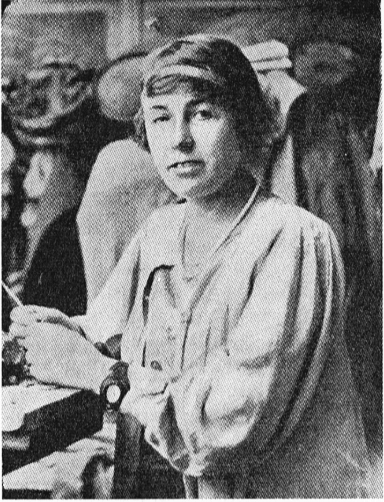
- Born: Anna Ingeborg Elsa Danson; 13 January 1885; Stockholm, Sweden
- Died: 30 March 1977; Lidingö, Sweden
- Burial place: Lidingö Cemetery
- Other names: Anna Danson, Elsa Danson, Elsa Wåghals
- Education: Althins Painting School, Konstfack, Nice Academy of Sculpture, Académie Scandinave, British School at Rome
- Movement: Modernism
- Partner: Lars Theodor Hyllander (circa 1935)

Elsa Danson Wåghals (née Anna Ingeborg Elsa Danson; 13 January 1885 – 30 March 1977) was a Swedish visual artist, known for painting and sculpture.

== Biography ==
Elsa Danson Wåghals was born as Anna Ingeborg Elsa Danson on 13 January 1885, in Stockholm, Sweden. She was one of three daughters of Anna (née Petrini) and accountant Carl August Wilhelm Danson. She took the name Wåghals sometime in the 1910s, it is a family name on her father's side.

During the 1910s she studied at Althins Painting School and at the Technical School (Swedish: Tekniska skolan; now Konstfack) in Stockholm.

Wåghals worked for seventeen years as a telegraph commissioner at the Royal Telegraph Office, and left her role in 1920 to study art in France.

In Nice, she studied under sculptor Fabio Stecchi, and at the Nice Academy of Sculpture. She studied in 1923 to 1924 with André Lhote, and Otte Sköld at the Académie Scandinave in Paris; as well as studied with Antoine Bourdelle and Ossip Zadkine in Paris. While in Paris, she exhibited her work at the Salon of the Société Nationale des Beaux-Arts, Salon d'Automne, Société des Artistes Indépendants, and Salon des Tuileries. Wåghals also studied drawing at the British School at Rome.

Her paintings featured themes of landscapes, and city scenes. Wåghals made public art for Stockholm City Hall.

Wåghals died on 30 March 1977, in Lidingö, Sweden, and is buried in Lidingö Cemetery. Her work can be found in the collection at Östergötland Museum.
