= Académie Scandinave =

French art academy (1919–1935)

Coordinates: 48.8429°N 2.3306°E

- 6, rue Jules-Chaplain, Paris, France

Information
- Established: 1919
- Closed: 1935; 91 years ago
- President: Gunnar Cederschiöld
- Director: Lena Börjeson

Académie Scandinave (English: Scandinavian Academy) was a private art academy in Paris that existed between 1919 and 1935. The school was located in the Maison Watteau art gallery, at no. 6 rue Jules-Chaplain. It was free and focused on figurative painting and sculpture.

== History ==
Maison Watteau was founded by Lena Börjeson in 1919, with the goal to sell Nordic artists’ work in Paris, as an atelier and an artists’ social club. It was backed by art dealer, Gösta Olsson; businessperson and director of Tändstickbolaget, Gunnar Cederschiöld; and Swedish ambassador, Johan Ehrensvärd.

Académie Scandinave was led by Nordic visual artists in the early years, including Lena Börjeson, Otte Sköld, Henrik Sørensen, Adam Fischer, and Per Krohg. From 1927 until 1935, the school was led by French artists.

== Notable faculty ==
=== Painting faculty ===
- Charles Dufresne (1876–1938)
- Othon Friesz (1879–1949)
- Marcel Gromaire (1892–1971)
- Charles Edmond Kayser (1882–1965)
- Per Krohg (1889–1965)
- Otte Sköld (1894–1958)
- Henry de Waroquier (1881–1970)

=== Sculpture faculty ===
- Paul Cornet (1892–1977)
- Louis Dejean (1872–1953)
- Charles Despiau (1874–1946)

== Notable alumni ==
- Anna Agnér (1896–1977) Swedish painter
- Graciela Aranis (1908–1996) Chilean painter, cartoonist
- Emmanuel Auricoste (1908–1995) French sculptor, medalist
- Signe Barth (1895–1982) Swedish painter, teacher
- Ralston Crawford (1906–1978) American painter, lithographer, photographer
- Elisabeth Dored (1908–1972) Norwegian artist and author
- Aaron Douglas (1899–1979) American painter
- Karin Fryxell (1911–2003) Swedish painter
- Flory Gate (1904–1998) Swedish textile artist, designer, farmer, peace activist
- William Edwin Gebhardt (1907–1975) American painter
- Lucius Crowell (1911–1988), was an American realist artist.
- Francis Gruber (1912–1948) French painter
- Virginia Haggard (1915–2006), also known as Virginia Edith Haggard Leirens, British photographer
- Michael Loew (1907–1985) American painter
- Saidie May (1879–1951) American art collector
- Siri Meyer (1898–1985) Swedish cartoonist, painter
- Astrid Noack (1888–1954), Danish sculptor
- Inés Puyó (1906–1996) Chilean painter
- Francis Tailleux (1912–1981) French painter
- Pierre Tal-Coat (1905–1985) French painter, printmaker
- Maria Helena Vieira da Silva (1908–1992) Portuguese-French painter
- Elsa Danson Wåghals (1885–1977) Swedish modernist painter, sculptor
- Heini Waser (1913–2008) Swiss painter
- Hale Woodruff (1900–1980) American painter
- Ingrid Zuhr (1905–2001) Swedish painter, art writer
- Aaron Douglas (1899–1979), American painter, illustrator, and arts educator
