= Inés Puyó =

Chilean painter (1906–1996)

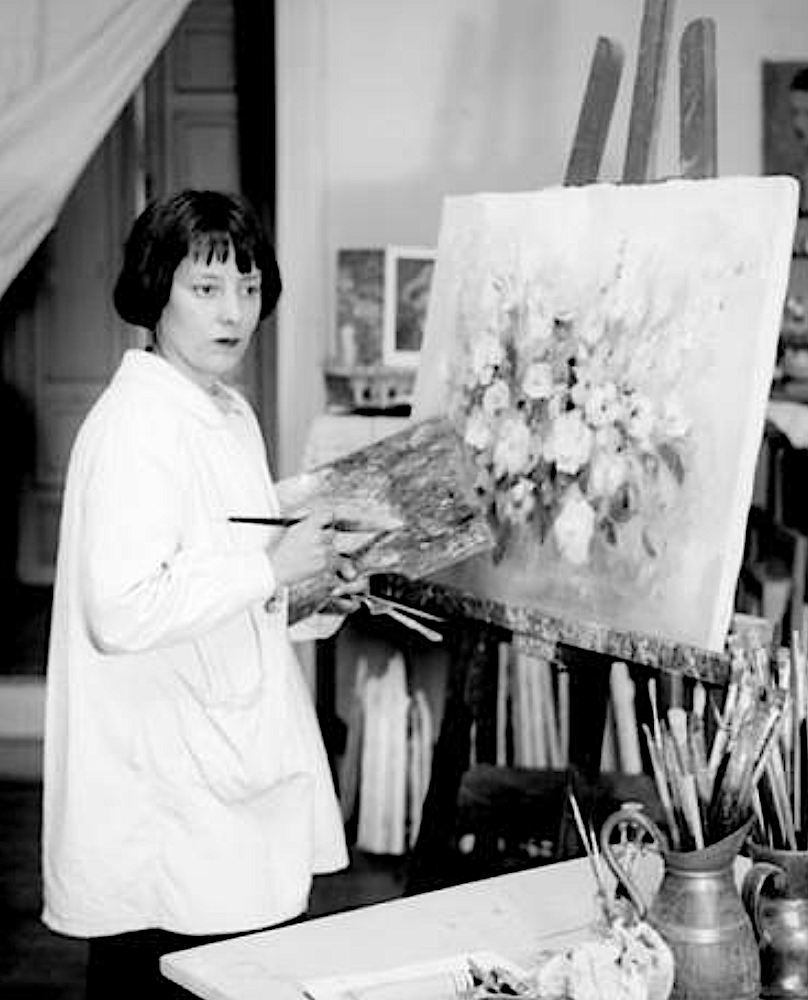
- Inés Puyó, circa 1927
- Born: Inés Puyó León; December 9, 1906; Santiago, Chile
- Died: March 21, 1996 (aged 89); Santiago, Chile
- Other names: Ines Puyo Leon
- Education: Escuela de Bella Artes de Santiago, Académie Scandinave, Escuela de Artes Aplicadas
- Occupation(s): Visual artist, teacher
- Known for: Painting
- Movement: Grupo Montparnasse

Inés Puyó León (December 9, 1906 – March 21, 1996) was a Chilean painter and teacher. She taught at the Instituto Chileno Italiano (Chilean Italian Institute) in Santiago for many years. Themes in her artwork included still lifes, flowers, religious imagery, and the seascapes of Puerto Montt.

== Biography ==
Inés Puyó León was born on December 9, 1906, in Santiago, Chile. She studied at the Escuela de Bella Artes de Santiago from 1927 to 1928, under Juan Francisco González and Ricardo Richon Brunet.

On a scholarship from the Chilean government, Puyó traveled to France in 1930. She studied at the Académie Scandinave in Paris, under Henry de Waroquier, Othon Friesz, and André Lhote. In the 1930s she continued her training in New York City, under Amédée Ozenfant.

After returning to Chile, she joined the avant-garde Grupo Montparnasse. Puyó took an enamel on metals class at the Escuela de Artes Aplicadas in Santiago, under José Perotti. From 1950 to 1960 she was a professor at the Instituto Chileno Italiano (Chilean Italian Institute). She was awarded a seat in the Academia Chilena de Bellas Artes (or Chilean Academy of Fine Arts; 1983).

She died on March 21, 1996 in Santiago. Puyó's works can be found in public collections, including at the Museo Nacional de Bellas Artes, the Museo de Arte Contemporaneo of the Universidad de Chile, the Pinacoteca of the Universidad de Concepción, and the Museo Minicipal de Bellas Artes in Viña del Mar, among others.
