= Anna Agnér =

Swedish painter (1896–1977)

- Born: Anna Naemi Gabriella Johansson; 3 October 1896; Mörbylånga Municipality, Sweden
- Died: 21 November 1977 (aged 81); Danderyd Municipality, Sweden
- Burial place: Djursholm Cemetery, Djursholm, Danderyd Municipality, Sweden
- Other names: Anna Thorell, Anna Agnér
- Education: Skåne School of Painting, Académie Scandinave
- Occupation: Painter
- Spouse(s): Bror Hilbert Thorell (m. 1918–; divorced), Gunnar Teodor Agnér (m. 1931–)
- Children: 1

Anna Naemi Gabriella Agnér (née Johansson; 3 October 1896 – 21 November 1977) was a Swedish painter. She lived in Stockholm, and spent significant time in Paris.

== Biography ==
Anna Naemi Gabriella Johansson was born on 3 October 1896, in the Mörbylånga Municipality, she was the daughter of Sigrid, and of Bror Johansson, an organist and elementary school teacher. The family initially lived in Hulterstad, on the Baltic island of Öland, and later moved to Mörrum.

She studied with the sculptor Gottfrid Larsson, and the painter Otte Sköld in Stockholm. She also attended the Skåne School of Painting (Swedish: Skånska målarskolan).

In 1918, she married Bror Hilbert Thorell, a merchant, and they had one son. Their marriage eventually ended. By 1931, she remarried to Gunnar Teodor Agnér, and they moved together to Stocksund, near Stockholm. Agnér made study trips to Paris where she attended classes the Académie Scandinave.

Agnér was known for her paintings of flowers, landscapes, portraits, and still lifes. She made ink drawings during her travels to Greece and Palestine. Her work can be found in museum collections including the museum in Ulricehamn. She is profiled in the Svenskt kvinnobiografiskt lexikon (SKBL), a Swedish biographical dictionary.

She died on 21 November 1977, and was buried at Djursholm Cemetery.
