= Lena Börjeson =

Swedish sculptor (1879–1976)

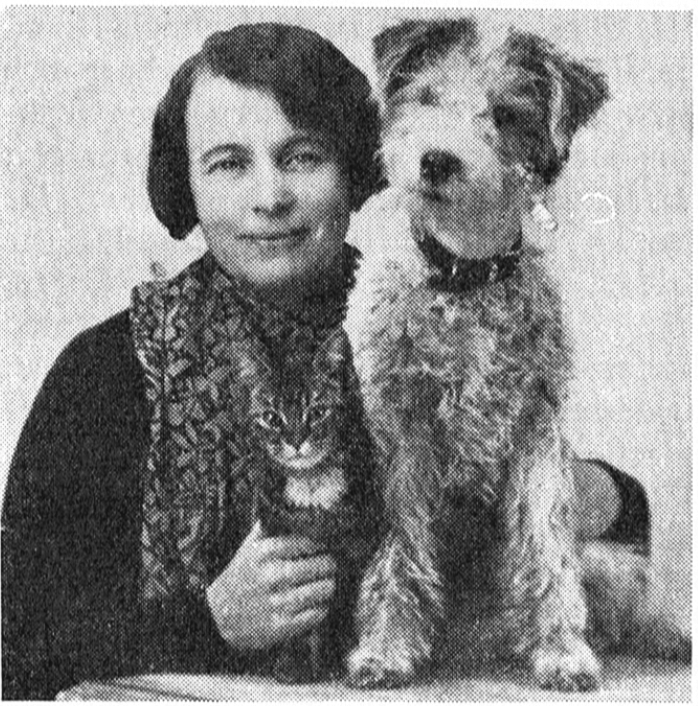
- Born: Helena Börjeson; 13 October 1879; Copenhagen, Denmark
- Died: 14 April 1976 (aged 96); Stockholm, Sweden
- Occupations: Sculptor, writer, art dealer, educator, academic administrator
- Partner: Ivan Lönnberg (1917–1918)
- Father: Johan Laurentius Helenus Börjeson

Helena "Lena" Börjeson (13 October 1879 – 14 April 1976) was a Swedish sculptor, writer, art dealer, and the founding director of two arts school. In 1916, she moved to Paris to opened the art gallery Maison Watteau, and she became the director of the associated art school Académie Scandinave in Paris.

== Early life and family ==
Helena "Lena" Börjeson was born on 13 October 1879, in Copenhagen, Denmark. She was the daughter of Louise Frederikke Anna-Mathea (Vitté) Bartholin, a Danish aristocrat, and Johan Laurentius Helenus Börjeson, a professor of sculpture at the Royal Swedish Academy of Fine Arts in Stockholm. Of five siblings, two of her brothers were visual artists, Gunnar Börjeson (1877–1945) and Börje Börjeson (1881–1958).

She created small statues in her early career, some of which were sold at Herman Bergman Konstgjuteri AB. In 1916 during World War I, she traveled to Paris where two of her brothers were living. She remained in Paris throughout the war, where she met Swedish artist Ivan Lönnberg, a volunteer in the French army. They dated until his death in April 1918 in the war, she was pregnant when he died and lost their child.

== Career ==
In 1919, she started researching a meeting-place for visiting Swedish artists in Paris, backed by art dealer, Gösta Olsson; businessperson and director of Tändstickbolaget, Gunnar Cederschiöld; and Swedish ambassador Johan Ehrensvärd. She founded Maison Watteau in Montparnasse, named after the eighteenth-century artist Antoine Watteau. The goal of Maison Watteau was to sell Nordic artists work in Paris, an atelier, and for a social artists' club. In 1923, the first exhibition took place.

The building was named L'Association des Artistes Scandinaves, which was restructured as Académie Scandinave. Börjeson became the director of the art school Académie Scandinave, which was active from 1919 until 1935. By 1924 many noted French artists were hired at the school as teachers, including Paul Cornet, Louis Dejean, Charles Dufresne, Marcel Gromaire, and Charles Despiau. Support for the school ended in 1935, while Börjeson was vacationing in Sweden for the summer. She was left without a role, and no salary, and as result she remained in Sweden. In her autobiography, Mitt livs lapptäcka (1957), she described in detail her time in Paris.

After returning to Sweden, she founded Lena Börjeson's Sculpture School (Swedish: Lena Börjesons Skulpturskola) in Stockholm in 1940.

She died on 14 April 1976, in Stockholm. Her artwork can be found in the public collection at the Nationalmuseum in Stockholm.

== Publications ==
- Börjeson, Lena (1957). Mitt livs lapptäcka [My Life's Patchwork Quilt]. Bonnier.
