= Elof Hellquist =

Swedish linguist and swedish author of dictionaries

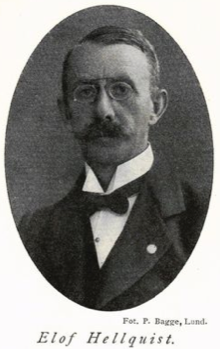
Hellquist photographed by P. Bagge

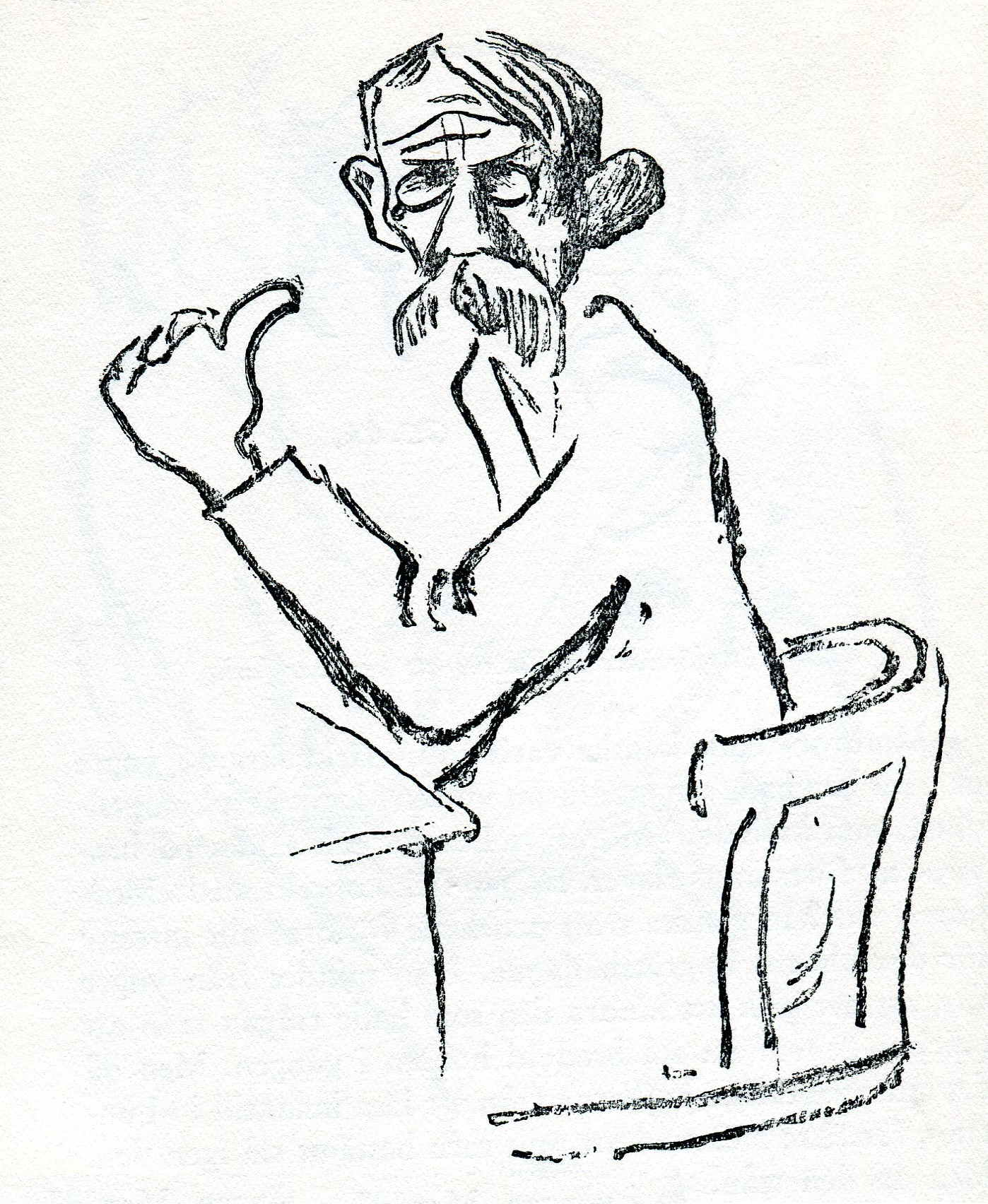
Caricature of Hellquist by his student Gunnar Cederschiöld

Gustaf Elof Hellquist (1864–1933) was a Swedish linguist. He was professor of Nordic languages at Lund University between 1914 and 1929 and authored the standard work Swedish Etymological Dictionary.

== Biography ==
Elof Hellquist was born on 26 June 1864 in Norrköping and took his matriculation examination there in 1883. He became Doctor of Philosophy in Uppsala in 1890 and worked as docent of Nordic languages and adjunct at a grammar school. Between the years 1894 and 1903 he was an editor of Svenska Akademiens ordbok. He became lecturer of Swedish and German at Lund in 1898 until he went over to Gothenburg in 1903 with the same title, in addition to again serving as docent. In 1914 he returned to Lund, now to become Professor of Nordic languages.

Hellquist wrote a great amount of academic literature, in topics such as etymology, historical linguistics, toponymy and grammar. He was also a translator of Ancient Greek literature.

He was member of the Royal Society of Arts and Sciences in Gothenburg and was awarded professorial honours and titular dignity in 1907.
