= Erik Wennerstrand =

Swedish artist

Erik Wennerstrand (born 1963) is a Swedish artist working chiefly with sculpture, poetry and visual art. He resides and works in Stockholm. Previously, Wennerstrand had the personal name Per and during a period signed his work Erik Holm. Wennerstrand has had numerous exhibitions in art halls and galleries such as Västerås art museum 2002, Gallery Magnus Karlsson, Stockholm 2002, Millesgården art museum 2004-05, Gallery Paul Kleefeld, Copenhagen 2005, Luleå art hall 2007, Örnsköldsviks art hall 2009, Vallentuna cultural center 2014 and Lund Cathedral, the crypt 2015. In addition, he has executed a number of commissions in Stockholm and throughout Sweden.

He is an alumnus of the Västerås Art School, Pernbys Painting School and Stockholm Art Academy.
