= Lucius Crowell =

American realist artist

- Born: Lucius Alfred Crowell Jr. January 22, 1911; Chicago, Illinois, U.S.
- Died: March 9, 1988 (aged 77); Phoenixville, Pennsylvania, U.S.
- Citizenship: American
- Education: Pennsylvania Academy of the Fine Arts, Barnes Foundation
- Known for: Painting, ceramics
- Website: luciuscrowell.com

Lucius Alfred (January 22, 1911 – March 9, 1988) (born Lucius Alfred Crowell Jr.) was an American realist artist, active primarily in Pennsylvania and the Mid-Atlantic region. His work is held in the permanent collections of major American museums, including the Pennsylvania Academy of the Fine Arts (PAFA), Philadelphia Museum of Art (PMA), and Boston Museum of Fine Arts.

== Biography ==
Crowell was born in 1911, in Chicago, Illinois. He went to Art Institute of Chicago, Williams College, after which he went to Chester Springs School of the Pennsylvania Academy of the Fine Arts. In Paris, he studied at the Académie Scandinave and Académie de la Grande Chaumière. Later, he studied independently with Franklin Watkins, and Arthur Beecher Carles. He continued his studies at the Barnes Foundation.

After his travels, he taught art in Wilmington, Delaware, the Kent School in Connecticut and Chester County, Pennsylvania.

Throughout his career, Crowell exhibited widely at prominent institutions, including the Art Institute of Chicago (1931–1936), the Whitney Museum of American Art (1933), the Pennsylvania Academy of the Fine Arts (1932–1962), and the National Academy of Design (1958). He had solo exhibitions at New York's Ferargil Gallery (1950, 1951, 1954), the Sagittarius Gallery (1958), and the Vose Galleries in Boston.

Crowell died on March 9, 1988, in Pennsylvania.

== Public collections ==
- Boston Museum of Fine Arts
- Pennsylvania Academy of the Fine Arts
- Philadelphia Museum of Art
- Columbus Museum of Art
