= Pernby School of Painting =

Art school in Stockholm, Sweden

Coordinates: 59°20′17″N 18°04′06″E

Pernby School of Painting Pernbys målarskola
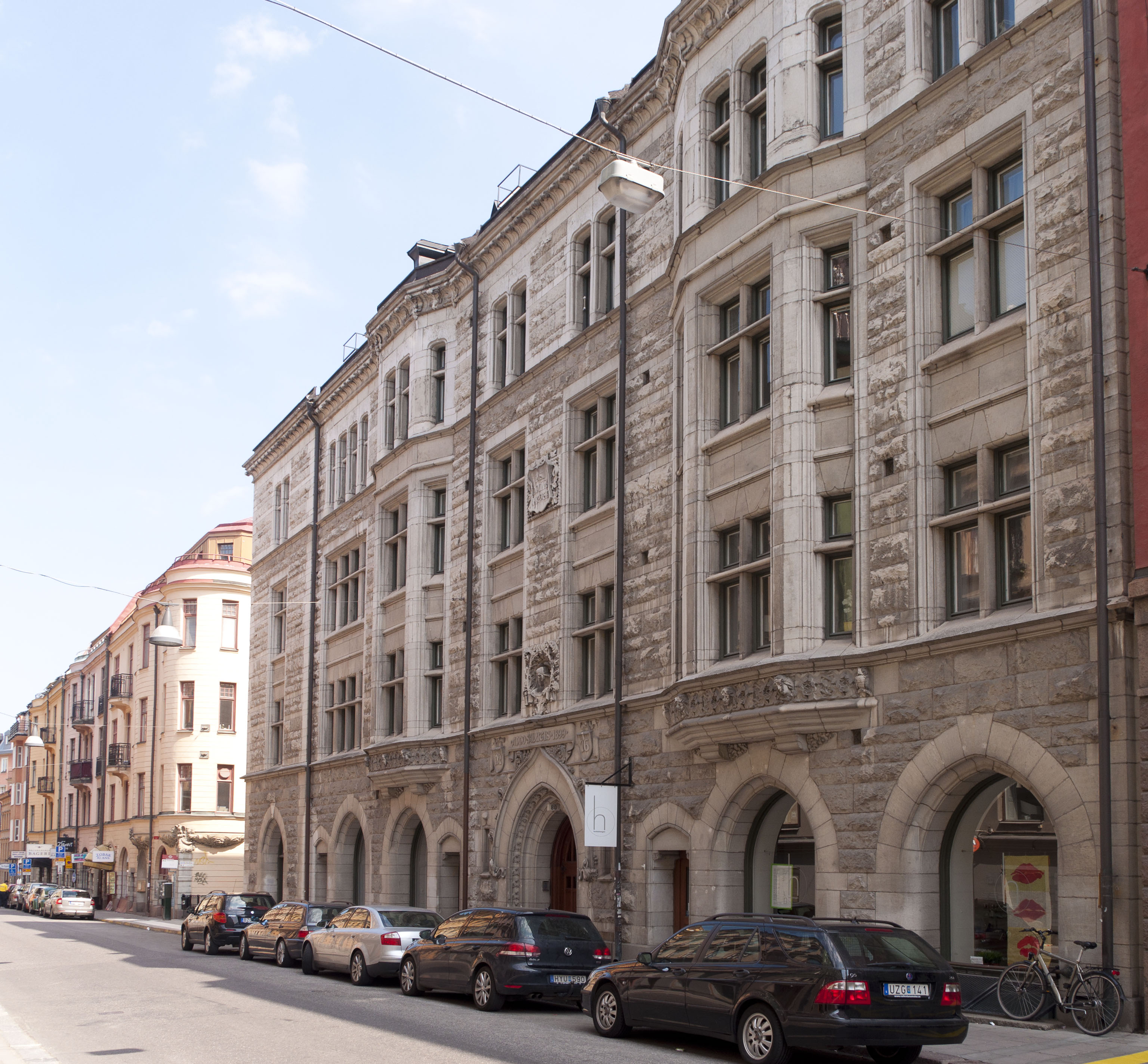
- Pernby School of Painting in Stockholm

Location
- Stockholm, Sweden

Information
- Former name: Otte Skölds Art School
- Founded: 1927
- Founders: Otte Sköld, Åke Pernby (starting in 1929)

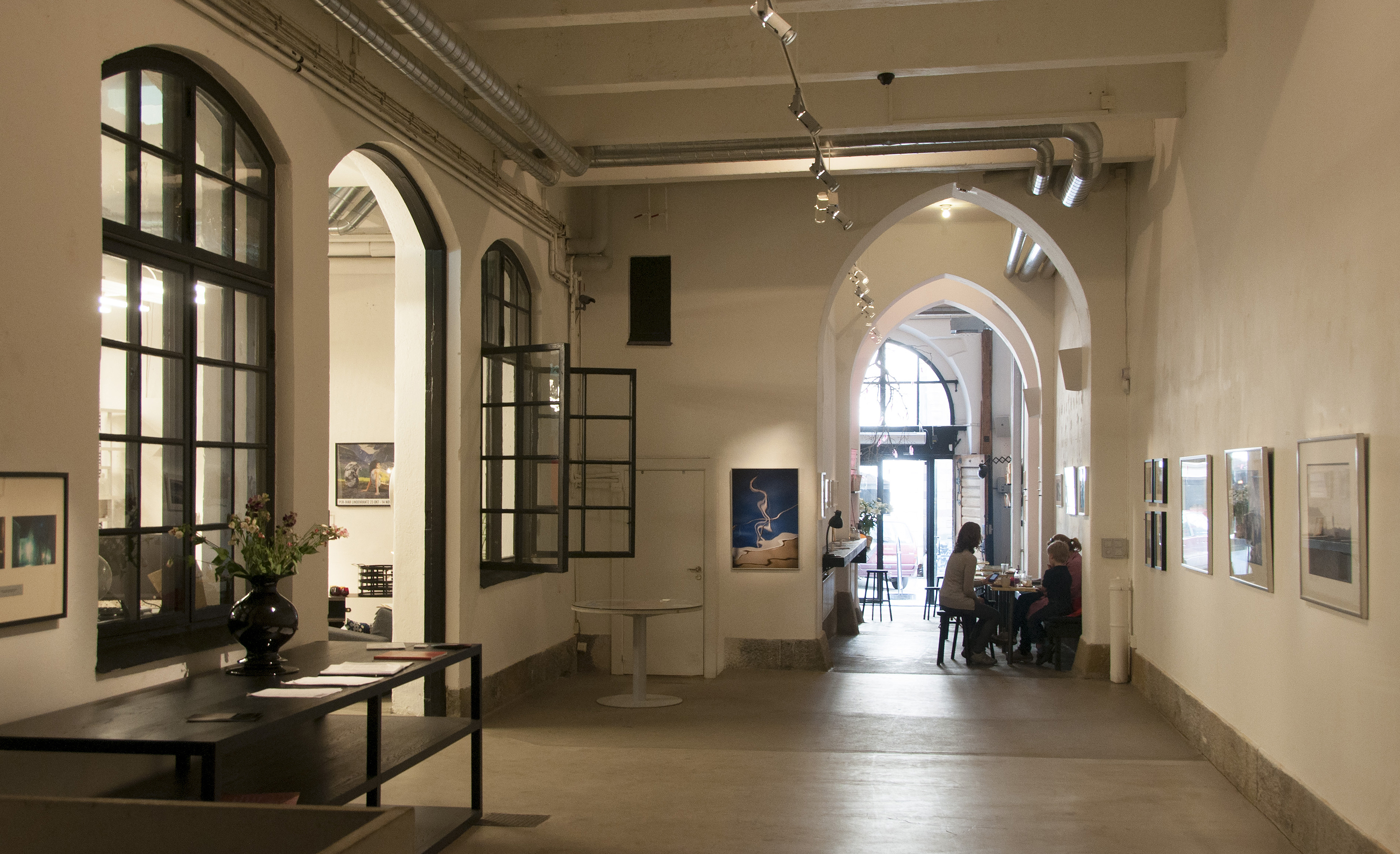
Pernby School of Painting.

Pernby School of Painting (Swedish: Pernbys målarskola, lit. 'Pernby Art School'), formerly Otte Skölds Art School (Swedish: Otte Skölds målarskola, lit. 'Otte Skölds Art School'), in Stockholm was founded in 1927 by Otte Sköld (1894–1958), and in 1929 he was joined by Åke Pernby (1901–1981).

The school was renamed in 1949, when Otte Skölds became director of the Nationalmuseum, and Åke Pernby was in charge as rector. The school offers a two years training in painting and subscription, and prepares students for a higher education in Fine Arts.

== Alumni ==
- Erik Wennerstrand (born 1963), Swedish artist
