= I Loved Tiberius =

1959 book by Elisabeth Dored

- First UK edition
- Author: Elisabeth Dored
- Original title: Jeg elsket Tiberius
- Translator: Naomi Walford
- Language: Norwegian
- Publisher: Methuen (UK); Pantheon Books (USA)
- Publication date: 1959
- Publication place: Norway
- Media type: Print (Hardback & Paperback)
- Pages: 368
- ISBN: 978-82-03-19359-0

Jeg elsket Tiberius is a 1959 romance novel by Elisabeth Dored. It was first translated into English by Naomi Walford in Great Britain by Methuen and United States by Pantheon Books in 1963 under the name I Loved Tiberius. The novel was written as a careful reappraisal of the contemporary sources, placing Julia and Tiberius in a more positive light. The novel is set in 1st century BC Rome, centred on Julia the Elder, the daughter of Augustus and her life right up until her death. The novel begins with Julia's birth and her mother being forbidden to see her. The plot is mainly focused on Julia's love life, notably her relationship with her stepbrother, Tiberius.

== Plot ==
The story begins in Rome. Julia, the daughter of Gaius Julius Caesar Octavianus, suffers with an awkward relationship between her and her sixteen-year-old stepbrother Tiberius. He is frequently unfair to her leading to them often fighting and them being punished. Through the harshness of living in Livia's strict household Tiberius becomes attracted to Julia's more affectionate nature despite her being merely thirteen. Very quickly Julia becomes smitten with him and he obsessed with her.

Tiberius decides that he wishes to marry Julia and plans to ask Augustus. However, before he has a chance, Augustus announces that Julia will be married to Marcellus as soon as she turns fourteen. Marcellus, who is in love with a consul's daughter, confides the truth to Julia. She gives him her blessing to go on seeing this girl but the affair ends after she becomes pregnant and her father marries her to a friend. Meanwhile, Julia discovers Tiberius is conducting affairs with other women. Julia and Marcellus comfort each other and finally consummate their marriage. Nonetheless, Julia finds Marcellus repugnant.

Marcellus becomes jealous of Agrippa when Augustus nearly dies from an illness and names Agrippa his heir by giving him his signant ring. Shortly after Augustus recovers Agrippa and Marcella (His wife and Julia's cousin) nearly die in a fire at their house that was purposely lit. Agrippa confides to Julia that he suspects Livia might be involved. He subsequently decides to leave Rome and travel to Lesbos.

Marcellus dies from the illness that nearly killed Augustus and Julia. Worried about her future Julia writes a letter to Agrippa (via Maecenas) begging him to return home. Meanwhile, Tiberius approaches Julia in the hope that he might finally have her for himself. However Augustus decides to marry her to Agrippa. Julia marries to Agrippa; and Tiberius to Agrippa's daughter Vipsania. The depression over not being able to marry Julia for a second time drives Tiberius to drink until he his confronted with it by Julia and Agrippa. He stops for the sake of his marriage to Vipsania.

Agrippa is deeply in love with Julia and has been since her marriage to Marcellus and to try and win favour with her he spoils her. However he is aware that she was in love with Tiberius and he with her. After a party where Tiberius attempts to seduce Julia, he begins to worry that the two will use Vipsania and himself as an excuse to see each other. Nonetheless, Julia chooses to go with Agrippa, rather than stay in Rome with Tiberius and Vipsania, when he leaves for a campaign in Gaul. Julia later discovers that Vipsania is in love with someone else, Gellus. She attempts to break them apart only to be blocked by Agrippa who says that she is only doing it to spite Vipsania.

After this, Julia decides to distance herself from Tiberius as much as possible by travelling with Agrippa around the empire. Along the way, the pair discover that Livia has many spies, and Julia advises Agrippa to reduce the influence of these spies to ensure that, in the event of Augustus falling ill and dying, they won't be run out by Livia's followers. The most notable is Salome, Herod the Great's sister. Agrippa and Julia advice Herod to reinstate his first wife Doris to reduce Salome's influence.

Livia realises this and attempts to get rid of Julia and her two sons by drowning them in a set-accident. However they are saved by Agrippa. Not long after this, Agrippa dies, and Julia's close ally and friend Maecenas, suggests that Livia had him poisoned. Julia becomes very depressed following Agrippa's death but tries to stay strong to ensure that her unborn child will be healthy. She gives birth to a little boy who is born feet first, like Agrippa was, and names him Marcus Vipsanius Agrippa Postumus in honour of his father.

Eventurally Julia and Tiberius marry and are happy until the death of their son, Nero. After the death Tiberius becomes paranoid that Julia will betray him. Following the death of his brother Drusus he begins to take out his sorrow and anger on her as well as taking to drink again. He begins treating her badly, on one occasion twisting her arm so hard he dislocates it. When Augustus asks about it Julia tries to lie but he quickly realises Tiberius is abusing her. Augustus is disgusted with this and Tiberius leaves. He leaves telling Julia that it is probably best for keeping both Augustus and Livia off his back.

The absence of Tiberius allows Julia to focus on her children and friends. She raises Agrippina and Postumus, as her elder children live with her father. She also raises Tiberius' only son Drusus. She also becomes fond of her cousin Antonia's son Claudius, who Postumus forges a friendship with due to their rejection by most other people.

Julia begins a close friendship with her cousin Julus, Mark Antony's son. He proves to be a good protector to her sons as well as someone to talk to. However he quickly confesses he wants them to be lover; she rejects him at first but eventually gives in although Julia disbelieves that Julus has love in his nature. However her father's servant (and Livia's spy) Crispus, who was at one time considered as a "safe" husband choice for Julia, suspects something. Julia is eventually arrested for trumped up charges of treason and is exiled. Her mother Scribonia chooses to go with her. She manages to sneak a letter from her children, written by Gaius, promising that once Augustus was dead they would bring both her and Scribonia back to Rome and charge Livia with the murder of their father, Agrippa.

However all her children meet tragic fates: her son Lucius is poisoned and Gaius murdered on a campaign; her daughter Julilla is also exiled on trumped up charges of adultery; and her youngest son Postumus exiled. Julia learns from Agrippina that Postumus had become depressed and violent as a result of losing his mother and he was exiled for hitting Livia after she confesses to having his mother exiled and his brothers murdered. While in exile Postumus comes to see the error of his ways and is allowed to write a letter to his mother, telling her that he is studying well and working to make her proud.

Meanwhile, in Rome Augustus forgives Postumus when he realises, with the help of Agrippina, what Livia has been doing and tries to call him back. After seeing the change in Postumus' character he decides that he will change his will to make him his heir, rather than Tiberius. However Augustus becomes ill and dies before he is able to call Postumus back. Realising that he might die before Postumus is saved Augustus plans to have Postumus secretly removed from exile and replaced by his slave Clitus. To ensure that the plots to make Postumus emperor and restore Julia to favour come to nothing, Livia has Postumus secretly murdered.

After hearing of the death of her last son Julia decides to kill herself. She confides to her mother that she intends to write down her story before she dies so that it can be passed on to her one surviving child, Agrippina. Before she dies, she realises that Tiberius has become corrupted by power like her father had and that it was Agrippa, not Tiberius, whom she truly loved; and that Agrippa and Scribonia are the only people that truly loved her.

== Characters ==
- Julia, the novel's protagonist and narrator. She is the daughter of Augustus and mother to his heirs.
- Tiberius, the stepbrother of Julia. He was in love with Julia during their childhood.
- Livia, the third wife of Augustus. She is the novel's antagonist who arranges the downfall of Julia, Agrippa and their children.
- Augustus, the emperor of Rome and Julia's father. He adores Julia but later exiles her for adultery.
- Marcus Agrippa, second husband of Julia and Augustus' most trusted general. He is the father of Julia's children.
- Gaius Maecenas, one of Augustus' most trusted friends.
- Terentia, Maecenas' wife and Augustus' favourite mistress.
- Octavia, the elder sister of Augustus and mother of Marcellus. She is one of the few people Julia truly loves.
- Marcellus, Julia's first husband and cousin.
- Horace, a poet beloved by Maecenas and Julia.
- Iullus Antonius, Julia's friend who keeps her informed of the news when she is out of Rome.
- Herod the Great, a good friend of Agrippa who appears to be smitten with Julia.
- Salome, sister of Herod the Great. One of Livia's spies.
- Crispus, right-hand man following the death of Maecenas. He tries to seduce Julia when attempting to have her exiled.
- Agrippa Postumus, Julia's youngest child with Agrippa.
- Gaius, Julia's eldest son who is Augustus' heir apparent.
- Lucius, Julia's second son.
- Juliola, (also called Julilla), Julia's eldest daughter. She is exiled for adultery.
- Agrippina, Julia's youngest daughter.
- Scribonia, the second wife of Augustus and mother of Julia.
- Nero Drusus, Julia's other stepbrother.
- Vipsania, Agrippa's eldest daughter by his first wife. She marries Tiberius, and eventually Gellus.
- Nero, Julia and Tiberius' son who dies young.
- Polla, Agrippa's younger sister who helped him raise Vipsania.
- Gellus, a young nobleman who is in love with Vipsania and she with him.
- Cornelia, Julia's elder sister who dies at the age of thirty the same year her brother becomes consul.
- Antonia, Julia's cousin, the daughter of Octavia.
- Claudius, the son of Antonia and Nero Drusus.

== Context ==
A majority of the story is based on a series of love-triangles between Julia, Tiberius and Agrippa. There are various other triangles including Julia, Tiberius and Iullus.

== See also ==
- Caesar's Daughter
