= Marthe Rakine =

Canadian artist (1904–1996)

- Born: November 20, 1904, Moscow, Russia
- Died: July 27, 1996 (aged 91)
- Education: École nationale supérieure des arts décoratifs, Paris
- Known for: painter
- Spouse: Boris Rakine

Marthe Rakine (November 20, 1904 – July 27, 1996) was a Canadian, later Swiss, painter who was born in the Russian Empire.

== Career ==
Rakine was born in Moscow to a Swiss father and French mother from Provence. The family moved to Paris when she was young, and she began her studies at the École nationale supérieure des arts décoratifs in that city in 1926. She also took lessons at the Sorbonne and with Othon Friesz at the Académie de la Grande Chaumière in the mid-1930s. She married the painter Boris Rakine, with whom she lived outside of Paris and with whom she emigrated to Canada in 1948. She next enrolled at the Ontario College of Art, taking ceramics and studying there from 1949 to 1950. She exhibited widely in Canada and abroad, both in solo and in group shows. In 1952, Rakine was invited to participate in the Canadian section of the Pittsburgh International Exhibition. Another of her shows was at the Montreal Museum of Fine Arts in 1954: she exhibited her work along with Jean-Paul Jerome. Two of her paintings are in the National Gallery of Canada; other examples of her work may be seen at the Art Gallery of Ontario, the Art Gallery of Hamilton, the Montreal Museum of Fine Arts, the Agnes Etherington Art Centre, and the Art Gallery of Northumberland.

Rakine and her husband left Canada in 1958, taking up residence in Lausanne.

About her work, she said:

"I think it is quite important that a painter paint with love."
