= Heini Waser =

Swiss painter (1913–2008)

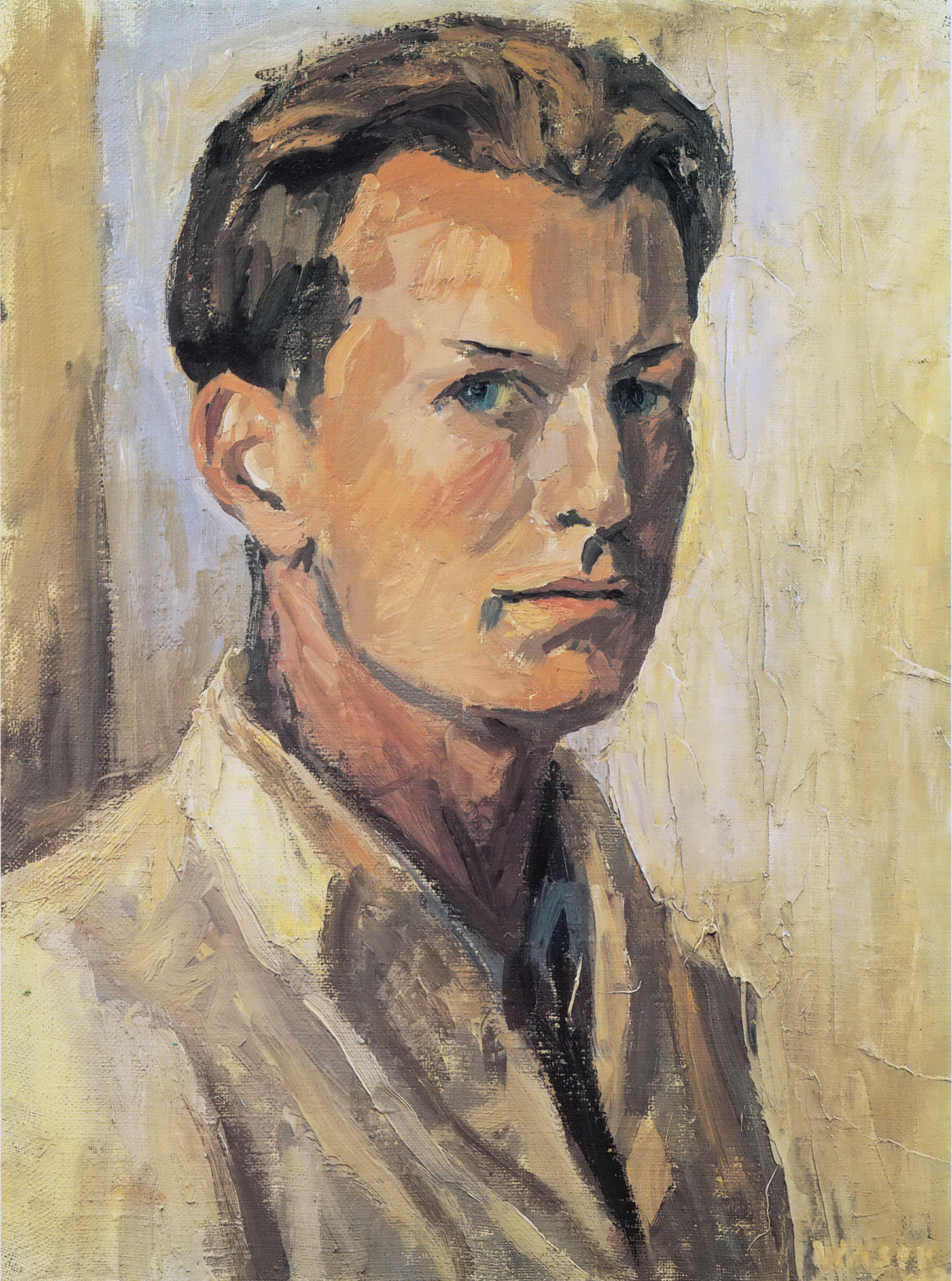
- Self-portrait, 1943
- Born: Urs Heinrich Otto Waser; 3 September 1913; Zürich, Switzerland
- Died: 13 June 2008 (aged 94); Zollikon, Switzerland
- Education: Académie Scandinave; Académie Colarossi; Othon Friesz
- Known for: Landscape and portrait painting
- Movement: Post-Impressionism
- Website: https://heiniwaser.ch/

Signature
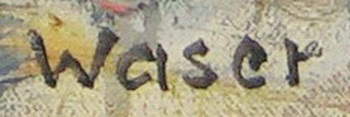

Urs Heinrich Otto Waser (3 September 1913 – 13 June 2008), who called himself Heini Waser, was a Swiss painter of Post-Impressionist landscapes.

== Biography ==
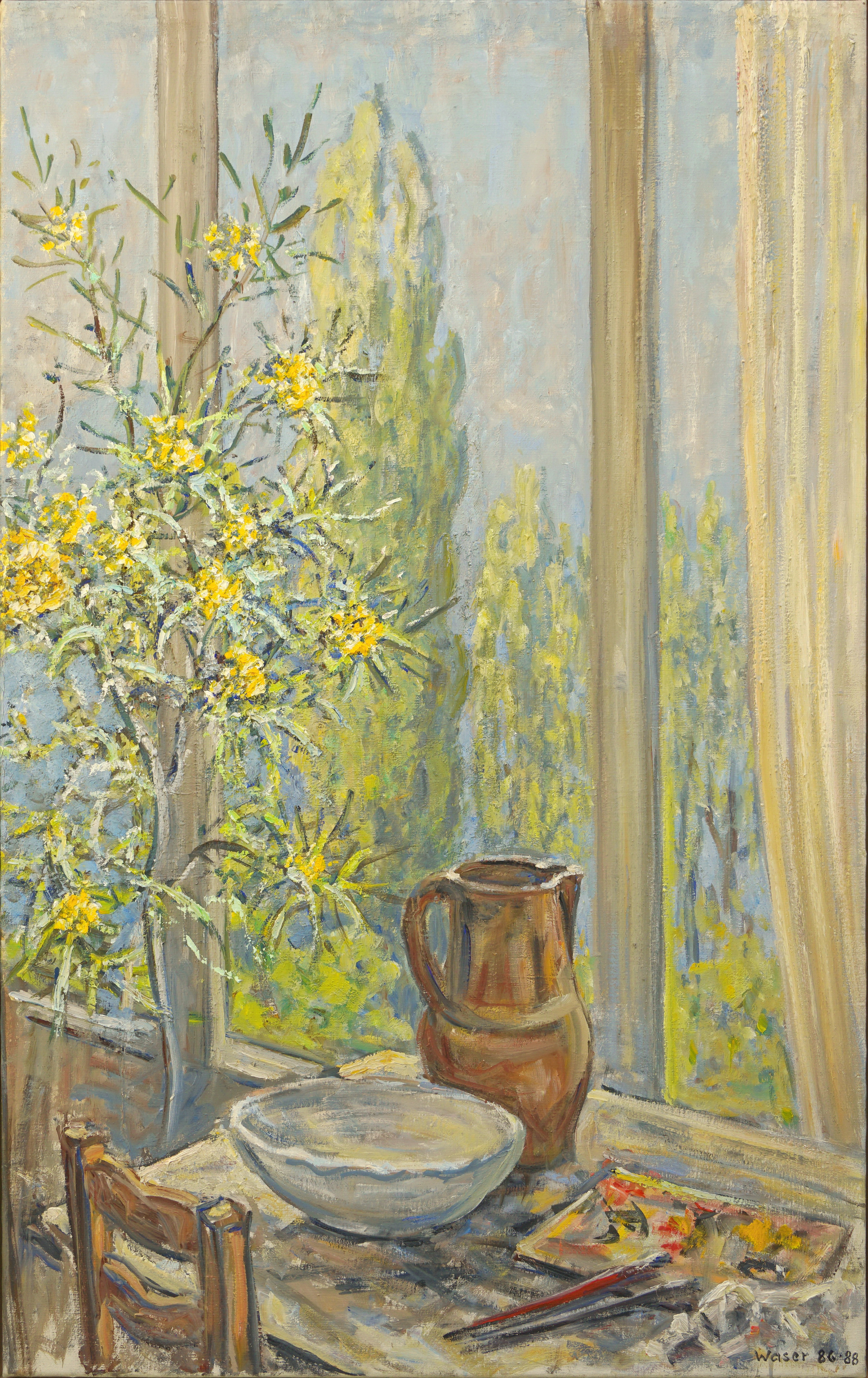
The Mimosa Tree in the Studio, Zollikon 1986–1988

Waser was born in Zürich, Switzerland, the son of the classical archaeologist Otto Waser and the writer Maria Waser. Among his ancestors was the painter Anna Waser.

After studying art and music history for two semesters at the University of Zurich, Waser decided, on the advice of Cuno Amiet, to train as a painter in Paris. From 1933 to 1936 he took classes at the Académie Scandinave and the Académie Colarossi with Othon Friesz, Marcel Gromaire and Henry de Waroquier. During this time he studied paintings in the Louvre, and was particularly impressed with the works of Chardin, Corot and Cézanne. Between 1937 and 1939 he continued his studies in Florence.

From 1937 onwards, Waser painted in his studio in Zollikon, where he had grown up. In 1938 he married the pianist Elsa Nägeli. Their son was born in 1939, their daughter in 1949. During World War II, Waser served as a corporal in the Swiss army.

From 1948 onwards, Waser regularly exhibited his works in a Zurich gallery, and in 1949 he was awarded a Federal Art Scholarship. He also began to travel to southern Europe, beginning in Provence in 1948, and spending time painting in Mediterranean countries almost every year.

In 1957 his work was shown at the Kunsthaus Zürich along with three other artists. From 1962 to 1968 Waser was president of the Zurich section of the Society of Swiss Painters, Sculptors and Architects, and in 1982 he was made an honorary member. From 1970 to 1982 he was on the board of the Zürcher Kunstgesellschaft, the sponsoring association of the Kunsthaus.

He lived to the age of 94 and painted until shortly before his death.

Waser was described as a kind, modest and empathetic person. As a painter, he worked at the service of his subjects.

== Work ==
Waser mainly painted in oils on canvas and in watercolours; he also drew, created lithographs, woodcuts and wall-paintings.

Works by Waser are owned by the Swiss Confederation, the Canton of Zürich, the City of Zürich and the Municipality of Zollikon, among others.

=== Subjects ===
Besides still lifes and portraits, Waser painted landscapes, which became his main interest: Mediterranean landscapes (most frequently in Provence and from 1972 onwards in Mallorca; also in Greece, Spain and Ischia), Alpine landscapes (especially in Lenzerheide, where he painted almost every year from 1942 onwards), the surroundings of his home in Zollikon on Lake Zurich, and the Oberaargau region in the canton of Bern, where his mother came from.

Nature was the most important source of inspiration for Waser's work. He painted his impressions of a landscape while at the same time, he expressed his feelings, and sought to unite everything in his work. Waser himself wrote on this subject: "When the painter is lucky enough to see his mood reflected in nature – be it gloomy, cheerful, dreamy, high-spirited – in such a way that his inner problems find an answer in the outer, visible world, then the spark ignites. The desire to paint becomes a need to paint."

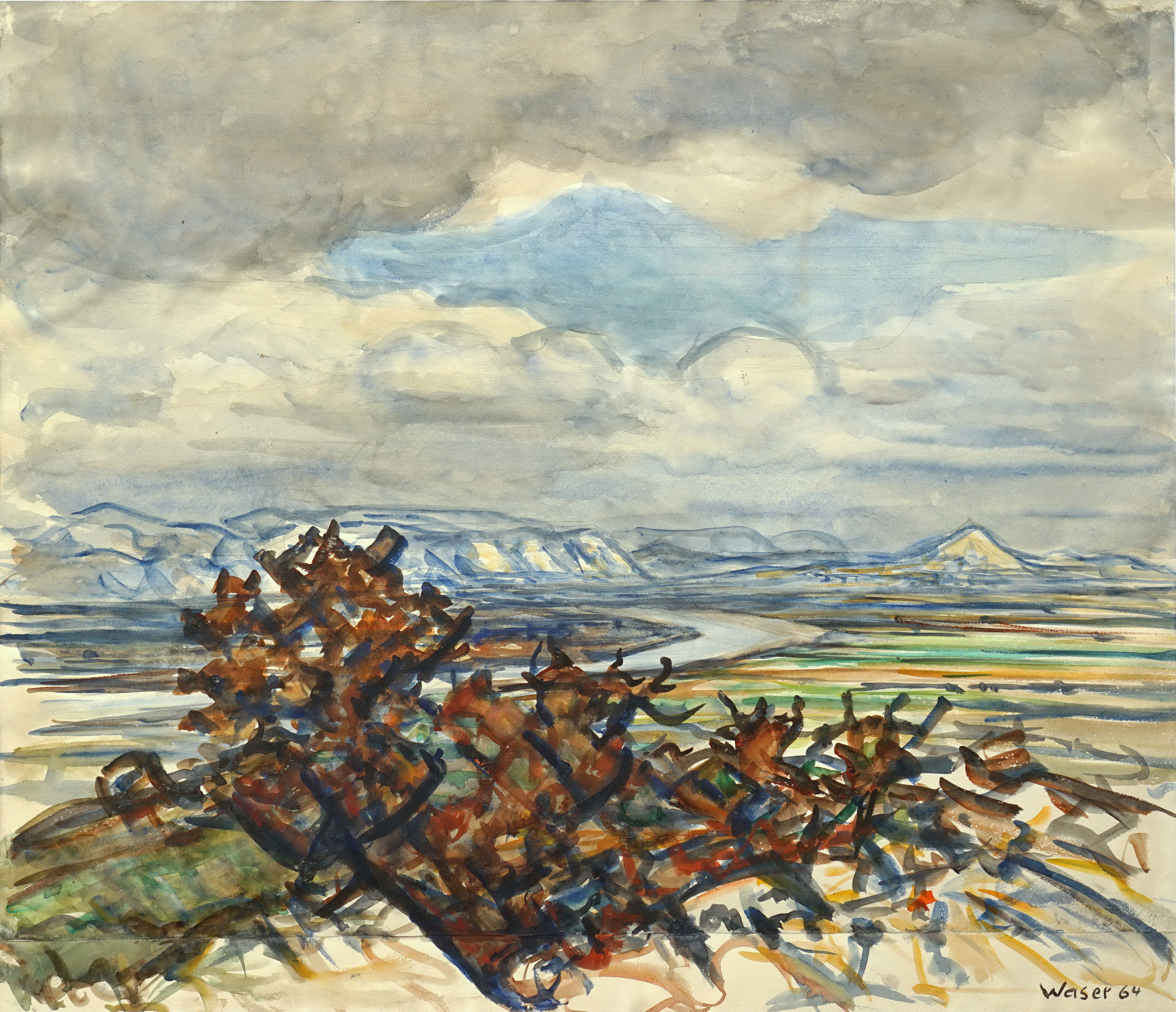
The Rhône in Provence, 1964

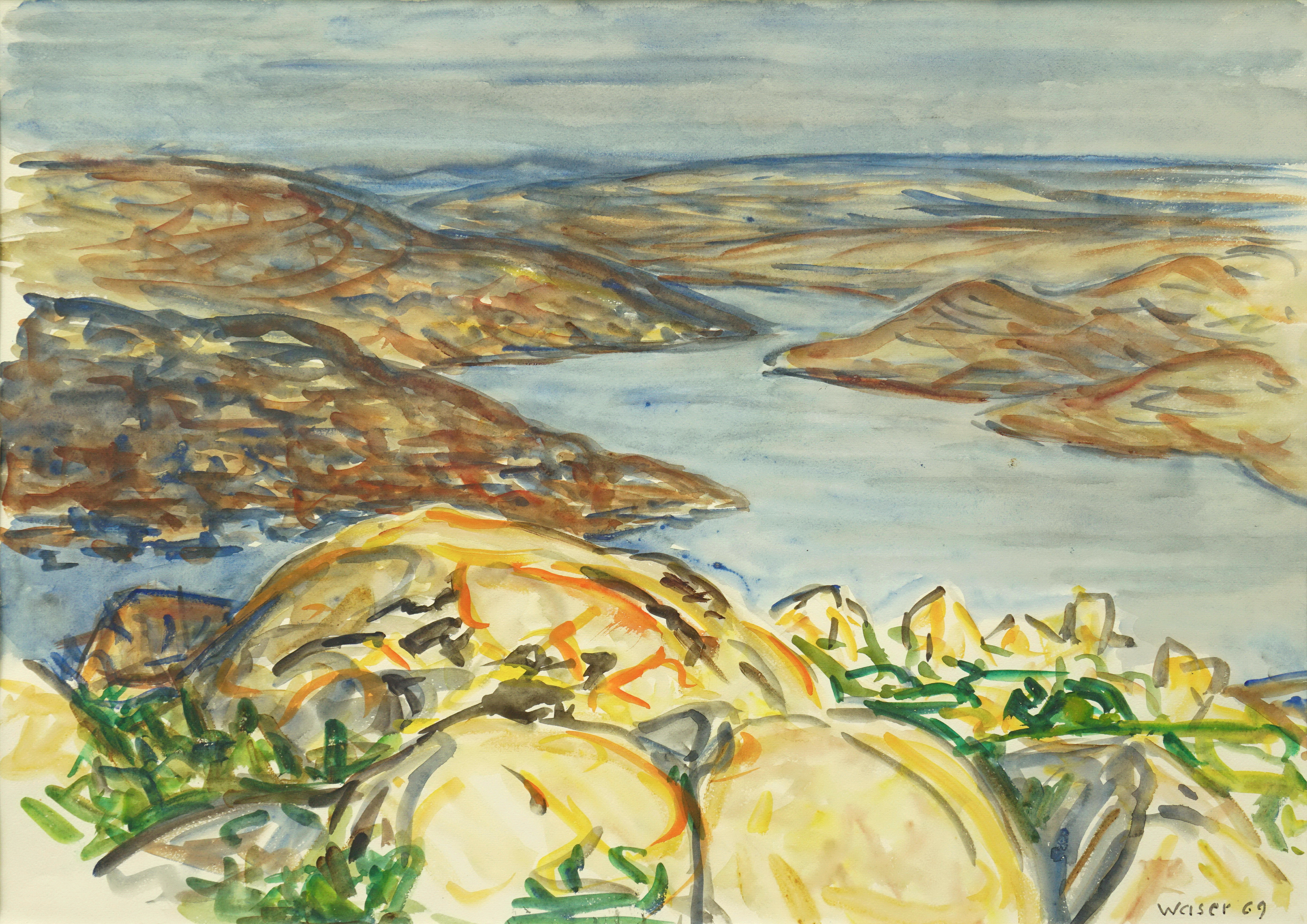
Spain: The Guadiana River in Castile, 1969

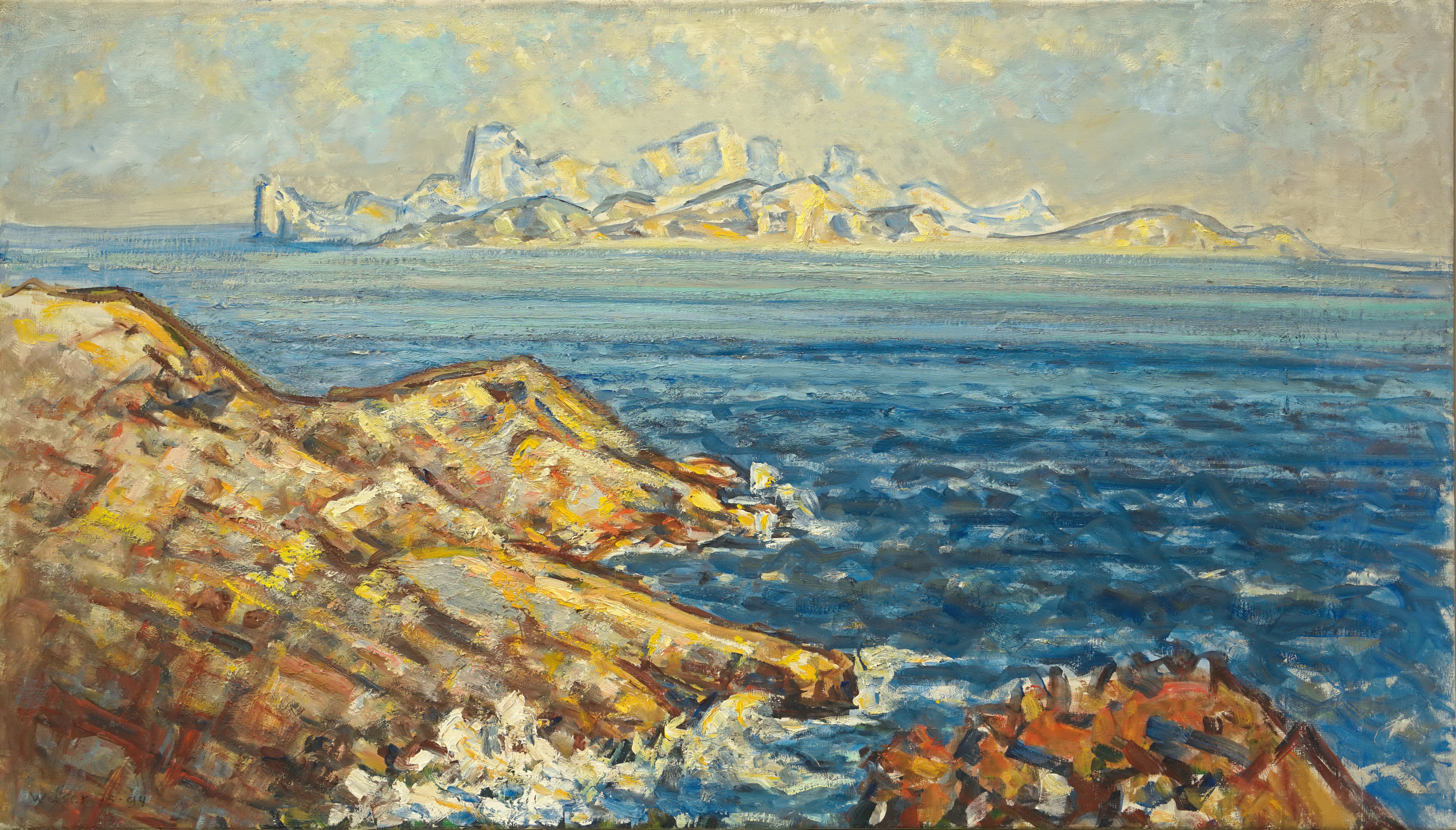
Provence: Islands near Marseille (l'archipel de Riou), 1975–1994

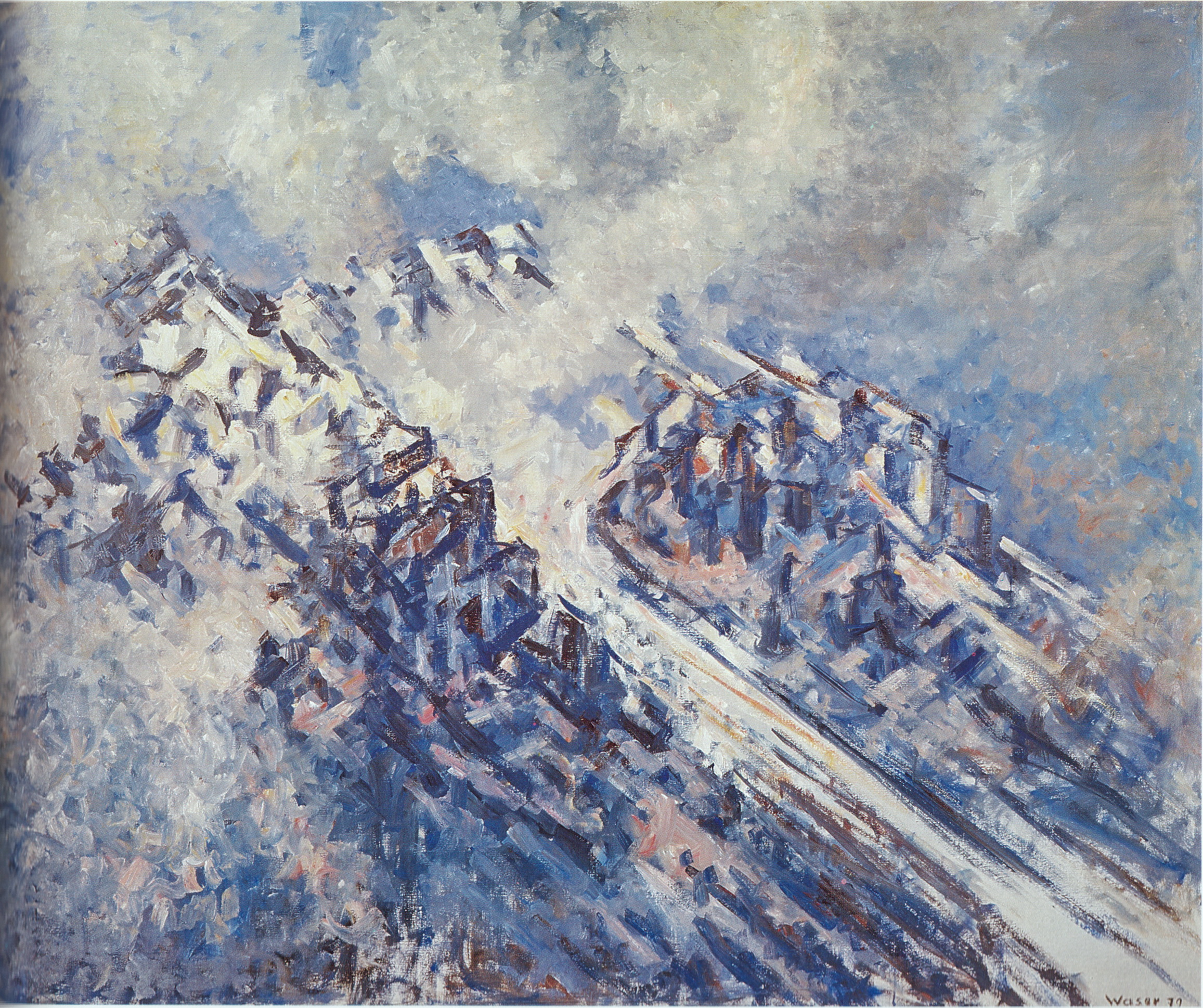
Lenzerheide: Mountain in Clouds (Lenzerhorn), 1979

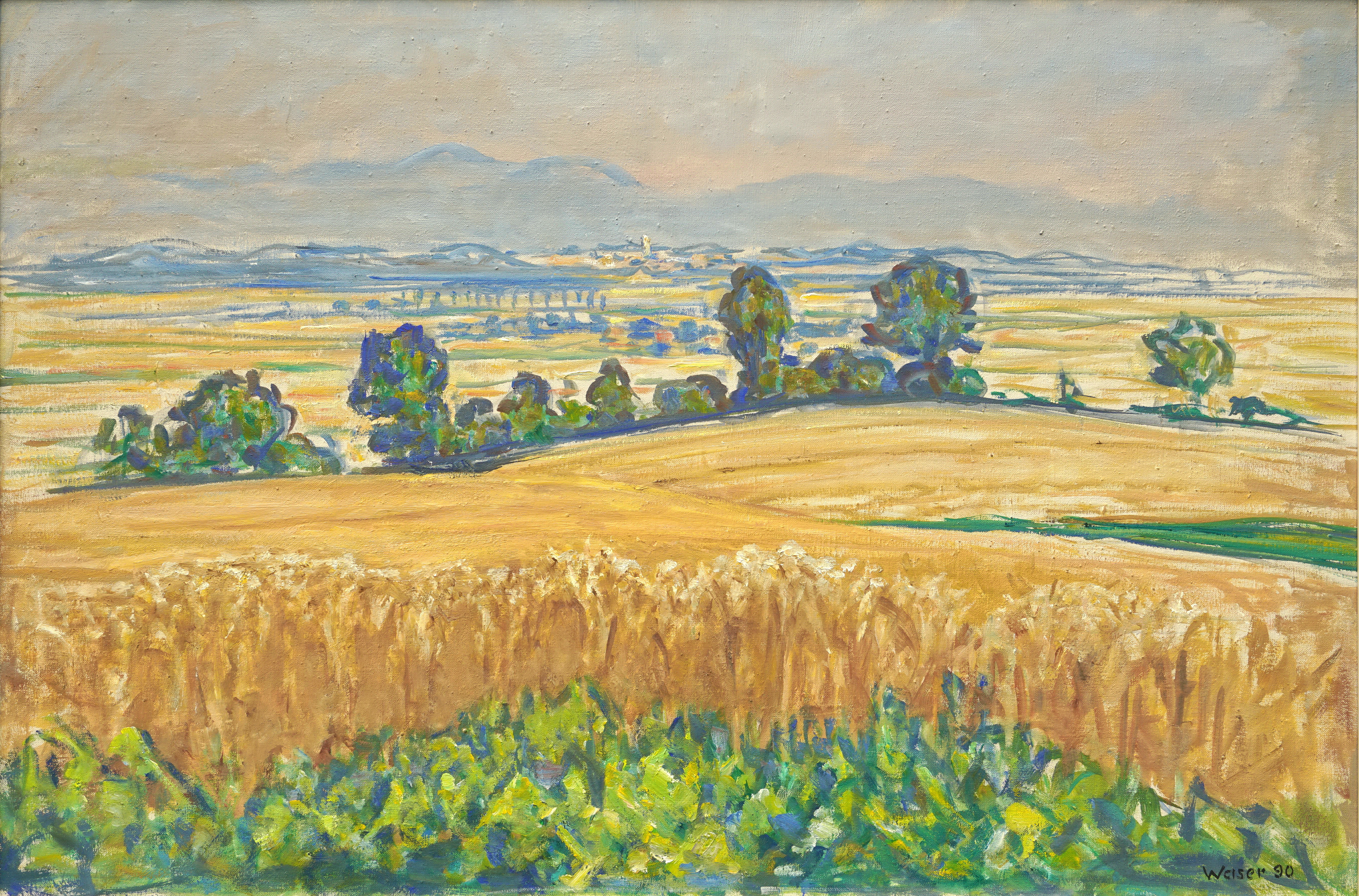
Oberaargau: On Krähberg (near Aeschi), 1990

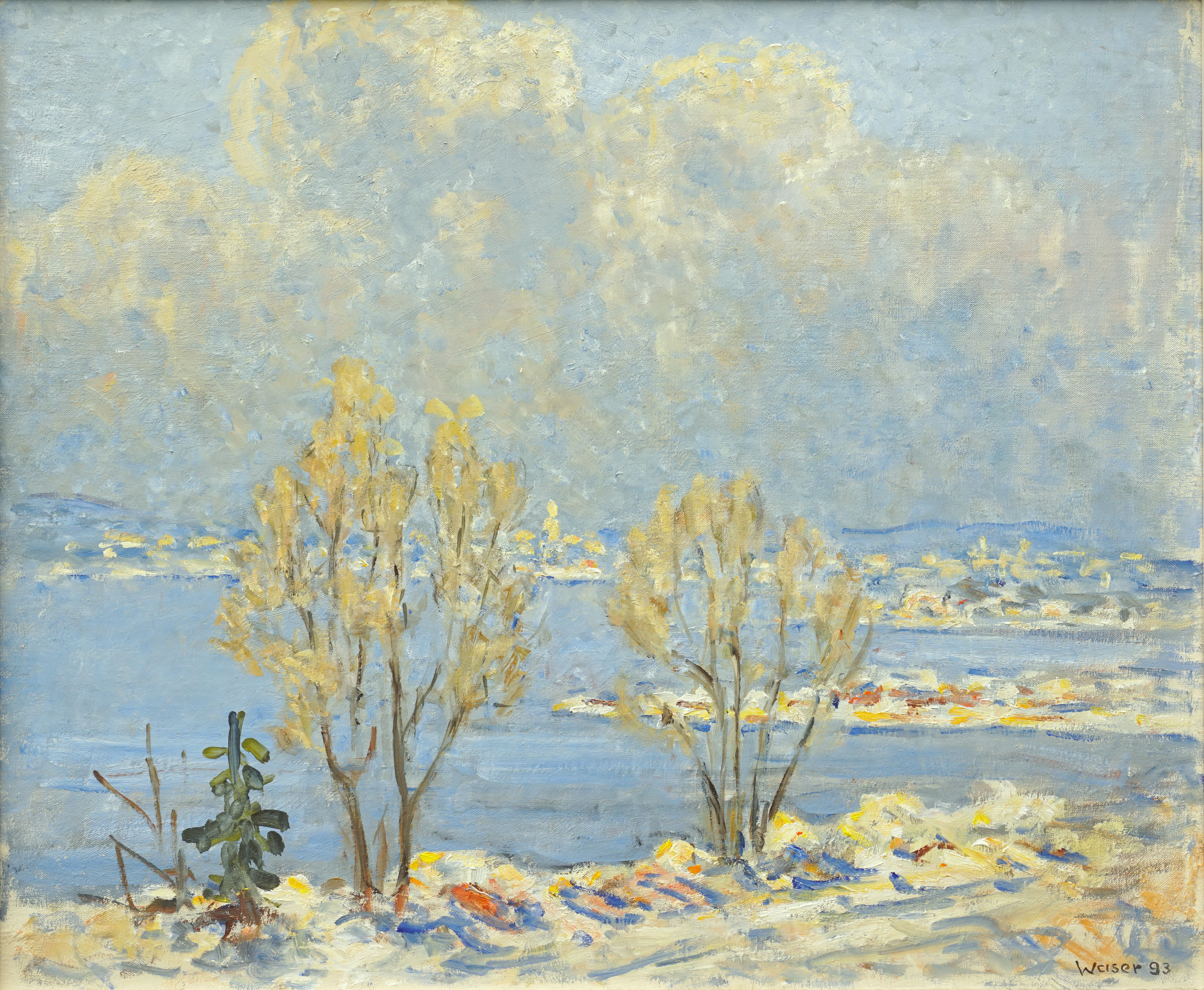
Lake Zurich: Winter Clouds over the City (Zürich, from Zollikon), 1993

=== Composition and style ===
Waser often chose an elevated viewpoint for his landscapes. He sought to gain an overall impression of a scenery's elements, those nearby and those far away, in order to grasp the complex whole in his work and make connections visible. As a unifying device, he sometimes used corresponding shapes in the foreground and in the background (e.g. a piece of rock and a mountain, or a tree and a cloud).

Throughout his life he had a consistent style, which had been influenced in Paris by the art movements of Impressionism, Post-Impressionism and Fauvism. He regarded the changing art fashions of his time with reservation. A development can be seen in his work "from the dark and compact to the light and from the lyrical to the epic and open". His paintings increasingly convey a sense of "light-filled serenity".

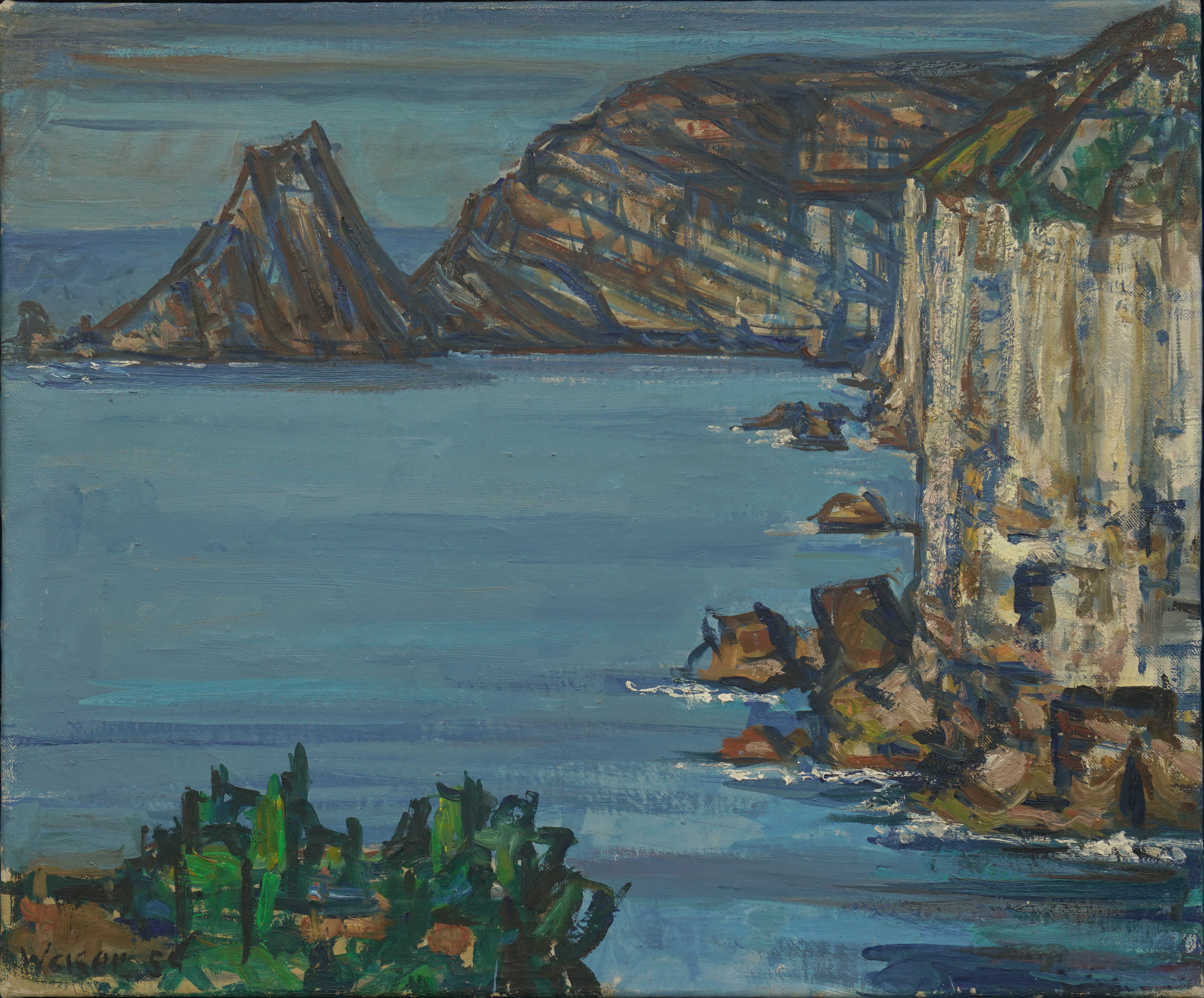
1954: Ischia
(49 × 59 cm)

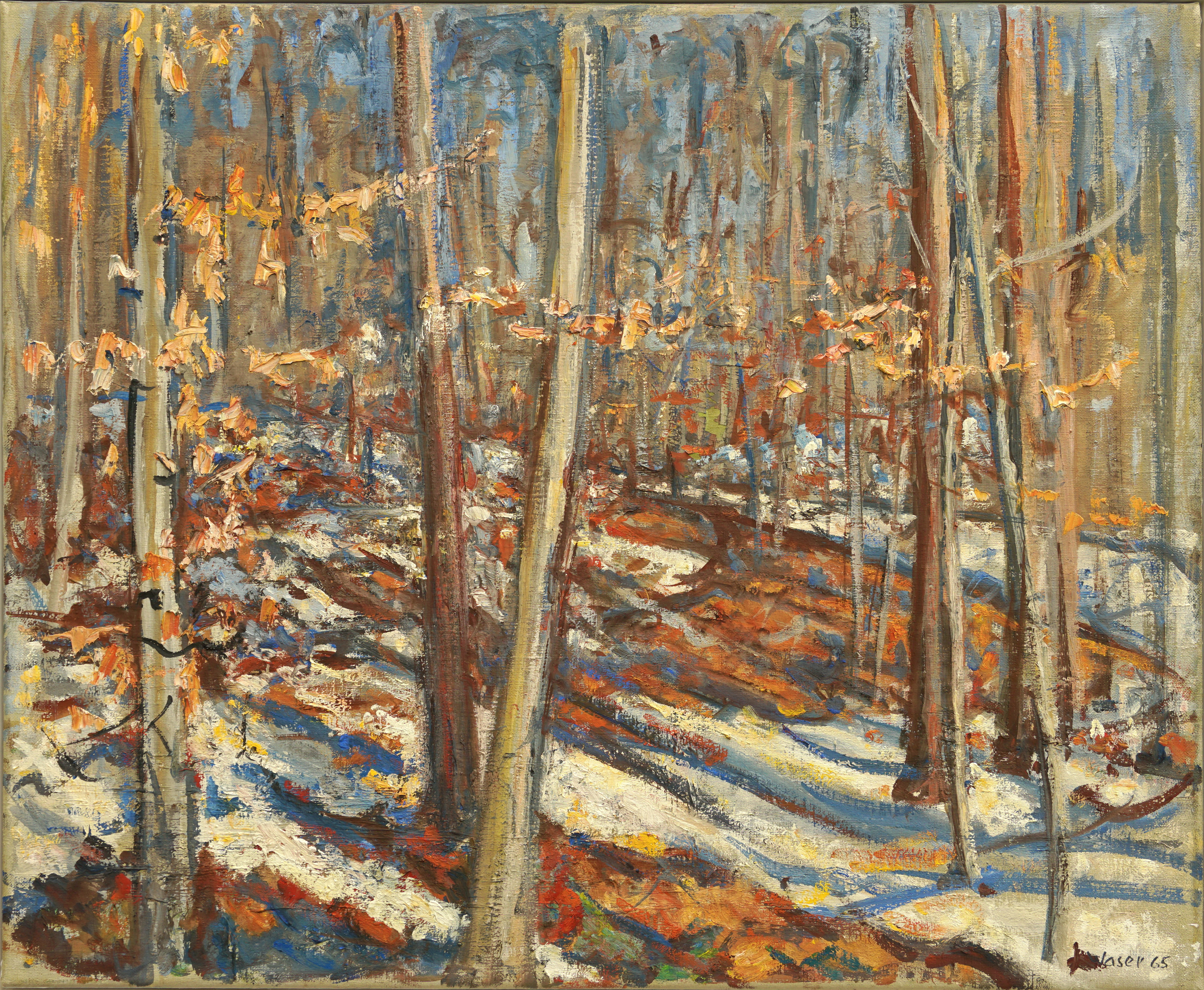
1965: Forest in winter, near Zollikon
(60 × 73 cm)

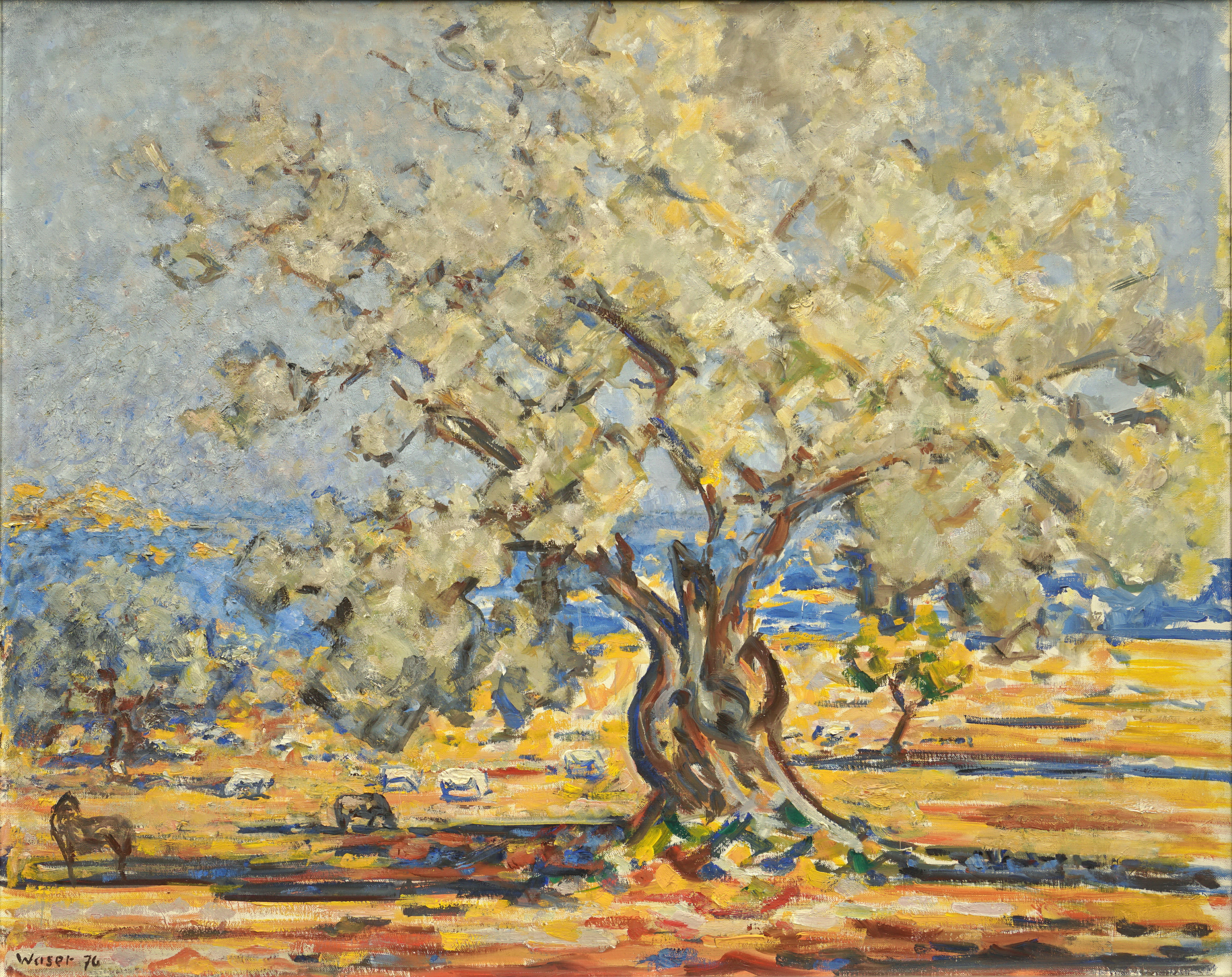
1976: Old Olive Tree, Mallorca (73 × 92 cm)

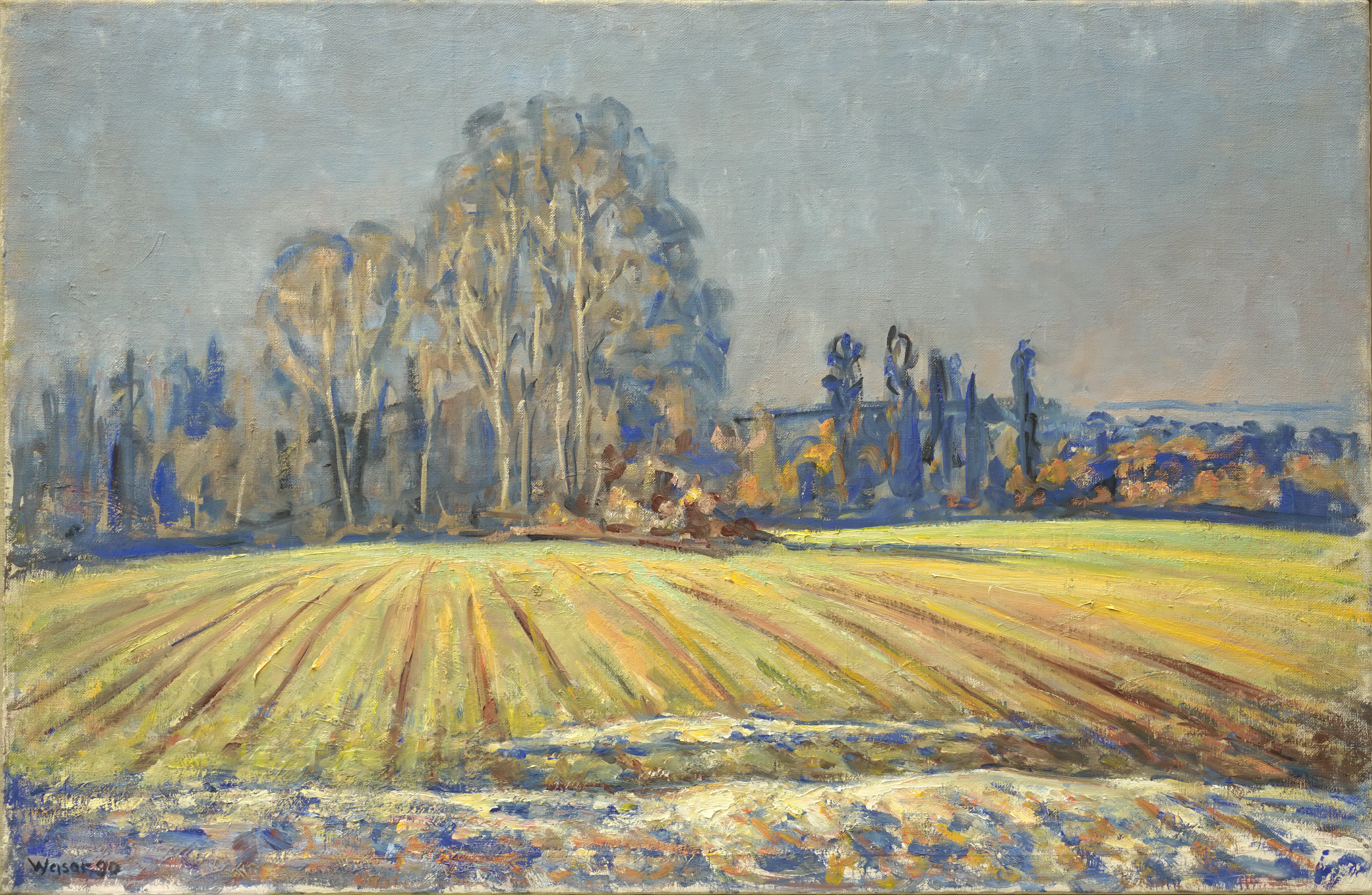
1990: Young Crop, Last Snow, Pfannenstiel
(60 × 92 cm)
