= Hannes Sköld =

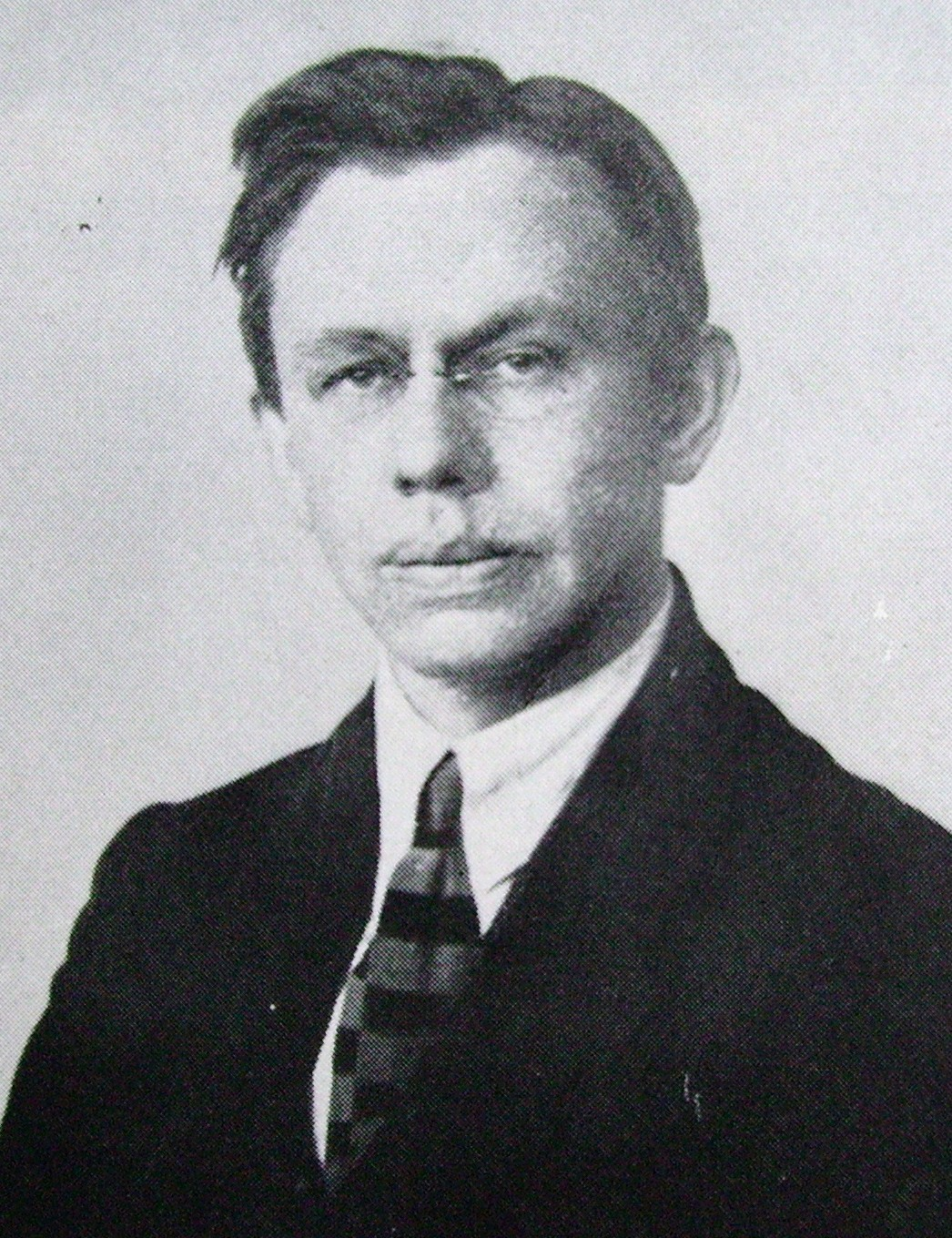
- Hannes Sköld
- Born: Johannes Evelinus Sköld; 20 September 1886; Heby, Sweden
- Died: 14 September 1930 (aged 43); Höör, Sweden
- Occupations: Socialist, linguist, teacher, writer, poet, songwriter

Johannes Evelinus "Hannes" Sköld (20 September 1886 – 14 September 1930) was a Swedish socialist and anti-militarist. Sköld was also a linguist, teacher, writer, poet, and songwriter.

== Biography ==
Johannes Sköld was born in Heby. Large parts of his childhood was spent in China, as his father Johan Sköld (missionary) worked as a missionary. His brother was Otte Sköld, noted painter. His family returned to Sweden in 1897 and settled in the city of Norrköping, where he became friends with Ture Nerman. After Gymnasia high school he moved to Gothenburg to study at the University of Gothenburg. In Gothenburg, Hannes Sköld got to know Zeth Höglund and became active with him in the left wing of the workers' movement.

As a young bohemian, Hannes Sköld traveled around Europe and lived in Paris and Copenhagen while working as a correspondent for different Swedish newspapers. He published his first book of poetry in 1911. The same year, he was jailed in Långholmen prison for spreading anti-militarist propaganda. In 1912, he released his second book, which he had written while in prison.

Sköld became a communist in 1917 after the Russian Revolution. He moved to the Soviet Union, learned Russian and translated some of the works by prominent Bolshevik leaders to Swedish. He also translated works by Karl Marx and August Bebel.

Sköld died on 14 September 1930, in Höör, aged 44.
