= John Börjeson =

Swedish sculptor

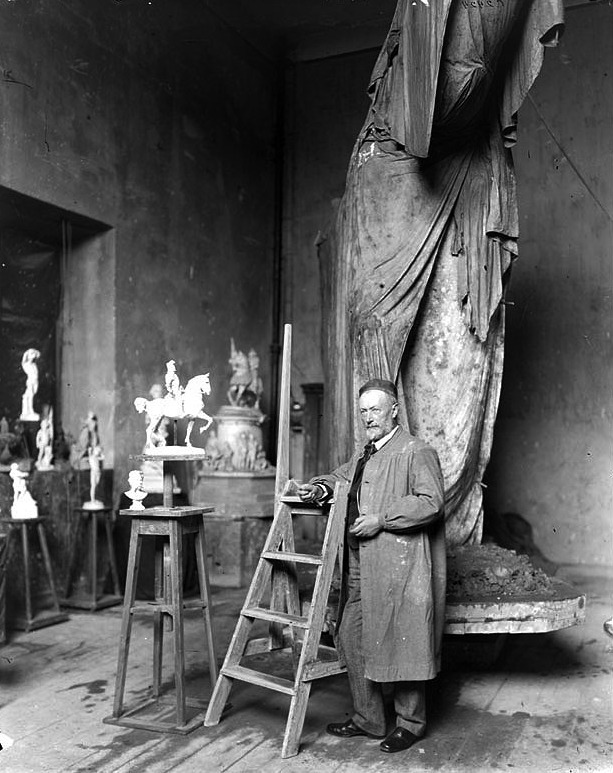
- John Börjeson in his studio in Stockholm 1901
- Born: Johan Laurentius Helenus Börjeson; 30 December 1835; Tölö socken, Kungsbacka, Sweden
- Died: 29 January 1910; Nacka, Stockholm, Sweden
- Occupation(s): Sculptor, teacher
- Spouse: Louise Frederikke Anna-Mathea (Vitté) Bartholin
- Children: 5, including Lena Börjeson

Johan Laurentius Helenus Börjeson (30 December 1835 – 29 January 1910) was a Swedish sculptor and teacher. Börjeson studied in Rome and Paris. He was a professor at Royal Swedish Academy of Arts in Stockholm 1886–1907.

His daughter was sculptor and teacher, Lena Börjeson.

== Gallery ==
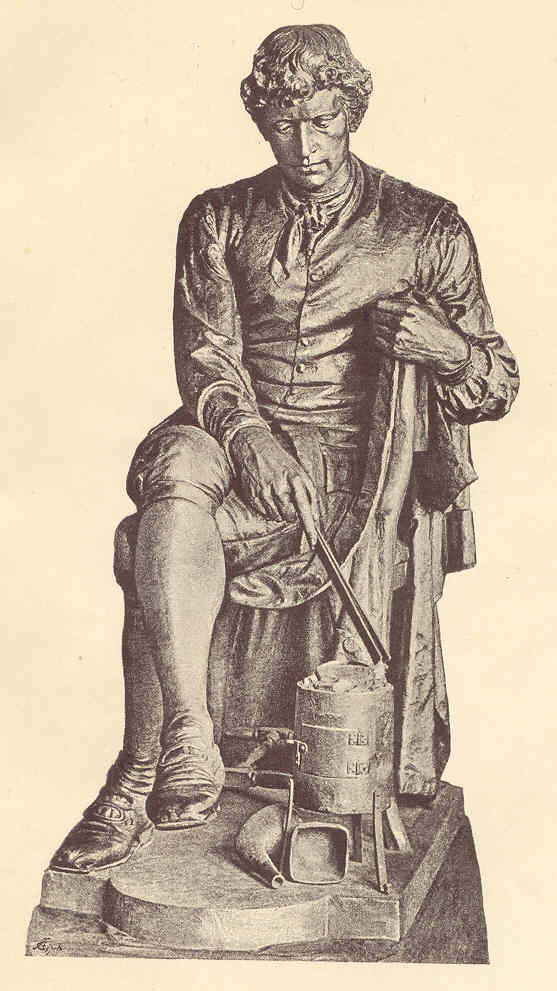
Carl Wilhelm Scheele (1892) in Humlegården, Stockholm.

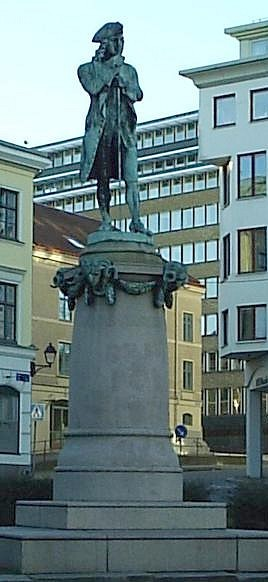
Jonas Alströmer in Gothenburg.

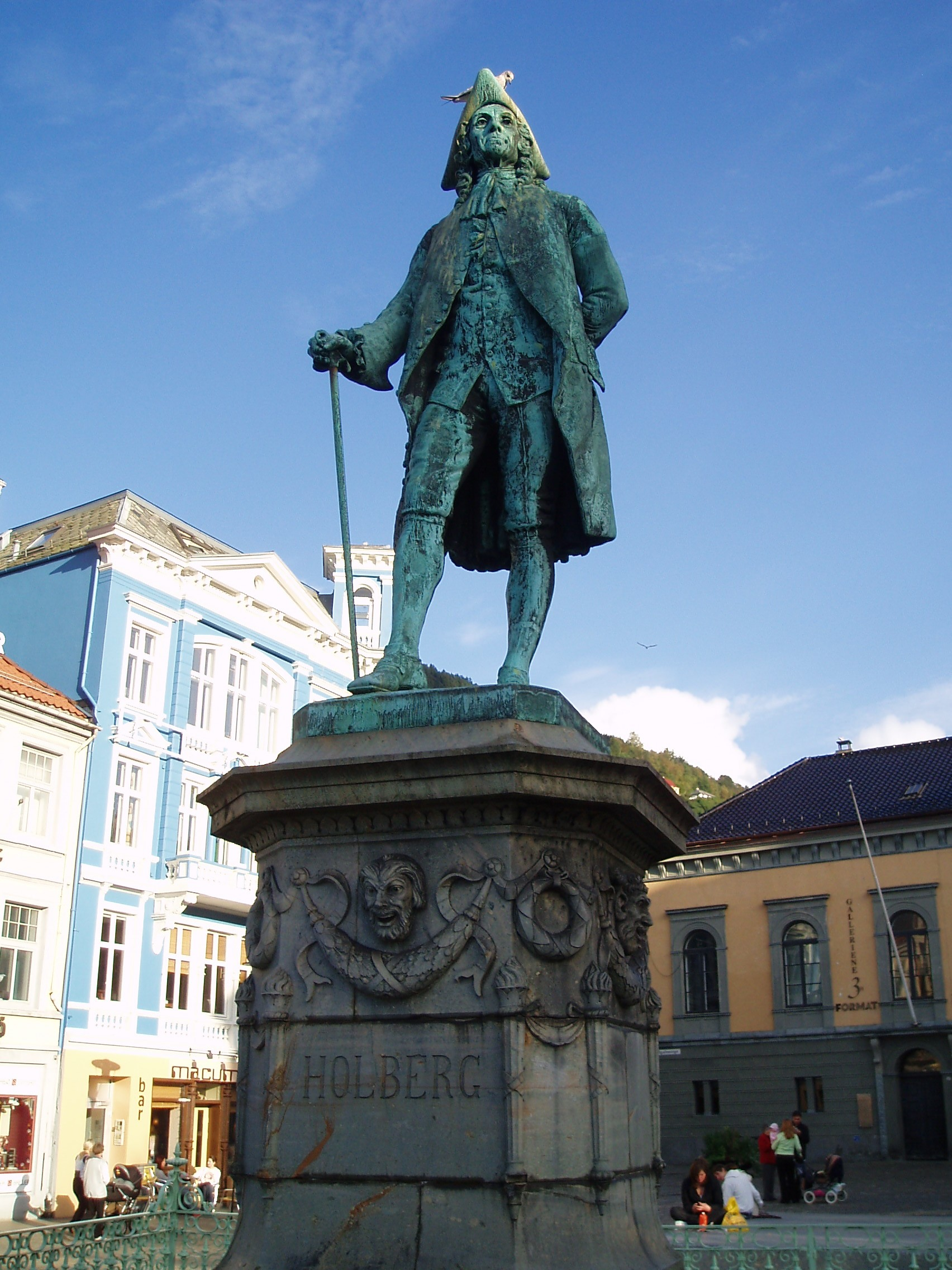
Ludvig Holberg in Bergen, Norway.
