= Ivan Lönnberg =

Swedish painter, runner, war veteran (1891–1918)

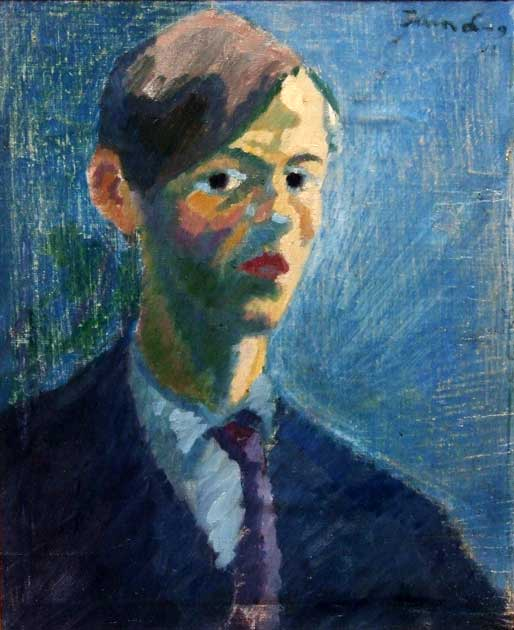
- Self-portrait in blue
- Born: 12 November 1891; Stockholm, Sweden
- Died: 26 April 1918 (aged 26); Cachy, Hauts-de-France, France
- Occupations: Modernist painter, marathon runner, war veteran
- Partner: Lena Börjeson (1917–1918)

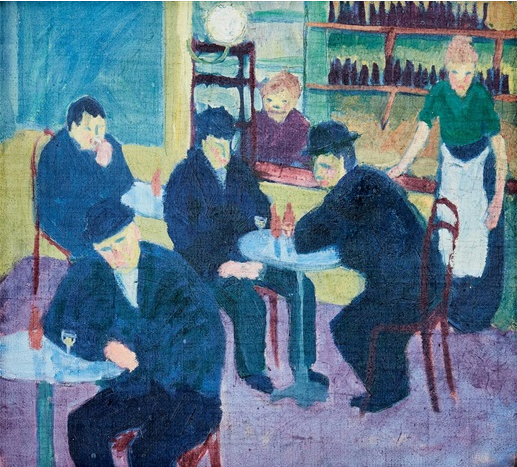
Café Interior in Stockholm (1912)

Ivan Lönnberg (12 November 1891, Stockholm – 26 April 1918, Cachy) was a Swedish modernist painter, marathon runner, and war veteran. In style he was close to the Swedish painters of his generation known as "De Unga" ("The Young") which included Isaac Grünewald and Birger Simonsson.

== Life and career ==
He studied art at a private school operated by Carl Wilhelmson. In 1912, he held an exhibition in Stockholm with two of his friends, Bertil Norén and Carl Herman Runnström.

He came to Paris in January 1914, where he became a part of a circle of Swedish painters on Montparnasse including Grünewald, Einar Jolin, and Eric Detthow. His also made friends with Nils Dardel and Nils Santesson.

After World War I broke out, he joined the French Foreign Legion. While serving in Paris, he met artist Lena Börjeson and they started dating. He was mortally wounded by a shot in his left eye at the Western Front in 1918, the year the war ended.

Lönnberg was also a long-distance runner. He was part of Sweden's marathon team at the 1912 Summer Olympics, but he and five of his teammates were unable to complete the race, due to being made ill by the intense summer heat.

His production was quite small. Roughly 50 works are known, including those from art school and several self-portraits. Most of his paintings are at the Moderna museet in Stockholm. In a memorial exhibition in 1942, 48 of his works were shown. There are several portraits of him made by his artist friends, such as Dardel.
