= Signe Barth =

Swedish painter and educator (1895–1982)

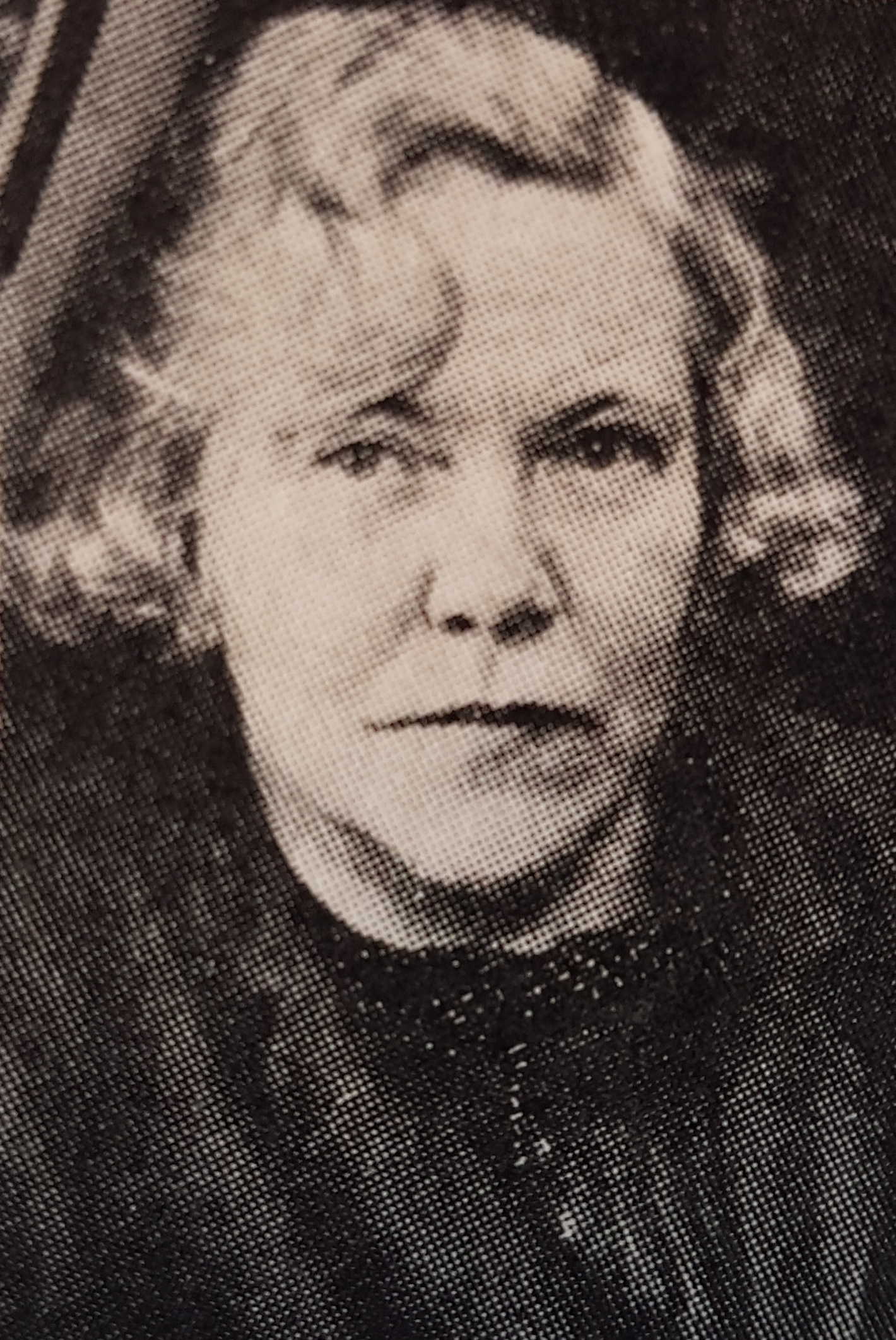
- Born: June 16, 1895; Uddevalla
- Died: March 15, 1982 (aged 86); Stockholm
- Education: Académie Scandinave
- Occupation: Painter

Signe Magdalena Barth née Pettersson (16 June 1895, Uddevalla — 15 March 1982, Stockholm) was a Swedish painter and art teacher. After studying in Stockholm and Copenhagen, she moved to Paris in 1920 where she completed her education, married and settled until 1936. After returning to Sweden, she ran an art college in Stockholm from 1940 to 1959. Her paintings include motifs in oils from Paris and Stockholm as well as landscapes from the west coast of Sweden.

== Early life and education ==
Born in Uddevalla on 16 June 1895, Signe Magdalena Pettersson was the daughter of the high-ranking government official Fredrik Emil Pettersson (1892–1907) and his wife Vendela Kristina von Essen (1853–1919). She was the family's youngest child. Raised on the Emaus estate near Uddevalla, she went on to study painting at Carl Wilhelmson's art college in Stockholm and then at Ernst Goldschmidt's school in Copenhagen. She completed her education in 1920 under André Lhote at the Académie Scandinave in Paris.

== Career ==
After moving to Paris, she met the Swiss artist Ernst Amadeus (Amadé) Barth. They married in 1922 but he died of tuberculosis in 1926. Her father tried to persuade her to return to Sweden but despite facing serious financial difficulties she decided to remain in Paris where she was free to study and paint. Every year she spent the summer on the west coast island of Tjörn where she had a studio in the family's summer residence.

Her paintings, often revealing the influence of Césanne, include cityscapes of Paris and Stockholm and landscapes of the Swedish west coast. For over 20 years, she served on the board of the Swedish Artists Union. Following a 1928 solo exhibition in Paris, Barth exhibited in Swedish galleries throughout her life. Her works are in the collections of Stockholm's Moderna Museet as well as in regional museums such as those in Borås, Östersund and Kalmar.

From 1940 to 1959, Barth taught painting for beginners in her school in Stockholm known as Signe Barths Målarskola. Her students included the painter Elsa Björk-Liselius and the photographer Gun Kessle.

Signe Barth died in Stockholm on 15 March 1982 aged 86.
