= Henry de Waroquier =

French visual artist (1881–1970)

- Born: Louis Henri Alphonse de Waroquier; 8 January 1881; Paris, France
- Died: 31 December 1970 (aged 89); Paris, France
- Burial place: Père Lachaise Cemetery
- Other names: Henri de Waroquier, Henri DeWaroquier
- Education: École nationale supérieure des arts décoratifs
- Occupations: Painter, sculptor, designer, engraver, teacher
- Known for: Landscape painting
- Movement: Orientalism
- Awards: Commander of the Legion of Honour (1950), Officer of the Legion of Honour (1937), Commander of the Order of Arts and Letters; Knight of the Legion of Honour (1926)

Henry de Waroquier (né Louis Henri Alphonse de Waroquier; 8 January 1881 – 31 December 1970) was a French painter, sculptor, designer, engraver, and teacher. He is associated with the School of Paris.

He attended the École nationale supérieure des arts décoratifs, under Charles Genuys.

De Waroquier was a teacher of decorative composition at the École Estienne, and of painting at the Académie Scandinave in Paris. Noted students which worked under him included Inés Puyó, Heini Waser, and Maria Helena Vieira da Silva.

He was Commandeur de la Légion d'honneur (1950), and Commandeur de l'Ordre des Arts et des Lettres.

De Waroquier died on December 31, 1970, in Paris, and is buried at Père Lachaise Cemetery. His work is found in many public museum collections, including Musée d'Orsay, Paris; Royal Museums of Fine Arts of Belgium, Brussels; and Musée Laurier, Victoriaville, Quebec, Canada.
