= Otte Sköld =

Swedish visual artist (1894–1958)

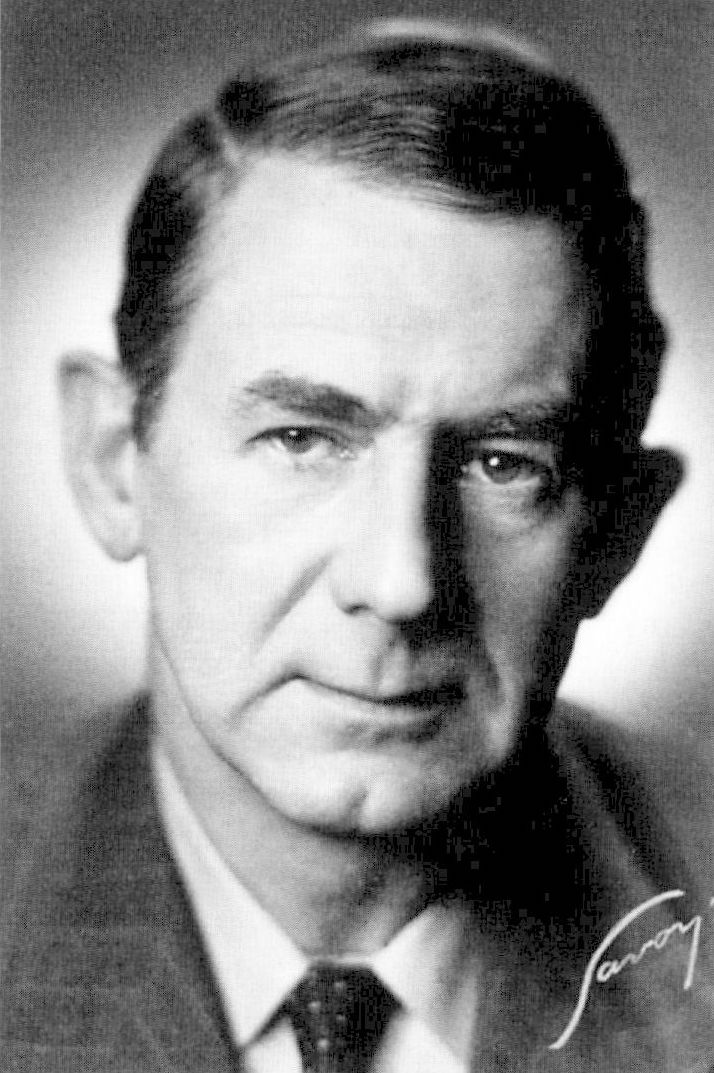
- Born: Joseph Adolf Johannes Sköld; 14 July 1894; Wuchang, Wuhan, Hubei Province, China
- Died: 7 November 1958 (aged 64); Hägersten, Stockholm, Sweden
- Burial place: Ekerö Cemetery, Ekerö Municipality, Sweden
- Other name: Otte Skold
- Education: Althin's School of Painting, Technical School
- Occupations: Painter, draftsman, graphic artist, teacher, curator, scenographer, mosaicist
- Spouse: Anna Arntz (m. 1917–)

Joseph Adolf Johannes Sköld (14 July 1894 – 7 November 1958), commonly known as Otte Sköld, was a Swedish painter, mosaicist, scenographer, draftsman, graphic artist, and teacher. He taught at the Académie Moderne and Académie Scandinave both in Montparnasse, Paris, and later ran his own painting school in Stockholm. Sköld worked as the director of the Nationalmuseum in Stockholm, and was involved with the founding of the Moderna Museet.

== Early life and education ==
Otte Sköld was born as Joseph Adolf Johannes Sköld on 14 July 1894, in Wuchang, China. His parents, Eva Charlotta Eriksdotter and Johan Sköld, were missionaries. His brother was Hannes Sköld, a noted linguist and Socialist. His early schooling was in China, and at the age of thirteen his family moved to Sweden.

He attended Althin's School of Painting, the Carl Wilhelmson painting school, and the Technical School in Stockholm (now Konstfack).

== Career ==
In 1926, he taught at the Académie Moderne, and at the newly opened Académie Scandinave; both schools were in Montparnasse, Paris. The following year in 1927, he opened his own painting school, Otte Skölds Art School (Swedish: Otte Skölds målarskola, lit. 'Otte Skölds Art School') in Stockholm (now Pernby School of Painting). He was a professor at the Royal Swedish Academy of Fine Arts from 1938 until 1942, and served as director from 1941 until 1950.

Sköld was a superintendent and director of the Nationalmuseum in Stockholm from 1950 until 1958. He was involved with the founding development of the Moderna Museet, which opened in 1958.

Sköld died on 7 November 1958, in the district of Hägersten in Stockholm, Sweden, and is buried in the cemetery at Ekerö Church.

His work can be found in museum collections, including the Finnish National Gallery, the National Museum of Norway, the Nationalmuseum in Stockholm, Ostergotlands Museum in Linköping, Sweden, Norrköping Art Museum in Norrköping, Sweden, the Perlman Teaching Museum at Carleton University, and the National Gallery of Denmark.
