= Gunnar Cederschiöld =

Swedish fencer

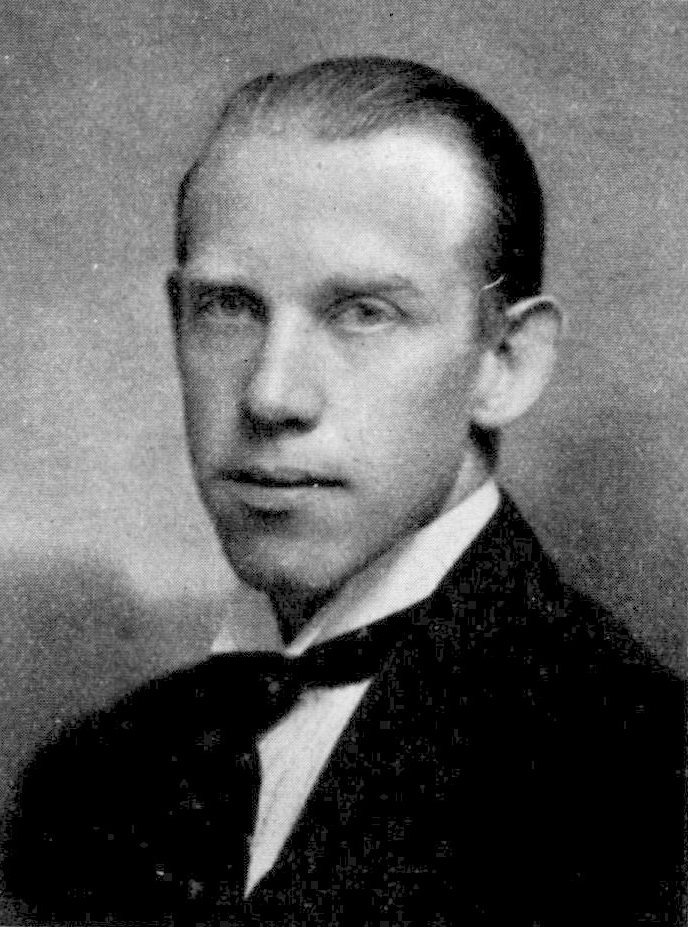
- Cederschiöld around 1920

Personal information
- Born: 30 July 1887 Skåne, Sweden
- Died: 21 November 1949 (aged 62) Jönköping, Sweden

Sport
- Sport: Fencing

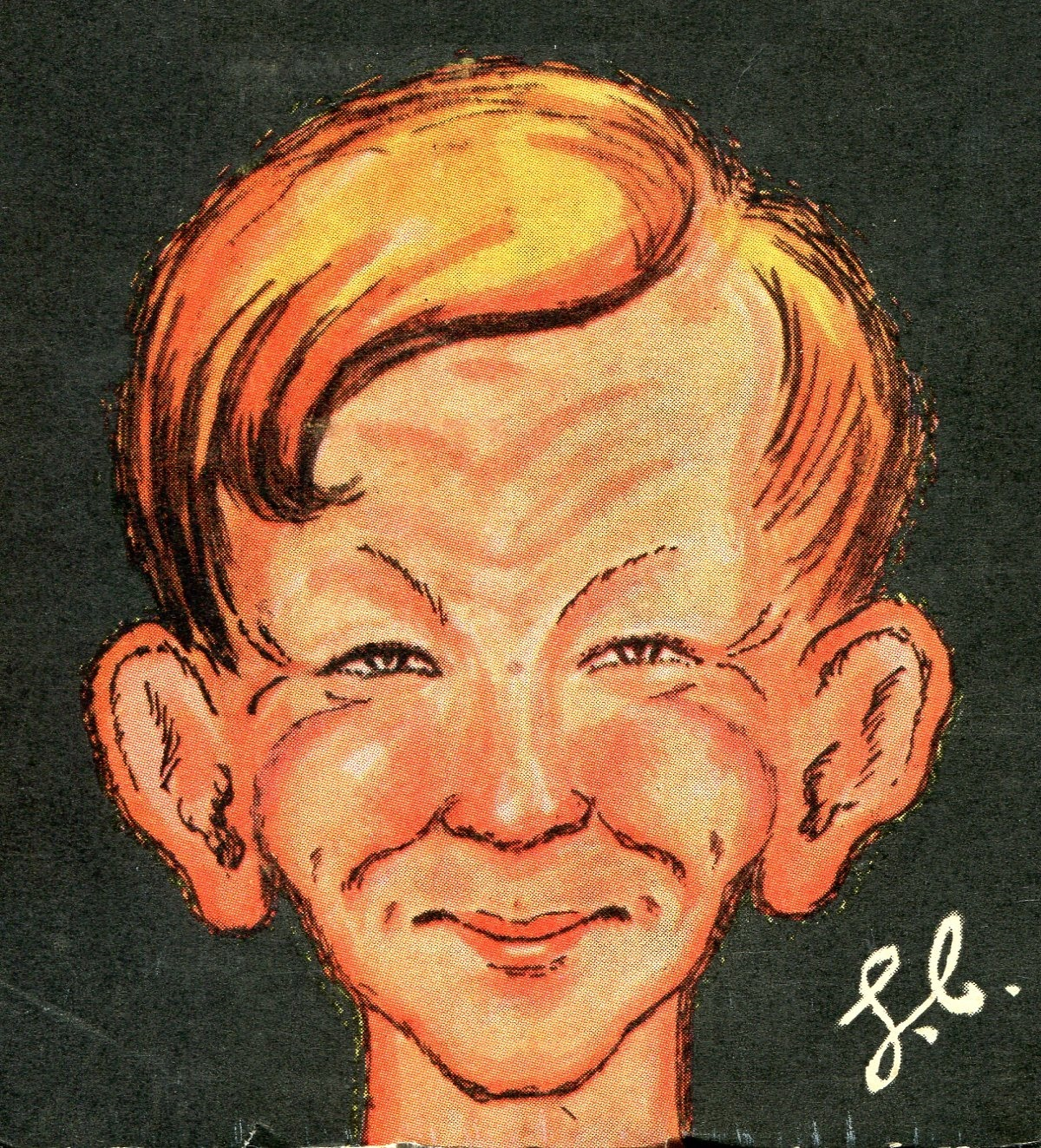
Boyhood self portrait published in 1948

Gunnar Cederschiöld (né Mathias Gunnar Cederschiöld; 30 July 1887 – 21 November 1949) was a Swedish author, artist, school director, and fencer.

== Biography ==
Gunnar Cederschiöld was born as Mathias Gunnar Cederschiöld on 30 July 1887, in Skåne, Sweden. He graduated secondary school in Gothenburg in 1906. He studied painting at Valand Academy in Gothenburg, and continued his art studies in Copenhagen, followed by Paris at Académie de la Grande Chaumière, and as a private student under painter Théophile Steinlen.

As a writer he became known first through letters on Paris to Swedish newspapers, then during and after World War I through depictions which, even when having the character of novels, by their type are skilled journalism. They are collected in a series of books illustrated with Cederschiöld's quickly accomplished drawings.

In 1919 Cederschiöld was managing director of AB France-Afrique in Paris, president of the Académie Scandinave in Paris, and the director for Société genérale des Allumettes in 1927.

He competed in the individual and team épée events at the 1928 Summer Olympics.

Gunnar Cederschiöld was married to the daughter and only child of sociologist Gustaf F. Steffen. The couple had three children.

== Bibliography ==
- Den siste Kergoël Stockholm: Norstedt. 1917. LIBRIS 1650539
- Livstidsfången och andra berättelser Stockholm: Norstedt. 1918. LIBRIS 1650543
- I skärselden och på andra ställen Stockholm: Hökerberg. 1931. LIBRIS 1352644
- Han blev miljonär : roman. Stockholm: Natur o. kultur 1947. LIBRIS 1390578
- Bland artister och hyggligt folk i Paris Stockholm: Ljus. 1915. LIBRIS 1632234
- I väntan på segern : studier från Frankrike under kriget Lund: Gleerup. 1915. LIBRIS 1632235
- Infödingarna på Manhattan : studier och stämningar från New York Stockholm: Ljus. 1916. LIBRIS 1650541
- Krig och hem : karaktärer, interiörer och äventyr från Frankrike och England Lund: C. W. K. Gleerup. 1916. LIBRIS 1650542
- Negrer : studier och äventyr i Franska Västafrika Stockholm: Norstedt. 1917. LIBRIS 1650545
- Äro vi rustade för det ekonomiska kriget Stockholm: Sv. andelsförl. 1917. LIBRIS 1650548
- Elsass-Lothringen : studier Lund: C. W. K. Gleerup. 1918. LIBRIS 1650540
- Maghreb : nutidsbilder från det gamla moriska väldet i Europa och Afrika Stockholm: Norstedt. 1918. LIBRIS 1650544
- Segraren och några av hans hjälpare Stockholm: Norstedt. 1919. LIBRIS 1650546
- Upp- och nedvända världen Stockholm: Norstedt. 1919. LIBRIS 1650547
- Tretton år med Ivar Kreuger Stockholm: Natur och kultur. 1937. LIBRIS 53697
- Sviker Sverige? Stockholm: Natur och kultur. 1943. LIBRIS 1208954
- Rusta fredsarmén Stockholm: Kooperativa förbundets bokförlag. 1944. LIBRIS 1208956
- Som handelsresande i Latinamerika Stockholm: Natur och kultur. 1944. LIBRIS 1390580
- Den svenska tändsticksindustriens historia före de stora sammanslagningarna Stockholm. 1945. LIBRIS 8198002
- Ä' vi så'na? Stockholm: Ljus. 1945. LIBRIS 1390581
- Ja, se pojkar Stockholm: Natur och kultur. 1948. LIBRIS 1390579
- Efter levande modell Stockholm: Natur o. Kultur. 1949. LIBRIS 1390577
