= Othon Friesz =

French artist (1879–1949)

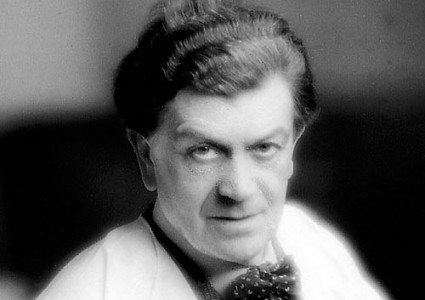
- Photograph from c. 1930
- Born: 6 February 1879
- Died: 10 January 1949 (aged 69)
- Known for: Painter
- Movement: Post-Impressionism; Fauvism

Achille-Émile Othon Friesz (6 February 1879 – 10 January 1949), who later called himself Othon Friesz, a native of Le Havre, was a French artist of the Fauvist movement.

== Biography ==
Othon Friesz was born in Le Havre, the son of a long line of shipbuilders and sea captains. He went to school in his native city. It was while he was at the Lycée that he met his lifelong friend Raoul Dufy. He and Dufy studied at the Le Havre School of Fine Arts in 1895–96 and then went to Paris together for further study. In Paris, Friesz met Henri Matisse, Albert Marquet, and Georges Rouault. Like them, he rebelled against the academic teaching of Bonnat and became a member of the Fauves, exhibiting with them in 1907. The following year, Friesz returned to Normandy and to a much more traditional style of painting, since he had discovered that his personal goals in painting were firmly rooted in the past. He opened his own studio in 1912 and taught until 1914 at which time he joined the army for the duration of the war. He resumed living in Paris in 1919 and remained there, except for brief trips to Toulon and the Jura Mountains, until his death in 1949.

During the last thirty years of his life, he painted in a style completely removed from that of his earlier colleagues and his contemporaries. Having abandoned the lively arabesques and brilliant colors of his Fauve years, Friesz returned to the more sober palette he had learned in Le Havre from his professor Charles Lhuillier and to an early admiration for Poussin, Chardin, and Corot. He painted in a manner that respected Cézanne's ideas of logical composition, simple tonality, solidity of volume, and distinct separation of planes. A faint baroque flavor adds vigor to his (most well-known) landscapes, still lifes, and figure paintings.

Friesz died in Paris. He is buried in the Cimetière du Montparnasse in Paris. His pupils included the painters Marthe Rakine and Heini Waser.

== Paintings ==
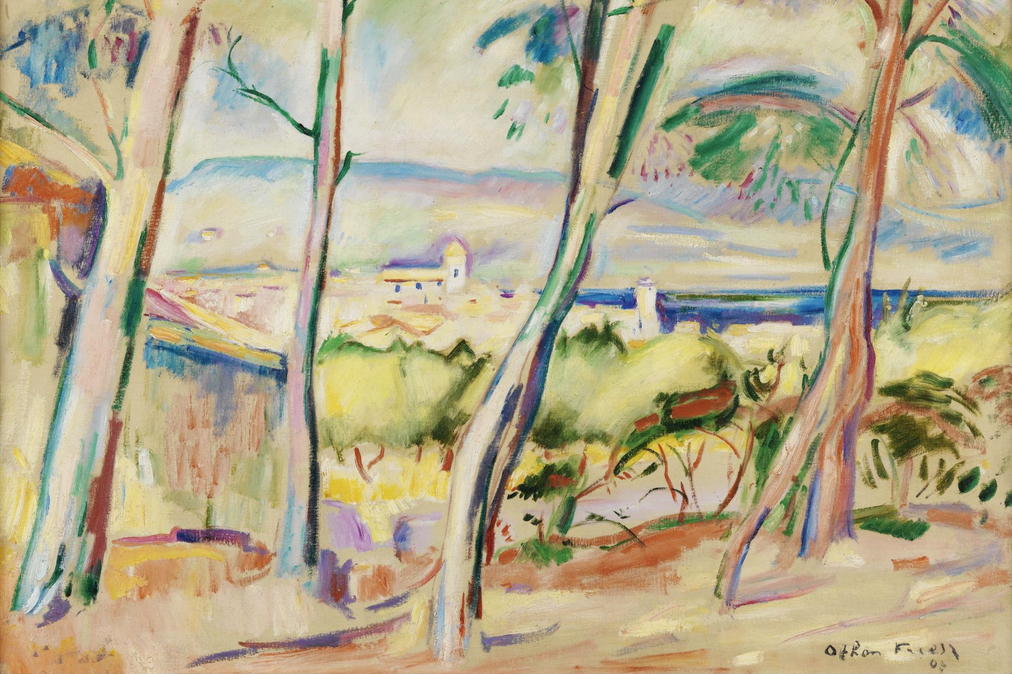
Landscape at La Ciotat, 1907, oil on canvas, 59.9 × 72.9 cm

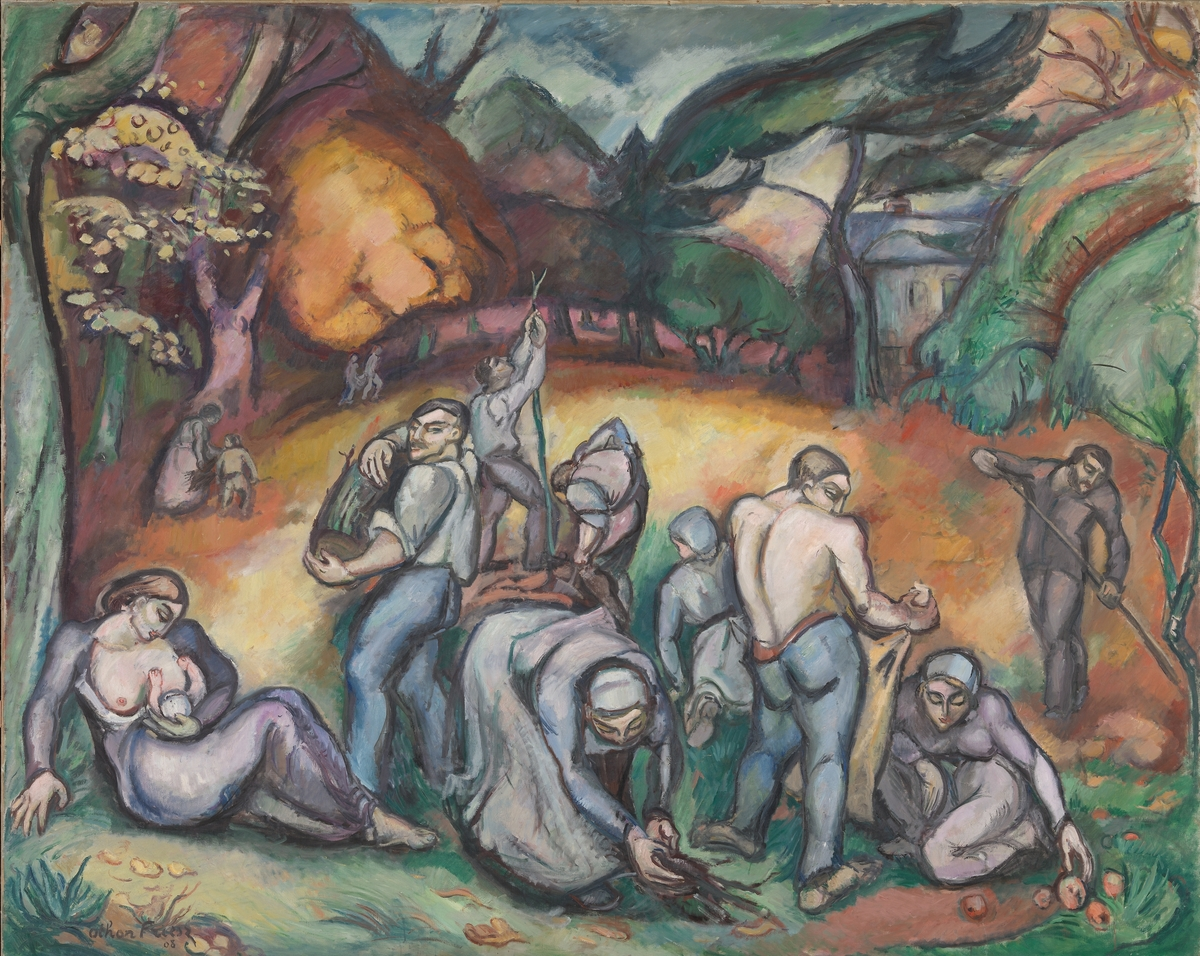
Autumn labour, 1907–1908, oil on canvas, 200.5 × 250 cm, National Museum of Art, Architecture and Design, Oslo

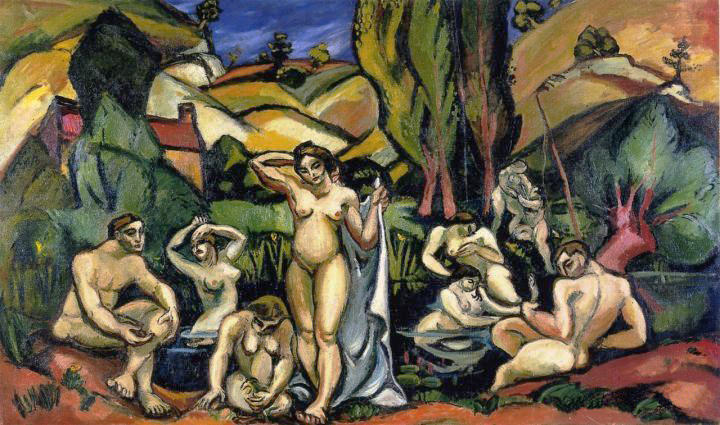
Les Baigneuses des Andelys (The Bathers of Andelys), 1908, oil on canvas, 97 × 162 cm, Musée du Petit Palais, Geneva

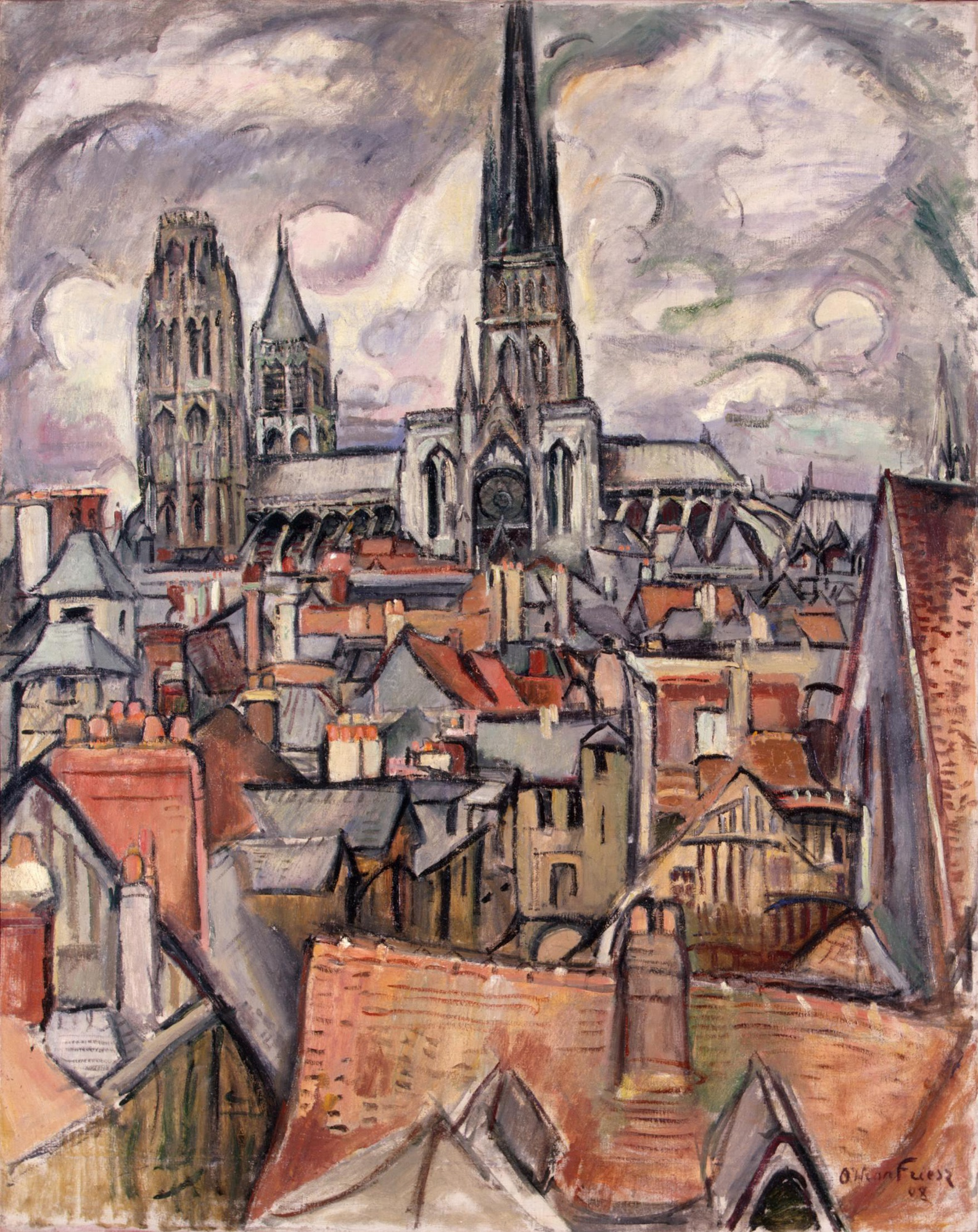
Roofs and Cathedral in Rouen, 1908, oil on canvas. 119 × 95.5 cm. In the collection of the Hermitage Museum, Saint Petersburg

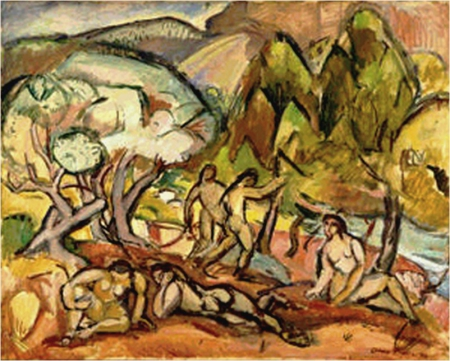
Landscape with Figures, 1909, oil on canvas. 65 × 83 cm, Museum of Modern Art, New York

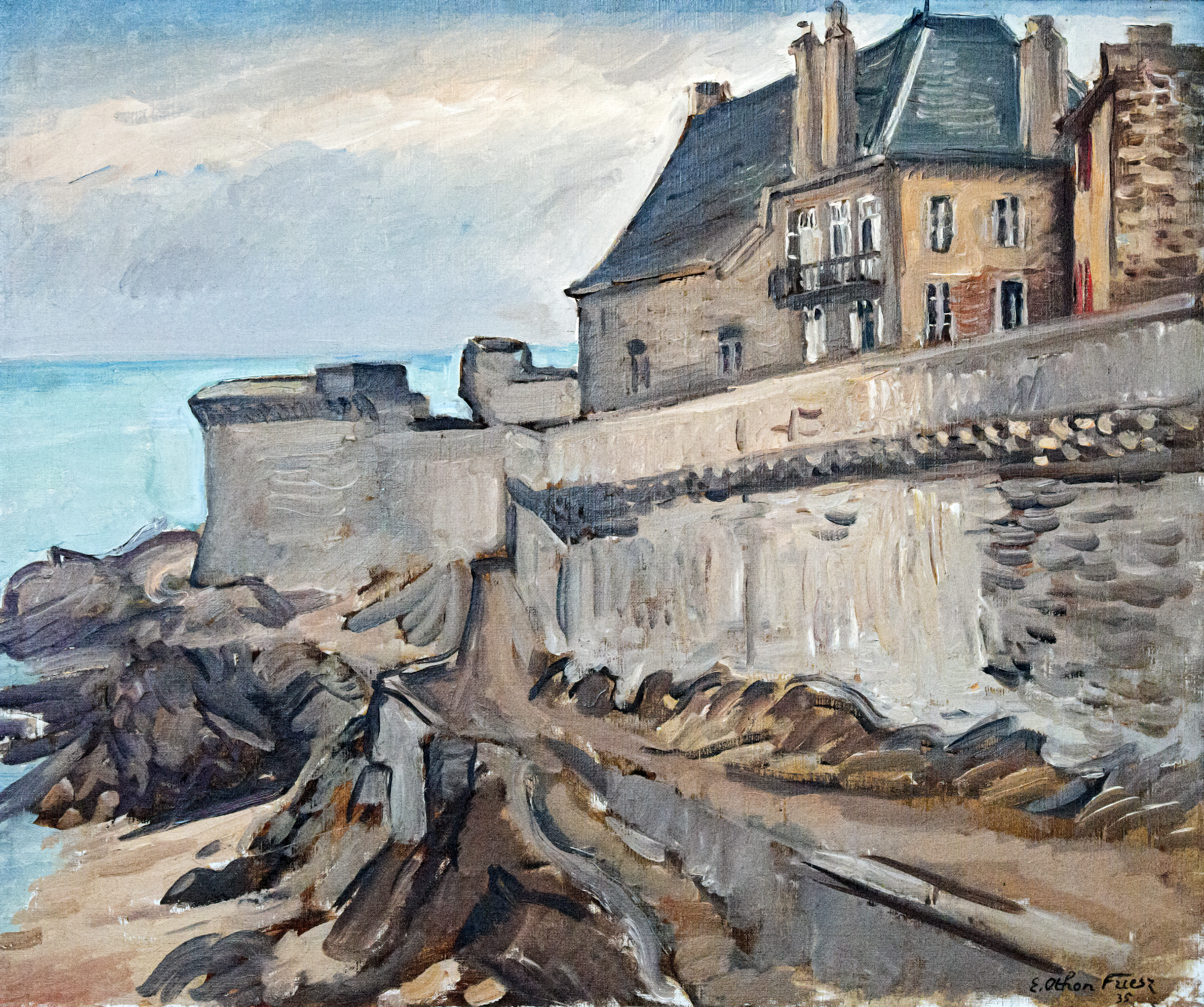
The ramparts of Saint-Malo, 1935, oil on canvas, Musée Toulouse-Lautrec, Albi

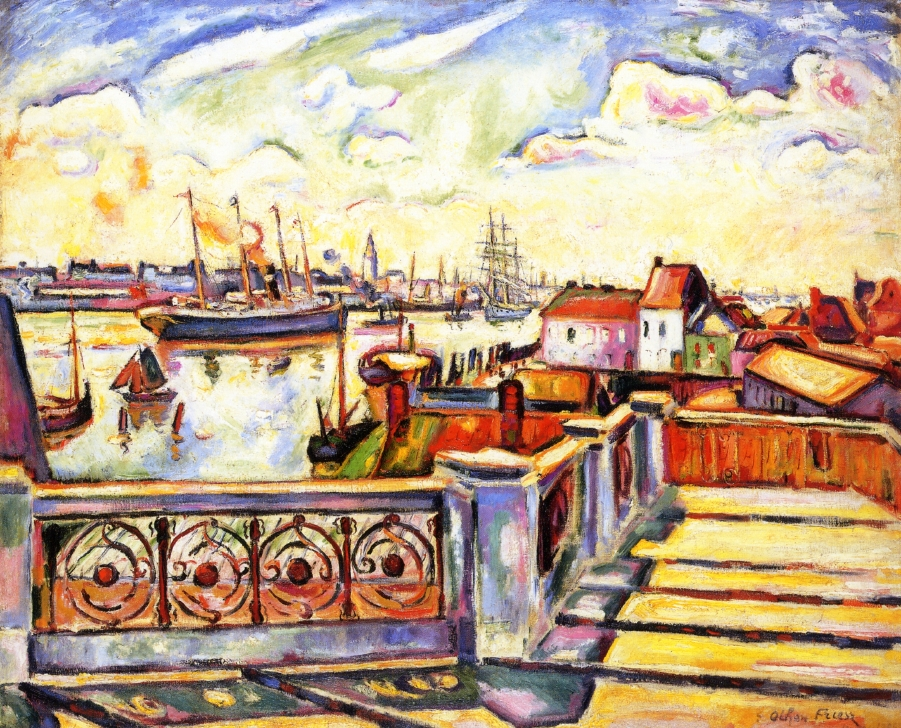
The Port of Antwerp, 1906

== Illustrations ==
- Jean Cocteau, Bertrand Guégan (1892–1943); L'almanach de Cocagne pour l'an 1920–1922, Dédié aux vrais Gourmands Et aux Francs Buveurs
