= List of Chilean artists =

This is a list of notable of visual artists from, or associated with, Chile.

== A ==
- Astrid Alcayaga (born 1974), painter
- Arturo Pacheco Altamirano (1903–1978), painter
- Graciela Aranis (1908-1996), painter
- Claudia Aravena (born 1968), artist, curator, filmmaker, and professor
- Ximena Armas (born 1946), painter

== B ==
- José Balmes (1927–2016), painter
- Gracia Barrios (1927-2020), painter
- Catalina Bauer (born 1976), visual artist
- Joan Belmar (born 1970), visual artist
- Samy Benmayor (born 1956), painter
- Francisca Benítez (born 1974), visual artist and activist
- Claudio Bravo (1936–2011), hyper-realism painter
- Roser Bru (1923–2021), painter and engraver
- Pablo Burchard (1875–1964), painter

== C ==
- Celia Castro (1860–1930), painter
- Carlos Catasse (1944-2010), painter
- Santos Chávez (1934–2001), printmaker
- Marta Colvin (1907–1995), sculptor
- Adolfo Couve (1940–1998), artist and writer
- Eugenio Cruz Vargas (1923–2014), painter and poet

== D ==
- Juan Davila (born 1946), artist
- Emma Formas de Dávila (1883–1959), painter
- Marcela Donoso (born 1961), painter
- Juan Downey (1940–1993), video artist

== E ==
- José Tomás Errázuriz (1856–1927), landscape painter and diplomat
- Virginia Errázuriz (born 1941), painter

== F ==
- Freddy Flores Knistoff (1948–), painter and writer

== G ==
- Lily Garafulic (1914–2012), sculptor
- Teresa Gazitúa (born 1941), painter
- Álvaro Guevara (1894–1951), painter
- Liliana Wilson Grez (born 1953), painter

== H ==
- Laila Havilio (born 1960), sculptor

== J ==
- Onofre Jarpa (1849–1940), painter
- Guillermo Jullian de la Fuente (1931–2008), architect and painter

== L ==
- Laureano Ladrón de Guevara (1889–1968), painter, printmaker, muralist, and educator
- Juana Lecaros (1920–1993), painter, printmaker
- Pedro Lira (1845–1912), painter

== M ==
- Roberto Matta (1911–2002), painter
- Rebeca Matte (1875–1929), sculptor
- Mariana Matthews (born 1946), photographer, curator, and visual artist
- Carlos Maturana (born 1953), artist
- Elmina Moisan (1897-1938), painter
- Camilo Mori (1896–1973), painter
- Pedro Olmos Muñoz (1911-1991), painter

== O ==
- Manuel Ortíz de Zárate (1887–1946), painter

== P ==
- Catalina Parra (born 1940), photomontage artist
- Matilde Pérez (1916–2014), kinetic artist
- Henriette Petit (1894-1983), painter
- Christiane Pooley (born 1983), visual artist
- Dora Puelma (1898-1972), painter, sculptor
- Inés Puyó (1906–1996) painter

== R ==
- Laura Rodig (1901-1972) painter, sculptor, illustrator, educator
- José Manuel Ramírez Rosales (1804–1877), painter and entrepreneur
- Alejandra Ruddoff (born 1960), sculptor

== S ==
- Cosme San Martín (1850–1906), painter and art teacher
- Kamal Siegel (born 1978), digital artist
- Pablo Siebel (born 1954), painter
- Carlos Sotomayor (1911-1988), Cubist painter
- Francisca Sutil (born 1952), painter

== V ==
- Cecilia Vicuña (born 1948)
- Ramón Subercaseaux Vicuña (1854–1937), painter and diplomat

== See also ==
- List of Chilean women artists
- List of Latin American artists
- Culture of Chile
- Chilean art
