= List of Chilean women artists =

This is a list of women artists who were born in Chile or whose artworks are closely associated with that country.

== A ==
- Astrid Alcayaga (born 1974), painter
- Graciela Aranis (1908–1996), painter
- Claudia Aravena (born 1968), artist, curator, filmmaker, and professor
- Ximena Armas (born 1946), painter
- Herminia Arrate (1895–1941), painter, First Lady

== B ==
- Catalina Bauer (born 1976), visual artist
- Roser Bru (1923–2021), painter and engraver

== C ==
- Gloria Camiruaga (1941–2006), video artist
- Celia Castro (1880–1930), Chile's first professional female artist
- Marta Colvin (1907–1995), sculptor
- Ana Cortés (1895–1998), painter

== D ==
- Emma Formas de Dávila (1883–1959), painter
- Marcela Donoso (born 1961), painter

== E ==
- Virginia Errázuriz (born 1941), painter

== G ==
- Lily Garafulic (1914–2012), sculptor
- Teresa Gazitúa (born 1941), painter, writer, educator

== H ==
- Laila Havilio (born 1960), sculptor

== L ==
- Juana Lecaros (1920–1993), painter, printmaker

== M ==
- Rebeca Matte Bello (1875–1929), sculptor
- Aurora Mira (1863–1939), painter
- Magdalena Mira (1859–1930), painter and sculptor
- Elmina Moisan (1897–1938), Chilean painter
- Ximena Morla Lynch (1891–1987), painter

== P ==
- Catalina Parra (born 1940), photomontage artist
- Matilde Pérez (1916–2014), painter, sculptor, kinetic artist
- Henriette Petit (1894–1983), painter
- Christiane Pooley (born 1983), visual artist
- Dora Puelma (1898–1972), painter, sculptor
- Inés Puyó (1906–1996) painter

== R ==
- Laura Rodig (1901–1972), painter, sculptor, illustrator, educator
- Lotty Rosenfeld (1943–2020), interdisciplinary artist
- Alejandra Ruddoff (born 1960), sculptor

== S ==
- Soledad Salamé (born 1954), printmaker, multimedia installations, sculptor; founder of Sol Print Studio
- Francisca Sutil (born 1952), painter and printmaker

== T ==
- Janet Toro (born 1963), performance artist, activist

== V ==
- Eugenia Vargas (born 1949), contemporary artist
- Cecilia Vicuña (born 1948), poet, artist, filmmaker, activist

== Z ==
- Ximena Zomosa (born 1966), contemporary artist

== See also ==
- List of Chilean artists
