= Alejandra =

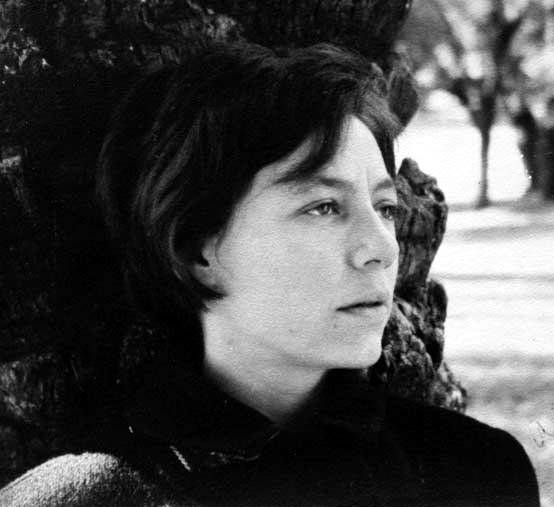
- Alejandra Pizarnik
- Pronunciation: [aleˈxandɾa]
- Gender: Feminine
- Language: Spanish

Origin
- Meaning: "Defender, protector of womankind"
- Region of origin: Greece

Other names
- Variant form: Alexandra (Archaic form in Spanish); Alejandrina (Unpopular form)
- See also: Alejandra, Alexandra, Alexander, Alex, Alessandro, Alexandru, Alexandre

Alejandra is a feminine given name, the Spanish form of the English name Alexandra, derived from the Latin Alexandra and the Ancient Greek Alexándra (Ἀλεξάνδρα). It is the feminine form of the Spanish name Alejandro. The name Alexandra (now an archaic form) was the primary rendition in Spanish. However, the transition from Alexandra to Alejandra resulted from specific phonetic and orthographic adaptations in the Spanish language, whereby the letter "x" was replaced by "j" to conform to the language's phonological and orthographic conventions.

Alejandra is an uncommon name in Hispanic culture, where it has minimal prominence in Latin American countries. The name Alejandra also has another form in Spanish, Alejandrina (extracted from the Latin Alexandrina), which can also exist as a patronymic surname.

== Personalities ==
- Alejandra Ávalos (born 1965), Mexican actress
- Alejandra Azcárate (born 1978), Colombian model and actress
- Alejandra Barrales (born 1967), Mexican politician
- Alejandra Benítez (born 1980), Venezuelan sabre fencer
- Alejandra Bogue (born 1965), Mexican actress
- Alejandra Braña (born 2004), Spanish gymnast
- Alejandra Bravo (born 1961), Mexican biochemist
- Alejandra Da Passano (1947–2014), Argentine actress
- Alejandra del Moral Vela (born 1983), Mexican politician
- Alejandra Echevarría (born 1989), Spanish model and singer
- Alejandra Estudillo (born 2005), Mexican diver
- Alejandra Fosalba (born 1969), Chilean actress
- Alejandra García (pole vaulter) (born 1973), Argentine pole vaulter
- Alejandra Ghersi (born 1989), Venezuelan musician
- Alejandra Granillo (born 1991), Mexican tennis player
- Alejandra Gulla (born 1977), Argentine field hockey player
- Alejandra Gutiérrez (disambiguation)
- Alejandra Guzmán (born 1968), Mexican singer and actress
- Alejandra Ibáñez (born 2000), American wheelchair basketball player
- Alejandra Krauss (born 1956), Chilean politician
- Alejandra Lazcano (born 1984), Mexican actress
- Alejandra León Gastélum (born 1976), Mexican politician
- Alejandra Llamas (born 1970), Mexican writer
- Alejandra Matus, Chilean journalist and writer
- Alejandra Meco (born 1990), Spanish actress and dancer
- Alejandra Meyer (1937–2007), Mexican actress
- Alejandra Oliveras (born 1978), Argentine boxer
- Alejandra Onieva (born 1992), Spanish actress
- Alejandra Otero (born 1983), Venezuelan comedian
- Alejandra Peña, Venezuelan politician
- Alejandra Paola Pérez López (born 1998), Venezuelan Paralympic athlete who competes in sprinting events
- Alejandra Pizarnik (1936–1972), Argentine poet
- Alejandra Procuna (born 1969), Mexican actress
- Alejandra Ramos (born 1958), Chilean athlete
- Alejandra Robles (born 1978), Mexican dancer and singer
- Alejandra Robles Gil (born 1990), Mexican actress
- Alejandra Ruddoff (born 1960), Chilean sculptor
- Alejandra Sandoval (born 1980), Colombian actress
- Alejandra Usquiano (born 1993), Colombian archer
- Alejandra Valencia (born 1994), Mexican archer

== See also ==
- Alejandra (disambiguation)
- María Alejandra
