= Pepe Coronado =

Pepe Coronado is a printmaker and visual artist from the Dominican Republic. His work is inspired by his experience as an immigrant to the United States, focusing on themes of migration, displacement, and identity. As the founder of Dominican York Proyecto GRAFICA and Coronado Print Studio, Pepe Coronado encourages collaborative printmaking and commits to serving other Dominican American artists.

== Early life ==
=== Childhood in the Dominican Republic ===
Pepe Coronado was born in the Dominican Republic in 1965. At the time, the Dominican Civil War was in full force, prompting the US to intervene with Operation Power Pack, exposing Coronado to a violent environment early in his life.

=== Immigration to the United States ===
In 1989, Coronado immigrated to the United States with his family due to the unstable economic situation in the Dominican Republic at the time. This was caused by the Balaguer regime, which created severe economic violence for the Dominican working class. This experience was a key part of his personal and artistic development, as themes of migration are prevalent in his work.

== Career ==
=== Artistic training and development ===
Coronado began his career in the 1990s after settling in Austin, Texas. There, he began to explore the practice of silkscreen printing and built Caribe Graphics, a T-shirt printing business. His formal artistic education began at the Laguna Gloria Art Museum, where he met Sam Coronado, an instructor and important mentor. Sam Coronado recruited Coronado to become a printer at his studio, marking the formal start of his career. His interest in printmaking was mainly inspired by Sam Coronado. Following his time in Austin, Coronado moved to Washington, D.C. and later New York City. In Washington D.C., he received his Master of Art degree from the Maryland Institute College of Art. These moves expanded his participation in broader Latinx artistic networks.

=== Teaching ===
During his career, Coronado taught printmaking at three schools, including Corcoran College of Art, Georgetown University, and Maryland Institute College of Art. In addition, he has served as the master printer Pyramid Atlantic, the Hand Print Workshop International, and the Serie Print Project in Maryland, Virginia, and Texas respectively. As a master printer in the Serie Print Project from 1994 to 1997, Coronado worked with underrepresented Latinx artists, including painters John Hernandez, Cesar Martinez, Alex Rubio, and Liliana Wilson.

=== Coronado Print Studio ===
Coronado Print Studio originally opened in East Harlem in 2006, but relocated to Austin, Texas in 2019. The studio serves as both his personal workspace and a collaborative hub for printmaking. It is classified as a print workshop, which according to Tatiana Reinoza is an "engine of production and often invests in print projects as a publisher."

=== Dominican York Proyecto GRAFICA ===
Pepe Coronado leads the Dominican York Proyecto GRAFICA (DYPG), a New York-based printmaking collective made up of twelve Dominican American artists. Print collectives are groups of artists that work together on individual pieces, portfolios, exhibitions, etc. The members of the collective include Carlos Almonte (former member), Pepe Coronado, René de los Santos, Iliana Emilia García (former member), Reynaldo García Pantaleón (former member), Scherezade García (former member), Alex Guerrero, Luanda Lozano, Miguel Luciano, Chiqui Junior Mendoza (former member), Moses Ros-Suárez and Rider Ureña. Together, these artists explore the theme of Dominicanidad through unique prints with a variety of unique symbols. Their work contributes to the idea of "Dominican York," a term that describes the cultural identity of migrants from the Dominican Republic to New York. The collective exists to publicly advocate for Dominican culture within the United States through exhibitions, lectures, and workshops and advance Dominican American art through innovative collaboration.

== Artistic style and themes ==
=== Dominicanidad and identity ===
A central theme in Coronado's work is Dominicanidad, which represents Dominican cultural identity. His prints explore how Dominican identity develop as people migrate and live in the United States. Coronado uses visual symbolism and collective artistic practices to define Dominican identity in the diaspora.

=== Migration and Diaspora ===
Migration and diaspora are consistent subjects in Coronado's work because of his personal experience as an immigrant. Tatiana Reinoza describes the Dominican diaspora highlighted through Coronado's work as "the island within the island," referring to Dominican York. His prints examine the cultural ties between the Dominican Republic and New York City, emphasizing how migration affects identity and community.

=== Community and collective artmaking ===
During the early 2000s, many Dominican American printmakers experienced difficulties breaking into a predominantly Nuyorican and Chicanx Latin American art market in New York. Through his role in the DYPG, Coronado provided a platform for emerging Dominican artists to gain visibility in the New York art market.

== Notable works and exhibitions ==
=== Notable works ===
1. Bailando con el sol, 1996 - Coronado's Bailando con el sol analyzes the connection between the sun, a human-like figure, and the Earth.
2. U.S/D.R A Love-Hate Relationship, 2012 - Coronado's U.S/D.R A Love-Hate Relationship includes a map of both the United States and the Dominican Republic, speaking to the movement of people and goods between the countries.
3. Citizenship Revoked, 2014 - Coronado's Citizenship Revoked addresses a court ruling that revoked the citizenship of children born to undocumented Haitian parents.

=== Exhibitions ===
1. ¡Printing the Revolution! Smithsonian American Art Museum. Washington DC. - November 2020 to August 2021
2. ¡Printing the Revolution! The Rise and Impact of Chicano Graphics. 1965 to Now, Amon Carter Museum of American Art, Fort Worth, TX - February 20, 2022 to May 8, 2022
3. Uptown: Nasty Women, Bad Hombres. El Museo Del Barrio, New York, New York - June 2017 to November 2017

== Recognition and legacy ==
=== Influence on Dominican American art ===
Through his print studios, Pepe Coronado formed strong Latinx artist communities that allowed people to collaborate and learn unique artistic practices. His work reflects efforts to advocate for an authentic Dominican American identity.

=== Contributions to Latinx printmaking ===
Beyond individual pieces, Coronado works with many artists of unique Latin American descent. For example, Coronado has collaborated with Haitian diasporic artists, including Vladimir Cybil Charlier, to address shared traditions between the nations. Through these collaborative practices, Coronado's work addresses an all-encompassing Caribbean diaspora, rather than exclusively focusing on the Dominican Republic.
