= Benson Latin American Collection =

Comprehensive collection of Latin American materials

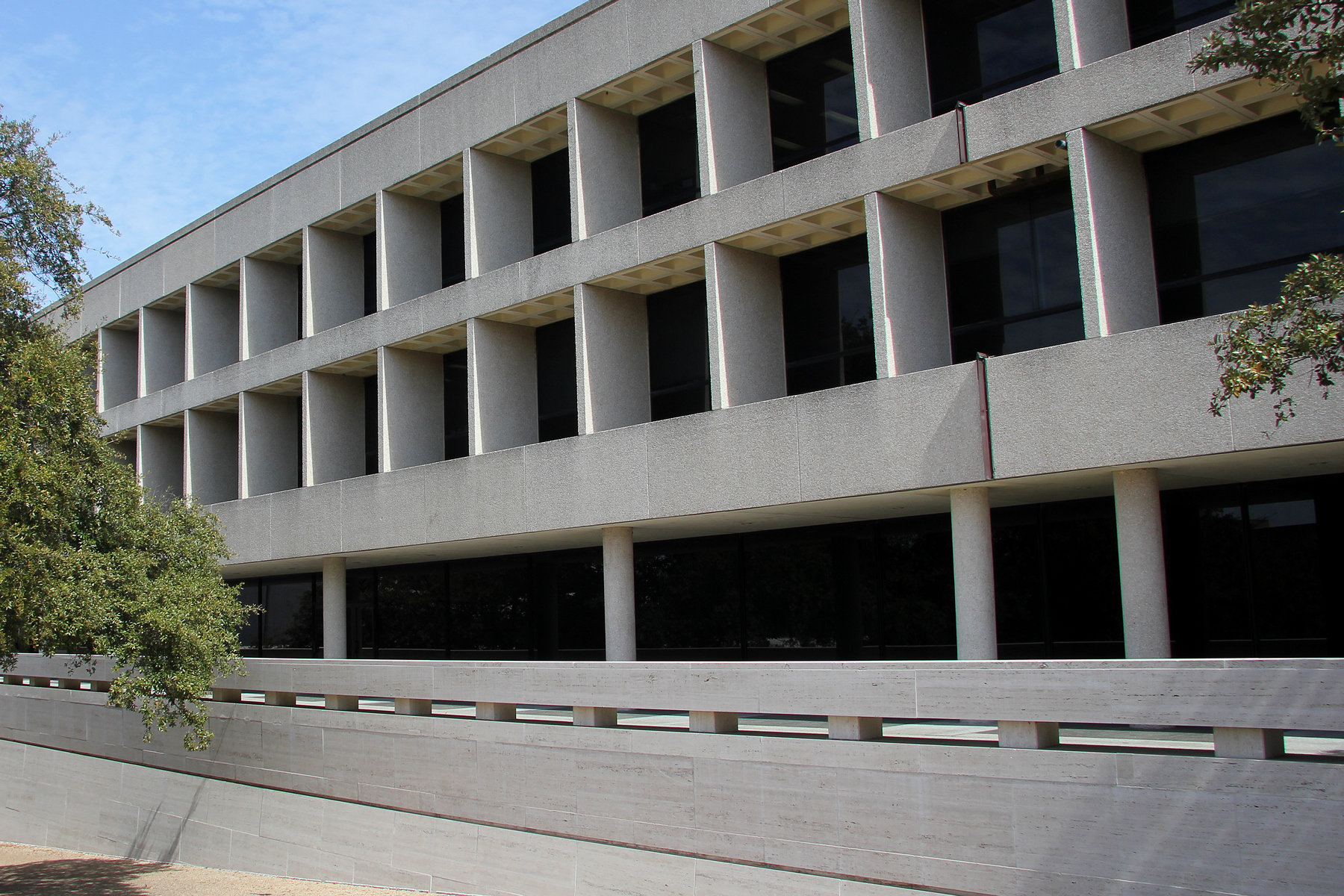
- Sid Richardson Hall, home of the Benson Collection
- Location: Sid Richardson Hall, University of Texas at Austin
- Established: 1921

Collection
- Items collected: Books, photographs, maps, audio
- Size: Over 1 million books

Other information
- Affiliation: University of Texas

The Nettie Lee Benson Latin American Collection is part of the University of Texas Library system in partnership with the Teresa Lozano Long Institute for Latin American Studies (LLILAS), located in Austin, Texas, and named for the historian and bibliographer, Nettie Lee Benson (1905-1993). It is one of the world's most comprehensive collections of Latin American materials.

The collections are housed in the Sid Richardson Hall, which also houses the Dolph Briscoe Center of American History and Barker Texas History Collections Center. This library serves LLILAS as a hub for studies pertaining to Latin American history and studies. The library includes over 970,000 books, 19,000 maps, 93,500 photographs, 4,000 linear feet of manuscripts, 11,500 broadsides, and 50,000 items in other multimedia formats. Most of the sources are about Texas and Mexico, but also include items from the other Latin American countries, particularly: Central America, Chile, Peru, and Brazil.

The Collection is the home of interviews collected by the Voces Oral History Center.

== History of the Collection ==
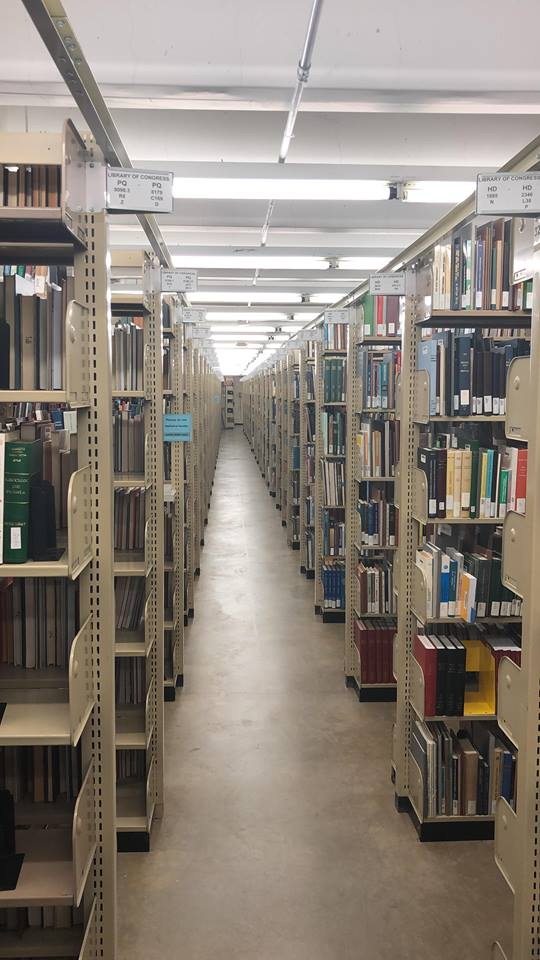
The fifth floor stacks at the Benson Collection, University of Texas

The Latin American holdings at the University of Texas have increased since the early twentieth century. Historian Carlos E. Castañeda wrote a history of the collection to 1940, detailing deals for some acquisitions that he observed. Latin American historian Charles W. Hackett, along with three other University of Texas professors went to the 1920 inauguration of revolutionary General Álvaro Obregón as president of Mexico. Hackett learned that the library of historian and bibliophile Genaro García was for sale following his death. Hackett arranged for an appraisal by University of Texas and the deal was negotiated. The collection was enormously rich, 25,000 printed items, newspapers, personal papers of Vicente Guerrero, Antonio López de Santa Anna, Valentín Gómez Farías, Lucas Alamán, Vicente Riva Palacio and others were part of the collection that was transported to Austin by a special train. The expansion of University of Texas's role in Latin American studies dates to this acquisition.

The university's Latin American collection was further enriched by a number of acquisitions, including a donation of volumes by the Hispanic Society of America and papers of U.S. historian Justin H. Smith, the collection of Chilean historian Diego Muñoz, which included many works by or about José Toribio Medina. In addition, the library acquired the private collection of Paraguayan historian Manuel Gondra. A huge addition to the library was the acquisition of virtually all the collection of Mexican historian Joaquín García Icazbalceta that deal with sixteenth-century Mexico. The García Icazbalceta collection included rare and important sixteenth-century printed works, including Bishop Juan de Zumárraga's 1544 Doctrina, Fray Pedro de Gante's Doctrina, writings of Francisco Cervantes de Salazar. Manuscripts include an autograph letter by Hernán Cortés, a memorial by Fray Bartolomé de las Casas, the residencia of the first viceroy of Mexico, Antonio de Mendoza, and the manuscript of Fray Gerónimo de Mendieta's history of the Franciscans in Mexico.

Nettie Lee Benson, for whom the Latin American collection is named, devoted the greatest part of her career to expanding the library's holdings by traveling to Latin America to acquire materials and she "developed an innovative acquisition methodology adapted to the conditions in the Latin-American book-publishing trade." In a taped interview, Benson discusses the collection and her role in helping build it.

In 1974, the Benson started the Mexican American Library Program (MALP), responding to student demands that led to the creation of UT's Ethnic Studies programs (now Black Studies and Latino Studies) in 1969. Since then, the Benson has become a leader in building Latinx circulating and archival collections. The Benson holds the papers of prominent Latinos including Alurista, Gloria E. Anzaldúa, Sam Coronado, Carmen Lomas Garza, José Ángel Gutiérrez, Américo Paredes, and Carmen Tafolla. The Benson also has the records of organizations including League of United Latin American Citizens and the National Latino/a Lesbian and Gay Organization.
