= Alejandra (disambiguation) =

Alejandra is the Spanish form of the Greek female given name Alexandra.

Alejandra may also refer to:

- Alejandra, Argentina, populated places in Argentina
- Alejandra (1942 film), a 1942 Mexican film
- Alejandra (1956 film), a 1956 Argentine film
- Alejandra (TV series), a Venezuelan telenovela

== See also ==
- María Alejandra
