= Henry Ballate =

Cuban-American visual artist

- Born: July 30, 1966 (age 60)
- Education: Miami International University of Art and Design M.F.A Accademia italiana in Florence, Italy
- Known for: Visual Arts

Henry Ballate (born July 30, 1966, in Aguada de Pasajeros, Cuba), is a Cuban-American visual artist, curator and Art History Professor. He left Cuba in a flimsy raft through the treacherous waters of the Florida Straits in 1994. He currently lives and works between New York City and Miami.

== Education ==
Henry received his MFA in Visual Arts and his BFA in Graphic Design from Miami International University of Art and Design in 2007. Previously, he studied drawing and painting at the Accademia italiana in Florence, Italy, and graduated from the Art Instructors school in Matanzas, Cuba.

== Art ==
In his work, Henry merges art history with the contemporary style by using popular symbols, visuals, and techniques of his own making. He deals with provocative themes in his art, mixing them with popular culture in order to create a significant message. His work is easily recognizable through his use of known iconography, which are essential to his public interventions and appropriations. Throughout his career, he has exhibited at solo and group shows in America, Europe, and Asia. His works are part of private collections in the United States, Canada, Germany, Spain, France, and Italy.

== Selected exhibitions ==
- 2019 – The Repeating Island: Contemporary Art of the Caribbean, Kendall Art Center, Miami, Florida, USA
- 2019 – Crosscurrents: Contemporary Selections from the Rodríguez Collection of Cuban Artists, Foosaner Art Museum, Melbourne, FL. US
- 2018 – Tech Effect, Cornell Art Museum, Delray Beach, FL. USA
- 2018 – Against Gravity. Doral Contemporary Art Museum (DORCAM). Doral, USA.
- 2018 – MUD Foundation Gallery, Miami, FL. USA
- 2017 – Kendall Art Center, Miami, FL. USA
- 2016 – Walker Art Center, Minneapolis, USA
- 2015 – Vargas Gallery, Pembroke Pines, USA
- 2014 – Art-Street Project, Valencia, Spain
- 2013 – London Art Biennale, Chelsea, London, UK
- 2013 – Art-Street Project During Art Basel Week, Miami, USA
- 2012 – Vargas Gallery, Pembroke Pines, USA
- 2011 – MIU Gallery, Miami, USA
- 2011 – SOHO ARTS, Miami, USA
- 2010 – Art Basel Miami, Miami, USA
- 2010 – Arteamericas, Miami, USA
- 2009 – National Art Gallery, Dhaka, Bangladesh
- 2009 – Galeria Nacional, San Jose, Costa Rica
- 2008 – Art Basel Miami, Miami, USA
- 2008 – State Art Collection, Tallahassee, USA
- 2007 – FYR Arte Contemporanea, Florence, Italy
- 2006 – Art Basel Miami, Miami, USA
- 2005 – Art Basel Miami, Miami, USA
- 2004 – Art Miami, Miami, USA
- 2004 – Latin American Art Museum, Miami, USA
- 2003 – Art Basel Miami, Miami, USA
- 2003 – Latin American Art Museum, Miami, USA
- 2002 – Art Basel Miami, Miami, USA
- 2001 – Florence Biennale, Dialogue Among Civilizations, Florence, Italy
- 2001 – Sirius Studio Art Gallery, Miami, USA
- 1992 – Galería Provincial de Arte, Cienfuegos, Cuba
- 1992 – Casa de Joven Creador, Cienfuegos, Cuba
- 1991 – Centro Provincial de Artes Plásticas, Habana, Cuba
- 1990 – Galería de Arte Varadero, Matanzas, Cuba
- 1990 – Galería de Matanzas, Matanzas, Cuba
- 1989 – Galería Aguada, Aguada de Pasajeros, Cienfuegos, Cuba

== Curated exhibitions ==
- 2019 – Retratos en chino: Aldo Menéndez Retrospective (1999–2019) Kendall Art Center.
- 2019 – Ciro Quintana: Land-Scape of the Cuban Art, Kendall Art Center.
- 2018 – Four artists One Generation, Kendall Art Center.
- 2018 – Unofficial, Kendall Art Center
- 2017 – Across Time: Cuban Artists from vanguardist to contemporaries, Kendall Art Center
- 2017 – Artists in Purgatory, Kendall Art Center.
- 2017 – Cuban Slugger by Reynerio Tamayo, Kendall Art Center
- 2016 – Diálogos Místicos by José Bedia, Kendall Art Center.
- 2016 - Moon Woman – Figurative Abstraction by Astrid Alcayaga, Vargas Gallery
- 2016 – International Group Exhibition, 21 New Abstract. Vargas Gallery
- 2015 – Explor-Art Puerto Rico, Group Exhibition. Vargas Gallery

== Bibliography ==
- Ballate, Henry. "Poetas en New York: 200 Años de Poesía Hispana" Art Sôlido, 2023. ISBN 979-8366712491
- Ballate, Henry. "Re-Appropriation of Fine Arts Through Technology" Art Sôlido, 2021. ISBN 979-8747710559
- Ballate, Henry. "D FINE Artists and Exhibitions" Rodríguez Collection, 2021. ISBN 979-8707999192
- Ballate, Henry. "Gina Pellón Dressed of waters" Rodríguez Collection, 2020. ISBN 979-8650950349
- Ballate, Henry. "Luna Over Miami" Poesía, Art Sôlido, 2020. ISBN 979-8633171136
- Ballate, Henry. "Error de Imprenta" Poesía, Art Sôlido, 2019. ISBN 978-1701624269
