= Alejandra Gutiérrez =

Alejandra Gutiérrez may refer to:

- Alejandra Gutiérrez Campos (born 1976), Mexican politician
- Alejandra Gutiérrez (actress) (born 1979), Venezuelan actress and model
- Alejandra Gutierrez Oraa (born 1987), Venezuelan television anchor
- Alejandra Gutiérrez (footballer) (born 1994), Mexican footballer
