= Pablo Siebel =

Chilean painter (born 1954)

Pablo Siebel (born December 1954 in Santiago de Chile) is a Chilean painter. He has garnered more than 60 individual and group exhibitions, as well as placements in museums, public and private collections, including the Sala José Saramago in Madrid, Spain.

== Background ==
Siebel moved with his family to Europe in 1970. Following a sojourn in his father's native Germany, in 1971 the family finally settled in Spain.

In Madrid, Siebel concurrently studied law and art. While he obtained his law degree from the Universidad Complutense, he never practiced his father's chosen profession. Instead, he opted to follow his personal like for art.

== Individual exhibitions ==
- 1980 O.C.I. Kitzbühel, Austria
- 1981 Galeria El Claustro, Santiago, Chile
- 1983 Galeria Anais, Munich, Alemania
- 1983 BfG Galerie, Regensburg, Alemania
- 1983 Canning House, Londres, Gran Bretaña
- 1984 Galeria Seiquer, Madrid, España
- 1985 Galerie Berthe, Bargteheide, Alemania
- 1986 Galería Plástica 3, Santiago, Chile
- 1987 Galerie Hartmann, Frankfurt, Alemania
- 1987 Galerie Ruchti, Colonia, Alemania
- 1989 Galerie Kampl, Munich, Alemania
- 1987 Galerie Ruchti, Colonia, Alemania
- 1987 La Galería, Santiago, Chile
- 1994 Musero de Salamanca, Salamanca, España
- 1995 Galería Arte Giani, Frankfurt, Alemania
- 1995 Sala de exposiciones de la Biblioteca de Castilla y León, Valladolid, España
- 1995 Galería Coscoja, Segovia, España
- 1996 Galería Montalbán, Madrid, España
- 1996 Casa de la Cultura de El Espartal, Madrid, España
- 1997 Galería Arte Giani, Frankfurt, Alemania
- 1997 Centro Cultural Las Dehesillas, Leganés, Madrid, España
- 1997 Galería Arte Actual la Dehesa, Santiago, Chile
- 1997 Museo de Arte Contemporáneo, Santiago, Chile
- 1998 Galerie Differente, Hamburgo, Alemania
- 1998 Stadthausgalerie Hamm, Alemania
- 1999 Galería Ángela Sacritán, Madrid, España
- 2001 Centro Cultural Recoleta, Buenos Aires, Argentina
- 2001 "Flores y Fantasmas", Sala La Escondida, Embajada de Chile, Berlín, Alemania
- 2002 Haus Opherdicke, Kreis Unna, Alemania
- 2003 Galerie Wagner, Zürich, Switzerland
- 2003 Cassis, New York, USA
