= Alejandra Llamas =

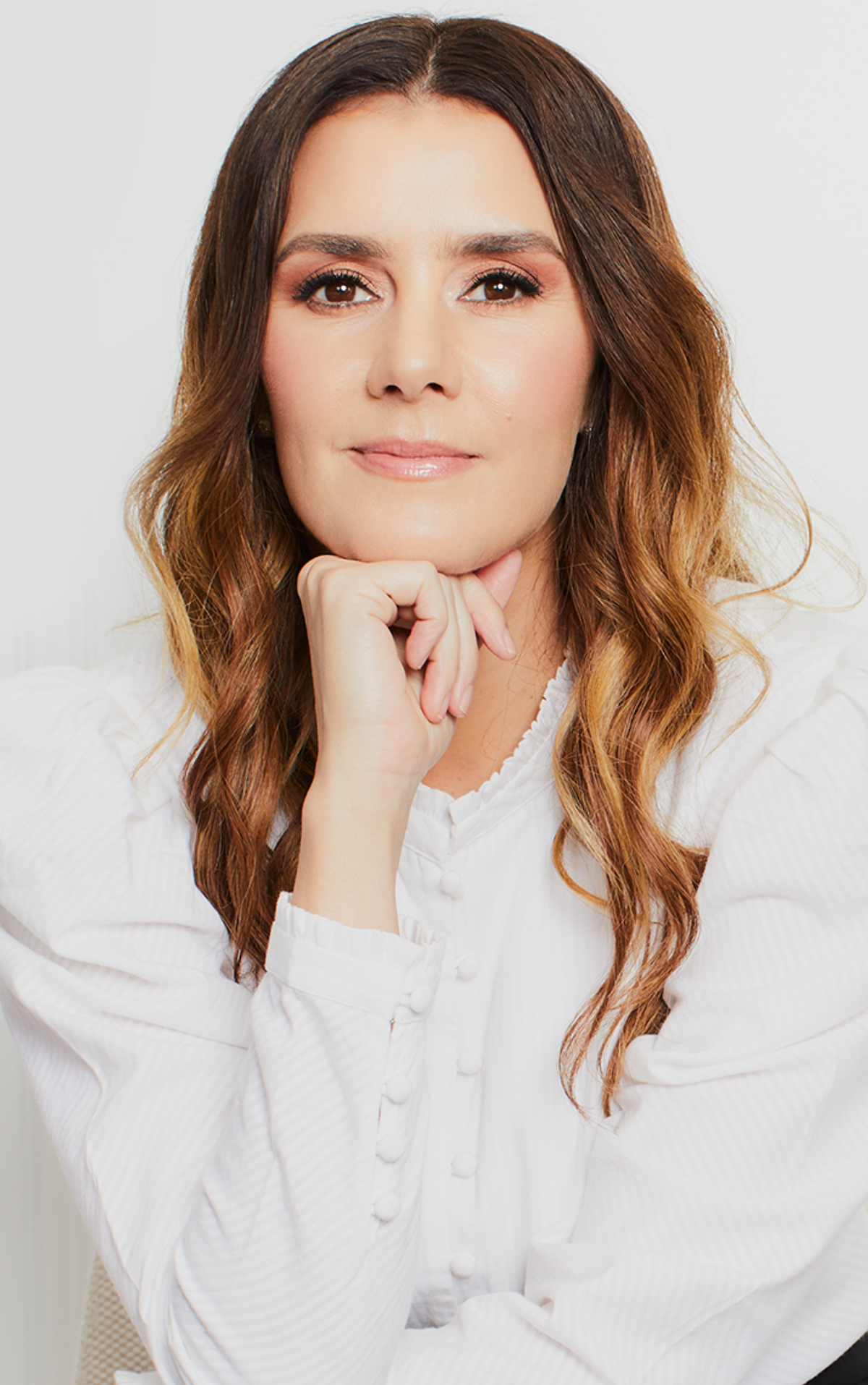
- Born: 15 August 1970 (age 56); Mexico City, Mexico
- Occupation: Author

Alejandra Llamas (born August 15, 1970) is a Mexican-American author, speaker, founder of the MMK Process and personal empowerment expert. She is the author of best-selling books El Arte de la Pareja, El Arte de Educar, Maestría de Vida, El Arte de Conocerte, Una Vida Sin Límites, Libérate and Esencia de Líder, published by Penguin RandomHouse. She is the founder of the MMK Institute, approved by the International Coach Federation.

== Biography ==
Alejandra Llamas was born on August 15, 1970, in Mexico City, Mexico to parents Cecilia Vidales, a psychologist, and Federico Llamas, a public accountant. In 1993, she received a degree in Textile Design from the Universidad Iberoamericana in Mexico City which exposed her to the world of art and design. In 1996, she started her first business, Modifica Art Gallery dedicated to design art. In 1999, Llamas moved to Miami, Florida, to work in the music business with RLM Management, managing prominent acts like Miguel Bosé, Mecano and Alejandro Sanz among others.

Difficulties in her personal life, the passing of her father, moving to a foreign country, and a divorce, led her to take up yoga and meditation. Her newfound interest in human behavior led her to get certified as an ontological coach in Minneapolis, Minnesota, in 2004. By 2006, after being certified as a yoga instructor in Santa Fe, New Mexico, by Tias Little, she became Director and CEO of her own center in Miami. During this period, she wanted to communicate her findings to a broader audience, and she began writing her reflections which ultimately became her first, best-selling book in Spanish, Una Vida Sin Límites (A Life Without Limits), published by Penguin/Random House in 2009.

In 2012, again through Penguin/Random House, she published her second book in Spanish El Arte de Conocerte, immediately followed in 2013 with its English language edition, The Art of Self-Awareness in which she discusses practical methods to achieve self-awareness. In early 2014, she co-authored the book Maestría de Vida ("Mastery in Life") with Hispanic media personality Gloria Calzada in which they discuss subjects such as trust, fear, love, happiness, self-esteem, ego, forgiveness, among others. In April 2014, she published her fourth book with Penguin/Random House entitled El arte de educar: Técnicas de coaching para guiar a nuestros hijos (Spanish Edition) ("The Art of Raising Children") where she introduces the reader to coaching techniques for raising children. She goes on to write El Arte de la Pareja, how to find your happiness through human relationships, Esencia de Líder, a journey to find your own greatness and Libérate, ways to heal what binds you and lead a limitless life. After 10 years, Alejandra Llamas publishes a new edition of her first book A Life Without Limits, becoming a best-seller in Mexico and the US.

Alejandra Llamas is currently a teacher and the creator of the MMK Process, based on ontological coaching, guided meditation, pillars of self, and other methods to achieve a higher level of consciousness and self-awareness. She creates, gives and directs the certification for the MMK Process through her own educational organization The MMK Institute, an organization that certifies people all over the world to become facilitators of the MMK Process. She is a frequent guest on television and radio programs discussing personal empowerment techniques and human behavior.

== Personal ==
Alejandra Llamas is married to Genaro Díaz, an entrepreneur and real estate investor. They have two children together: Patricio and Hana.
