= Alejandra Gutiérrez (actress) =

Venezuelan actress and model (born 1979)

- Born: Alejandra Gutiérrez; June 20, 1979 (age 45); Caracas, Venezuela
- Occupation(s): News Anchor, Model and actress
- Website: http://www.aleg.net/

Alejandra Gutiérrez (born June 20, 1979) is a Venezuelan actress and model. Born to a Venezuelan mother and a Spanish father, she grew up in Caracas and moved to Miami in 1996 to study dance. Starting in 1998, she has appeared in various movies and TV-series, mainly in US-based Spanish TV-channels, such as Miami Hoy. She may be best known to international audiences for her role in Carlita's Secret with Eva Longoria and was also featured in Nip/Tuck. She is a previous playmate for Playboy Latin America, and has modelled for brands such as Visa Card, McDonald's and Bell South.
