= Eugenia Vargas =

Chilean-American artist

Eugenia Vargas-Pereira (born 1949) is an artist. She was born in Chile and moved to the United States to study art. Vargas also traveled to other countries where she would practice and pursue her art career. Her main areas of study for art were performance and photography. She traveled to countries such as the United States, Mexico, Canada, and Puerto Rico.

== Biography ==
Eugenia Vargas was born in Chillan, Chile (1949). She expanded her education from Chile to the United States of America. Vargas continued her studies at the Montana Institute of Arts, where she would later have her own solo exhibition. Vargas also traveled to Mexico and other Latin American countries to display her artwork in other exhibitions. While in Mexico, her art and message were not well received. Members of the Consejo Mexicano de Fotografia did not acknowledge her work as photographs. After living in Mexico and displaying her art in several exhibitions throughout many Latin American countries she moved back to Chile in 2008. She was residing in Miami, Florida as of 2018.

== Career ==
Vargas career began with her first solo exhibition in Montana at the University Center Gallery. Her main forms of art are installations, photographs, videos, and performance where she discusses topics such as birth, life, feminism and environmentalism. Vargas uses the human body (nude) and other organic materials to create these pieces and is inspired by her personal connections to these issues that she witness growing up. Many of her works are done in a series for the sole purpose that it helps her organize and create the a narrative to get her point across. Her work has been displayed at the Hammer at UCLA, in Santa Cruz, various museums in California and Miami. As well as many exhibitions across Latin America, even Australia.

== Artwork ==
=== Las Chicas Buenas No Disparan, 2006 ===
This artwork is a series of photographs containing a woman in red with a gun. Being one of her most recent works her goal was to play with the way that women were depicted by creating new stereotypes of them. This work of art comes after a previous series she had created which also had a woman in red. As well as bringing light the play of stereotypes she also used weapons to evoke the conversation of the challenges and issues that guns have evoked. By combining both weapons and women she is able to create the discussion of the threat that women continuously deal with when it comes to violence. By placing the women in red articulates this sense of empowerment with the gun adding to it.

=== Untitled, Digital C-Print ===
This series is inspired from the story "Little Red Riding Hood" and other essays written by Tracy Williams. The essays spoke about the importance of fairytales and how they caution people through these made-up stories, about bigger issues. By placing her female subject in red to reference back to the Little Red Riding hood. Vargas's goal here is to bring light to the issues of cannibalism, abjection, and sexuality. Those same issues that she is displaying throughout the series were issues seen in the fairytale of the Little Red Riding Hood.

== Collections ==
Vargas' work is in the collection of the Hammer Museum at UCLA, and the San Antonio Museum of Art.

== Solo exhibitions ==
- 1985 Re-tratos, Museo de Historia, Antropología y Arte, Universidad de Puerto Rico, San Juan
- 1990 Eugenia Vargas: Gran Formato, Galería de Arte Contemporáneo, México
- 1991 Aguas, University Art Museum, California State University, Long Beach
- 1996 Poder de actos de dominio irrevocable, Milagros Art Gallery, San Antonio, TX
- 1998 Abject Body. Miami-Dade Community College Center Gallery, Miami, FL
- 2002 Eugenia Vargas: The Longest Day of the Year, Ambrosino Gallery, Miami

== Bibliography ==
1. Vargas, Eugenia, and Pont D. C. Du. Eugenia Vargas. Long Beach, CA: University Art Museum, California State University Long Beach, 1991. Print.
2. Vargas, Eugenia. [eugenia Vargas., n.d.. Archival material.
3. Vargas, Eugenia, and Tami Katz-Freiman. The Abject Body: A Site-Specific Installation. Miami, Fla.: Miami-Dade Community College, 1999. Print.
4. Vargas, Eugenia. Centric 45: [exhibition] October 15-December 15, 1991 ... the University Art Museum, California State University, Long Beach. Long Beach, Calif: Art Museum & Galleries, 1991. Print.
5. Conger, Amy, and Elena Poniatowska. Compañeras de México: Women Photograph Women. Riverside, CA: University Art Gallery, University of California, 1990.
6. Vargas, Eugenia. Eugenia Vargas: Fotografías E Instalación. México, D.F: Galeria Arte Contemporaneo, 1992. Print.
7. Fajardo-Hill, Cecilia, Andrea Giunta, and Rodrigo Alonso. Radical Women: Latin American Art, 1960-1985, 2017. Print.
