= Mariale =

Venezuelan internet personality and YouTuber

- Born: Marialejandra Marrero; Caracas, Venezuela
- Other names: Mariale; Mar; Makeuplocalypse; MarialeSinPatuque
- Occupation: YouTuber

YouTube information
- Channel: Mariale
- Years active: 2010–present
- Genres: Beauty; comedy; vlogs; lifestyle; motivation
- Subscribers: 15.2 million
- Views: 3.08 billion
- Last updated: October 20, 2025

Marialejandra Marrero, better known as Mariale, is a Venezuelan internet personality and YouTuber residing in Los Angeles, California. She is better known for hosting and producing the YouTube channels Mariale, SinPatuque, Mar ♥. She has a combined following of more than 21 million people just on YouTube.

== Internet career ==
Mariale started her YouTube career in January 2010 when she uploaded her first video to her YouTube Channel Makeuplocalypse, now known as Mariale. As of November 2023 she has uploaded more than 2,900 videos to this channel and has accumulated more than 15.1 million unique followers and more than 2.9 billion of total views.

In January 2011, Mariale started SinPatuque (meaning without makeup in Venezuelan slang), a personal vlog-style channel which slowly transitioned into its current daily vlogs form. As of November 2023, she has uploaded more than 400 videos to her channel and has accumulated more than 3.6 million followers and 330 million total views.

In November 2015, Mariale uploaded her first video in English to her newest channel, Mar ♥. As of November 2023, she has uploaded more than 850 videos to this channel and has accumulated more than 2.3 million unique followers and more than 286 million total views.

In April 2017, she launched her own lipstick line called "Mariale".

In August 2018, Mariale was the official Image of Smashbox Cosmetics' new collection "Ablaze" in all the ULTA stores around the world. Later that October, she launched her own E-clothing store called "Club Mar".

In September 2020, Mariale launched a makeup palette in collaboration with beauty brand Too Faced called Amor Caliente.

In November 2022, Mariale launched a makeup collection in collaboration with beauty brand Colourpop called Ctrl+Alt+Glam.

Mariale also holds a Bachelor of Science in Biology degree from Universidad Simón Bolívar.

=== Social media ===
As of November 2023, she has more than 6 million followers on Instagram, more than 3 million followers on Facebook, more than 1 million followers on Twitter, and more than 4.7 million followers on TikTok. This brings her total social media reach to more than 34 million followers.

== Awards ==
Mariale has been recognized by YouTube for her success with 6 different YouTube Play Buttons. A Silver Play button for reaching 100,000 subscribers in her Mariale, SinPatuque and Mar YouTube channels, as well as 3 Gold Play buttons for reaching 1 million followers in Mariale, SinPatuque and Mar and one Diamond button for reaching 10 million in Mariale.

In 2016 she received the Venezuelan Cacique de Oro award for best Venezuelan Influencer.

In 2022 Mariale was voted as winner in the CEW Beauty Creator Awards in the "Influencer of the year" category. She was also named one of Hola! magazine's Top 100 Latina Powerhouse in the Beauty category.

In 2023 she won an award for Content Powerhouse at Ipsy's "Ipsies Beauty and Creator awards".
