= Juana Lecaros =

Chilean visual artist (1920–1993)

Juanita Lecaros
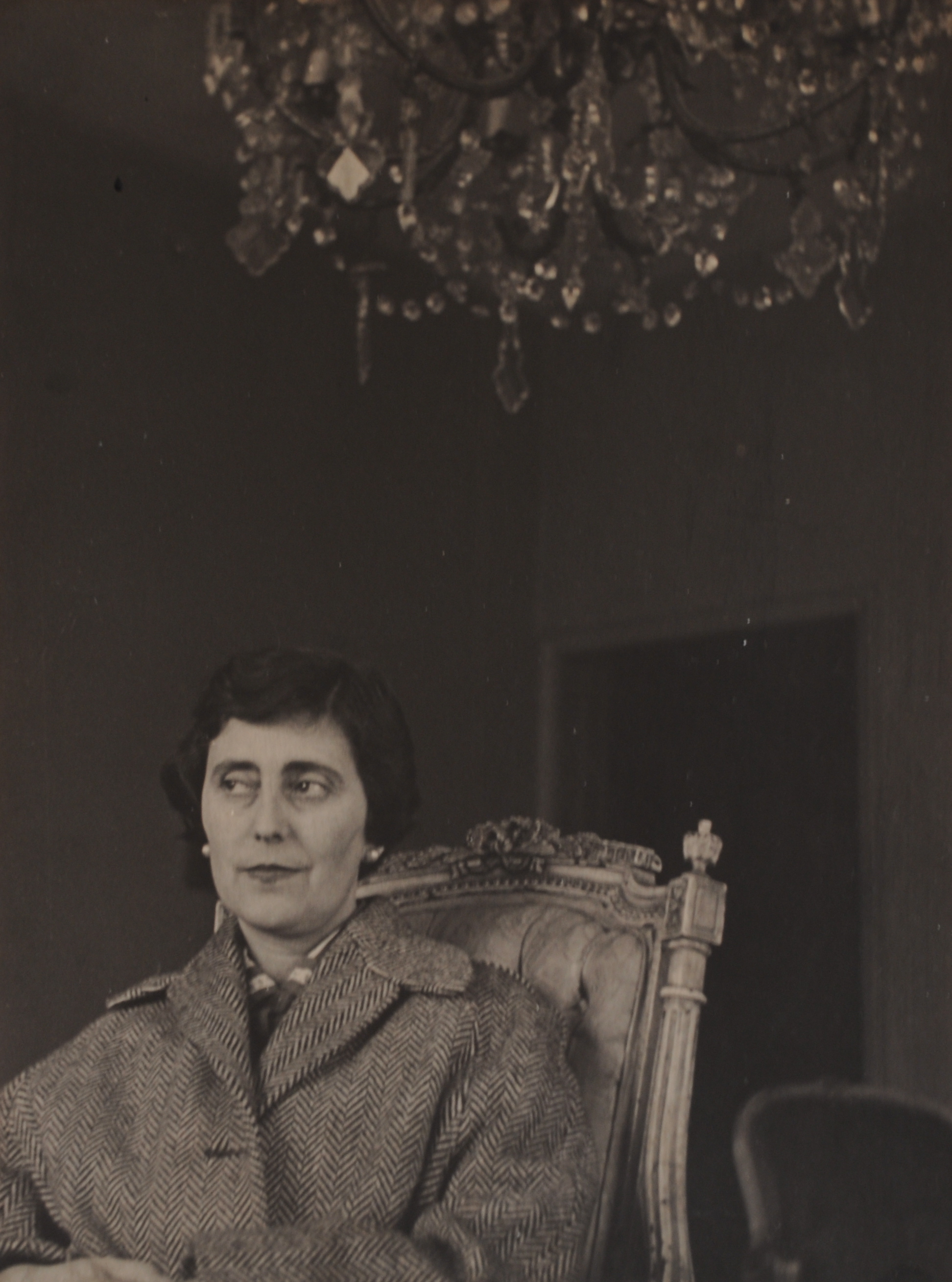
- Born: Juanita Lecaros Izquierdo; August 20, 1920; Santiago, Chile
- Died: May 2, 1993 (aged 72); Santiago, Chile
- Other names: J. M Sorcale
- Occupation(s): Painter, printmaker, engraver, poet, writer

Juanita Lecaros Izquierdo (1920 – 1993) Chilean visual artist and poet. She is known for her paintings, and engravings. Lecaros used the pseudonym J. M. Sorcale for writing her poetry.

== Biography ==
She studied art at the University of Chile between 1949 and 1953, where she was a student of Gustavo Carrasco in drawing, Laureano Ladrón de Guevara in mural painting and Eduardo Martínez Bonati in engraving. She also took printmaking classes at Taller 99 with Bonati. While attending university, she was a member of the "Grupo de Estudiantes Plásticos". Although Lecaros never traveled abroad, her works were exhibited in the United States, Brazil, and Italy. In parallel, she wrote poetry which she signed under the pseudonym J. M. Sorcale.

Her work can be found in the museum collections at the Museum of Modern Art.

== See also ==
- List of Chilean women artists
