= María Alejandra =

María Alejandra or Marialejandra is a Hispanic feminine given name that may refer to

- María Alejandra Bravo (born 1961), Mexican biochemist
- María Alejandra Guzmán (born 1984), Dominican TV and radio hostess, actress and model
- María Alejandra Idrobo (born 1988), Colombian sprinter
- Marialejandra Marrero (born 1991), Venezuelan internet personality
- Marialejandra Martín (born 1964), Venezuelan actress
- Maria Alejandra Quintanilla (born 1990), musical artist
- Maria Alejandra Royo, Panamanian model and beauty pageant titleholder
- María Alejandra Tucat (born 1961), Argentinean field hockey player
- Maria Alejandra Vengoechea, Colombian model and beauty pageant titleholder
- María Alejandra Vicuña (born 1978), Vice President of Ecuador

== See also ==
- MV María Alejandra, a Spanish oil tanker built in 1975
