= Soledad Salamé =

Chilean artist (born 1954)

Soledad Salamé (born 1954) is a Chilean artist, known for her multimedia installations, which focus on the connection between art, science, nature, and technology.

Salamé lives in Baltimore, Maryland, where she is the managing director and founder of Sol Print Studios.

== Early life and education ==
Soledad Salamé was born in Santiago, Chile in 1954. She attended Santiago College where she received her B.A. in Fine Arts in 1972. Salamé continued her education in 1973 at the Sucre Technological Institute for Industrial and Graphic Design and in 1975-76 attended the Neumann Foundation Design Institute in Caracas, Venezuela. After receiving a Certificate in Making Paper by Hand from the Center for Education in Graphic Arts in 1978, Salamé obtained a M.A., from the Graphic Arts Institute for Graphic Instruction at CONAC, in Caracas, Venezuela, in 1979.

== Career ==
Soledad Salame’s career began in Venezuela where she was influenced by the natural elements of her environment, particularly the Amazon Rainforest. This interest in the natural world can be seen in much of her work spanning the entirety of her career.

=== Sundials ===
Salamé’s first major project in 1983 was a comment on the energy of the sun and the movement of time in relation to the environment. This series of three large scale sculptures is made of a variety of found materials. Residing in the Sculpture Park at the Mines of Simon Bolvier, the piece entitled Sundial features a large stone, while Universal Structure, is made up of stacked and layered steel, along with elements of brass and bronze; this sculpture is also placed within a natural environment. In the technological piece entitled Three Eras, Salamé uses brightly-colored rubber, steel, and plexiglass. The sundial is a working piece that moves in relation to the Sun and is strategically placed near the El Avila mountain just outside of Caracas, Venezuela.

=== Baltimore Opera Company ===
Salamé continued her career once she moved to the United States. In 1990, she embarked on a new project with the Baltimore Opera Company where she became the set designer for a production of Carmen, which received glowing reviews. The Baltimore Sun stated, “Salamé gave the audience a kaleidoscope feast of reds, yellows, browns, and blues in painting and sculptures capturing at different depths, windows or city lights or precipices or buildings. Salamé sent the viewers imagination roaming as the Bizet melodies splashed over them.”

=== Paintings ===
The paintings of Salamé have been described as a unique style of abstract expressionism, combining recognizable imagery with dream-like surrealism. These qualities are evident in the series of paintings done in the early to mid-1990s. An example of this technique can be seen in her 1994 painting Interior I. This painting features structural elements of interior spaces such as corridors and stairways combined with a hazy color palette which enhances a viewing experience that transcends time and space. In the 1995 piece, City of Secrets, Salamé once again uses the fragmented, abstract style seen in her earlier work. In each section of this composition the textural components of mixed media enhance its mysterious beauty, along with the strategic use of dark and light colors, adding intensity to the overall emotional expression of the work.

=== Garden of the Sacred Light ===
The installation, Garden of the Sacred Light, 1994, constructed of wood and glass, featuring grass, plants, and soil was featured in the traveling exhibition, Latin American Women Artists 1915-1994. The sculptural piece adorned with actual living plants embodies an ecological message of the evolution of art and nature.

=== Amber ===
The Amber (resin series), a medium Salamé created herself and began working with in 2001, features Salamé's investigative studies of the natural world. Inspired by her interest in ecology of water systems, this series takes a scientific approach to the smallest elements of the natural world. In these pieces Salamé has embedded small detailed drawings of insects and foliage into the layers of amber. These drawings are frozen in time where the translucent amber allows light to pass through, highlighting the fragile skeletal details of the decomposing life forms.

=== Growth ===
The installation, Growth, features two sections of grass emerging from dried hay. The organic materials evolve into handmade paper which is embellished with poetry and drawings of trees. The evolution of time in relation to the natural world are themes featured in this installations.

=== Labyrinth of Solitude ===
The 2001 installation Labyrinth of Solitude was created in response to the high levels of mercury found in the Tapojos River, one of the largest tributaries of the Amazon. Located in the atrium of the Museum of Fine Arts in Santiago, Chile, this large scale installation is a cumulation of Salamé's career as an artist thus far. The immensely long architectural piece encourages engagement from the viewer and emulates light, highlighting the detail of small-scale environments within the piece. Natural elements of insects, hay, resin, and geodes are all incorporated to unify in the installation. The entire piece is a narrative commenting on the evolution of humanity and our impact on nature. Salamé used a multitude of media to create the installation, including her drawings, large floating and illuminated plates of amber, natural elements of light and shadow and a plethora of organic materials.

=== Agua Fluida and Agua Vivas ===
A reoccurring theme in Salamè’s work is the element of water. She began work studying rivers and water ways by depicting them using a variety of media in an attempt to capture the ever changing movements. The paintings, Amber River Triptych and Rapids, 2004, were the foundational works for her installations featuring the subject of water. In the 2005 exhibit, Agua Fluida, at Goya Contemporary in Baltimore, Maryland, Salamé expands upon the subject of water by adding the element of movement. The project featured large-scale wall sized lenticular light boxes giving these abstract images an element of reality. The illusion of fluidity and movement is achieved by using this new form of visual imagery. In the 2006 exhibit, Aguas Vivas at the Museo Bellas Artes in Santiago, Chile, Salamé further explores the subject of water through different media. The most notable installation within the exhibit is Antarctic Reflections which was done in graphite and acrylic on Mylar. The piece is based on the glacial landscapes of Antarctica spanning an entire wall, enhancing the horizontal perspective.

=== Islands, Atmospheres, Barcodes and Where Do You Live? ===
Salamé has intently studied the natural world in a variety of places including the Amazon Rainforest, Antarctica, and the Maryland coast near her home. The focus of her ecological research is evident in her artwork and has evolved to include the study of human impact on the environment. The influence of global warming and climate change on the Earth’s water sources, lakes, rivers, oceans can be seen in My Precious Island (2009), Atmospheres in Blue (2010), and the installation Where do you live?: Three Thousand Miles of Maryland Coastline (2009) where she uses satellite, infrared, and weather imagery as a visual language to illustrate coastline depletion and changing weather patterns. In the series Barcodes (2010), technology is not only the tool but the focus of the work. These works consist of metal panels silkscreened with images of islands overlaid with digital barcode patterns which distort the images. The islands become an abstracted image and draw attention to the role of technology in our changing environments. The barcode represents readable data and how this form of communication is the technological form of DNA found in natural life forms. The intensity of the electric green color further enhances the contradictory dynamics of the conflicts between nature and technology.

== Sol Print Studios ==
Salamé has continued her work within the art world through Sol Print Studios which she founded in 2009. The studio, located within her home in Baltimore, Maryland, offers weekend- long intensive workshops for small groups teaching the highly detailed printing technique of solar plate etching. The residency workshops are small, giving Salamé an opportunity to work one-on-one with each student. Sol Print Studios has evolved to include workshops in other printing techniques including encaustic, chine collé (a type of printed collage), and embossing.

== Publications ==
Salamé’s work has been represented in many publications including, Contemporary Museum: 20 years, by Irene Hoffman (2011), The St. James Guide to Hispanic Artists, by Thomas Riggs (2002), Latin American Women Artists of the United States, by Robert Henkes (1999), and Latin American Art in the Twentieth Century, by Edward J. Sullivan (1996).
