= Alejandra Peña =

Venezuelan politician

Ana Medina

Alternate deputy for the National Assembly of Venezuela
- Incumbent
- Assumed office 5 January 2016
- Constituency: Circuit 1 of Barinas state

Personal details
- Occupation: Politician

Alejandra Peña is a Venezuelan politician, currently an alternate deputy for the National Assembly for the Barinas state.

== Career ==
She was elected as alternate deputy for the National Assembly for the Barinas state for the 2016–2021 term in the 2015 parliamentary elections, representing the Democratic Unity Roundtable (MUD). Peña was among the deputies who voted, as alternate for deputy Maribel Guédez, to ratify Juan Guaidó as president of the National Assembly in the 2020 Assembly Delegate Commission election.

== See also ==
- IV National Assembly of Venezuela
