= Astrid Alcayaga =

Cuban-Chilean artist (born 1974)

- Born: Astrid Alcayaga; March 1, 1974; Havana, Cuba
- Occupation: Visual artist
- Known for: Abstract Expressionist painting, Art photography
- Notable work: Black And White series, Abstraction series
- Movement: Contemporary Cuban art, Chilean art, Abstract expressionism

Astrid Alcayaga (born 1974, Havana, Cuba) is a Cuban-Chilean visual artist whose work combines elements of abstraction, figurative painting, symbolism and Abstract Expressionism. Working primarily in painting and mixed media, her practice explores themes of memory, identity, fragmentation and the contemporary female experience through layered surfaces, gestural mark-making and textured compositions.

Since establishing her career in the United States in 2005, Alcayaga has exhibited extensively in solo and group exhibitions throughout the United States, Chile and Spain. Her work has been presented at venues internationally including the Museo La Celestina in La Puebla de Montalbán, Spain, the Gran Logia de Chile in Santiago, CubaOcho Art and Research Center during Miami Art Week, and numerous galleries associated with Miami's contemporary art community. Her paintings are included in the Rodríguez Collection of the Museum of Contemporary Art of the Americas (MoCA Americas) and in private collections in the United States, Switzerland, France, Spain and Latin America. Her work has been covered in several media publications including El Nuevo Herald, Miami Herald, Diario Las Américas, and Radio Martí.

== Early life and background ==
Astrid Alcayaga was born March 1, 1974, in the Vedado neighborhood of Havana, Cuba into a family of Chilean ancestry. In 1993, she settled in Santiago, Chile where she first began to paint professionally until relocating permanently to the United States in 2005, establishing her artistic practice in South Florida.

Although largely self-taught as a painter, Alcayaga has described growing up in an environment in which artistic expression formed a natural part of daily life. Her father, Ariel Augusto Alcayaga Aldunate, studied fine arts in Cuba, and had a strong influence on her artistic development while music, theatre, dance, poetry and visual art also collectively shaped her early creative development.

Rather than pursuing formal academic training in painting, she developed her practice independently through sustained experimentation and research, later identifying this autodidactic process as central to the evolution of her artistic language. Among the artists who influenced and supported the development of her work are the Cuban painters Josignacio and Sergio Payares, whose guidance and professional mentorship Alcayaga has credited with contributing to the refinement of her approach to contemporary painting. She also became connected to several other noted and supportive Cuban painters in exile, such as Tomás Esson and Noel Santiesteban, while expanding her professional network and artistic presence.

Alcayaga has also acknowledged the influence of childhood experiences on her mature work. She has cited memories of assisting a caretaker who assembled quilts from small fragments of fabric as the conceptual origin of her long-running exploration of fragmentation, layering and memory. These recollections later became the structural basis for her Ropa Vieja ("Old Clothes") series, in which individual painted segments function as visual metaphors for accumulated experiences and personal identity.

== Career ==
After relocating to the United States in 2005, Alcayaga became active within South Florida's expanding contemporary art scene, exhibiting regularly in Miami galleries and alternative exhibition spaces during the late 2000s. Early exhibitions included presentations at Renee Gallery, Red Bar Gallery, Zu Gallery, Pure Art Miami Beach, Artopia Art Center in Wynwood, Ivan Galindo Gallery, Miguel Rodez Art Projects, and the Art & Design Market in Wynwood.

Her first significant solo exhibitions introduced themes that would continue throughout her later work, particularly investigations into memory, identity and abstraction. Among these were By the Ways of Lola at DAF Studio (2008) and On the Paths of Lola at SouMe SoU Space (2009), exhibitions that explored autobiographical narratives through increasingly expressive painterly surfaces.

Beginning in 2012, Alcayaga's exhibition schedule expanded considerably as she participated in numerous exhibitions associated with Miami's internationally recognized Art Basel cultural programming. She exhibited in group exhibitions including Enigma during Art Basel Miami, United by Zhayr, United for Art, A Woman's Perspective, and Communications at TA Project Gallery. These exhibitions established her presence within the city's multicultural contemporary art community and introduced her work to broader audiences.

During this period, Alcayaga also developed several series that examined the expressive potential of monochromatic painting. Her Black and White Art Design works emphasized texture, gesture and materiality while deliberately restricting the chromatic palette. The series was exhibited in multiple solo exhibitions, including presentations at Euro Suites Hotel (2013), Futurama 1637 Galleries (2014), Open Stage Coral Gables (2018), and was later the subject of critical discussion in Nagari Magazine, which highlighted the relationship between abstraction, emotional expression and architectural surface within the paintings.

Another notable theme and influence that was expressed in this period was that of actor Charlie Chaplin. This was publicly introduced in her 2013 solo exhibition Be Art Series, held in the Euro Suite Hotel, and which Alcayaga organized to also include other multimedia elements connecting the black and white concept to Chaplin's emblematic association with the Golden Age of Hollywood and the silent film age. These included multidisciplinary performances featuring by mime artist Leandro Peraza, actress and theater director Marisela del Carmen Espinosa, and writer Yosie Crespo. Chaplin would become a continuing influence on future work and projects by Alcayaga.

In December of 2013, Alcayaga was selected as one of the artists to participate in the Paraguas de La Pequeña Habana public art installation, noted for being the first formal art project held in Little Havana for Art Basel Miami. The installation was also part of official programing for the Viernes Culturales series of Little Havana.

=== Emergence as an international exhibiting artist ===
By the mid-2010s, Alcayaga's exhibition program increasingly extended beyond regional gallery spaces. In 2015 she presented Modern Communication, a solo exhibition at the Gran Logia de Chile in Santiago. Organized within the institution's Marco Bontá exhibition hall, the exhibition was accompanied by public programming and received formal recognition from the hosting Masonic Lodge, which commended both the quality of the exhibition and the artist's engagement with visitors. This exhibition also featured work influenced by Charlie Chaplin. The same year, Alcayaga presented an exhibition at the Home Design and Remodeling Show at the Miami Beach Convention Center, introducing her work to audiences beyond the traditional gallery setting while participating in one of South Florida's largest design and cultural events. The event was covered by Sun Sentinel.

A significant milestone followed in 2016 with Moon Woman – Figurative Abstraction, a solo exhibition at Vargas Gallery in Miami organized in collaboration with the Art Department of Vargas University and curated by Cuban art historian and curator Henry Ballate.

Ballate situated Alcayaga's work within the broader historical tradition of Abstract Expressionism, drawing particular attention to her reinterpretation of techniques associated with Jackson Pollock while emphasizing the distinctive role of figuration within her paintings. Rather than treating the female figure as subject matter, Ballate argued that Alcayaga positioned the woman as creator, employing gestural abstraction to investigate emotional and psychological experience through layered painterly construction. The exhibition represented an important stage in the maturation of Alcayaga's artistic language and contributed to broader critical attention surrounding her work and received coverage from El Nuevo Herald. It also featured a performance with actors Nirma del Rio and Julio Cesar Almaguer, who paid tribute Alcayaga's artistic career by painting and live dancing during the exhibition opening.

Following the presentation of Moon Woman – Figurative Abstraction in 2016, Alcayaga continued to expand the scope of her exhibition activity while further refining the relationship between abstraction and figuration that had become characteristic of her work. Her paintings increasingly emphasized layered surfaces, gestural mark-making and fragmented compositional structures, reflecting an ongoing investigation into memory, perception and emotional experience.

Later that year she presented Figurative Abstraction, a solo exhibition at the House of Movement Mansion in the Brickell area of downtown Miami under the auspices of Hom Miami Art Gallery. The exhibition further explored the visual vocabulary developed in Moon Woman, bringing together paintings in which recognizable forms emerge gradually from energetic abstract fields rather than being directly depicted. Critics noted the tension between representation and abstraction as one of the defining qualities of her mature work. The exhibition also featured works inspired by Chaplin and its opening reception was attended by actor and Charlie Chaplin impressionist Olber Vargas as well as television directors Yaky Ortega and María Elena Páez.

In 2017 Alcayaga presented the solo exhibition Profiles at Art Emporium Miami. The exhibition examined portraiture through increasingly abstract means, employing layered textures, gestural brushwork and fragmented forms in place of conventional likeness. Rather than presenting literal representations, the paintings explored psychological presence and emotional identity, reflecting a broader shift within her practice toward symbolic rather than descriptive imagery. In 2017, Alcayaga also gave remarks at the Anuario XVIII Revista Literaria held in the Centro Cultural Español de Miami (Spanish Cultural Center of Miami) which included a digital-multimedia solo exhibition of her work and concluded with Alacayaga presenting an original work of hers that subsequently entered the Center's permanent collection. Other event speakers included poets María de las Nieves Morales Cardoso and Carlos I. Naranjo Pacheco and writer Delia Fiallo.

Her exhibition activity continued in 2018 with Black and White, a solo presentation at Open Stage Coral Gables. Building upon an earlier monochromatic series, the exhibition emphasized the expressive possibilities of texture, contrast and materiality. By eliminating color, Alcayaga focused attention on the physical construction of the painted surface, allowing compositional rhythm and layered gesture to assume greater prominence.

=== International exhibitions ===
Alcayaga's work has been exhibited internationally in both solo and group exhibitions in the United States, Chile and Spain.

One of the most significant international presentations occurred in 2019, when she participated in a collective exhibition at Museo La Celestina in La Puebla de Montalbán, Toledo, Spain. The exhibition formed part of the museum's contemporary art programming and brought together artists from several countries. Coverage in La Tribuna de Toledo situated the exhibition within the cultural activities surrounding the historic municipality while acknowledging the participation of international contemporary artists.

Her exhibition history also includes numerous presentations associated with Miami's multicultural arts community, including exhibitions at CubaOcho Art and Research Center, Miami Hispanic Cultural Arts Center, Spanish Cultural Center of Miami (CCEMiami, North Miami Beach Library, TA Project Gallery, Hom Miami Art Gallery, Luda Gallery, Vargas University, Art Emporium Miami and other institutions active during Miami Art Week and related cultural events.

Between 2007 and 2019 Alcayaga maintained a sustained exhibition schedule that included more than twenty solo exhibitions in addition to numerous juried, invitational and collective exhibitions throughout Florida, Georgia, Chile, and Spain.

== Artistic practice ==
Although primarily recognized as a painter, Alcayaga's work incorporates elements of mixed media through the physical layering of paint, texture and structural surfaces. Her practice occupies a space between abstraction, symbolism and figurative painting, while drawing upon aspects of Abstract Expressionism, Action Painting and contemporary gestural abstraction.

Throughout her career she has consistently explored memory as a constructive rather than documentary process. Rather than depicting specific autobiographical events, her paintings employ fragments, repeated forms and accumulated layers to suggest the manner in which identity develops through lived experience. This emphasis on memory has become one of the central conceptual frameworks of her practice.

Writing about her work, Alcayaga has described painting as "a way of writing without words," characterizing each composition as an evolving visual language through which memories, emotions and imagination intersect. She has rejected the notion of the canvas as a flat pictorial surface, instead describing it as a living space in which successive layers preserve traces of experience while remaining open to reinterpretation by viewers.

Rather than producing narrative imagery, Alcayaga frequently allows recognizable figures or symbolic forms to emerge gradually from gestural abstraction. This ambiguity invites multiple readings of individual works while resisting fixed iconographic interpretation.

=== Influences ===
Alcayaga has identified the development of Abstract Expressionism as an important influence on her work, particularly the gestural techniques associated with Action Painting. While acknowledging the impact of Jackson Pollock, she has emphasized that her interest lies less in formal imitation than in adapting gestural painting to explore memory and psychological experience.

Unlike many historical practitioners of Abstract Expressionism, whose work often eliminated figuration altogether, Alcayaga consistently retains figurative references within her paintings. These forms frequently appear partially concealed beneath successive layers of paint, functioning as visual remnants rather than explicit representations. Art historian and curator Henry Ballate has argued that this synthesis distinguishes Alcayaga's work from earlier Abstract Expressionist traditions by positioning figurative abstraction not as a transitional phase toward pure abstraction, but as the defining structure of her artistic language.

Alcayaga has acknowledged the influence of Pollock and Cuban artist Sergio Payares, whose guidance contributed to the evolution of her visual vocabulary during the formative stages of her career, and media coverage has also noted the influence of silent film actor Charlie Chaplin and her Cuban and Chilean heritage, including Cuban illustrator Conrado Walter Massaguer and Chilean ancestry.

=== Major series ===
==== Ropa Vieja ====
Among Alcayaga's best-known bodies of work is Ropa Vieja ("Old Clothes"), a series inspired by childhood memories of assembling patchwork quilts from small pieces of fabric. Rather than functioning as literal representations of textiles, the paintings employ repeated geometric fragments as metaphors for memory, identity and accumulated experience.

The series marks a significant turning point within her career by establishing fragmentation as a conceptual principle rather than merely a compositional device. Individual painted sections retain their autonomy while simultaneously contributing to larger unified structures, reflecting the artist's understanding of identity as an accumulation of lived experiences. Though largely abstract, series would also sometimes incorporate mixed media imagery, such as of Chaplin.

==== Black and White Art Design ====
The Black and White Art Design series, also referred to as the Black and White series, investigates the expressive possibilities of monochromatic painting. By restricting the palette to black, white and tonal variations, Alcayaga emphasizes texture, gesture and compositional rhythm while minimizing the descriptive function of color.

Critics have observed that the series shifts attention toward the physical qualities of the painted surface, encouraging viewers to engage with subtle variations in density, transparency and material accumulation.

==== Abstraction series ====
The Abstraction series represents Alcayaga's most direct engagement with gestural painting. Characterized by energetic brushwork, layered color fields and expressive textures, these paintings extend the conceptual concerns present throughout her earlier work while allowing greater compositional freedom.

Although the paintings frequently approach non-objective abstraction, traces of recognizable forms remain embedded within the compositions, reflecting the artist's continued interest in the intersection of memory, perception and imagination.

==== Memory Fragments ====
The later Memory Fragments series synthesizes many of the themes that have characterized Alcayaga's career. Employing layered textures, fragmented structures and symbolic abstraction, the paintings examine memory as a continually evolving process rather than a fixed record of the past. The series further develops her long-standing exploration of how emotional experience can be translated into visual form through accumulated painterly gestures rather than narrative representation.

== Style and analysis ==
Art historians and critics have generally situated Alcayaga's work at the intersection of Abstract Expressionism, symbolic figuration, and contemporary mixed-media painting. While her paintings often employ the gestural vocabulary associated with Action Painting, they typically retain lyrical traces of recognizable forms, figures, or symbolic structures that emerge from layered abstract fields.

A recurring feature of her practice is the use of fragmentation as a structural principle. Rather than treating the canvas as a unified image from the outset, Alcayaga frequently constructs compositions through accumulations of smaller visual units, layered textures, and overlapping gestures. This approach reflects her stated interest in memory as an assemblage of experiences rather than a linear narrative. Her series Ropa Vieja exemplifies this method. Inspired by childhood memories of assembling patchwork quilts, the works use repeated geometric fragments to suggest the way personal identity is formed through the accumulation of memories, emotions, and lived experiences. Individual elements retain a degree of autonomy while simultaneously contributing to a larger compositional whole.

In contrast, the Black and White Art Design series restricts the palette to monochromatic tonalities, shifting attention toward texture, density, transparency, and material surface. Critics have observed that the reduction of color intensifies the viewer's awareness of gesture and spatial construction, allowing subtle variations in light and shadow to become primary expressive devices. Her later Abstraction and Memory Fragments series expand these concerns through increasingly open compositions in which color, texture, and gesture operate with greater freedom. Although the paintings often approach non-objective abstraction, residual figurative references remain embedded within the surfaces, creating what some commentators have described as a continual oscillation between recognition and ambiguity.

Alcayaga has described painting as "writing without words," emphasizing the capacity of visual form to communicate experiences that resist direct verbal expression. Rather than seeking a single fixed interpretation, she has stated that her work is intended to remain open to multiple readings, allowing viewers to complete the meaning of a painting through their own memories and associations.

In addition to her painted works on canvas and paper, Alcayaga has also produced three-dimensional sculpture and mixed media works, as well as large scale murals, some of which have been used as public art.

== Coverage ==
Alcayaga's artwork and exhibitions have received coverage in newspapers, magazines, cultural journals, and online art publications in the United States, Spain, and Latin America. Her career has been featured in several English and Spanish language media outlets internationally, including the Miami Herald, Diario Las Américas, El Nuevo Herald, Sun Sentinel, Martí Noticias, Nagari Magazine, Arte Sólido, Baquiana, Artweek, and La Tribuna de Toledo have featured her exhibitions or discussed aspects of her artistic practice, as well as the radio network Radio Martí.

=== Critical reception ===
Reviews of Alcayaga's work have frequently emphasized the synthesis of abstraction and figuration within her paintings, particularly the manner in which gestural surfaces coexist with symbolic imagery. Writers have also noted the autobiographical dimensions of her work while identifying memory, identity and emotional transformation as well as the contemporary female experience as recurring themes throughout her artistic production, spanning across multiple series.

Curator Henry Ballate has situated Alcayaga within a broader lineage of Abstract Expressionism while emphasizing the originality of her sustained integration of figurative structures into gestural abstraction. Rather than treating abstraction as an end in itself, Ballate argues that Alcayaga employs it as a means of articulating emotional experience through layered painterly construction. Ballate posited that this sustained integration of figurative structures into gestural abstraction distinguishes her work from earlier traditions that moved toward complete non-figuration. He also highlights her vantagepoint as a woman in interpreting Abstract Expressionism beyond its often male-dominated traditional narratives, placing her in a more contemporary "genderless" context than the historically overlooked midcentury Abstract Expressionist female artists had been seen as.

Nagari Magazine, discussing her Black and White series, highlighted the expressive role of texture and materiality in constructing psychological rather than descriptive spaces. Arte Sólido characterized her work as occupying a distinctive position between contemporary abstraction and symbolic figuration, while Martí Noticias examined the relationship between her Cuban origins, Chilean heritage and artistic development in the United States.

== Exhibitions ==
Alcayaga has participated in solo and collective exhibitions in Miami, Atlanta, Coral Gables, and Miami Beach as well as internationally in Chile and Spain. Her work has been shown in galleries, museums, libraries, universities, and cultural centers alongside the work of other noted artists and contemporaries including Rafael Consuegra, Zaida del Rio, and Xavier Cortada. She has participated in exhibitions in several notable art events such as Art Basel Miami Beach, venues including the Miami Beach Convention Center, Miami International Airport, the Four Ambassadors Hotel, the Círculo de Periodistas of Santiago, Chile and the Masonic Grand Lodge of Chile, as well as noted cultural hubs such as the Wynwood Art District, Brickell, Little Havana, and the Bird Road Arts District (BRAD).

=== Selected solo exhibitions ===
- 2008, By the Ways of Lola, DAF Studio, Miami FL
- 2009, On the Paths of Lola, SouMe SoU Space, Miami FL
- 2013, Ropa Vieja, Go Modern, Miami FL
- 2013, Black and White, Be Art Series, Miami FL
- 2014, Black and White Art Design Recycled, Futurama 1637 Galleries, Miami FL
- 2015, Meeting Point, Luda Gallery, Miami FL
- 2015, Modern Communication, Gran Logia de Chile, Santiago, Chile
- 2016, Moon Woman – Figurative Abstraction, Vargas Gallery, Vargas University, Miami FL
- 2016, Figurative Abstraction, Hom Miami Art Gallery, Miami FL
- 2017, Profiles, Art Emporium Miami, Miami FL
- 2018, Black and White, Open Stage Coral Gables, Coral Gables FL

=== Selected group exhibitions ===
- 2010, Pure Art, Miami Beach FL
- 2010, Zu Gallery, Miami FL
- 2010, Naomi Silva Gallery, Atlanta, GA
- 2011, Artopia Art Center at Wynwood, Miami FL
- 2011, Ivan Galindo Gallery, Miami FL
- 2012, Enigma, Art Basel Week Wynwood, Miami FL
- 2012, United by Zhayr, Miami FL
- 2012, A Woman's Perspective, Miguel Rodez Art Projects, Miami FL
- 2013, Communications, TA Project Gallery, Miami FL
- 2013, Umbrellas of Little Havana, CubaOcho Art & Research Center, Miami FL
- 2014, Expressions of Women, CubaOcho Art & Research Center, Miami FL
- 2014, Obrapía Fine Art Mona Lisa, Miami FL
- 2019, Alchemy, North Miami Beach Library
- 2019, Art & Love, Miami Hispanic Cultural Center
- 2019, Collective exhibition, La Celestina Museo, Montalbán, Spain

== Collections ==
Alcayaga's work forms part of the Rodríguez Collection of the Museum of Contemporary Art of the Americas (MoCA Americas), where paintings from her practice have been incorporated into the institution's collection of contemporary Latin American and international art, as well as the Kendall Art Center (KAC) and Spanish Cultural Center of Miami.

Her paintings are also represented in private collections in the United States, Spain, Switzerland, France and throughout Latin America.

== Family ==
Alcayaga belongs to the Chilean Alcayaga family, which includes the poet Gabriela Mistral, born Lucila Godoy Alcayaga. Mistral is noted for winning the Nobel Prize in Literature in 1945, and was the first Latin American author as well as the first Latin American woman to win the award.

Through the Alcayaga lineage, Mistral was a cousin of Alcayaga's grandfather, Augusto Enrique Alcayaga Alcayaga, placing the artist within the extended family of the Chilean writer. Although it has not formed a direct subject of her artistic practice, this familial connection has been noted in biographical accounts concerning Alcayaga's Chilean heritage and her general upbringing within an artistically-active family background.

== See also ==
- Cuban art
- Chilean art
- Abstract art
- Gabriela Mistral
