= Liliana Wilson Grez =

Chilean artist and activist

Lilian Wilson Grez (born in 1953) is a Chilean artist and feminist activist. Grez's art has been featured in exhibits sponsored by art organizations such as; La Peña Cultural Center and the non-profit organization: Women and their Work.

== Biography ==
=== Early life ===
Grez was born in Valparaiso, Chile in 1953 Her father, Gustavo Wilson, worked as a merchant marine and was in charge of supplies. Grez's father was away for most of her life, which led her to be raised solely by her mother. Grez's mother, Adriana Grez, was a housewife. Grez and her four siblings lived in Chile, during an era of social turmoil that inspired her art. In 1977, Grez moved to the United States, which initially meant leaving behind her family, although two siblings eventually followed.

=== Education ===
Her initial experiences with Catholic school were another influence on her art. Grez attended Los Sagrados Corazones Catholic School until 10th grade and Liceo de Niñas de Viña del Mar Public School for the remainder of her high school years. Both were all-girls schools. Later, Grez attended a university in Chile, where she chose to study architecture because it allowed her to practice drawing. However, Grez abandoned architecture in favor of studying law at the University of Valparaiso, as part of an intended judicial career, which Grez also abandoned upon spending more time in court. Grez then studied art at Southwest Texas State University in San Marcos, Texas.

=== Religion ===
Grez grew up in a Catholic household. Her grandparents and parents were all Catholic. Later in life, she considered herself Buddhist.

=== Life in the United States ===
Grez moved to the United States in 1977 when she was 23 years old. Grez arrived in Austin, Texas, where she worked cleaning houses and hotels, and as a nanny. Grez did not speak English or understand North American culture; her first few years were difficult.

== Art ==
Grez's artwork is informed by feelings of abandonment, innocence, and dreamlike states. Much of her work is based on the experience of Mexican immigrants who cross the United States border, portraying the obstacles and difficulties they face.

Some works include:

- Maize Girl, Mixed Media on paper, 2010.
- Niña en el Desierto, Acrylic on wood, 1998.
- El Calvario, Pencil on Paper, 2001.
- Soy Inmigrante, Pencil on Paper, 2010.
