= Christiane Pooley =

Chilean visual artist

- Born: Santiago, Chile
- Education: Pontifical Catholic University of Chile, Chelsea College of Art and Design
- Known for: Painting
- Movement: Contemporary art

Christiane Pooley (born 1983) is a Chilean visual artist. She lives and works in Paris.

She was born in Temuco, Chile. After studying at the Pontifical Catholic University of Chile, she obtained her degree at the Chelsea College of Art and Design in London.

Pooley has developed a taste for researching and creating spaces in her paintings. In her exhibition Bordes del mundo she explores landscapes, both natural and human.
