= Francisca Sutil =

Chilean artist (born 1952)

- Born: Francisca Sutil; 1952 (age 73–74); Santiago, Chile
- Known for: Painting, printmaking
- Awards: Premio Marco Bontá, Best Exhibition of the Year for "The Will of Silence", Fondo de Cultura y Desarollo de las Artes, EMF, Artist Space, NEA, Drawing Center, Fellowship for the Organization of American States, Premio De Gráfica, Bienal Internacional de Arte.
- Website: http://www.franciscasutil.cl/v2/

Francisca Sutil (born 1952) is a Chilean artist. She studied at the Southern Methodist University and Pontificia Universidad Católica de Chile and received her M.F.A in printmaking at the Pratt Institute. Her work has been exhibited widely around the world, most recently her work was shown at the Galería Patricia Ready in Chile and the Art Basel Hong Kong. She is also part of various public collections such as the National Gallery of Art in Washington, D.C., and the Museo Nacional de Bellas Artes in Santiago, Chile.

She was the recipient of the Premio de Gráfica at the Bienal internacional de Arte in Valparaiso, Chile and a fellowship for the Organization of American States in Washington, D.C.

She currently lives and works in Santiago, Chile.

== Early life and education ==
In 1972, Francisca Sutil studied at the School of Art in the Southern Methodist University in Dallas, Texas. In 1976, she graduated from in the Bellas Artes, Pontificia Universidad Católica de Chile in Santiago. After attending Parson School of Design for a year, she did a seminar at the Whitney Museum of Art in New York. In 1981, she received an M.F.A in Printmaking at the Pratt institute in Brooklyn, New York.

== Career and artwork ==
Francisca Sutil began her art career in the late 1970s making flat, paper cast work. Her strong interest in technical processes has led her work to evolve and change many times. She has worked in printmaking, papermaking and painting but her style and appreciation for meaning has remained constant throughout her career. Her well-crafted, abstract artwork reflects her love and understanding of process and materiality and alludes to high modernist abstraction and influences from artists like Jackson Pollock, Morris Louis and Ellsworth Kelly.

At the Pontifical Catholic University of Chile, Sutil learned that she was more attracted to printmaking than painting. Sutil was always questioning her surroundings and her curiosity led her to engage in classical methods but approach them in unusual ways. Sutil would place flat objects one on top of the other to convey depth and light in her work. Her interest in printmaking induced her to conceive her series Evolución, for which she worked with screen-printing using oil paint instead of ink. Using these non-traditional methods allowed her to explore the concepts of the mental and spiritual evolution of men.

Sutil moved to New York in the late 70's to study printmaking at Pratt. It was there where she discovered papermaking and mastered the process. From the late 1970s to mid 1980s, Sutil was making sculptural abstract works out of cast paper. Her deep interest in printmaking and paper making has kept her close to all types of papers. For Sutil, paper acted not only as a surface for her work, but also as a structure that was part of her work.

In 1986, Francisca Sutil began using oil pastels on her hand made paper, after two years she fully committed to painting with pigmented gesso but soon after, in the 90's, watercolor, Chinese ink and oils. Her series Space consisted of vertical lines on paper one after the other, the gesso did not have the correct consistency and did not work with this type of technique.

In 2006, after an exhausting time in which she had to prepare for a big retrospective at the Bellas Artes Museum of Art and a monograph on her work, Francisca Sutil decided to take a year long trip to Europe in which she traveled all around the country absorbing the origins of Western Painting and Art of the XIII- XVIII centuries.

After a year of traveling she decided to begin working with paint, this medium would allow her to examine her deep- seated questions about the relationship between materials. Her travels reflected on many of her following artworks such as Interludios. In these works, colors that she had never used appeared, the size was reduced and composition changed creating more intimate works that displayed all the knowledge she gained from her one-year abroad.

For her next big series, Mute, Sutil marks a new phase in her career. Her new technique consists of loading a brush with ink or paint and placing it down on paper many times, this method creates an oval shaped mark that repeats continuously in lines going down the paper. Her new technique is reminiscent of "palotes", a technique used in schools to teach children how to write. Like "palotes", Sutil's oval shaped marks are placed one after the other, requiring time and concentration and creating all different final pieces. The colors she uses are mostly gray, black and white but in each work Sutil manages to make the colors stand out and look contrasted, conveying a chiaroscuro effect without the traditional methods and techniques. Many critics have thought about it as a metaphor for passing time, others see it as an act of prayer.

== Awards ==
Francisca Sutil has been the recipient to various awards, fellowships and grants throughout her long career.

Starting in 1972, she received a fellowship from the Southern Methodist university school of art in Dallas Texas. In 1976, she received a prize for the Drawing category from the Pontificia Universidad Catolica de Chile in Santiago. A year later, 1977, she received a graphic prize for the Bienal Internacional de Arte in Valparaiso, Chile. In 1980, she received a fellowship from the Organization of American States in Washington, D.C. In 1981, she received the NEA from the Drawing Center (Paper Conservation) in New York. she was awarded the EMF from the Artists Space in New York in 183 and in 1992 she received an award from the Fondo de Cultura y Desarolo de las Artes in Santiago Chile.

Most recently she was awarded, in 2016, Best Exhibition of the Year for "The Will of Silence" by the Circle of Chilean Art Critics and in 2017, she received the Marco Bontá Prize from the Academia Chilena de Bellas Artes in Chile.

== Solo exhibitions ==
Francisca Sutil has had many one- person exhibitions, most recently she showed, "Alquimia/Alchemy" in 2006 in Santiago, Chile. In 2007, "Resonance" showed at Nohra Haime Gallery in New York. In 2010 she showed at the Galería Animal, "Interludio," “Muestra Chaco," "Arte Contemporáneo y Fe," at the Sala Blanca Centro de Extension UC. In 2011, "Mute" at the Sala Gasco Arte Contemporaneo in Santiago. In 2012, she showed at the Nohra Haime Gallery, a show called "Interlude" and a year later she showed "Mute," at the same place. In 2015, she showed "Chaco" at the Galería Patricia Ready, and in 2016 she showed at the same gallery, "Obra En Papel" and at Art Basel in Hong Kong.

== Group exhibitions ==
Francisca Sutil has been also part of many group exhibitions, most recently she showed at Nohra Haime Gallery, Art Palm Beach in Florida, the Armory in New York, Atrium Gallery in St. Louis, Missouri, Galería Animal, Chile, Art20, Art Chicago, Art Miami, Bruce Museum in Connecticut, ArtBo in Colombia. LA Art Fair, Arteamericas in Miami.

== Lectures ==
In 1990, Sutil did a lecture in America's Society, SUNY Binghamton in New York.

== Public and selected corporate collections ==
Sutil's work is in public places such as Archer M. Huntington Art Gallery at the University of Texas in Austin, Texas, Cruz Chapel in Santiago, Chile, El Museo in New York, Museo de Artes Visuales in Santiago, Museo de Bellas Artes, in Caracas, Venezuela, Museo de Bellas Artes in Santiago, National Gallery of Art in Washington, D.C., Universidad Catolica in Santiago, Vassar College Art Gallery at Poughkeepsie, New York. And also at selected corporate collections such as, Armstrong in Teasdale, Schlafy, Davis & Dicus in St. Louis, Missouri, Banco del Estado in Santiago, Chile, Chase Manhattan Bank in New York, Santiago IBM in Chile, O.C.P. in Paris, France, Reader's Digest, New York, SSC & B Lintas Worldwide, New York, St. Joe's Minerals, New York, Shearson Lehman Hutton in Miami, Florida, Viñedos Sutil in Santiago, World Bank in Washington, D.C., Xerox Corporation in Stamford, Connecticut.
