= Sam Coronado =

Sam Coronado (October 19, 1946 – November 11, 2013) was a Mexican-American artist, educator, and activist known for his contributions to the Chicano art movement, especially through his work in printmaking. He founded the Serie Project, a non-profit organization aimed at providing emerging and underrepresented artists access to printmaking, and Coronado Studio, a print studio in Austin, Texas. Coronado's work and advocacy significantly advanced Latino representation in the American art world.

== Early life and education ==
Sam Coronado was born in Ennis, Texas, on October 19, 1946. Raised in a working-class Mexican-American family, he experienced firsthand the racial and social disparities that influenced much of his later work. Coronado’s experiences during the Vietnam War, where he served in the U.S. Army, deepened his awareness of social issues and the need for representation of marginalized communities.

Upon returning to the United States, Coronado pursued a career in art, studying at the University of Texas at Austin and the School of the Art Institute of Chicago. His education at these institutions gave him both technical expertise and a platform to explore the growing Chicano civil rights movement. He was deeply influenced by his heritage, as well as his commitment to social justice, which became central themes in his career as an artist and educator.

== Career and artistic contributions ==
Coronado began his career as a commercial artist, but quickly shifted to fine art, using screen printing as his primary medium. In 1993, he founded Coronado Studio in Austin, Texas, which would later give rise to his most significant project: The Serie Project. The Serie Project, also founded in 1993, was a non-profit initiative providing artists—particularly those from underrepresented backgrounds—free access to screen printing facilities. Each artist had the opportunity to create a limited-edition print with guidance from Coronado and his team. Over the course of two decades, the Serie Project produced more than 250 prints, promoting the work of Chicano, Latino, and other minority artists.

The goal of the Serie Project was not only to elevate underrepresented voices but also to make art accessible and affordable to wider audiences. Coronado’s emphasis on community-building through art helped shape the careers of many Latino artists and influenced broader efforts to create equitable representation within the art world.

In addition to his printmaking, Coronado was an educator, teaching art at Austin Community College, where he worked to inspire the next generation of artists. His mentorship of students and emerging artists helped ensure that the values of inclusivity, cultural pride, and community remained important to his legacy.

=== Style and themes ===
Coronado’s artistic style is closely tied to the Chicano art movement, blending Mexican-American cultural imagery with contemporary themes of identity, social justice, and immigration. He was known for his use of bright colors and bold graphic elements, often drawing from Mexican folk art and indigenous motifs. His screen prints depicted themes of biculturalism, family, and resistance, reflecting his own personal experiences as well as the broader struggles of the Latino community in the United States.

His participation in exhibitions like “Chicano Graphics: Quinceañera Re-visited” at the Smithsonian American Art Museum highlights the importance of his work within the broader narrative of Chicano art and the Latinx experience in America.

== Personal life ==
Sam Coronado was not only a celebrated artist but also a devoted husband and father. He balanced his artistic career with a commitment to family and community, always advocating for those whose voices had been marginalized. His personal life mirrored his professional philosophy: art as a tool for community building, education, and empowerment.

== Legacy ==
Sam Coronado died on November 11, 2013, in Austin, Texas, but his impact continues to resonate in the art community. His work is featured in the permanent collections of major institutions, including the Smithsonian American Art Museum and the Mexic-Arte Museum in Austin. His efforts in founding the Serie Project are celebrated for providing opportunities to minority artists, and the prints produced through this initiative are seen as pivotal in promoting Latino art.

The Austin Convention Center houses a large collection of his works, including Corazón, an iconic mural that symbolizes the unity and strength of the Latino community. In February 16, 2016, the gallery at the Emma. S. Barrientos Mexican American Cultural Center was renamed in his honor. His contributions to art and education have been honored by institutions such as Austin Community College, which reflects on his role in “Cultivating Community through Art”—a legacy that lives on in both the local art scene and nationally.

=== Exhibitions and public collections ===
- Smithsonian American Art Museum, Washington, D.C.
- Mexic-Arte Museum, Austin, Texas
- Austin Convention Center, Austin, Texas
- Austin Community College, Austin, Texas
