= Alejandra Ruddoff =

Chilean sculptor (born 1960)

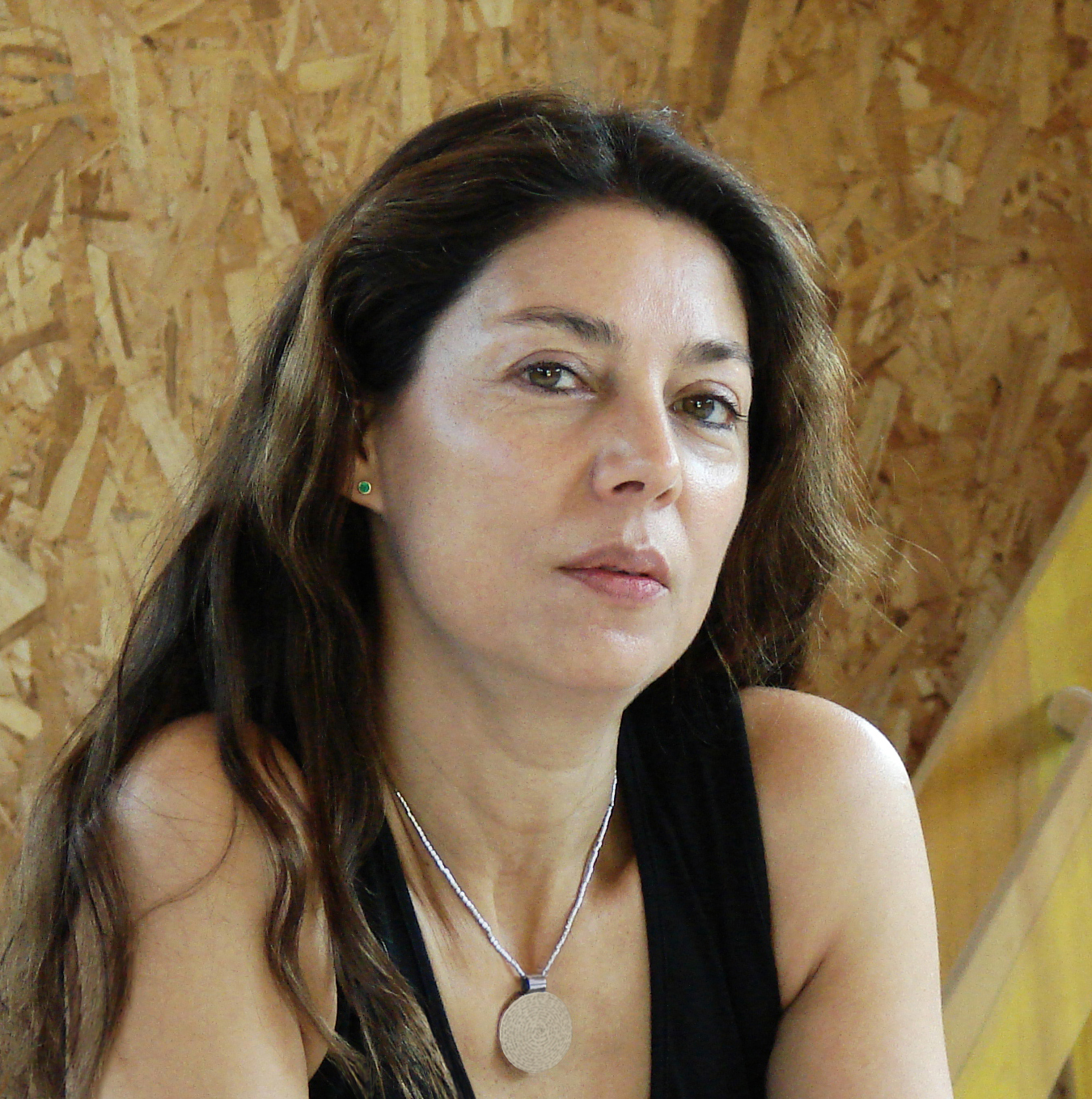
Alejandra Ruddoff

Alejandra Ruddoff (born 1960 in Santiago de Chile) is a Chilean sculptor.

== Biography ==
Ruddoff studied sculpture at the University of Chile and graduated in 1985. In 1993 - having received a scholarship from DAAD (German Academic Exchange Service) - she acquired a post-graduate diploma of the Munich Academy of Fine Arts. She was awarded the First Prize of the Chilean Ministry of Public Works in 2000. In addition, her work Homage to the Wind - which according to the writer Raúl Zurita has the germinating ease of a poem and at the same time the purity of most ancient monuments - was erected at the Panamericana. Special exhibitions of her three-dimensional works were staged at the National Museum of Fine Arts in Santiago de Chile and in the Tai Miao Temple in the Forbidden City of Beijing in 2003. Ruddoff has been teaching at arts academies since 2000. Ruddoff has developed large-format projects to be shown in public places. One of those is the construction Peace, Friendship and Time's Space (2001) which was modelled during the Fifth International Sculptors' Symposium held in Changchun and erected in its local sculpture park. Another of her sculptures Forward (1997) was unveiled in Potsdam in 2002. While staying at the Potsdam Volkswagen Design Center in 2006 she worked on variations of the objects. In 2010 the DAAD commissioned Ruddoff to sculpt Forward II which is now displayed in front of the DAAD headquarters at Bonn. She has been living as a freelance artist in Berlin since 2009.

== Gallery ==
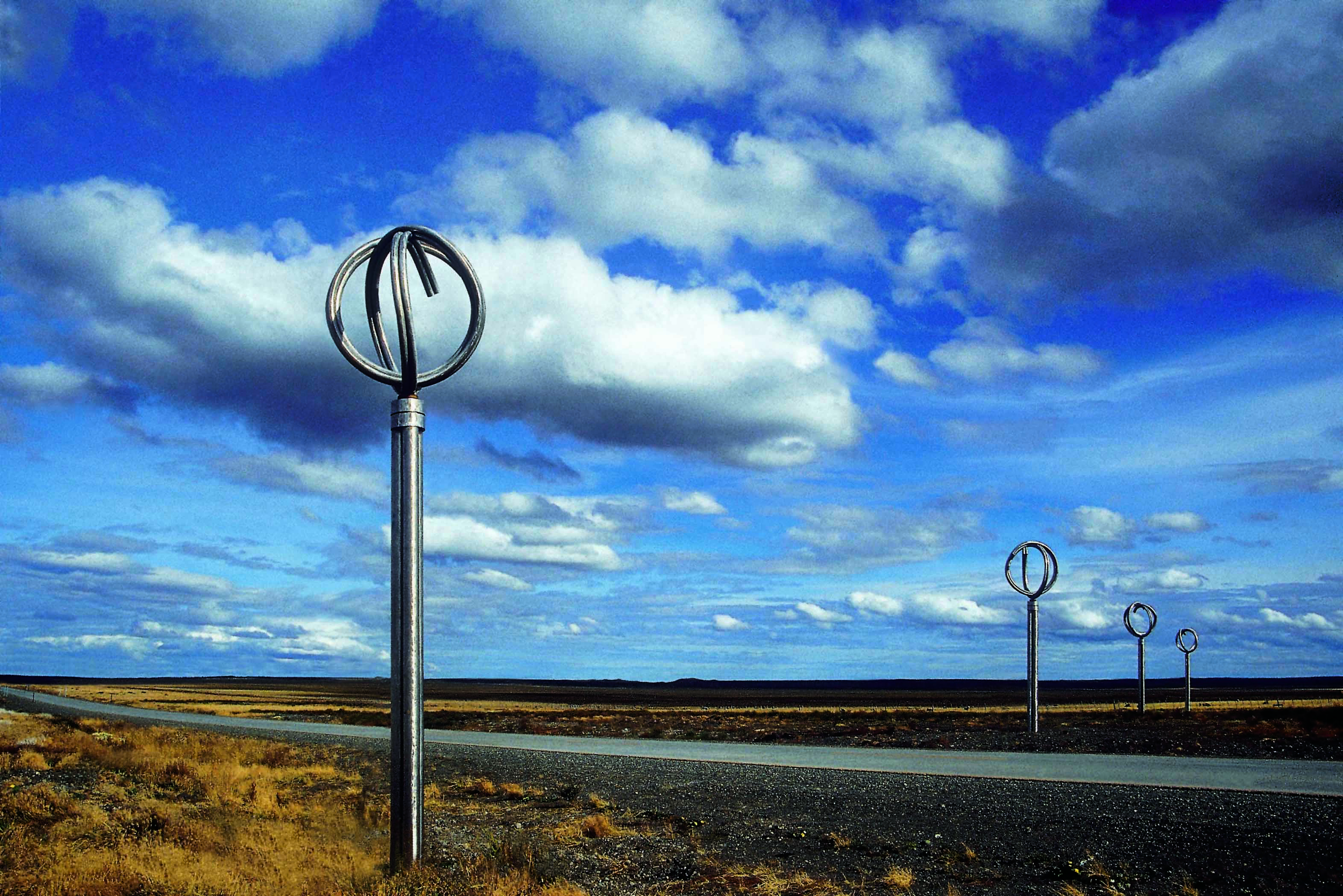
2000 Homenage to the Wind, 9 x 2,5 x 118 m, Stainless Steel, Panamericana Sur km 82.280 Chile

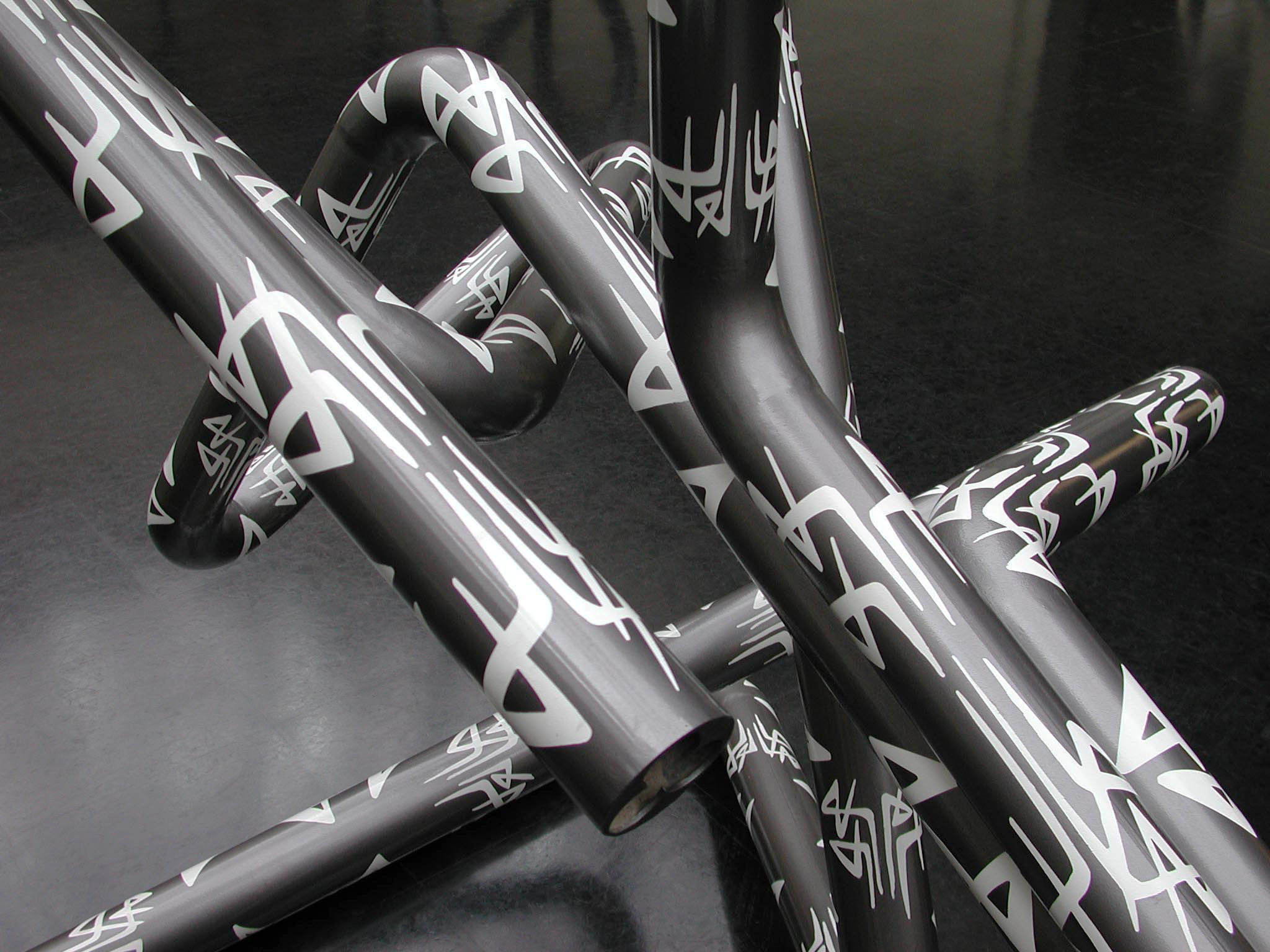
2001 Constellation in grey, 190 x 410 x 190 cm, Painted iron

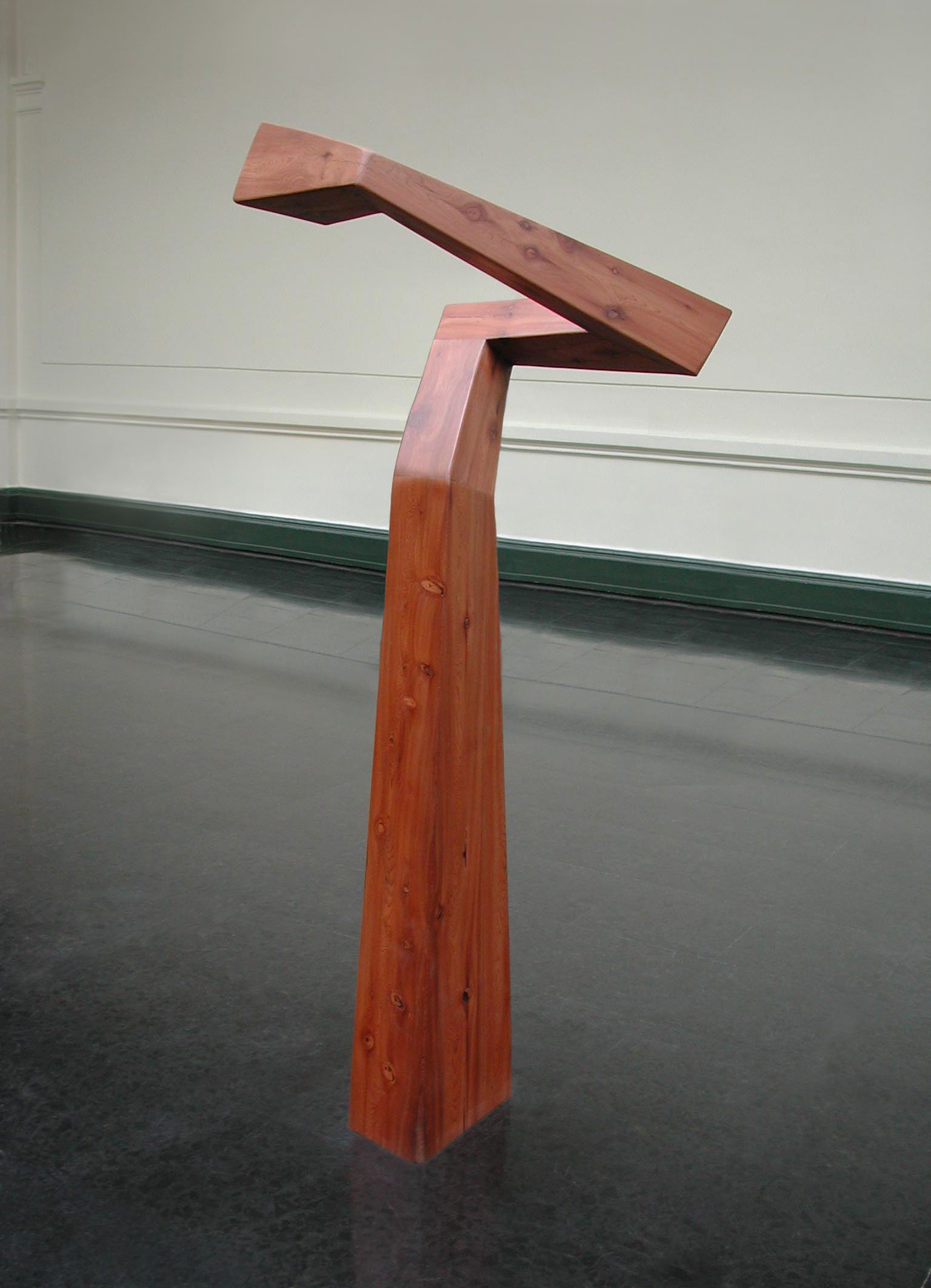
2001 Plica II, 184 x 71 x 67 cm, Alerce, Collection Museo Nacional de Bellas Artes

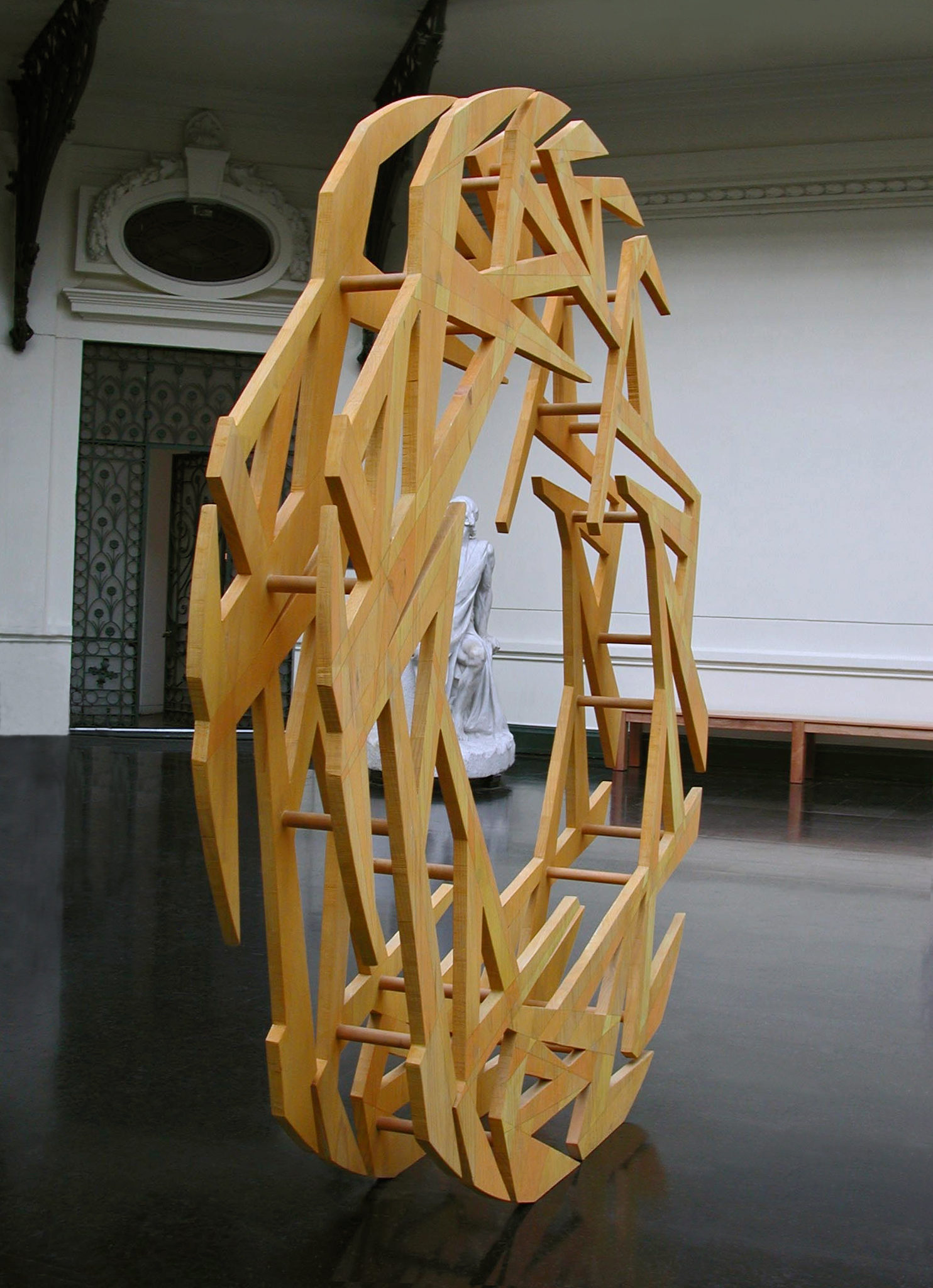
2003 Original record, 246 x 230 x 30 cm, Finger-jointed pine

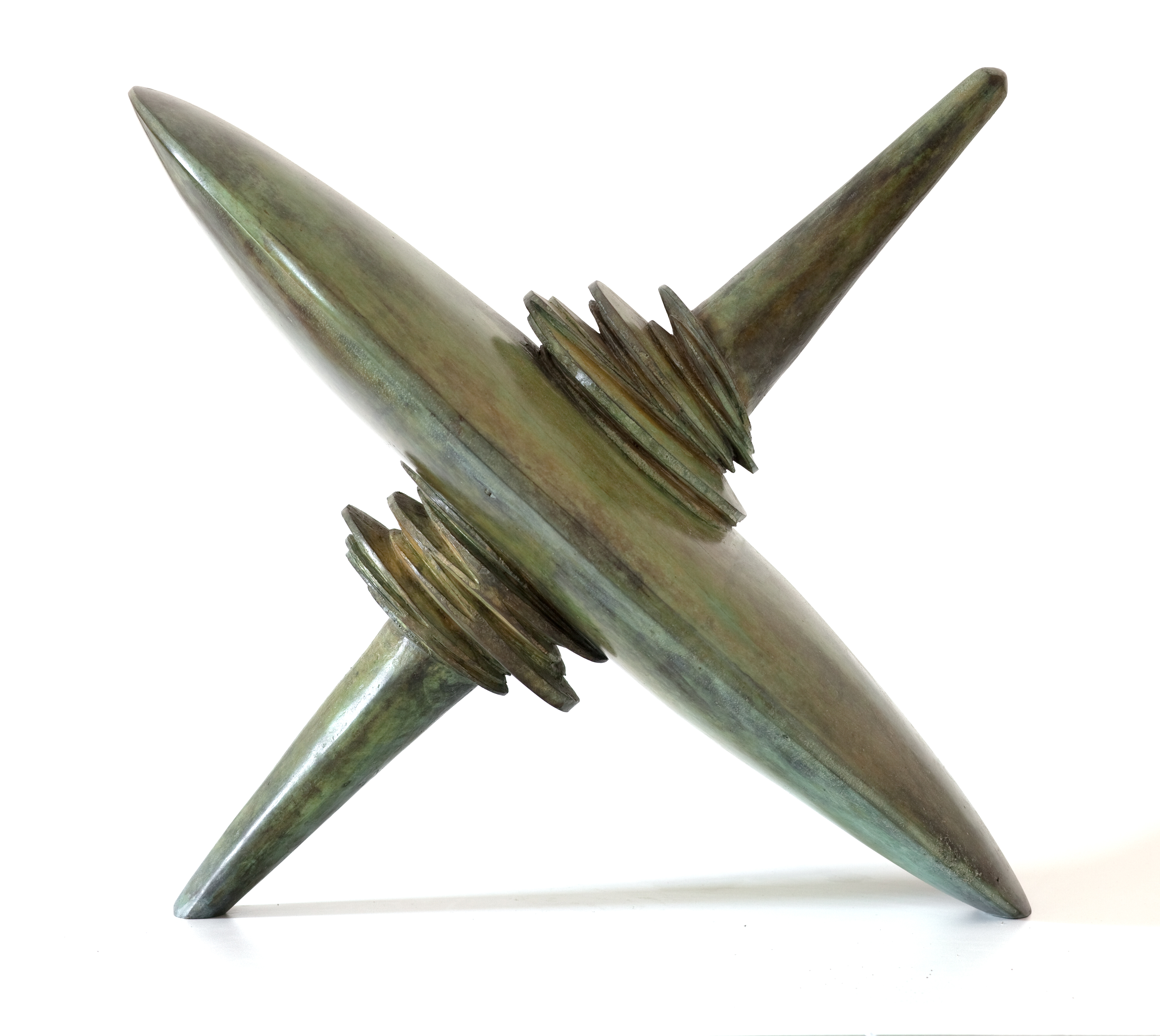
2006 Balance, 55 x 53 x 37 cm, Bronze

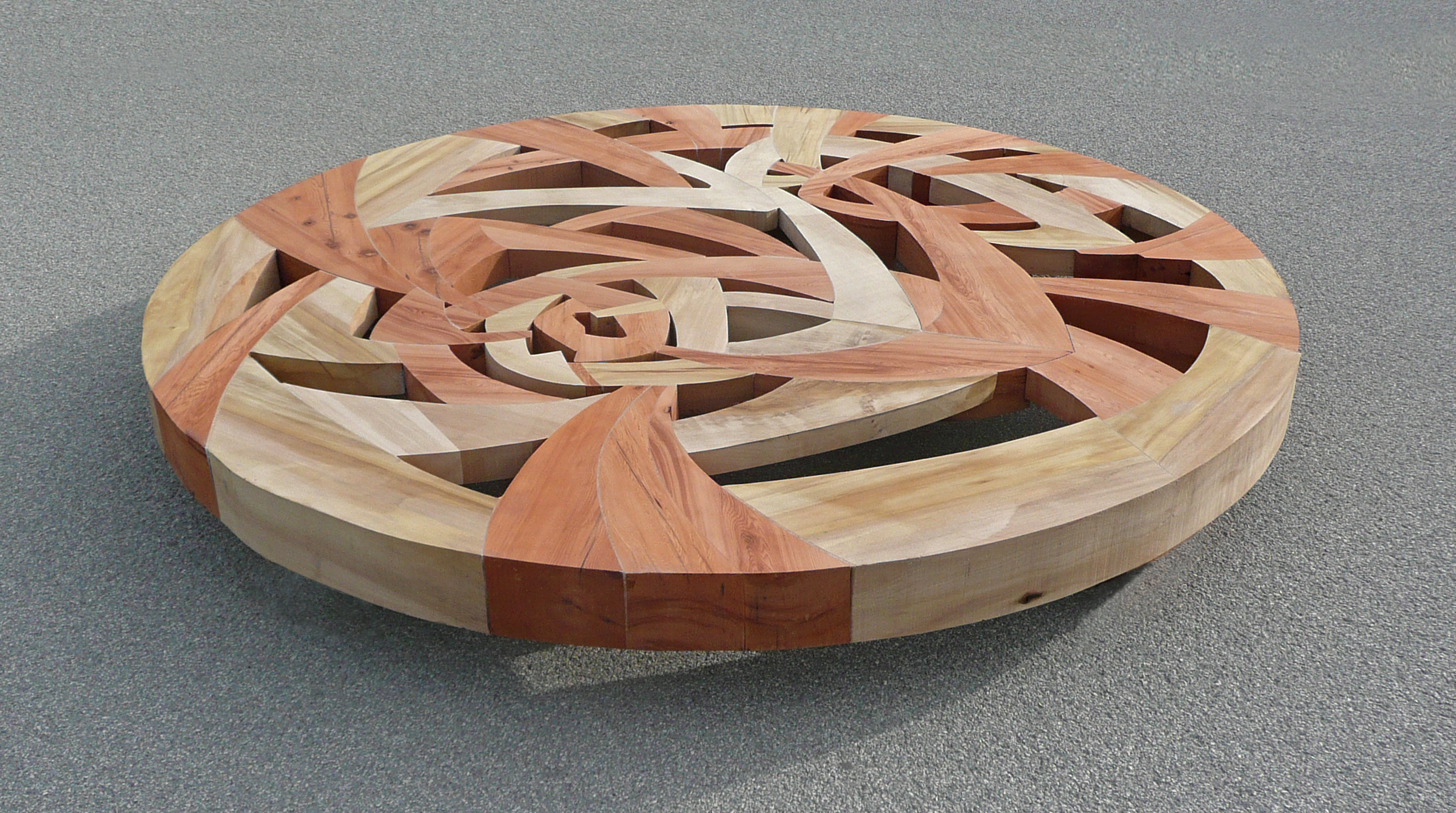
2009 Transcription of an emptiness, 210 x 210 x 13 cm, Alerce und laurel, Collection Sparkasse Wuppertal

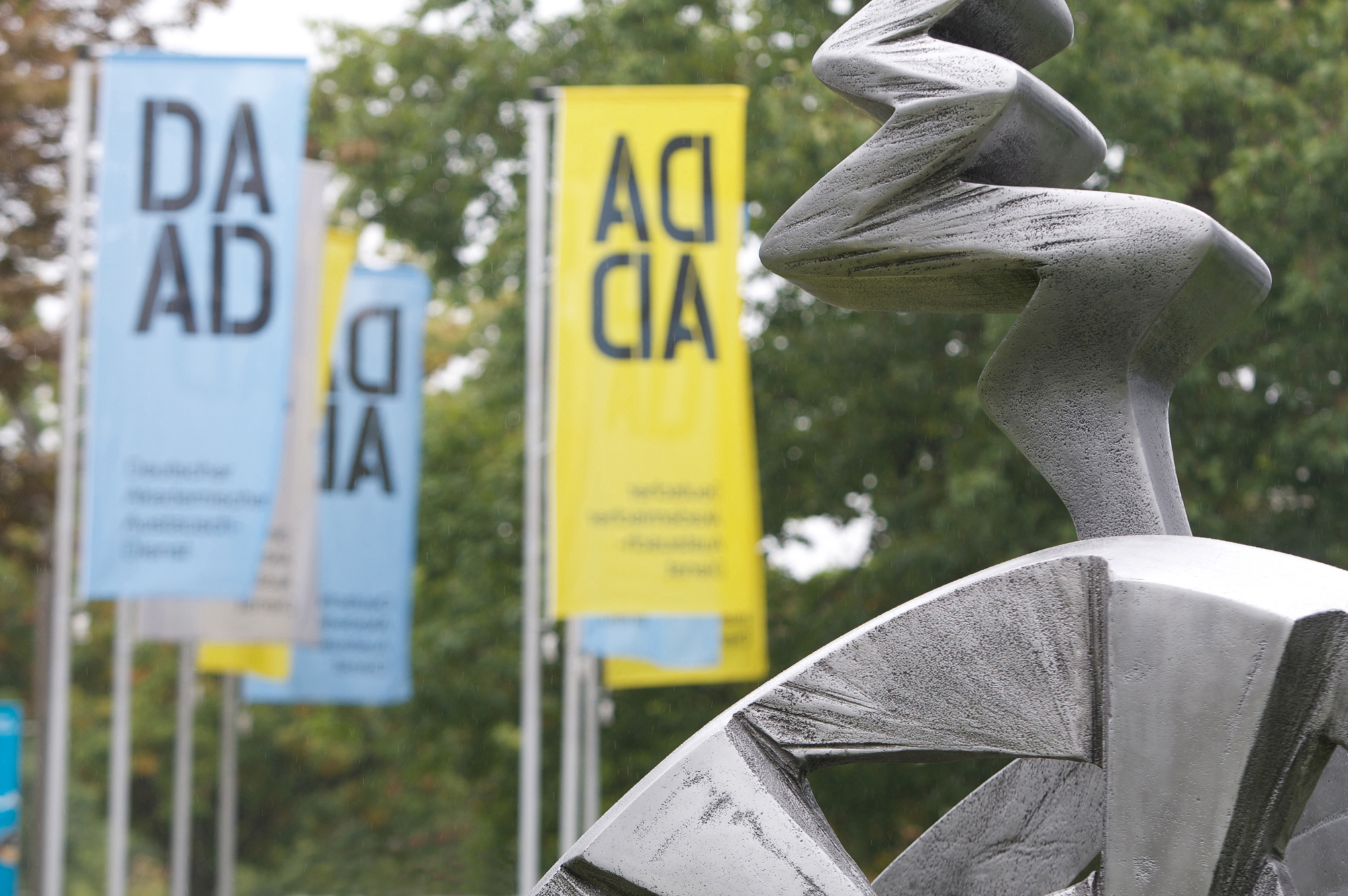
2010 Ahead II, 360 x 240 x 240 cm, Aluminium, DAAD-Main building in Bonn

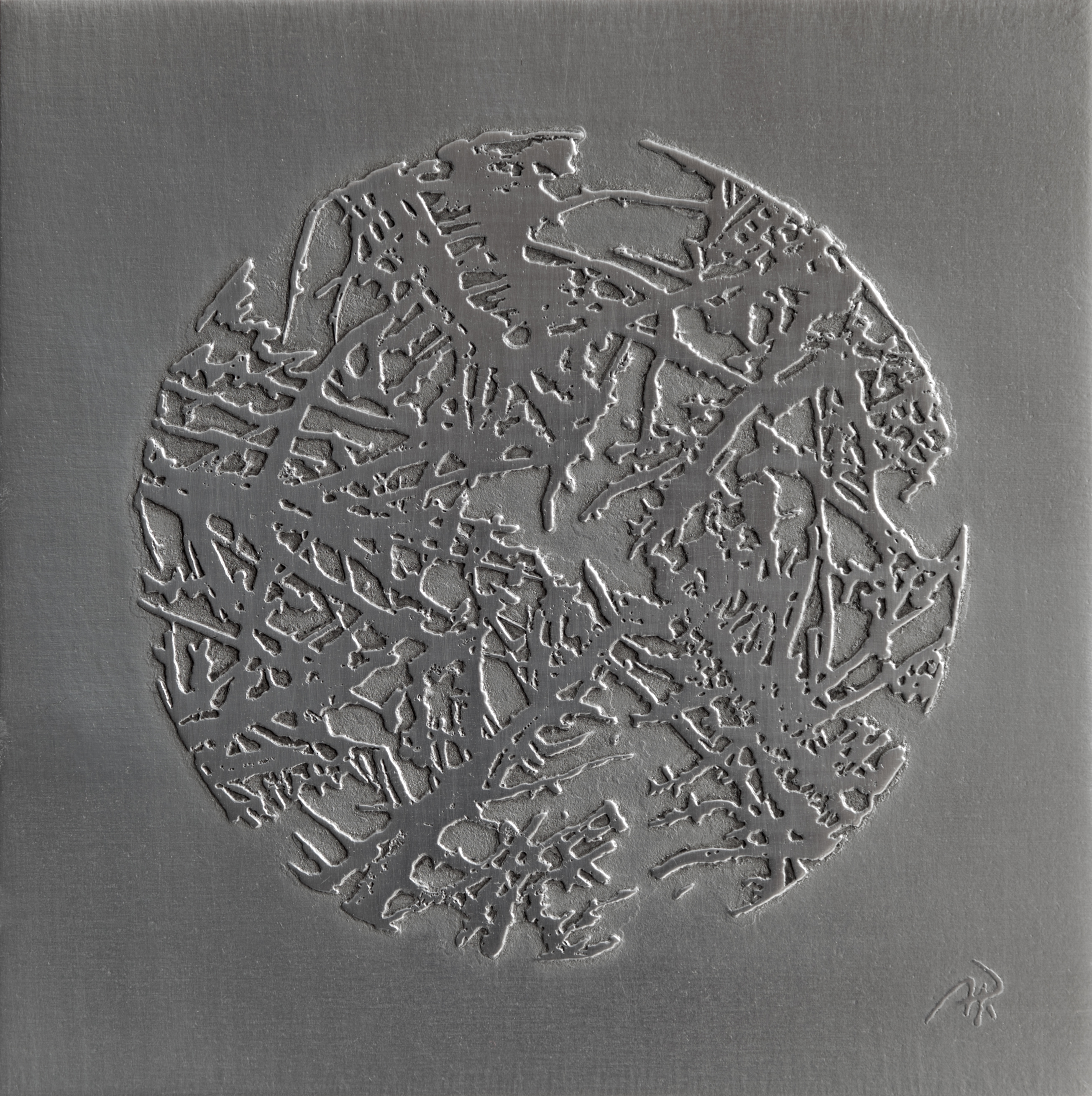
2011 Connection IV, 19 x 19 cm, Etching Zinc

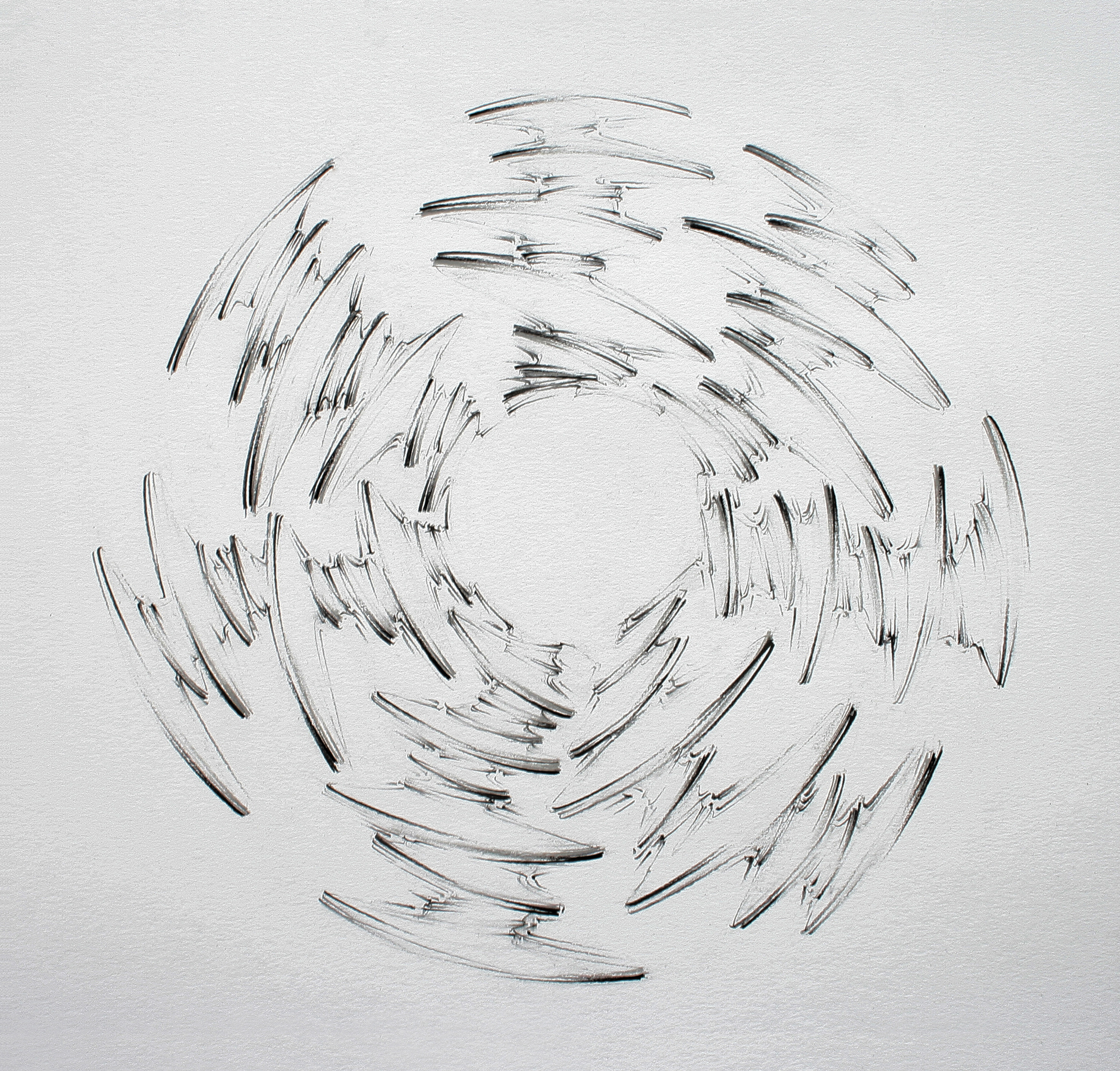
2012 Still in motion, 50 x 50 cm, Pencil

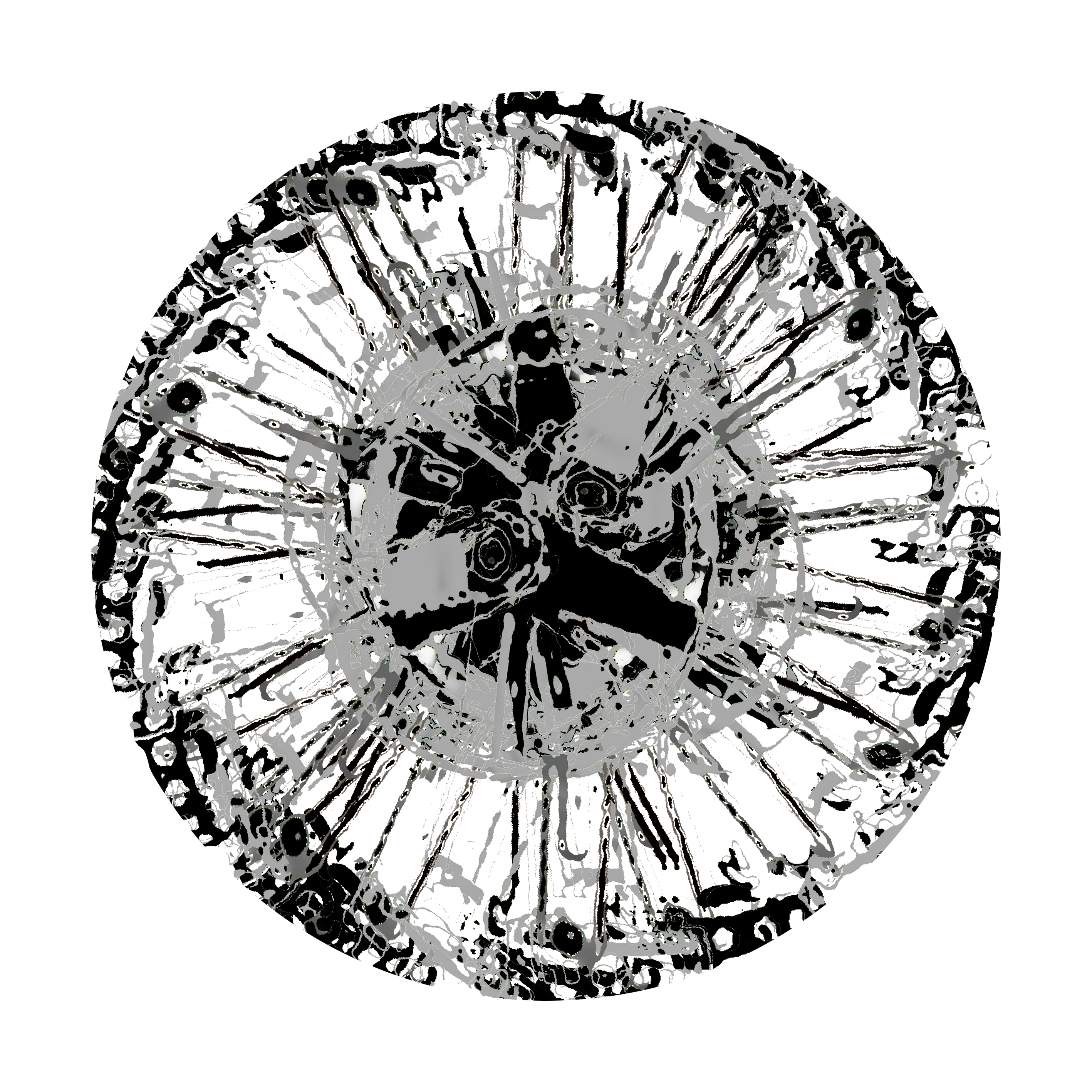
2012 Orbital, 50 x 50 cm, Digital Print

== Exhibitions (a selection) ==
2009	Nach Vorn Skulptur & Skizze	Altes Rathaus – Potsdam Forum	Potsdam
2008	Am Saum einer Spiegelung	Heidelberg Center	Santiago de Chile
2003	Wegen in Bewegung	Museo Nacional de Bellas Artes	Santiago de Chile

== Works in public collections ==
Chile	Germany	China
MNBA Museo Nacional de Bellas Artes, Santiago; MAVI Museo de Artes Visuales, Santiago; Parque de las Esculturas, Santiago; Diario El Mercurio, Santiago	Chilenische Botschaft, Berlin; DAAD, Bonn; Sparkasse Wuppertal, Wuppertal; Stadt Naumburg, Skulptur im öffentlichen Raum, Naumburg; Stadt Potsdam, Skulptur im öffentlichen Raum, Potsdam	Changchun World Sculpture Park, Changchun; Museum of Contemporary Art, Changchun

== Books ==
- Alejandra Ruddoff. Nach Vorn Skulptur & Skizze, Hrsg.: Luisa Frigolett, Santiago, 2009
- Alejandra Ruddoff, Arte en Chile, Hrsg.: Ezio Mosciatti, Santiago, 2000
