= Gregorio de la Fuente =

Chilean painter and muralist (1910–1999)

- Born: December 5, 1910; Santiago de Chile
- Died: December 28, 1999 (89 years old); Santiago de Chile
- Education: School of Fine Arts of the University of Chile; Juan Francisco González academy; Beaux-Arts de Paris; Académie de la Grande Chaumière
- Occupations: Painting, Muralism

Gregorio de la Fuente (Santiago, December 5, 1910 – ibidem, December 28, 1999) was a Chilean painter and muralist. Along with artists Julio Escámez, José Venturelli, Fernando Marcos, Fernando Daza and Pedro Olmos. He is one of the important representatives of the Chilean muralist movement of the 20th century, largely influenced by Mexican muralism.

== Studies in Chile and abroad ==
"Painting is human communication, the best way to express the inexpressible."

— Gregorio de la Fuente

In 1927 he entered the Parque Forestal School of Fine Arts, where he remained until its closure in March 1929. There he was a student of Manuel Núñez and Carlos Isamitt. Later he continued his studies at the academy of Juan Francisco Gonzalez and in 1931 he rejoined the School of Fine Arts, after it moved to the University of Chile, under the direction of Julio Fossa Calderon. In 1937 he becomes a student and assistant in the Fresco Mural Painting course taught by Professor Laureano Guevara, replacing Israel Roa.

In 1943 he made his first trip to Argentina to study mural art. Some time later he went to Europe and in 1945 he obtained the support of a scholarship from the French government to perfect his fresco technique at the Beaux-Arts de Paris and at the Académie de la Grande Chaumière. During his stay in Europe he travels to Italy, Belgium, Holland, England and Spain, and later he visits Brazil, Mexico, Guatemala, Switzerland, the Soviet Union, Hungary, Bulgaria and Greece.

== Academic life ==
From 1938 to 1960, De la Fuente worked as a secondary education art teacher at the Liceo San Agustín in Santiago. Between 1946 and 1948 he taught drawing at the School of Fine Arts of the University of Chile, and between 1957 and 1971, he taught Mural Painting at the same university until his retirement, after his 60th birthday. He was also a member of the teaching commission of the School of Fine Arts.

At the same time, together with artists Camilo Mori, Mireya Lafuente and Carlos Sotomayor, he created the artistic group Escafandra. Between 1962 and 1968 he became director of the Casa de la Cultura de Ñuñoa, as well as founder and director of the Academia de Arte Juan Francisco González, which was named after his former tutor.

Finally, he was a juror for several art competitions, including the Chilean National Art Prize.

== His work ==
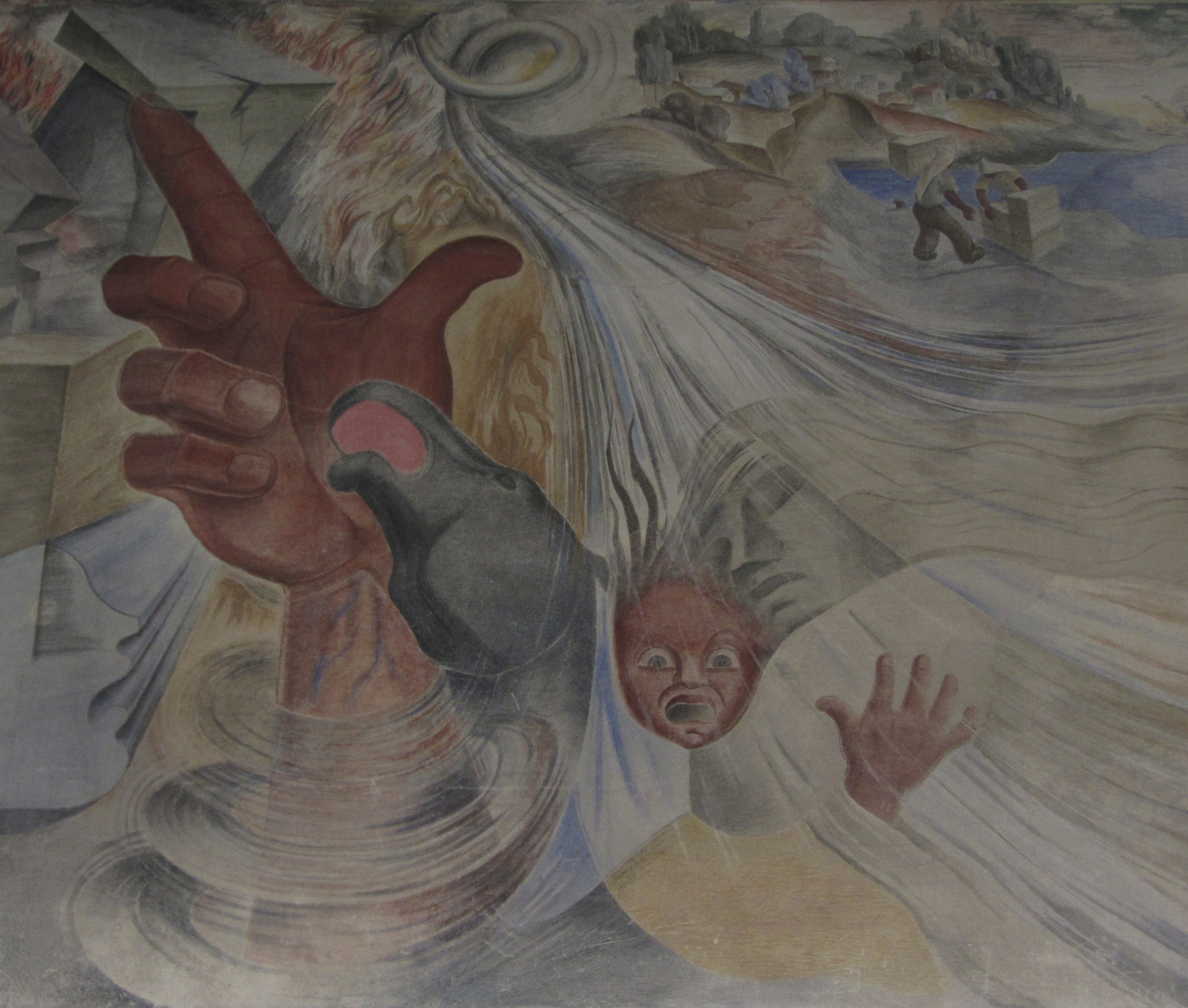
Detail of his mural Historia de Concepción (1943–1946).

=== Style ===
His work, which sought social vindication through painting, gradually changed from the social realism of his early years to a more abstract and cubist style. From his first stage, one of his most important works is the mural Historia de Concepción, created between 1942 and 1945, with the collaboration of assistants Sergio Sotomayor and Julio Escámez, located in the former Central Station of Concepción, where the Regional Government of Biobío is currently located. This mural is considered the "treasure of the Civic Quarter" and was declared a National Historic Monument on September 8, 2008.

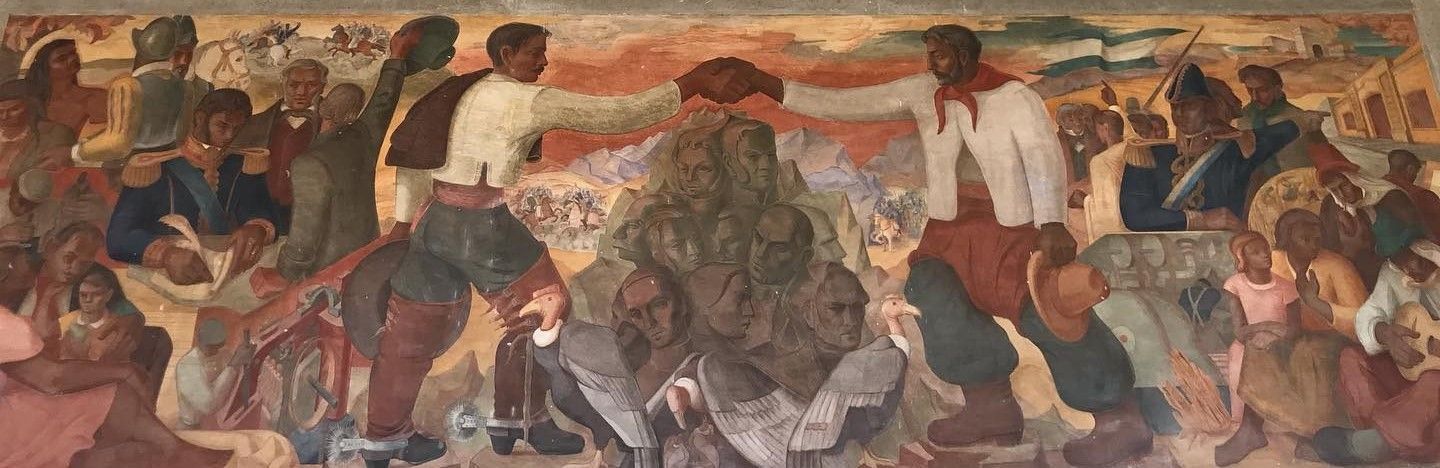
Mural "El Abrazo de los Pueblos", Gregorio de La Fuente, 1954, Los Andes Railway Station.

On a certain occasion, Gregorio expressed the following about his social commitment:

"It is undeniable that a mural, because of its location, is a public thing, which is in direct relationship with the people. In that sense it can serve to instruct or inspire social interests in people. I believe that a mural does not imply a political commitment, but a social one."

— Gregorio de la Fuente

=== Works ===
- History of Concepción (1943–1946, Former Central Station of Concepción, Chile)
- History of La Serena, mural at La Serena Railroad Station (1952)
- Mural at the Caja de Crédito Minero (La Serena)
- El Abrazo de los Pueblos, mural at Los Andes Railway Station (1953)
- Mural at the central hall of the Caja de Empleados Municipales de Santiago de Chile (1957)
