= Historia de la medicina y la farmacia en Chile =

1957 mural by Julio Escámez

- History of Medicine and Pharmacy in Chile (English)
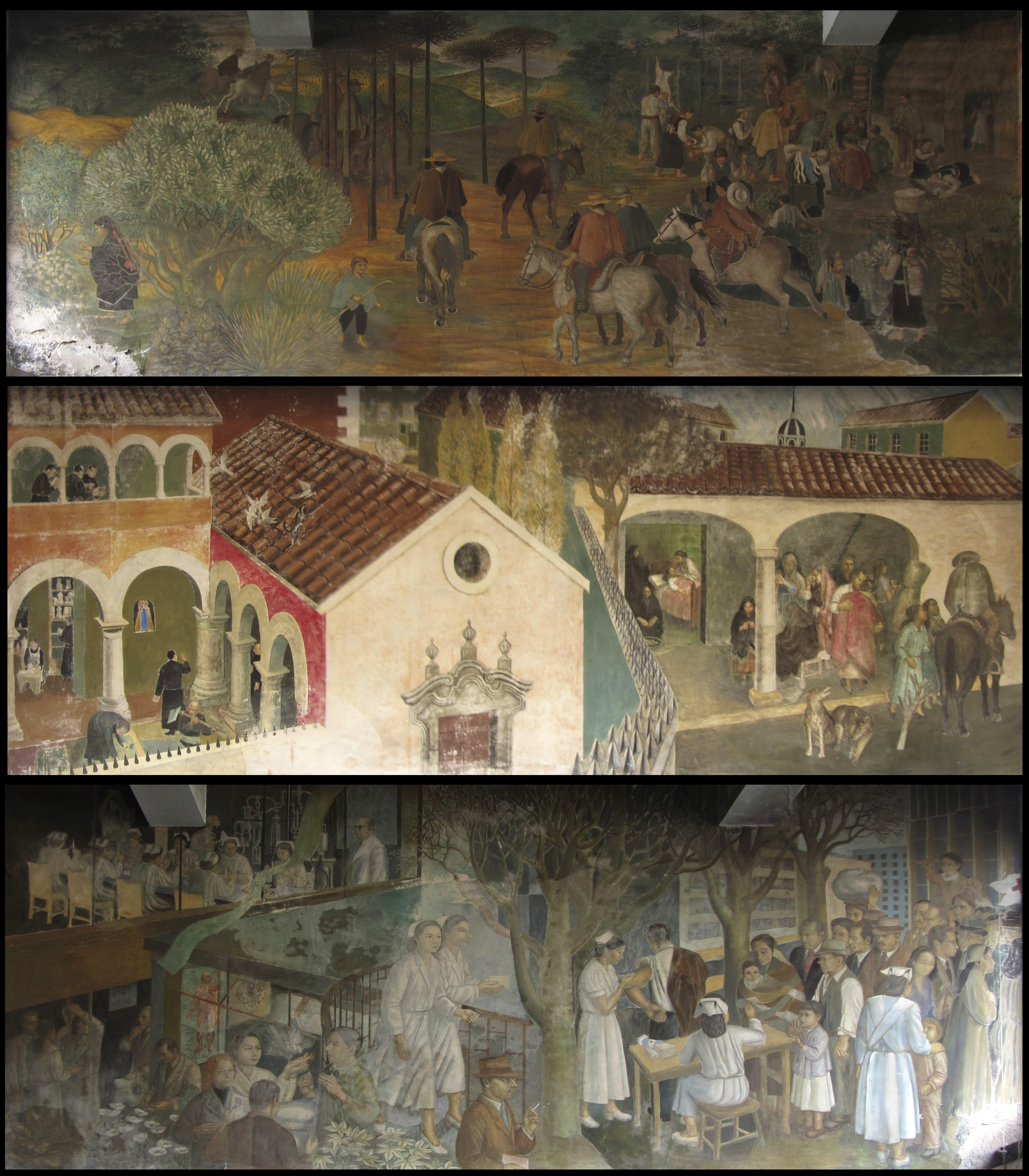
- Artist: Julio Escámez
- Year: 1957
- Completion date: 1958
- Movement: Social realism
- Location: Concepción, Chile Tucapel #676

Historia de la medicina y la farmacia en Chile (History of Medicine and Pharmacy in Chile) is a mural created in 1957 by the artist Julio Escámez for the former Maluje pharmacy, now the Alemana drugstore, located at 676 Tucapel Street in the city of Concepción. It is one of Escámez's most important works. Until 2015, it was considered a historically preserved building, with a "cultural" category for the city, and was declared a National Monument of Chile, in the category of Historical Monument, through Decree No. 370, dated September 1, 2015.

A photographic reproduction of the entire work is located in the Prof. César Leyton Caravagno Pharmacy Museum, housed in the College of Pharmaceutical Chemists, part of the Faculty of Chemical and Pharmaceutical Sciences of the University of Chile, in Santiago.

== History ==
=== Maluje pharmacy ===
The Maluje pharmacy was founded in the city of Concepción in 1951 by Chilean pharmacist María Maluje David, a descendant of Syrian immigrants. Initially, the pharmacy was located at the corner of Maipú and Tucapel streets. However, in 1957, due to the success of the business, María Maluje, along with her husband, lawyer Luis Contreras, decided to construct a building nearby on Tucapel Street, between Freire and Maipú, to house private apartments and relocate the business to these new premises.

Designed by architect Javier “Maco” Gutiérrez, the new premises were designed from the start to include a mural that could be seen from the street. For this reason, the pharmacy was built with double-height ceilings and large windows facing the street.

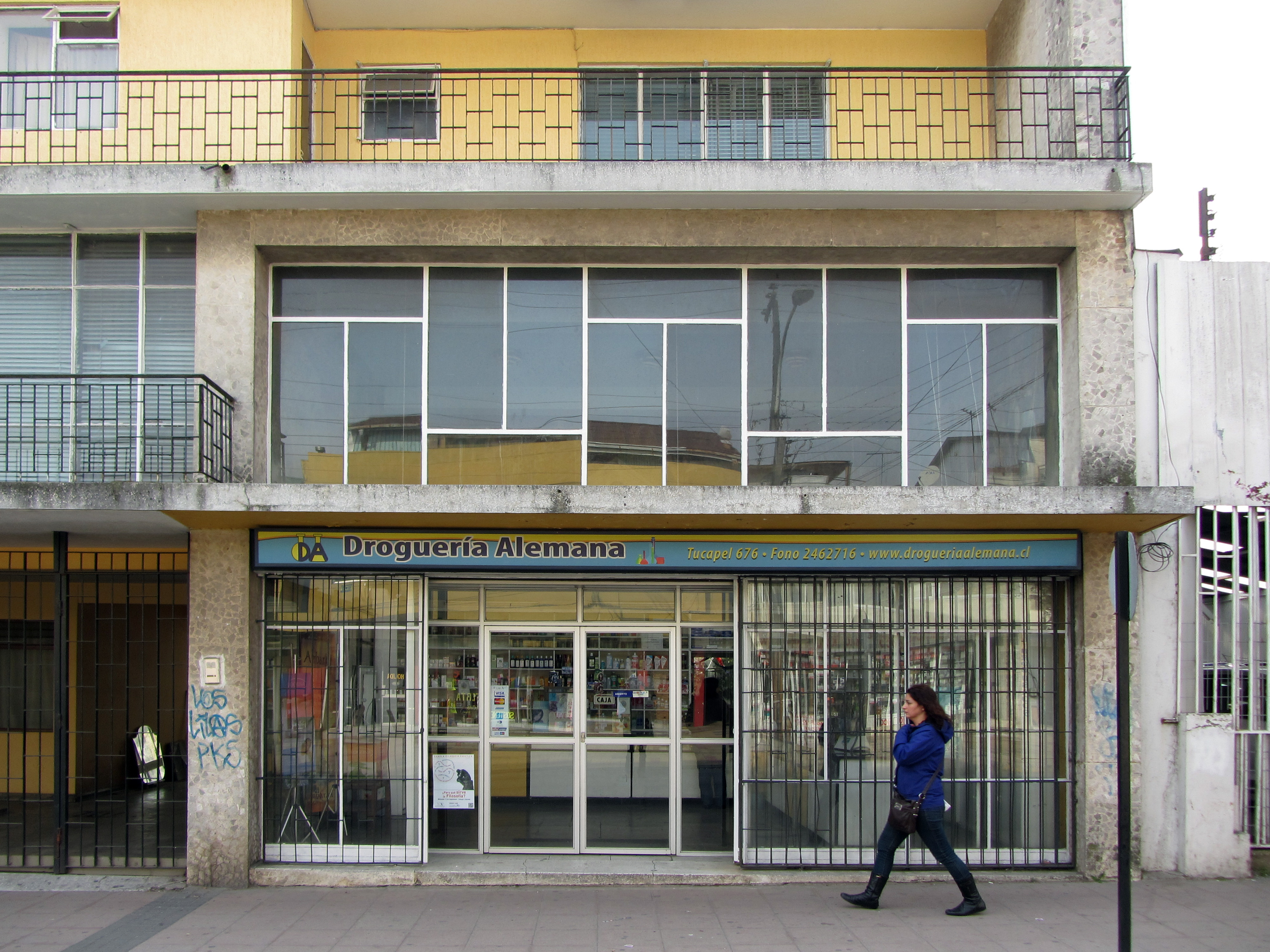
Exterior of the Alemana drugstore in 2012.

For more than fifty years, María Maluje herself prepared the medications, consulted with, and prescribed to the patients who came directly to her for treatment. In cases where patients could not pay immediately, María provided the medicines anyway, allowing them to pay later. Known for her strong yet kind character, according to her patients, her spirits declined after the disappearance of her son, Carlos Contreras Maluje, in 1976, three years after the military dictatorship began.

The pharmacy finally closed in February 2007, after fifty-six years of uninterrupted activity, after which it was replaced by the Alemana drugstore, which now has another branch on Lincoyán Street in the same city.

On September 7, 2012, Chilean singer-songwriter Manuel García held a private performance in the pharmacy’s premises for the launch of the book El parto de un siglo by engineer and communist politician Manuel Riesco Larraín. Participants took the opportunity to photograph and discuss the mural under which the entire event took place.

=== Creation of the mural ===
After the relocation of Maluje pharmacy in 1957 to its current location, María Maluje and her husband commissioned artist Julio Escámez to create a mural on the walls left vacant for this purpose.

Escámez, then a renowned painter in the area and since 1953 a professor of Mural Painting at the Institute of Art at the University of Concepción, had begun his formal painting studies in Concepción and later assisted muralist and painter Gregorio de la Fuente in creating the prestigious mural History of Concepción, located at the former central station of Concepción (1943-1946).

At the time of accepting the commission for the mural, the artist had just completed a scholarship at the Academy of Fine Arts in Florence. His studies in the Italian city, which began in 1955, specialized in fresco mural techniques, particularly the 14th and 16th-century paintings of Giotto and Piero della Francesca.

For the creation of the mural, Escámez worked for a month with the help of artist and carpenter Albino Echeverría, who would later become one of two Chilean collaborators assisting Mexican painter Jorge González Camarena in creating the famous mural Presence of Latin America.

== Characteristics ==
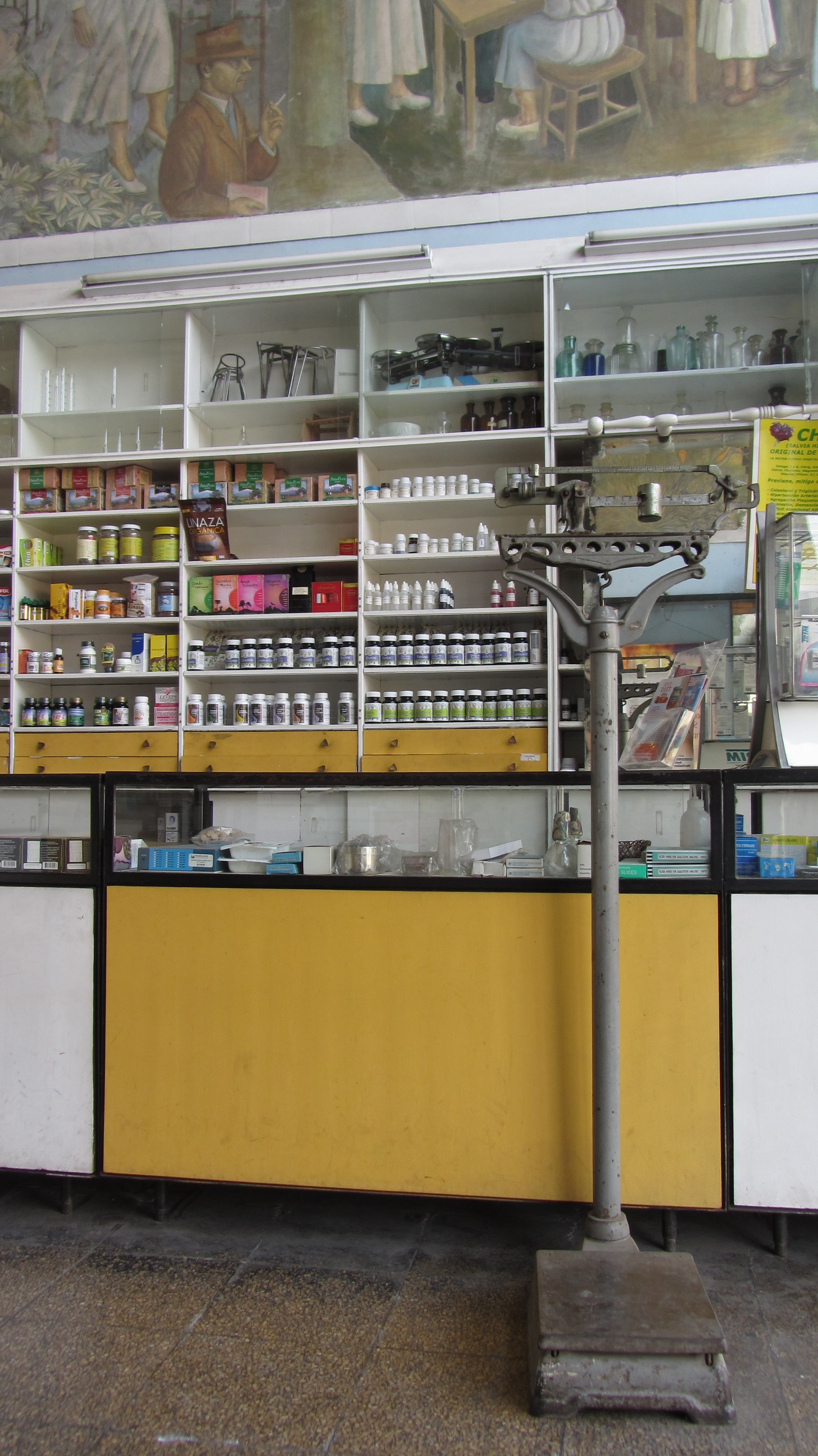
Interior of the Alemana drugstore in 2012, with part of the right side of the mural.

The mural continues the tradition of social realism initiated in the region by Chilean painter and muralist Gregorio de la Fuente. However, in this case, it is a less symbolic work than what was typical for De la Fuente, being more descriptive and anecdotal. Like the famous mural History of Concepción, it is made using the fresco technique, which requires less maintenance than other painting techniques. This technique involves mixing ground-colored earth with pure water, which is then applied over a mixture of lime and sand. This forms the painting, which must be applied with soft brushes.

The mural is composed of three large sections, corresponding to the left side, central panel, and right side of the pharmacy, as seen from the entrance. The fragment on the left side is also known as "Homage to Medicine: Vaccination," (Homenaje a la medicina: la vacunación) while the right side is called "Homage to Medicine: Natural Medicine" (Homenaje a la medicina: medicina natural). Physically, the work is displayed above the pharmacy shelves, and it should be read in chronological order from left to right.

As with the rest of the artist's work, the presence of land labor and marginal trades occupy a prominent place.

=== Meaning ===
“The mural expresses a view of the time the artist is living in. The mural cannot be entirely decorative; it must reflect ideas.” —Julio Escámez, on muralism in general.

The mural as a whole symbolizes the various cultural, social, and temporal stages of the history of Chilean medicine.

The panel on the left side represents an idealization and synthesis of the relationship between man and nature, from which he extracts what is necessary for health and well-being in a rural setting. It begins with a Mapuche woman gathering medicinal herbs next to a boldo tree, through which the painter represents the healing methods of the Mapuche people, their customs, and healing rituals. Toward the center of the panel, a child with a chueca watches several horsemen riding toward a group of Mapuche people who are preparing for a celebration around a fire, getting ready to sacrifice an animal. The panel continues with a rehue, a type of totem used by the Mapuche for ceremonies, and ends with a group of rukas, their traditional homes made from straw, coligües (a type of bamboo), and tree trunks.

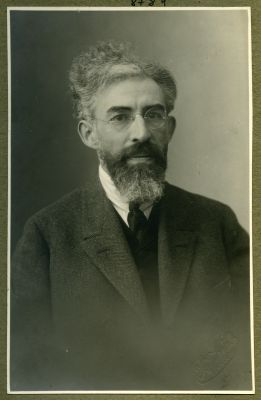
The physician Alejandro Lipschutz is depicted in the third panel of the work.

The central panel serves as a transition from rural to urban life, where human architecture is connected with the natural landscape. The tall walls in the panel represent the geographic boundaries between the new knowledge gained inside buildings and the natural knowledge of the indigenous world, which continues to develop outside. Thus, the panel is divided into two parts: on the left, showing the health methods used after the Conquest of Chile, during colonial times, exercised by priests through their purifying, monastic, and research practices of cloistered life; and on the right, where peasants organize to seek out a doctor to heal a sick person lying at the end of the hallway in a landowner’s house.

Finally, the panel on the right is dedicated to contemporary medicine, a result of the relationship between education, university research, and public work. The left side of the panel shows scientific studies and laboratory analyses, divided into two parts resembling the two floors of a university building, from whose windows teaching activities can be observed. On the first floor, next to a human anatomy chart, is Latvian doctor Alejandro Lipschutz, who served as a professor at the University of Concepción. On the second floor, in a chemistry lab, writer and pharmaceutical chemist Daniel Belmar gives a lecture. The center of the panel serves as a transition to the outside, on the right side, where the work concludes by depicting a vaccination session for women, men, and children, carried out by nurses. This panel represents Escámez's ideal of equal access to health benefits derived from education and scientific outreach processes.

The entire mural illustrates a transition between traditional medicine and the contemporary methods of allopathic pharmacy. Moreover, it offers a hopeful perspective, where urban medicine and its university development ensure the survival of the modern patient.

== See also ==
- Presencia de América Latina
