= Venturelli =

Venturelli is a surname. Notable people with the surname include:

- Fred Venturelli (1917–1990), American football placekicker
- José Venturelli (1924–1988), Chilean painter, engraver, and illustrator
- Romeo Venturelli (1938–2011), Italian racing cyclist
- Stefano Venturelli (born 1967), Italian judoka

== See also ==
- Meanings of minor planet names: 16001–17000#219
