= José Perotti Ronzoni =

Chilean sculptor and painter

José Luis Perotti Ronzoni
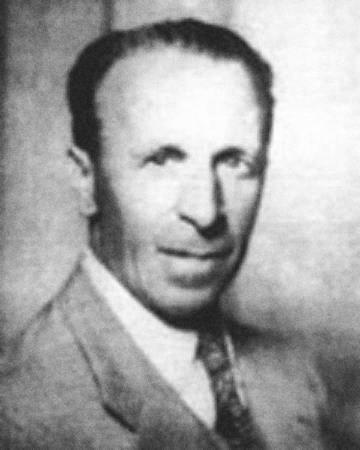
- Born: June 8, 1898; Santiago, Chile
- Died: June 22, 1956 (aged 58); Santiago, Chile
- Education: Chilean School of Fine Arts
- Occupations: Sculptor, Painter, Professor

José Luis Perotti Ronzoni (June 8, 1898 – June 22, 1956) was a Chilean artist and educator. His best known works are paintings and sculptures. He was one of the founders of the Chilean artists' collective Grupo Montparnasse.

== Studies ==
Perotti became a student at the University of Chile School of Fine Arts in 1917. He studied sculpture under Virginio Arias. He was elected president of the Student Center by his peers.

Perotti traveled on scholarship to Spain in 1920 to attend the Royal Academy of Fine Arts of San Fernando. There he learned sculpture under Miguel Blay, painting under Joaquín Sorolla, and drapery drawing under Julio Romero de Torres. He then moved to Paris in 1921 to study at the Académie de la Grande Chaumière. There he learned sculpture under Antoine Bourdelle.

While in Paris he attended classes with fellow Chilean painter Camilo Mori. When he returned to Chile in 1923 they founded the Montparnasse Group along with Luis Vargas Rosas, Henriette Petit, and Julio Ortíz de Zárate. The group held their first exhibition in 1923 in Santiago. This group was responsible for bringing the Parisian avant-garde movement to Chile.

== Career ==
Perotti was a drawing teacher at the Zenón Torrealba School for Workers. From 1927 to 1928 he was a professor of sculpture at the School of Fine Arts at the University of Chile. He then became chair of sculpture at the School of Decorative Arts. While there he added instruction in wrought iron techniques, bookbinding, poster design, and glass painting. He became the first director of the School of Applied Arts, taking over from Carlos Isamitt the founder of the school. Some sources say he became director in 1933, while others give 1930 as the year. He remained in the position until his death in 1956.

In 1931 he was one of a group who created the Chilean Artists Association. He also organized free workshops during his career. The training of craftspeople was important to Perotti. He felt that Chile needed people who could "make with art" rather than only having art that was purely art. He preferred working side by side with students to allow for an exchange of knowledge and an ongoing dialogue. His view of applied arts included teaching reproducibility of art, important in fields like ceramics and graphic arts, which placed him in opposition to those in the art world seeing only unique works as valid. Additionally he felt the boundary of art should go beyond the universities and specific intellectual circles. He focused on education and did not restrict his enrollment to those with great talent or those intending art as a profession. His views led to criticism from university authorities.

Perotti traveled to Germany in 1937. He received a Humboldt Foundation scholarship along with Samuel Román Rojas and Israel Roa. There he studied painting techniques, ceramics, and enameling on metals. This trip prompted his creation of the enameling on metals course at the School of Applied Arts.

In 1941 he was appointed curator of the Chilean Exhibition of Contemporary Art. The exhibit, which included his work, was shown at the Toledo Museum of Art, the San Francisco Museum of Modern Art, and other venues. During the nearly three year assignment he continued to create works and gave various lectures while traveling. While on this trip he taught a summer course at Mills College in California. He was joined by Antonio Sotomayor, a Bolivian born artist.

== Art ==
Perotti's work includes sculptures, paintings, drawings, ceramics, engravings, and enamels on metal, among other media. His drawings and sculptures were generally about the human figure while paintings focused on landscapes. He received the greatest recognition for his work in sculpture. Over the course of his career he experimented with the stylization of anthromorphic figures and use of space as a compositional element. He also used what he called "hollows", perforated volume which uses deliberate voids to allow light to flow through.

He has two stand out awards. He was awarded the first medal in the Sculpture Section of the Salon of 1919. This was for his work The Pariah. Then in 1953 he won the National Prize of Art of Chile. He was the first sculptor to receive the prize.

His art has been publicly displayed throughout Chile, as well as in the United States and Portugal.
