= José Venturelli =

Chilean artist

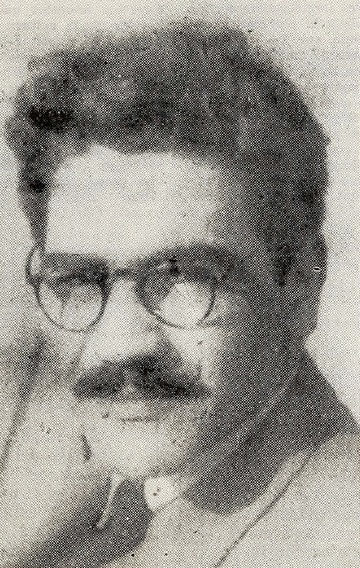
- Born: José Venturelli Eade; 25 March 1924; Santiago, Chile
- Died: 17 September 1988 (aged 64); Beijing, China
- Education: Escuela de Bellas Artes, Santiago
- Known for: Muralism
- Spouse: Delia Baraona Lagos (m. 1950–1988; her death)

José Venturelli Eade (25 March 1924 – 17 September 1988) was a Chilean painter, engraver and illustrator, best known for his work as a muralist.

Together with Julio Escámez, Fernando Daza Osorio and Pedro Olmos Muñoz among others, he is considered one of the main representatives of the Chilean muralist movement, largely influenced by Mexican muralism. His works are often characterized by an engagement of the social and political realities of his time, also linking him with other Chilean artists such as Carlos Hermosilla Álvarez and Pedro Lobos.

== Biography ==
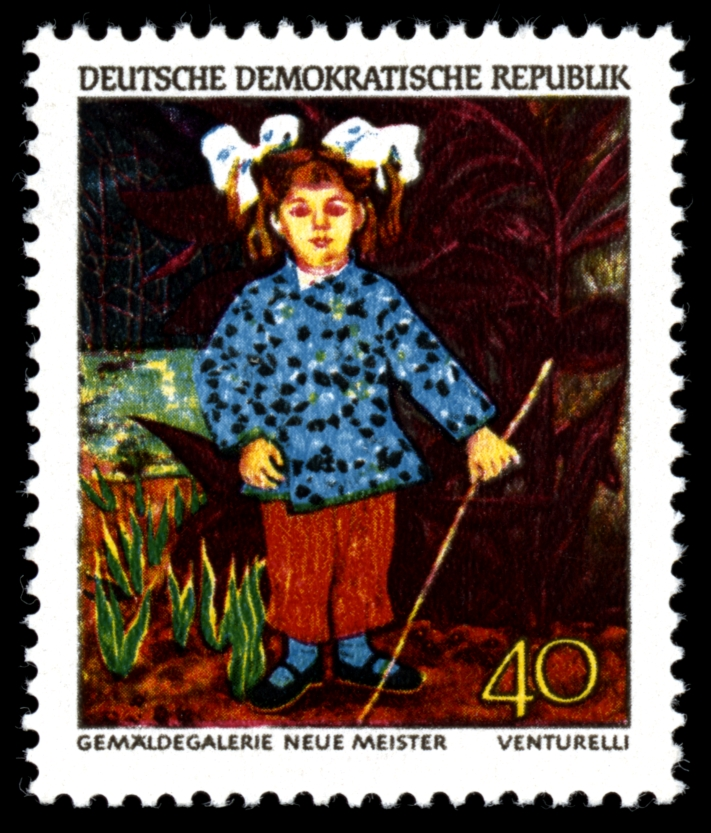
1968 stamp of the German Democratic Republic with a painting by Venturelli.

José Venturelli was born in Santiago. His father, Balilla Venturelli Carelli, was an Italian engineer who emigrated to Chile in the early 1920s, after facing persecution for his role in the founding of the Italian Socialist Party in the Lombardy region. His mother was Carmela Eade Carrasco, a Chilean of Dutch ancestry from Concepción. While José was a child, his father continued his political and union activities as an organizer of the Chilean section of the Industrial Workers of the World. For this reason, Balilla was arrested and sent into internal exile to Tierra Amarilla during the dictatorship of Carlos Ibáñez del Campo in the late 1920s.

In 1933, Venturelli began studying at the Instituto Nacional General José Miguel Carrera in Santiago, and in 1938 started attending evening courses at the School of Fine Arts of the University of Chile. There, he studied muralism under Laureano Ladrón de Guevara and engraving under Marco Bontá. He was also brought into contact with the Mexican muralist painter David Alfaro Siqueiros, who was visiting Chile for a cultural mission at the invitation of the Chilean government during this period. Venturelli soon became a friend and disciple of Siqueiros, and the two collaborated in the making of a series of murals called Muerte al invasor ("Death to the Invader") at the Escuela México in Chillán in 1941–42. In 1942, he entered the mural painting course at the School of Fine Arts as a full-time student, and the following year, he was given a scholarship to continue his studies in Brazil. He then returned to Chile for a few years, and contributed with illustrations to the first clandestine Chilean edition of Canto General by Pablo Neruda in 1950. In the same year, he also completed the mural América, no invoco tu nombre en vano ("America, I do not invoke your name in vain") for the Editorial Universitaria of the University of Chile.

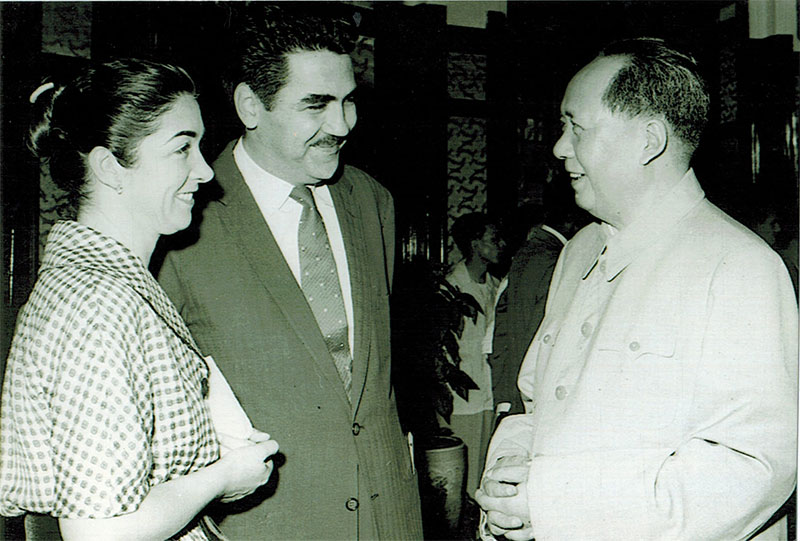
Venturelli and his spouse Delia Baraona meeting with Mao Zedong.

In the 1950s, Venturelli began a period of extensive travels in the Americas, Europe and Asia. In 1951, he participated in the 3rd World Festival of Youth and Students in Berlin, preparing the Latin American section of the International Exhibition of Arts held at the Akademie der Künste during the festival. In November of the same year, Venturelli also participated in a session of the World Peace Council held in Vienna, together with other Latin American representatives such as Pablo Neruda and Jorge Amado. There, he received an invitation to visit China, something which materialized in March 1952. During his time in China, Venturelli had the opportunity to meet with Mao Zedong and Zhou Enlai, and would also execute a mural depicting scenes from the Korean War at the headquarters of the Chinese section of the World Peace Council. After returning to Chile later that year, he was to set up a Chilean–Chinese Cultural Institute in Santiago, together with Pablo Neruda and Salvador Allende. Venturelli would return to China several times during the 1950s, enabling him to immerse himself in traditional oriental aesthetics and painting techniques. In 1954, he participated in a collective workshop at the Central Academy of Fine Arts in Beijing, and becoming friends with Chinese artists such as Qi Baishi, Fu Baoshi and Li Keran. Exhibitions of his works were held in Beijing and Berlin in 1955, Santiago and Buenos Aires in 1956, Concepción in 1957, Shanghai in 1958, and again in Santiago in 1959.

In 1959, after the Cuban Revolution, Venturelli visited Cuba for the first time. The following year, the revolutionary government invited him back to work on several murals in Havana. This led to the creation of the mural Homenaje a Camilo Cienfuegos ("Homage to Camilo Cienfuegos") at the Medical College of Havana, completed in 1962, and the mural Solidaridad ("Solidarity") at the Hotel Habana Libre, completed the following year. He was also commissioned by Che Guevara to create a mural at the building of the Ministry of Industries, which ultimately went unfinished. Together with fellow muralists Orlando Suárez and Amable Mouriño, Venturelli participated in the founding of the Experimental Graphics Workshop in Havana in 1962.

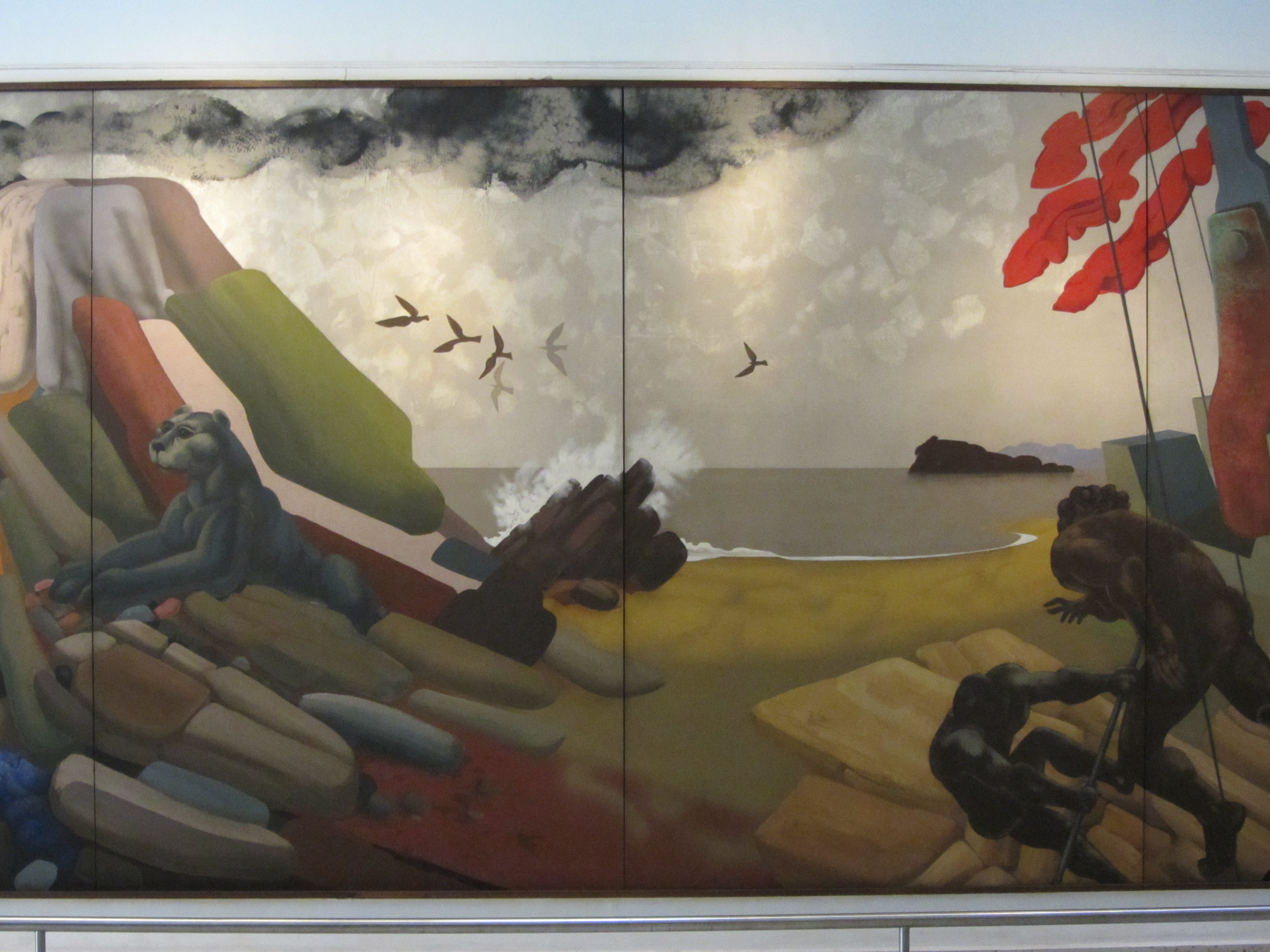
Detail of the mural Chile (1972) at the Centro Cultural Gabriela Mistral, Santiago.

During the time of the left-wing Popular Unity government in the early 1970s, several public murals by Venturelli were inaugurated in his hometown of Santiago: in 1970 the murals Al transformar la naturaleza el hombre se transforma a sí mismo ("By transforming nature, man transforms himself") and Homenaje al trabajador ("Homage to the worker") at the campus of the National Institute of Professional Training (INACAP) in Renca commune, and in 1972 the mural Chile, in the building prepared for the third UNCTAD conference which was held in Santiago the same year (currently the Centro Cultural Gabriela Mistral). Venturelli was in China during the 1973 Chilean coup d'état; his workshop in Santiago was raided and looted during the coup. The coup and the military dictatorship of Augusto Pinochet that followed forced Venturelli into exile, and in 1974 he settled in Geneva, Switzerland with his family. Several of his artworks from this period deal with the dictatorship and its human rights violations; one prominent example is Patria negra y roja ("Black and red motherland"), a series of black and white engravings completed in 1975. In 1984, a mural was inaugurated at the École de Balexert in Geneva. During the 1980s, Venturelli's health deteriorated, and in August 1988 he travelled to China for medical treatment; he died in Beijing the following month.
