= Museum of Cultures =

Museum of Cultures may refer to:

- Museum of Cultures (Basel), in the city of Basel, Switzerland
- Museum of Cultures (Lugano), in the city of Lugano, Switzerland
- Museum of Cultures (Mexico), in Mexico City, Mexico
- Museum of Cultures (Milan) (MUDEC), in Milan, Italy
- Indira Gandhi Rashtriya Manav Sangrahalaya, Bhopal, Madhya Pradesh, India
