= Ana Cortés =

Chilean painter

- Born: Ana Emma del Rosario Cortés Jullian; 24 August 1895; Santiago
- Died: 5 January 1998 (aged 102)
- Education: University of Chile
- Website: www.anacortes.cl (in Spanish)

Ana Emma del Rosario Cortés Jullian, more commonly known as Ana Cortés (24 August 1895 – 5 January 1998), was a Chilean painter of the Grupo Montparnasse. In 1974, she won the National Prize of Art of Chile, making her the first painter to do so.

== Biography ==
Ana Cortés was born in Santiago, Chile on 24 August 1895, the third of seven children of Ernesto Cortés Ramirez and Ana Jullian Chesi. She studied in the home of Madame Lasaulce as a child, then lived for three years in Paris with her godparents, Alejandro Bertrand and Mercedes Vidal. Returning to Chile, she completed her studies at La Serena High School. In 1919, Cortés enrolled in the University of Chile's School of Fine Arts and was taught by Frenchmen Juan Francisco González and Ricardo Richon-Brunet. This would have an important effect on her career. She returned to Paris in 1925 to study at the Académie de la Grande Chaumière under André Lhote for the next two years and that same year entered the Académie Colarossi. Cortés would spend the next three years in Europe, touring museums in Italy, France, Spain, Switzerland, and Belgium, and became inspired by the abstract works of the School of Paris. In 1927, her work was exhibited at the Salon d'Automne.

In 1928, Cortés returned to Chile and joined the teaching staff of the University of Chile as its first female professor. She stayed for three decades.

In 2015, she had a solo exhibition of over thirty paintings and drawings at the National Museum of Fine Arts.

Currently, her work is on display at the Museo Bellas Artes de Valparaíso.
