= Graciela Aranis =

Chilean painter & cartoonist (1908–1996)

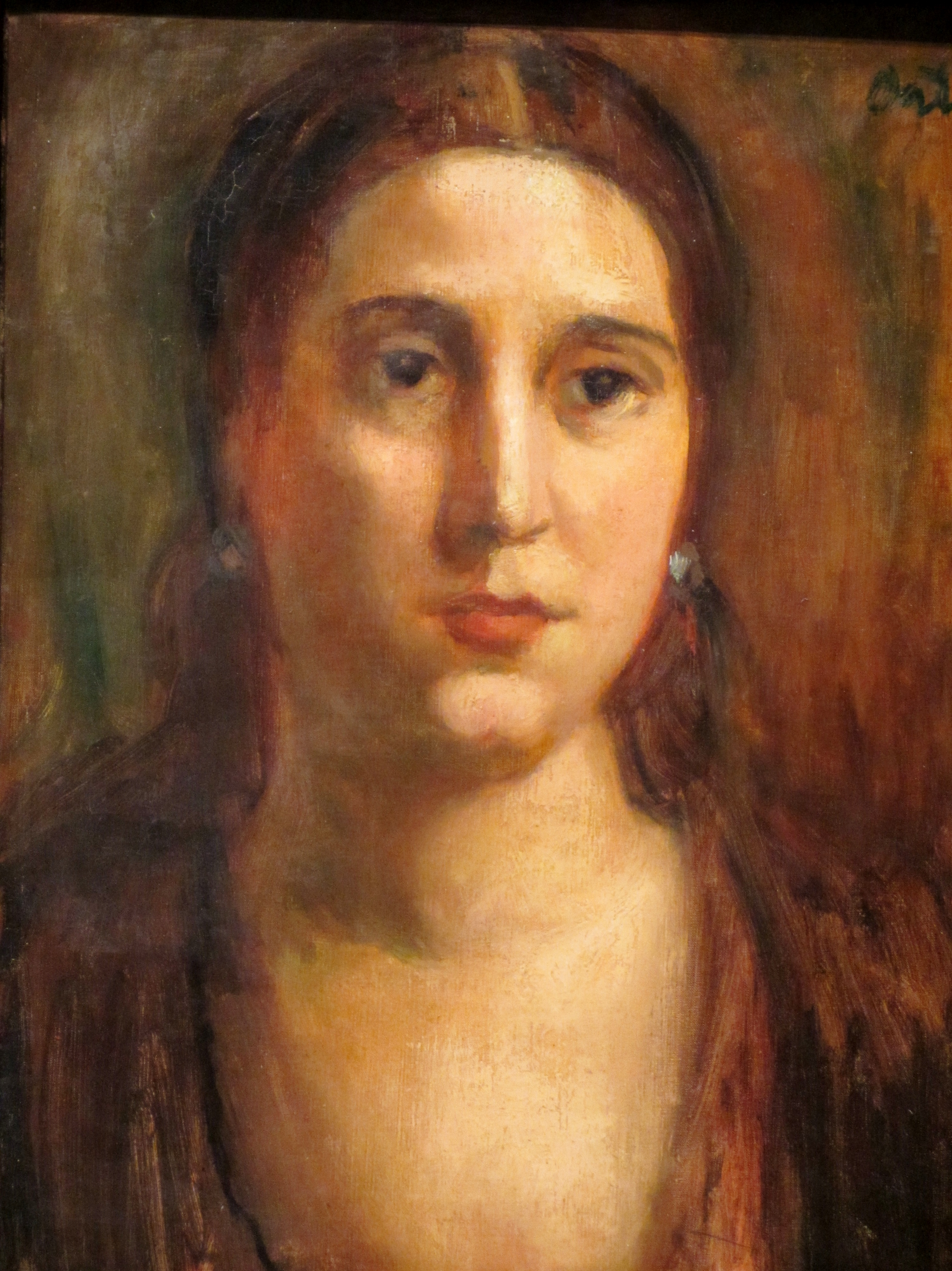
- Portrait of Aranís by Manuel Ortíz de Zárate, c. 1927
- Born: 6 October 1908; Santiago, Chile
- Died: 12 December 1996 (aged 88); Bern, Switzerland
- Education: University of Chile; Académie Scandinave
- Movement: Generación del 28; Grupo Montparnasse
- Spouse: Serge Brignoni

Graciela Aranis (6 October 1908 – 12 December 1996), known professionally as Chela Aranís, was a Chilean painter and cartoonist. A representative of the "Generación del 28", Aranis was a member of the Grupo Montparnasse.

== Biography ==
Graciela Aranis was born in Santiago, October 6, 1908. She was the daughter of Pedro Aranís and Eduvigis Valdivia.

She studied at the School of Fine Arts of the University of Chile, where she was a student of Ricardo Richon Brunet, María Aranis, and Juan Francisco González, and at the Académie Scandinave, where she studied under the tutelage of André Lhote and Marcel-Lenoir. At the beginning of her career, her work was characterized "by an opaque and dark color, influenced by the dramatic spirits of the time, and then in Paris, the artist was able to release her plastic vision towards the spontaneous expression of form and color".

Aranis participated in several individual and group exhibitions during her career, including those held at the Official Hall of Santiago in 1922, 1923, 1924, 1927, 1928, 1929 and 1939; at the Ibero-American Exhibition of Seville (1929); at the II São Paulo Art Biennial (1953); the exhibition La mujer en el arte at the Chilean National Museum of Fine Arts (1975); among several others in Chile, Switzerland, the United States and Brazil. She was married to the Swiss artist Serge Brignoni. She died in Bern, Switzerland, December 12, 1996.
