= Ladrón de Guevara =

Ladrón de Guevara is a Spanish-language compound surname.

Notable people with the surname include:

First surname:

- Anjulí Ladrón de Guevara (born 1986), Mexican sportswoman
- Diego Ladrón de Guevara (1641–1718) Spanish bishop and viceroy of Peru
- Héctor Ladrón de Guevara (1940–2024), Peruvian footballer
- Laureano Ladrón de Guevara (1889–1968), Chilean painter and printmaker
- María Fernanda Ladrón de Guevara (1897–1974), Spanish actress, advertised Heno de Pravia soap
- Matilde Ladrón de Guevara (1910–2009), Chilean poet
- Norberto Ladrón de Guevara (1892–1969), Chilean politician and national-team footballer
- Norma Angélica Ladrón de Guevara (1937– 1962), Mexican actress
- Rafael Ladrón de Guevara (born 1952), Spanish competitive cyclist

Second surname:

- Agustín Moreno Ladrón de Guevara (1879–1964), Chilean Army general
- Amparo Rivelles Ladrón de Guevara (1925–2013), Spanish actress
- Carlos J. Meneses Ladrón de Guevara (1863–1929), Mexican pianist and conductor, taught Alba Herrera y Ogazón
- Carlos Larrañaga Ladrón de Guevara (1937–2012), Spanish actor
- Diana Bernal Ladrón de Guevara (born 1957), Mexican jurist and politician
- Íñigo Manuel Vélez Ladrón de Guevara (1642–1699), Spanish nobleman
- José García Ladrón de Guevara (1929–2019), Spanish poet and politician
- Manuel Huerta Ladrón de Guevara (born 1960), Mexican politician
- Pedro Pacheco Ladrón de Guevara (1488–1560), Spanish cardinal and viceroy of Naples
- Trinidad María Enríquez Ladrón de Guevara (1846–1891), Peruvian teacher
