= Pedro de la Barra =

Chilean theatre director

Pedro de la Barra García
- Born: 23 October 1912; Santiago, Chile
- Died: 6 July 1977 (aged 64); Caracas, Venezuela
- Education: University of Chile
- Occupation: Theatre director
- Children: Alejandro de la Barra Villarroel; Pablo de la Barra

Pedro de la Barra (23 October 1912 – 6 July 1977) was a Chilean theatre director. He won the National Prize of Art of Chile in 1952.
