= Julio Escámez =

Chilean painter, engraver and muralist (1925–2015)

- Born: November 15, 1925; Antihuala, Los Álamos, Chile
- Died: December 23, 2015 (90 years old); Heredia, Costa Rica
- Education: Adolfo Berchenko Academy of Fine Arts, Concepción; School of Fine Arts and School of Applied Arts, University of Chile; Academy of Fine Arts of Florence; Patrice Lumumba University; Academy of fine arts in Düsseldorf; Vienna Museum of Art History; Student of: Gregorio de la Fuente and Laureano Ladrón de Guevara
- Occupations: Painter, Engraver, Illustrator and Scenographer
- Style: Folklore
- Awards: Municipal Art Prize 1956 (Concepción, Chile)

Julio Escámez Carrasco (November 15, 1925 – December 23, 2015) was a Chilean painter, engraver and muralist. His work includes numerous frescoes, oil paintings and engravings (lithography, woodcut and etching) produced both in Chile and abroad.

He also designed scenography and made costumes for various ballet works, and had an outstanding career as a book illustrator from diverse writers, including the poet Pablo Neruda, whom he met personally.

Along with other renowned painters such as Gregorio de la Fuente, with whom he collaborated in his youth for the creation of the mural Historia de Concepción, he belonged to the school of muralists of Chile.

== Biography ==
=== Studies in Chile and abroad ===
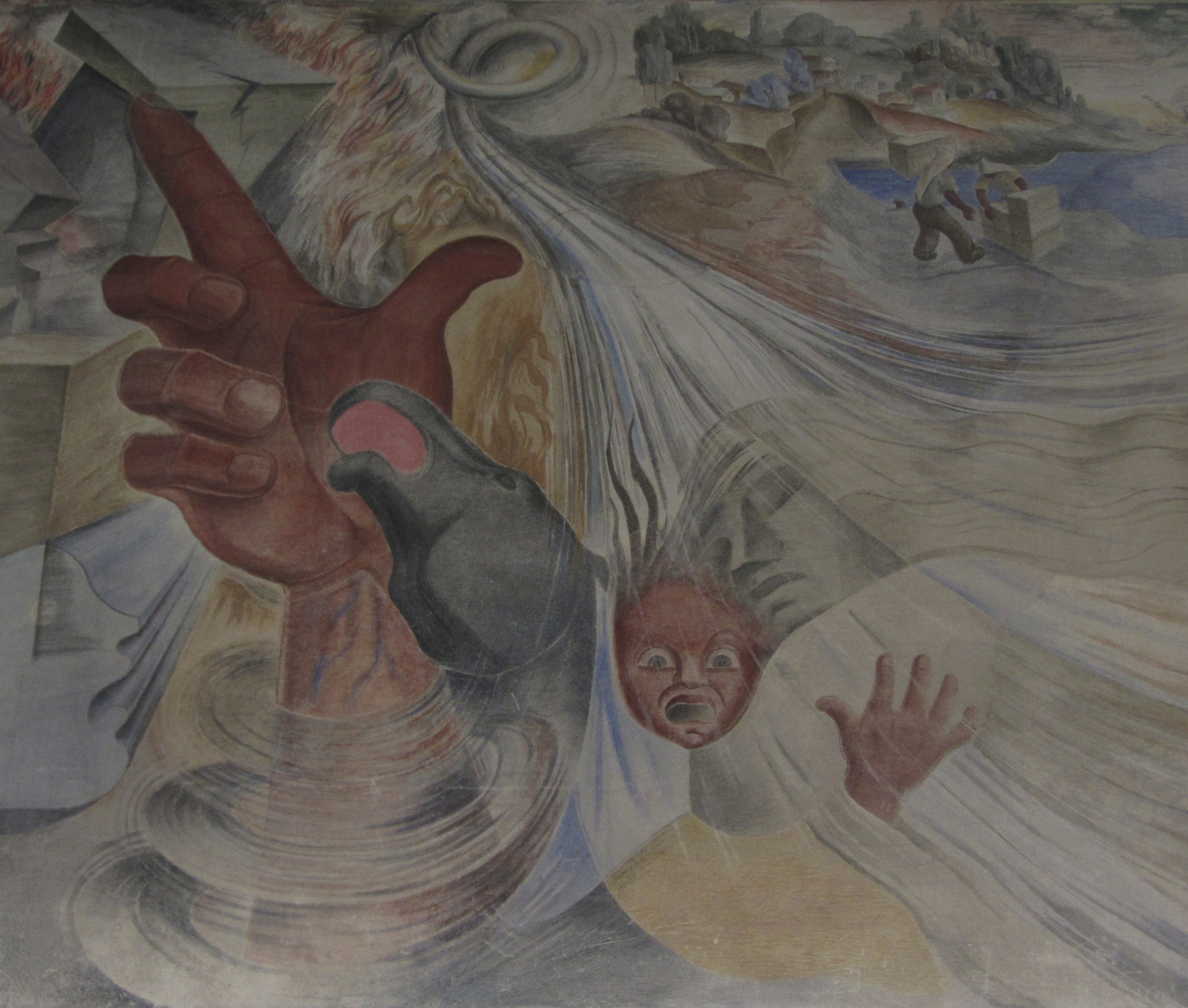
Detail of the mural Historia de Concepción by Gregorio de la Fuente, in which Escámez collaborated during its creation, between 1943 and 1946.

While still a teenager, he began his painting studies at the Adolfo Berchenko Academy of Fine Arts, located in Concepción, where he was also initiated in the performing arts. In 1943 he was chosen from among the different students of the academy, along with Sergio Sotomayor, as assistant to the muralist and painter Gregorio de la Fuente for the prestigious mural Historia de Concepción (1943-1946), located in the former Central Station of Concepción, considered "treasure of the Civic Quarter", and declared a Historic Monument of Chile.

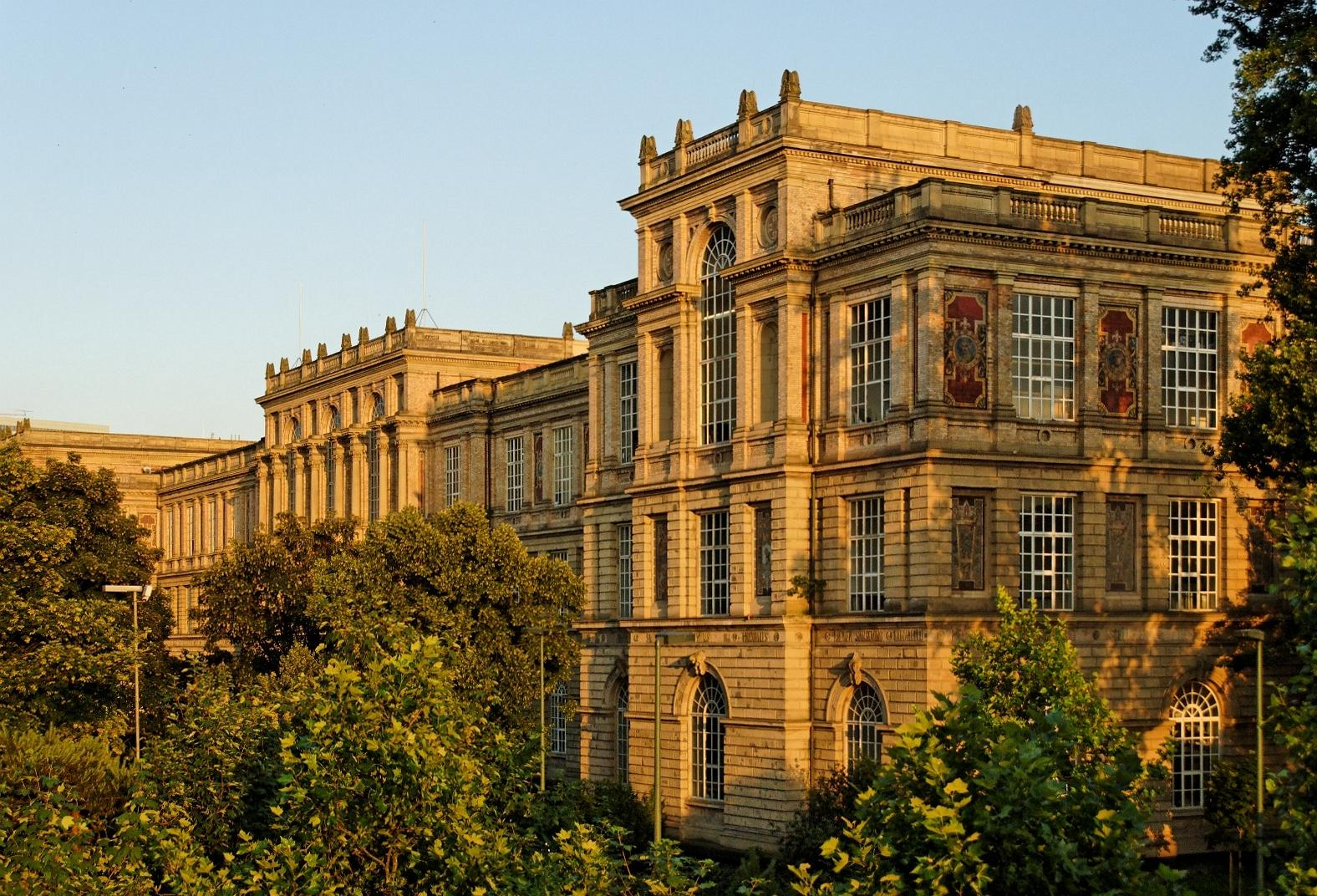
Academy of Fine Arts in Düsseldorf, Germany.

Later he moved to Santiago, where he continued his art studies at the School of Fine Arts and School of Applied Arts of the University of Chile, where he had as teachers Laureano Guevara in Mural Painting, Marco Antonio Bontá in Graphic Arts, Gregorio de la Fuente himself and Israel Roa.

Once back in Concepción, he worked as a professor of engraving and mural painting at the Academia Vespertina de Concepción. But Escámez, who was interested in pre-Columbian culture, decided to travel to Peru and Bolivia, a trip that lasted until 1953, when he returned to Chile and was hired as a professor of Mural Painting at the Art Institute of the University of Concepción, where he also taught easel painting, ceramics, engraving and drawing.

Between 1955 and 1957 he went to study with a scholarship to the Academy of Fine Arts in Florence, Italy, the mural technique of fresco, especially the painting of the fourteenth and sixteenth centuries by Giotto and Piero della Francesca. He then continued studying at the academy of fine arts in Düsseldorf, Germany, where he worked in Graphic Arts and Painting Technology, and later continued studying at the Vienna museum of art history, Austria. In addition, he also studied at the Patrice Lumumba University in Moscow, and during these years he was invited to Russia, China, Japan and India, countries where he exhibited his works.

=== Exile in Costa Rica ===
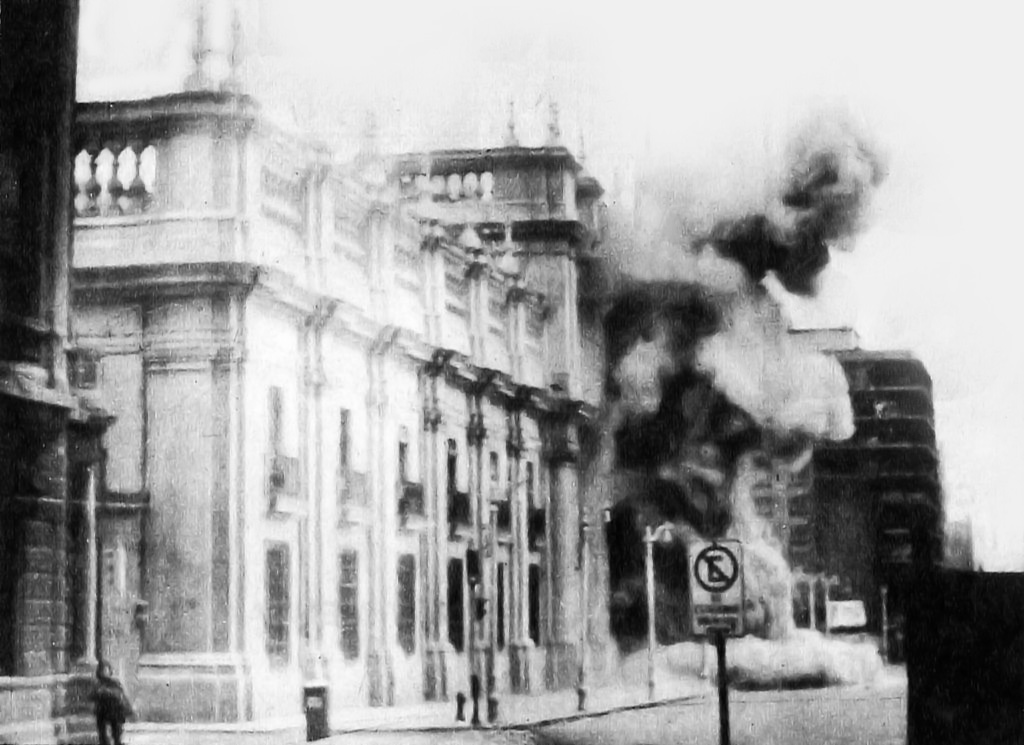
After the 1973 coup d'état in Chile, Escámez went into exile in Costa Rica and part of his work was lost. In the photograph, the bombing of the Palacio de La Moneda.

Once back in Chile, after the 1973 coup d'état that initiated the military dictatorship, the painter fled into self-exile, settling in San José, capital of Costa Rica. During his absence, part of Escámez's work was abandoned, deteriorated or destroyed. In 1974 a mural of his in the session hall of the municipality of Chillán was covered with paint, being censored by the military of his country. The following year, the old Enrique Molina Garmendia High School was demolished, and with it his fresco El hombre ante el micro y macrocosmos was destroyed. His murals Historia de la medicina y la farmacia en Chile (History of Medicine and Pharmacy in Chile) and Historia de Lota (History of Lota) were damaged when people without the necessary skills and knowledge tried to restore them.

In Costa Rica, the artist worked from 1974 as a professor at the School of Plastic Arts of the National University of Costa Rica, located in Heredia, in the subjects of Aesthetics and Graphic Techniques. He is also an ad honorem advisor to the Ministry of Culture for the restoration and conservation of national monuments, carrying out important works and conservation work for the Costa Rican Museum of Art, in addition to dedicating himself to the performing arts, taking up a discipline he had already experimented with in Concepción, highlighting his stagings of works by Miguel de Cervantes, William Shakespeare and Bocaccio Casona, as well as others carried out for the National Ballet of Costa Rica.

In addition, Escámez worked as an illustrator and art theorist for university publications and books by various authors.

== Work ==
=== Style ===
"The mural expresses a look at the time the artist is living in, the mural cannot be entirely decorative, it has to reflect ideas."

— Julio Escámez.

The work of Julio Escámez belongs to the current of realism with a strong social content, dealing with themes of popular everyday life and the American landscape. Some of his works, such as the mural located in Concepción Historia de la medicina y la farmacia en Chile (1957-1958) belong to the so-called social realism, initiated in that area by Gregorio de la Fuente, but replacing the symbolism used by De la Fuente with a more descriptive and anecdotal style. Some of his large-format oil paintings, on the other hand, are influenced by magical realism.

His mural painting is strongly influenced by Mexican muralism, particularly that of David Alfaro Siqueiros and Diego Rivera. In his murals he often criticizes the spiritual crisis generated by industrialization, as well as other conflicts of modern man. An example of this is his mural De principio a fin, located in Chillán. His recurring themes are the sense of identity, respect for the idiosyncrasy and concerns of the people, work rooted in the land and mineral exploitation, as in the case of his mural Historia de Lota, where he depicts the exploitation of coal in the city of Lota.

=== Individual exhibitions ===
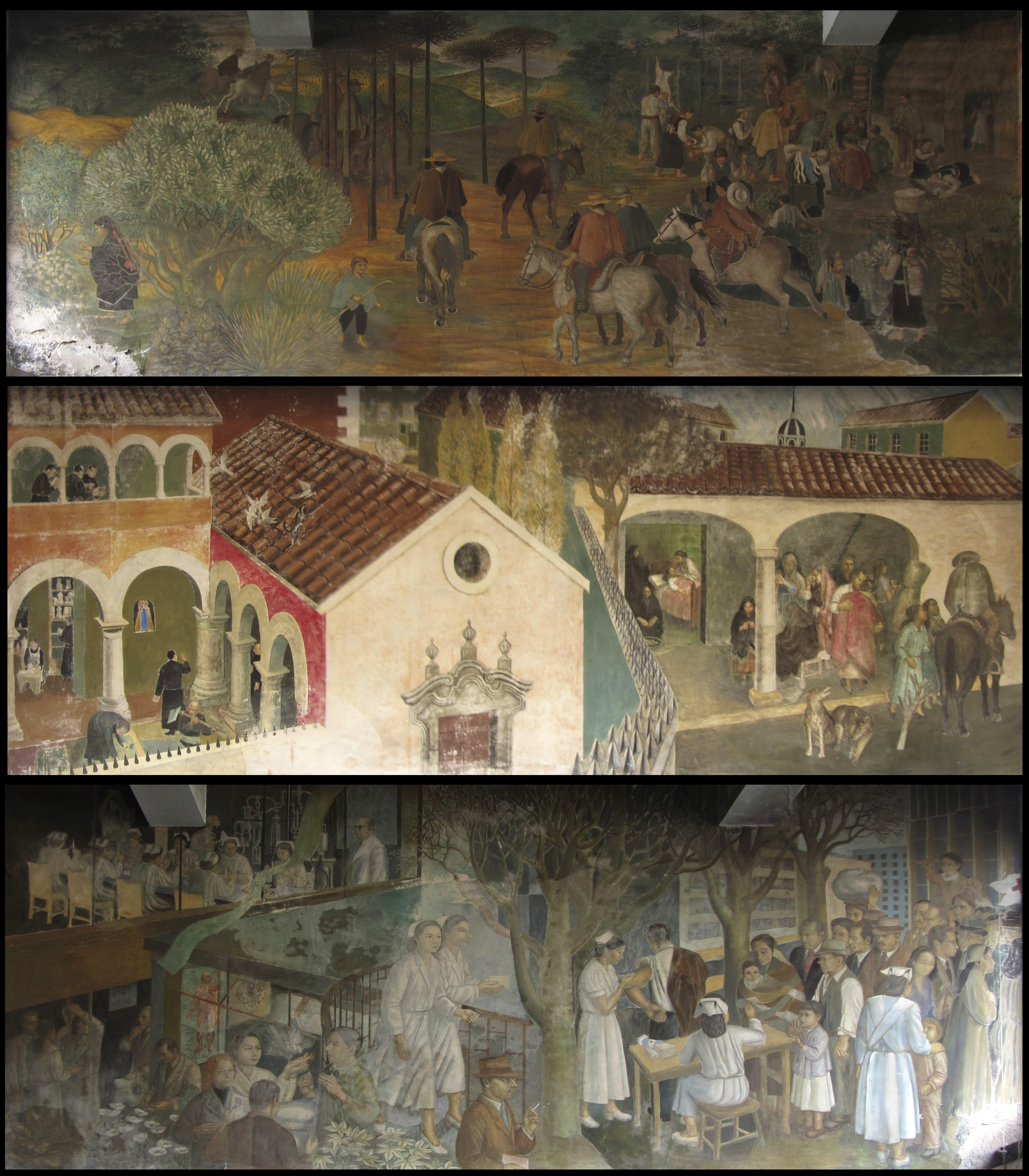
Mural Historia de la medicina y la farmacia en Chile (1957-1958), an example of social realism in the work of Julio Escámez.

- 1959 - Bharatieja Uitya Bhranau Cultural Institute, New Delhi, India.
- 1959 - University of Tokyo, Japan.
- 1969 - Escámez Drawings. National Museum of Fine Arts, Santiago, Chile.
- 1972 - Mural De principio a fin del Salón de Honor de la Municipalidad de Chillán, Chile.
- 1978 - El Caballo Verde Art Gallery, Concepción, Chile.
- 1988 - El Caballo Verde Art Gallery, Concepción, Chile.
- 1988 - Drawings and Engravings by Julio Escámez. Modern School of Music, Santiago.
- 1996 - Retrospective of Paintings, Drawings and Engravings. National Museum of Fine Arts, Santiago.
- 1996 - Engravings at El Caballo Verde Art Gallery, Concepción, Chile.
- 1997 - Julio Escamez, Paintings. El Caballo Verde Art Gallery, Concepción, Chile.
- 2001 - The Fronda Florida. Julio Escamez Exhibition. Chilean-North American Institute of Culture. Concepcion. Concepción, Chile.
- 2007 - Paintings and Drawings. Codelco Cultural Gallery, Santiago, Chile.

=== Collective exhibitions ===
- 1954 - Exhibition Homage to Pablo Neruda. Scenes of Chile. National Museum of Fine Arts, Santiago.
- 1955 - One Hundred Years of Chilean Painting. Exhibition Hall of the Journalists Circle, Santiago.
- 1956 - Contemporary Art of Chile. Carnegie International Center, United States.
- 1960 - Exhibition of Chilean Engravings. Lima Art Museum, Peru.
- 1963 - First American Biennial of Engraving. Museum of Contemporary Art, Santiago, Chile.
- 1970 - Collective Exhibition. Concepcion, Chile.
- 1970 - Contemporary Chilean Engraving. Casa de la Cultura Jalisciense, Jalisco, Mexico.
- 1971 - Collective Chile-Cuba. Museum of Contemporary Art, University of Chile, Santiago.
- 1972 - 150 Years of Chilean Painting. Museo Nacional de Bellas Artes, Buenos Aires, Argentina.
- 1974 - Drawings and Prints of the Museum of Contemporary Art. University of Chile, Santiago.
- 1976 - Century and a Half of Chilean Painting. Las Condes Cultural Institute, Santiago.
- 1976 - Museum of Contemporary Art. University of Chile, Santiago.
- 1988 - Three Centuries of Drawing in Chile, Germán Vergara Donoso Collection of the National Historical Museum. Las Condes Cultural Institute, Santiago, Chile.
- 1989 - 20th Century Plastic Arts. Municipal Casino of Viña del Mar, Chile.
- 1990 - Municipal Art Awards. Pontifical Catholic University of Chile, Regional Office Talcahuano, Chile.
- 1994 - Realisms in Chilean Painting (XX Century). Cultural Institute of Providencia, Santiago.
- 1995 - Illustrated Book Covers Exhibition, Universidad Mayor Used Book Fair. Santiago, Chile.
- 2000 - Chile One Hundred Years Visual Arts: First Period (1900 - 1950) Model and Representation. National Museum of Fine Arts, Santiago.
- 2000 - Chile One Hundred Years Visual Arts: Second Period (1950 - 1973) Between Modernity and Utopia. National Museum of Fine Arts, Santiago.

=== Works in permanent exhibition ===
- Fonda de fiesta. Oil on canvas, 80×100 cm. National Museum of Fine Arts. Santiago, Chile.
- Girl from the South (1951). Woodcut, paper, 41×57 cm. Museum of Contemporary Art. University of Chile, Santiago, Chile.
- Man before the micro and macrocosm. Former Enrique Molina Garmendia High School, Concepción, Chile (destroyed in 1975).
- Children and sunflowers. Oil on canvas, 152×110 cm. Casa del Arte of the University of Concepción, Chile.
- History of medicine and pharmacy in Chile (1957-1958). Fresco mural. Maluje Pharmacy, Concepción, Chile.
- De principio a fin. Mural. Municipality of Chillán, Chile (destroyed in 1974).
- History of Lota. Mural. Mexico de Lota School, Lota, Chile.
- National Insurance Institute Building, Costa Rica.

=== Awards ===
- 1956 - Municipal Art Award (Concepción, Chile)

== See also ==
- Gregorio de la Fuente
- Historia de la medicina y la farmacia en Chile
