= Henriette Petit =

Chilean painter

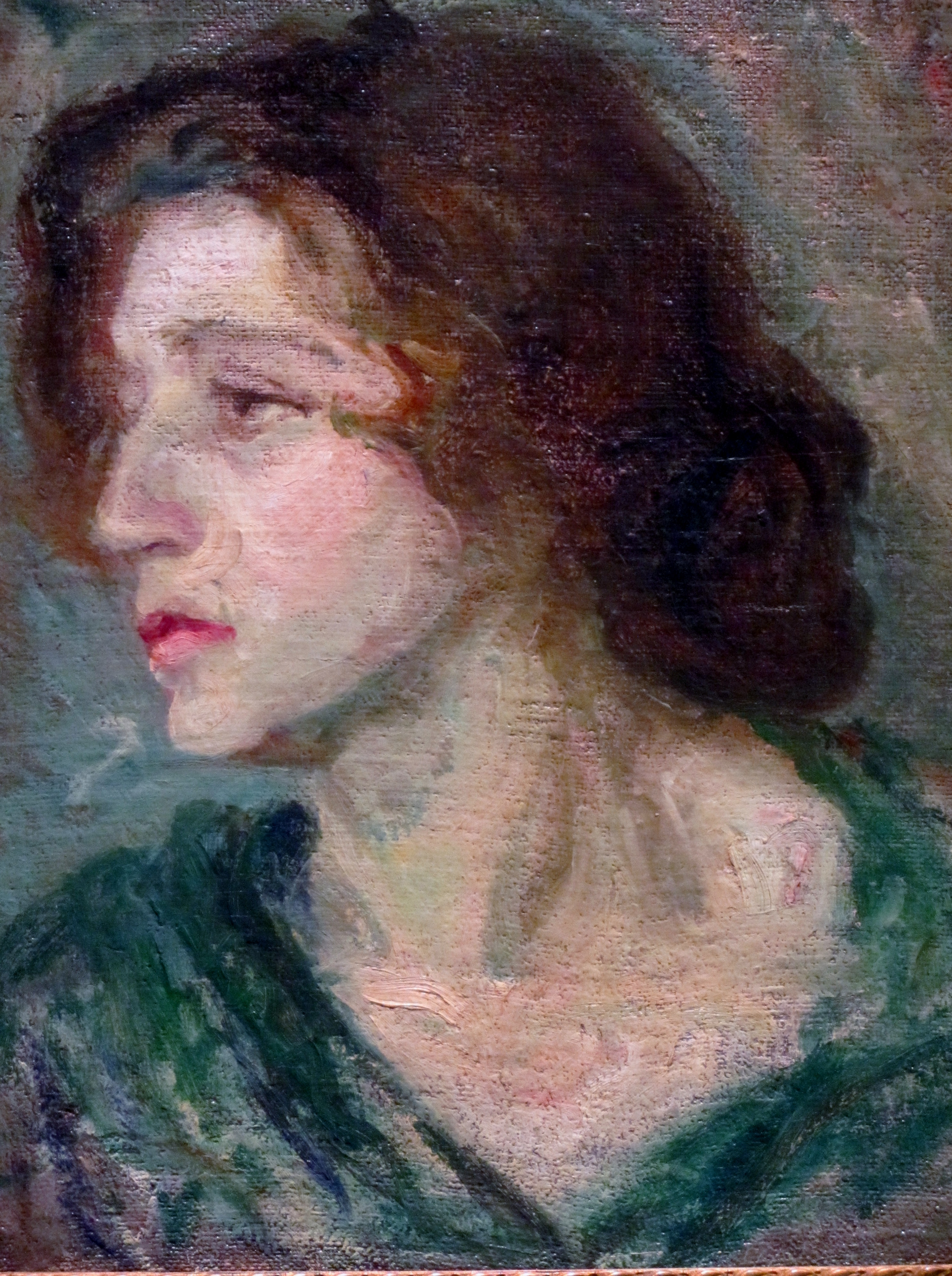
- Juan Francisco González (before 1933) Retrato de Henriette
- Born: Ana Enriqueta Petit Marfán; 3 March 1894; Santiago, Chile
- Died: 9 December 1983 (aged 89); Santiago, Chile
- Movement: Grupo Montparnasse
- Spouse: Luis Vargas Rosas (m. 1927; died 1977)
- Relatives: Magdalena Petit (sister)

Ana Enriqueta Petit Marfan (3 March 1894 – 9 December 1983), known by the pseudonym Henriette Petit, was a Chilean painter and co-founder of the Grupo Montparnasse.

== Biography ==
Ana Enriqueta Petit Marfan was born on 3 March 1894 in Santiago to Emilio Petit Pinaud, a French-born physician, and María Laura Marfán Montel. Petit was the older sister of the painter Magdalena Petit.

She began her career in the early 1910s, when she became a disciple of Juan Francisco González -considered one of the four "great masters of Chilean painting"- whom she met through her friend, the also painter, Marta Villanueva. Petit entered the School of Fine Arts in 1914, and two years later, she painted her first painting.

She traveled to Europe with her family between 1920 and 1921, a period in which she had classes in Paris, France, with the sculptor Antoine Bourdelle, who would portray her in a bust entitled Le Chilienne and whose works are in the artist's museum.

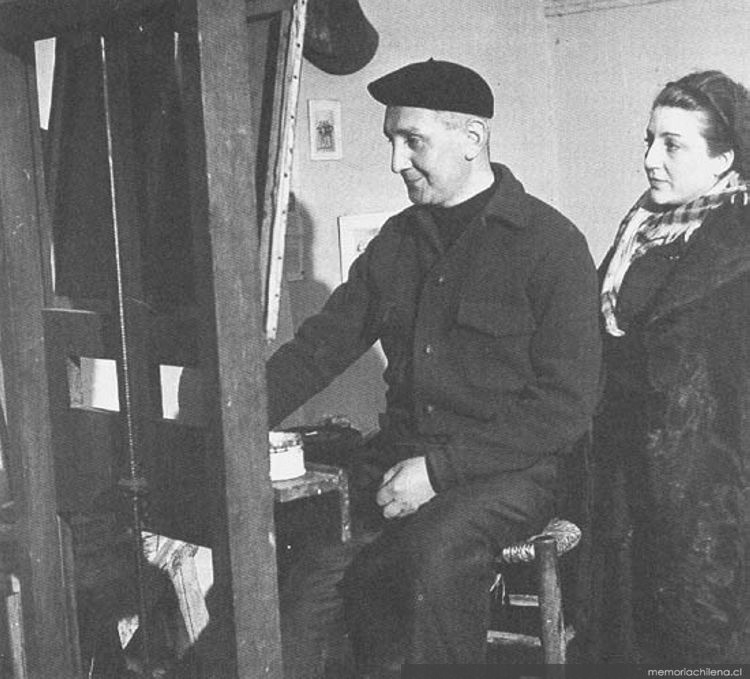
Luis Vargas Rosas and Henriette Petit (1927)

In 1923, back in Chile, Petit joined the Montparnasse group, an avant-garde movement of influences from Post-Impressionism and Fauvism. The group included José Perotti and the brothers Julio and Manuel Ortíz de Zárate, as well as Luis Vargas Rosas. Petit and Vargas Rosa married in 1927, with the poet Vicente Huidobro as best man.

In 1926, Petit settled in Paris, where she continued to specialize in sketches, drawing and painting, and joined the artistic environment which she shared with, among others, the French Le Corbusier and Fernand Léger, the Spanish Juan Gris, Joan Miró and Pablo Picasso, the British William Hayter and the American Alexander Calder. In the French capital, in addition to dedicating herself to painting, she worked at the Henri-Rousselle psychiatric hospital.

Petit and Vargas Rosas returned to Chile in 1941, due to World War II. Petit's artistic production declined notably due to the uprooting caused by being away from France. Her last trip to the Gallic country was in 1963.

On 9 December 1983 Petit died in Santiago, aged 89.

== Works ==
- Dos desnudos
- Isla de Maipo
- Resignación

== Bibliography ==
- Quiroga, Samuel. "El rol de Henriette Petit en las artes visuales a comienzos del siglo XX". En: Torres, Tarik (Coordinador). Estudios del abordaje multidisciplinario del arte. México: Ediciones Eón, 2017, pp. 71 – 83. (in Spanish)
