= National Prize of Art of Chile =

Art award in Chile (1942–1990)

The National Prize of Art of Chile, was created on November 9, 1942 by Law No. 7,368.

It was first awarded in 1944 and then given annually until 1990. The award alternated the mention among Painting or Sculpture, Music, and Theatre. In 1992 the award was divided into different artistic disciplines. Rather than one National Prize of Chile for art it was split into the National Prize for Plastic Arts, Musical Arts and Performing and Audiovisual Arts.

== List of prizewinners with the National Prize of Art ==
- 1944 - Pablo Burchard Eggeling - Painting
- 1945 - Pedro Humberto Allende - Music
- 1946 - Alejandro Flores Pinaud - Theatre
- 1947 - Pedro Reszka Moreau - Painting
- 1948 - Enrique Soro Barriga - Music
- 1949 - Rafael Frontaura de la Fuente - Theatre
- 1949 - Laura Rodig - Painting
- 1950 - Camilo Mori Serrano - Painting
- 1951 - Domingo Santa Cruz Wilson - Music
- 1952 - Pedro de la Barra - Theatre
- 1953 - José Perotti Ronzoni - Sculpture
- 1954 - Próspero Bisquertt Prado - Music
- 1955 - Américo Vargas Vergara - Theatre
- 1956 - José Caracci Vignatti - Painting
- 1957 - Alfonso Leng - Music
- 1958 - Jorge Quevedo Troncoso - Theatre
- 1959 - Benito Rebolledo Correa - Painting
- 1960 - Acario Cotapos Baeza - Music
- 1961 - José Rojas Ibarra - Theatre
- 1962 - Not awarded
- 1963 - Not awarded
- 1964 - Samuel Román Rojas - Sculpture
- 1965 - Carlos Isamitt Alarcón - Music
- 1966 - Pedro Sienna - Theatre
- 1967 - Laureano Ladrón de Guevara - Painting
- 1968 - Alfonso Letelier - Music
- 1969 - Ana González - Theatre
- 1970 - Marta Colvin - Sculpture
- 1971 - Gustavo Becerra-Schmidt - Music
- 1972 - Agustín Siré Sinobas - Music
- 1973 - Not awarded
- 1974 - Ana Cortés - Painting
- 1975 - Not awarded
- 1976 - Jorge Urrutia Blondel - Music
- 1977 - Not awarded
- 1978 - Pedro Mortheiru Salgado - Theatre
- 1979 - Carlos Pedraza Olguín - Painting
- 1980 - Víctor Tevah Tellias - Music
- 1981 - Fernando Debesa Marín - Theatre
- 1982 - Mario Carreño Morales - Painting
- 1983 - Claudio Arrau - Music
- 1984 - Ernst Uthoff Biefang - Ballet
- 1985 - Israel Roa Villagra - Painting
- 1986 - Federico Heinlein - Music
- 1988 - Silvia Piñeiro Rodríguez - Theatre
- 1990 - Roberto Matta - Painting
