= Chilean National Ballet =

Chilean contemporary dance company

General information
- Name: Chilean National Ballet
- Year founded: 1945
- Principal venue: University of Chile Theatre
- Website: Official Website

Senior staff
- Director: Gigi Caciuleanu

Other
- Official school: School of Dance, University of Chile
- Formation: Principal; Soloist; Corps de Ballet

The Chilean National Ballet, founded in 1945, is Chile's oldest professional contemporary dance company. It is based at the University of Chile in Santiago, Chile.

== History ==
Germany's Kurt Jooss Ballet company toured South America in 1941, including Santiago, Chile. The Institute of Musical Activities at the University of Chile approached some of the Jooss company's dancers about establishing a dance school at the University of Chile in Santiago. Ernst Uthoff left the Kurt Jooss Ballet to remain in Santiago, establishing a School of Dance at the university. Uthoff was the dance school's director, choreographer, and first master teacher. Along with Uthoff, Lola Botka and Rudolf Pescht left the Jooss company to join the School of Dance as master teachers. A Ballet Corps was eventually added, and under the name the Chilean National Ballet, the company debuted in 1945 with a production of Léo Delibes's Coppelia.

During its history, the company has performed over 200 works. It tours internationally, most extensively to Latin American venues.

== See also ==
- Culture of Chile
- Ballet
