= José Caracci Vignatti =

Italian-born Chilean painter (1887–1979)

- Born: July 23, 1887; Frascati, Italy
- Died: December 11, 1979 (aged 92); Santiago, Chile
- Education: University of Chile
- Occupation: Painter

José Caracci Vignatti (July 23, 1887 – December 11, 1979) was an Italian-born Chilean painter. He won the National Prize of Art of Chile in 1956.
