= Ernst Uthoff Biefang =

German-born Chilean ballet dancer and choreographer

- Born: 28 December 1904; Duisburg, German Empire
- Died: 19 February 1993 (aged 88); Santiago, Chile
- Occupations: Ballet dancer, choreographer, director
- Spouse: Lola Botka
- Children: 2

Ernst Uthoff Biefang (28 December 1904, Duisburg, German Empire – 19 February 1993, Santiago, Chile) was a German-born Chilean ballet dancer, choreographer, and director. Uthoff danced for Kurt Jooss's company alongside his future wife, Lola Botka, and Rudolf Pescht. In 1945, the trio co-founded the Chilean National Ballet. Uthoff won the National Prize of Art of Chile in 1984.

Uthoff and Botka had two sons, including the choreographer, dancer and director Michael Uthoff.
