= Pedro Reszka Moreau =

Chilean painter

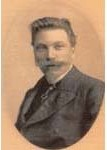
- Born: June 10, 1872; Antofagasta, Chile
- Died: March 6, 1960 (aged 87); Santiago, Chile
- Education: University of Chile
- Occupation: Painter

Pedro Reszka Moreau (June 10, 1872 - March 6, 1960) was a Chilean painter. He won the National Prize of Art of Chile in 1947.

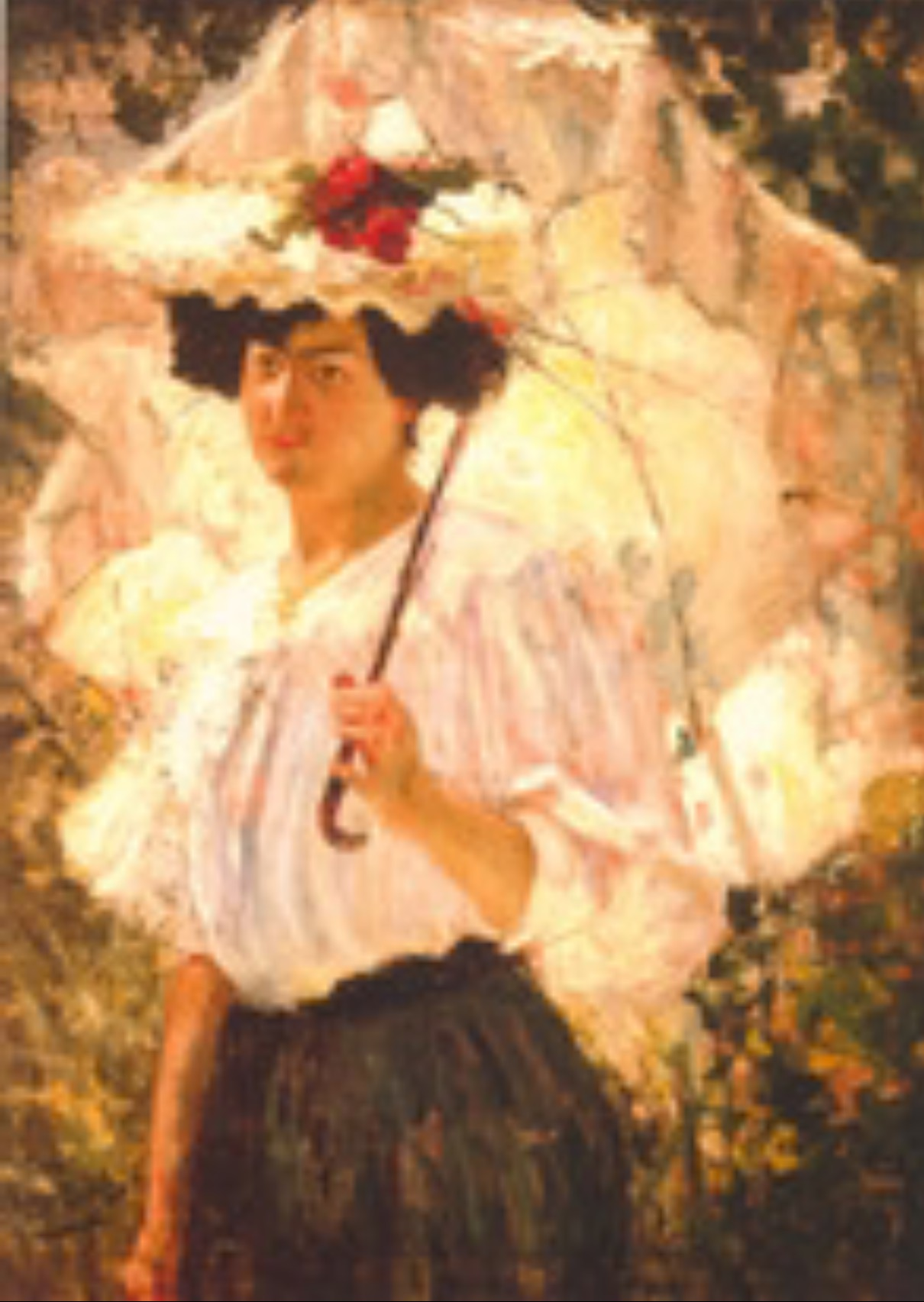
Dama del Quitasol.
