= Magdalena Petit =

Chilean writer (1903–1968)

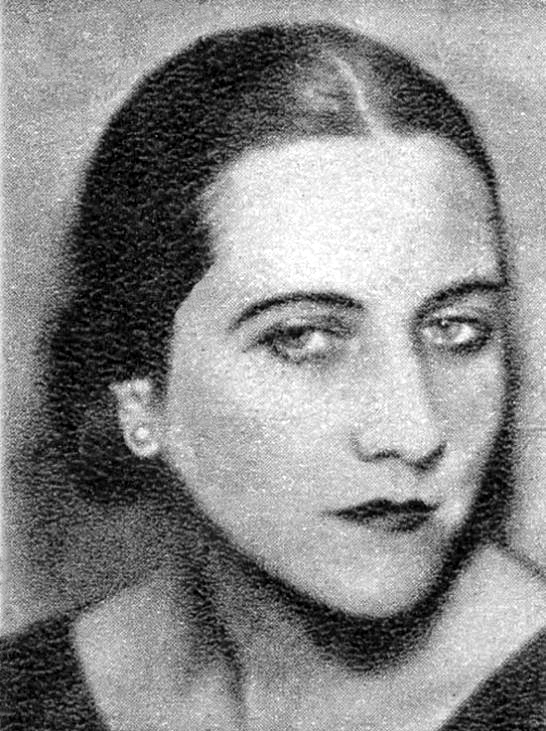
- Born: Magdalena Petit Marfán; 14 February 1903; Peñaflor, Chile
- Died: 27 September 1968 (aged 65); Santiago, Chile
- Education: Chilean National Conservatory of Music
- Occupations: Writer; journalist; playwright; editor; composer
- Relatives: Henriette Petit (sister)
- Writing career
- Language: Spanish
- Period: 1930–1968
- Notable awards: Santiago Municipal Literature Award, 1938, 1947

Magdalena Petit Marfán (14 February 1903 – 27 September 1968) was a Chilean writer, journalist, playwright, editor and composer. Notable for her popular novels La Quintrala, Los Pincheira and Los Hijos del Caleuche, Petit wrote theater pieces, essays and biographies.

== Early life and education ==
Petit was born on 14 February 1903 in Peñaflor to Emilio Petit Pinaud, a French-born physician, and María Laura Marfán Montel. Petit was the younger sister of the painter Henriette Petit.

In 1915, Petit joined the Club de Señoras which promoted education and culture for upper-class women. In 1920, Petit traveled with her sisters to Europe for the first time.

Initially studying medicine at her father's request, Petit left before receiving her degree. Petit later enrolled at the Chilean National Conservatory of Music where she studied to be a piano and music theory teacher.

== Career ==
In April 1930, Petit wrote an article for Atenea on the style and composition of the work of Marcel Proust. A staunch Proustian, Petit wrote two more articles on Proust for Atenea. One of the first Chileans to write about Proust, gained Petit recognition in Chilean literacy circles. Petit became a regular contributor to Atenea, Zig-Zag Magazine, La Nación and El Diario Ilustrado, where she wrote about national affairs, European and Chilean writers as well as theater and film criticism. Petit also contributed to the Les Cahiers du Sud and the Argentinian journal Nosotros.

In 1932, Petit published her first novel La Quintrala for which she received the La Nación award. Petit was awarded the Santiago Municipal Literature Award in 1938 for Don Diego Portales (El hombre sin concupiscencia) and in 1947 for Caleuche. In 1941, Petit was invited by the State Department to visit the United States as a writer. Petit worked as a editor for the Pan American Union Bulletin, and represented Chile at the Inter-American Commission in 1943. Petit returned to Chile in 1945.

From 1960 onwards Marfán was a permanent contributor to La Nación.

== Personal life ==
On 27 September 1968 Petit died in Santiago, aged 65, following a stroke caused by a fall.

== Bibliography ==
=== Biographies ===
- Petit, Magdalena (1937). Don Diego Portales (El hombre sin concupiscencia) (in Spanish). Santiago, Chile: Editorial Zig-Zag.
- Petit, Magdalena (1946). Biografía de Gabriela Mistral (in Spanish). Santiago, Chile: Editorial La Salle.
- Petit, Magdalena (1951). El patriota Manuel Rodríguez (in Spanish). Santiago, Chile: Editorial Zig-Zag.
- Petit, Magdalena (1965). San Martín y el ejército libertador: un hombre y su idea (in Spanish). Santiago, Chile: Editorial Zig-Zag.

=== Children's plays ===
- Petit, Magdalena (1937). El cumpleaños de Rosita: comedia infantil (in Spanish). Santiago, Chile: Editorial Zig-Zag.
- Petit, Magdalena (1937). Pulgarcito (comedia sacada del cuento del mismo nombre) (in Spanish). Santiago, Chile: Nascimento.
- Petit, Magdalena (1938). El desencantamiento de los juguetes: fantasía teatral (in Spanish). Santiago, Chile: Nascimento.

=== Essays ===
- Petit, Magdalena (1951). Un hombre en el universo: (confesión de un desorientado) Novela (in Spanish) (1 ed.). Santiago, Chile: Nascimento.
- Petit, Magdalena (1966). Un hombre en el universo: (confesión de un desorientado) Novela (in Spanish) (2 ed.). Santiago, Chile: Editorial Andrés Bello. (Note: Published with a second part at Petit's request.)
- Petit Marfán, Magdalena (1966). Ensayos y cuentos (PDF) (in Spanish). Santiago, Chile: La Nación.

=== Novels ===
- Petit, Magdalena (1932). La Quintrala. Colección de autores chilenos (in Spanish). Santiago, Chile: Editorial Zig-Zag.
- Petit, Magdalena (1946). Caleuche (in Spanish).
- Petit, Magdalena (1948). Los Pincheira (in Spanish) (1 ed.). Santiago, Chile: Editorial Zig-Zag.

=== Plays ===
- Petit, Magdalena (1941). El Hijo del Caleuche (in Spanish).
