= Benito Rebolledo Correa =

Chilean painter (1880–1964)

- Born: August 2, 1880; Curicó, Chile
- Died: June 29, 1964 (aged 83); Santiago, Chile
- Education: University of Chile
- Occupation: Painter

Benito Rebolledo Correa (August 2, 1880 – June 29, 1964) was a Chilean painter. He won the National Prize of Art of Chile in 1959.
