= Lola Botka =

Hungarian-Chilean ballerina, teacher and director (1910–2006)

Lola Botka (21 February 1910, Budapest, Austria-Hungary – 28 November 2006, Santiago, Chile) was a Hungarian-born Chilean ballerina, teacher and director, known for co-founding the Chilean National Ballet alongside Rudolf Pescht and her husband Ernst Uthoff Biefang. Botka and Uthoff had two sons, including the choreographer, dancer and director Michael Uthoff.
