= Norberto Ladrón de Guevara =

Chilean politician and footballer (1892-1969)

Member of the Chamber of Deputies
- In office 21 May 1949 – 15 May 1953
- Constituency: 6th Departmental Group

Personal details
- Born: 31 January 1892 Valparaíso, Chile
- Died: 23 October 1969 (aged 77) Valparaíso, Chile
- Party: Liberal Party
- Spouse: Aída Raquel Balbontín Sánchez (m. 1932)
- Profession: Lawyer
Association football career
- Position: Midfielder
Senior career*
Years	Team	Apps	(Gls)
- Gold Cross
International career
1917	Chile	2	(0)
- * Club domestic league appearances and goals

Norberto Ladrón de Guevara Almeyda (Note: In this Chilean name, the first or paternal surname is Ladrón de Guevara and the second or maternal family name is Almeyda.) (31 January 1892 – 23 October 1969) was a Chilean lawyer and parliamentarian who served as a member of the Chamber of Deputies.

Ladrón de Guevara was elected deputy for the Valparaíso Province in the 1949 Chilean parliamentary election as a member of the Liberal Party.

He played in two matches for the Chile national football team in 1917. He was also part of Chile's squad for the 1917 South American Championship.

== Biography ==
Ladrón de Guevara Almeyda was born in Valparaíso on 31 January 1892, the son of José María Ladrón de Guevara and Ana Almeyda. He completed his secondary education at the Liceo of Valparaíso and pursued legal studies through the local law course, qualifying as a lawyer on 15 December 1915. His undergraduate thesis was titled Obligaciones.

He practiced law in Valparaíso, sharing a law office with Mario Casarino Viterbo, a noted jurist and professor of procedural law. He was a founder of the Free Legal Aid Clinic for Workers in Valparaíso and served as legal counsel to several shipping and commercial companies, including Compañía Inglesa de Vapores and Italmar. He also held directorships in insurance companies such as La Colonial and La Unión Italo-Chilena Consolidada, the Santa Catalina Agricultural Society, and the Chilean Maritime League, and served as president of the firm Jorge Gallardo S.A.C.

From a young age he collaborated with the Valparaíso newspaper La Unión and was a founder and professor of the Diego Barros Arana Night School. He married Aída Raquel Balbontín Sánchez in Valparaíso on 29 October 1932; the couple had two daughters.

== Political career ==
A member of the Liberal Party, Ladrón de Guevara Almeyda served as president of the Liberal Assembly of Valparaíso and held several terms as municipal councillor (regidor) of the Municipality of Valparaíso.

In the parliamentary elections of 1949, he was elected Deputy for the 6th Departmental Group — Valparaíso and Quillota — serving during the 1949–1953 legislative period. During his tenure, he served as a replacement member of the Standing Committees on Government Interior and on Labour and Social Legislation, and as a full member of the Committee on Constitution, Legislation and Justice.
