= Serge Brignoni =

Swiss avant-garde painter and sculptor

- Born: 12 October 1903; Chiasso, Switzerland
- Died: 6 January 2002 (aged 98); Bern, Switzerland
- Known for: painting, printmaking, sculpture
- Movement: Surrealism

Serge Brignoni (12 October 1903 – 6 January 2002) was a Swiss avant-garde painter and sculptor. His collection of ethnic art is now housed in the Museo delle Culture in Lugano.

== Early life and education ==
Brignoni was born in October 1903 in the village San Simone near Chiasso to Romeo Brignoni and Cesira Muschetti. In 1907 he and his parents moved to Bern. At the age of fifteen, his interest into art developed after his father gave him some art magazines. Following Brignoni attempted to copy some of the works he saw. From 1919 onwards, he attended the School of Arts and Crafts in Bern, where he mainly studied art with Victor Surbek. In 1921, the family settled to Bellinzona where his father became the deputy director of the Swiss Post. Since he made trips to the nearby Milano in Italy, to study the buildings and museums of the city. He chose not to attend the art academy of Milano as he deemed it too conservative. He then continued his studies at the Academy of Arts, Berlin. In Berlin he visited the museums and got to know the German expressionism and Russian constructivism. In 1923 he went to study in Paris at the Académie de la Grande Chaumière, where he met Alberto Giacometti, Picasso, and other avant-gardists, and where he was first exposed to African art.

== Professional career ==
He worked at the Atelier 17 studio. He began collecting these artworks in 1926 and expanded the scope of his collecting to Melanesian and Indonesian art; he also supported himself in part through sales of these works. During this period he was also active in his own works, which were Surrealist and Primitivist in character. He joined Gruppe 33, an anti-Fascist association of artists based in Basel, and was represented in the 1935 and 1936 Surrealist exhibits in Copenhagen. He married Chilean painter Graciela Aranis (1906-1996) in 1935.

In 1940 he was forced to return to Switzerland due to World War II, leaving his own work and his collection behind. Much of the former was lost to theft or destroyed, but the collection was held up by French customs, and was preserved intact, and at the end of the war he was able to retrieve it. He resumed his collecting after the war, eventually donating the collection to the city of Lugano in several phases beginning in 1985. He continued to work in a variety of media including sculpture, lithography, collage and painting; he also taught at the Kunstgewerbeschule in Zürich. He painted several murals, including one at the Government Headquarters in Bellinzona (1958) and another in the television headquarters in Comano (1975).

His works were widely exhibited, including a 1997 retrospective show at the Kunstmuseum Bern. He died in that city in 2002, survived by his second wife Marlyse Haller.
