= Museum of Cultures (Lugano) =

Museum in Lugano, Switzerland

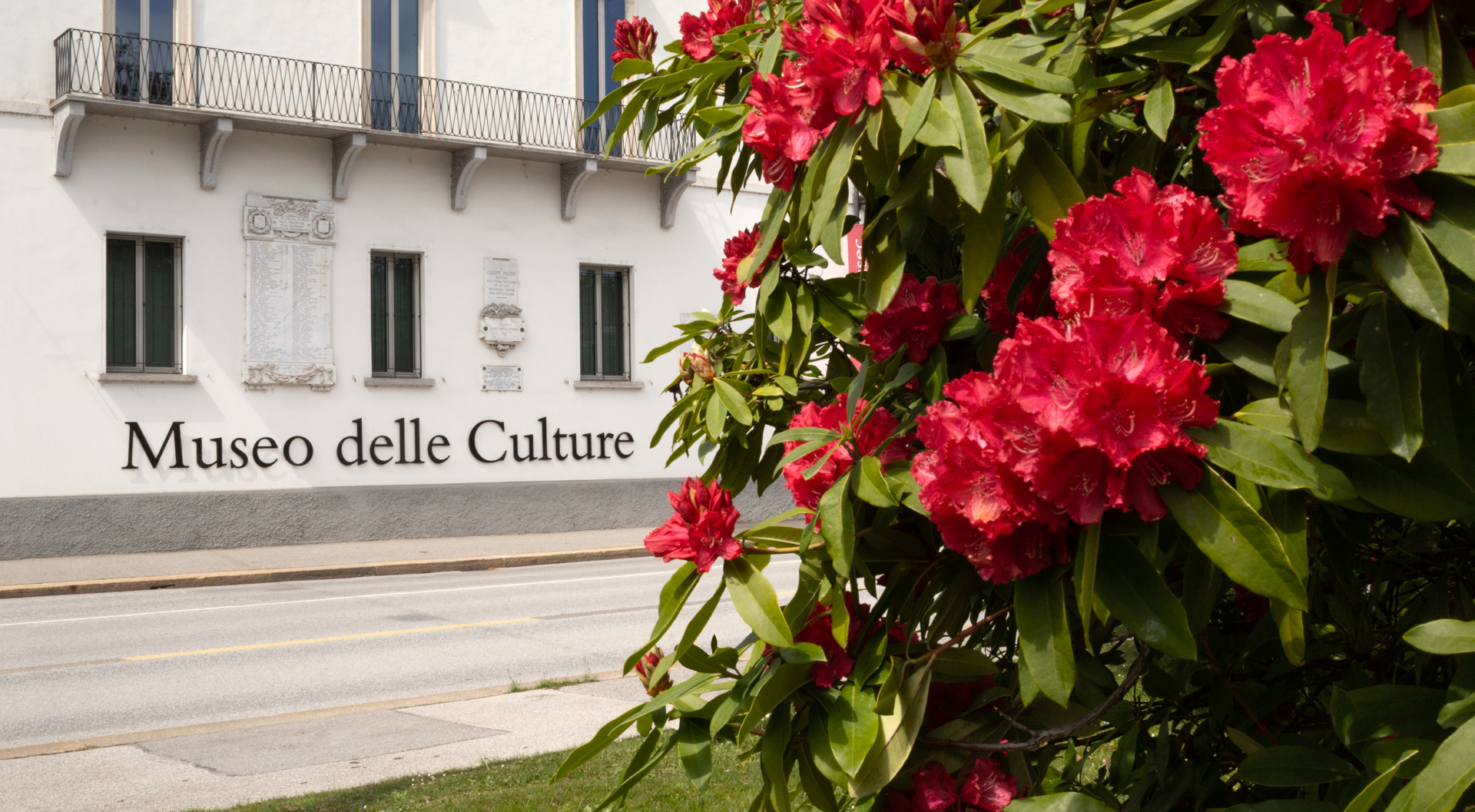
The museum's view from Riva Caccia Street, Lugano

The Museo delle Culture di Lugano (MUSEC) was opened on 23 September 1989 with the aim of preserving the ethnic art collected by Serge Brignoni from the Far East, India, South-East Asia, Indonesia and Oceania. Since then, the museum has received additional collections of ethnic and oriental art, photography, contemporary and applied art. The museum was founded as the Museum of Extra-European Cultures. In 2007 it was renamed "Museo delle Culture" and since 2017 it has been called "MUSEC: Museo delle Culture". It is housed in the central Villa Malpensata, with access possible both from Via Mazzini and from Riva Caccia.

Since January 1, 2019, the Museo delle Culture (MUSEC) has been operated by the Fondazione Culture e Musei (FCM), which oversees its administration while preserving its autonomy and institutional identity. Based in the renovated Villa Malpensata, the foundation aims to streamline management, create operational synergies, and strengthen engagement with the local region and the public. This arrangement supports MUSEC in continuing and expanding its diverse cultural and research activities.

== Villa Malpensata ==
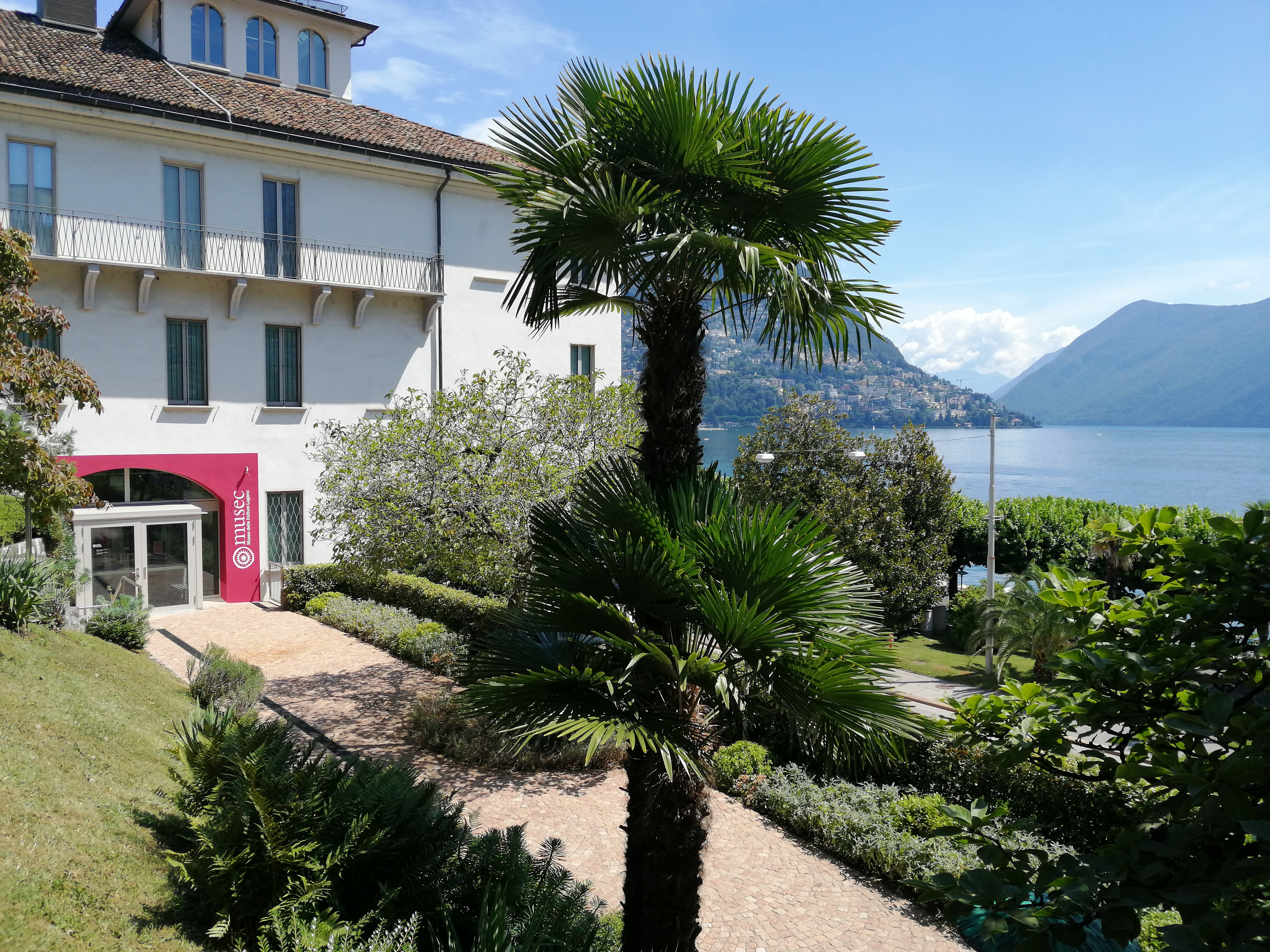
Villa Malpensata, MUSEC's venue

In 2017, MUSEC moved to Villa Malpensata. The Villa was built by the Caccia family in the mid-eighteenth century according to the style that at that time characterized the monumental and scenic rearrangement of the banks of the great alpine lakes. Used from 1893 onwards as a museum, from 1973 it became the permanent seat of the art museum and temporary exhibitions of various kinds.

The restoration designed in 2014 to give MUSEC a larger and more central location involved, in addition to the main building, both the two buildings flanking it to the north - intended for offices and the Research and Documentation Centre - and the terraced garden to the south, reorganized to house the MUSEC's outdoor spaces and the raised terrace that leads to the new main entrance. All the spaces are rearranged according to international climatic and museum-technical standards and equipped with the best safety conditions.

== History ==
Since its opening to the public on September 23, 1989, and until 2016, the Heleneum was the seat of MUSEC. The Heleneum is a villa on the shores of Lake Lugano built between 1930 and 1934 on the architectural model of the "Petit Trianon" in Versailles by Hélène Bieber, a strong-willed cosmopolitan lady who wanted to transform it into a centre for social and cultural entertainment and who lived there until 1967. Especially because of the economic crisis of the 1930s, Hélène Bieber failed in her intentions and the Heleneum remained a sparsely inhabited dwelling until, in 1969, it was bought by the Municipality of Castagnola, now a district of the City of Lugano.

From 1969 to 1971 the Heleneum was the venue for the piano courses held by Carlo Florindo Semini, Franco Ferrara and Arturo Benedetti Michelangeli. From 1971 to 1973, the villa hosted the summer courses and seminars of the Ticino Institute of High Studies, directed by Elémire Zolla, which brought together important scholars of different disciplines on the themes of religious knowledge.

Later, until 1976, the Heleneum was the seat of the Centre for Semantic and Cognitive Studies of the Dalle Molle Institute, which operated in the field of artificial intelligence, at that time in its early days, and which organized various seminars attended by scholars and researchers from all over the world. The villa was finally the kindergarten of Castagnola and was used as a set for film productions in which Bruno Ganz and Aldo Fabrizi, among others, took part.

The Museo delle Culture conserves most of the ethnic art that Serge Brignoni collected between 1930 and 1985. The collection shows the link between the creative forms of the "South Seas" culture and the artistic Avant-Garde of the 19th century that were inspired by those objects. The collection reflects Brignoni's selection of well-crafted objects that show an appreciation of art forms from a very different culture. The genres and the geographical origins of the Brignoni collection works are similar to those found in leading European, North American and Australian collections from the first half of the 20th century. Moreover, the collection includes all of the areas that are considered fundamental for a contemporary collection of the time.

== Collection ==
The Brignoni collection

MUSEC opened its doors in 1989 thanks to the bequest of ethnic works of art that the Swiss artist and collector Serge Brignoni (1903-2002) collected in the long period between 1930 and the mid-1980s, when he decided to donate them to the city of Lugano. The collection thus bears witness, first of all, to the link between the forms of creativity of the "South Seas" cultures and the object that the artistic avant-gardes of the 20th century discussed in their circles and tried to create in their works. The works are the expression of a refined choice that privileges the best manufactured articles and knows how to recognize phenomenologically the expressions of an art not yet acculturated. The genres and geographical origins, albeit with some significant exceptions, reflect those most widespread in the European, Australian and North American collections of the mid-twentieth century and there is almost no lack of "pieces" of what were considered the indispensable objects of collecting at the time. Particularly evident is the taste for sculptural works, marked by expressionistic content and creative methods and by a particular richness of drawing and pictorial decoration.

Other collections

Following the opening of the museum and especially since its relaunch in 2005, the MUSEC hosts and enhances many other Collections, some of which are listed below: the Ceschin Pilone-Fagioli Collection (hand-painted Japanese albumen photographs, dating back to the late nineteenth and early twentieth century); the Pilone Collection (includes over 400 works or groups of works of Chinese theatre, including painted masks and faces, headgear, make-up and costume accessories, fans, musical instruments and entire sets); the Nodari collection and fund (a thousand works of art and objects of material culture, two large river boats, about 6. 000 photographs, 71 documentary films and over sixty hours of sound recordings on cassette or tape, collected in the field, during a series of trips to Africa - especially in the Upper Congo - in the 1950s and 1960s) and the Antonini Collection (over 1100 ornamental combs from all over the world).

== Exhibitions ==
MUSEC preserves and enhances art collections from the Far East, India, Southeast Asia and Oceania. The new headquarters, the eighteenth-century Villa Malpensata, located on the lakeside promenade of Lugano, provides a setting following the most modern canons of museology. The museum, an important research centre on the anthropology of art, simultaneously offers the public at least three exhibitions able to communicate, each according to its own thematic peculiarities, the overall articulation of its cultural project.

- The "Spazio Tesoro", located at the entrance of the museum and with free access, accompanies the visitor on a periodically renewed route, with works from the Brignoni Collection and the other main collections of the museum. An itinerary full of meanings allows the visitor, among other things, to interact dynamically with the themes and works presented in the other exhibition spaces of the museum, sometimes anticipating them, sometimes providing valuable keys of interpretation, useful to grasp the unity of the museographic project.

- The "Spazio Maraini" presents the exhibitions of the "Esovisioni" cycle dedicated to travel photography and the theme of exoticism in the work of great photographers.

-The "Spazio Cielo" is entirely dedicated to hosting the exhibitions of the "Cameredarte" project, dedicated to new acquisitions, to collectors who collaborate with MUSEC and to contemporary artists who have approached the museum's activities over the years.

- Inside the "Spazio Mostre" which occupies two floors of the museum presents major exhibition.

== See also ==
- List of museums in Switzerland

== Bibliography ==
- Campione, Francesco Paolo (ed.), The Brignoni Collection; volume one, Art through Methamorphosis; volume two, Catalogue of Works, Mazzotta, Milan 2007. ISBN 978-88-202-1848-5 and ISBN 978-88-202-1865-2.
- Cometti, Marta, Guida. Museo delle Culture di Lugano, Edizioni Città di Lugano/MCL (Antropunti/3), Lugano, 2009. ISBN 978-88-7777-043-1.
- Vago, Valeria, In viaggio per i mari del Sud. Guida per ragazzi al Museo delle Culture, Edizioni Città di Lugano/MCL (Antropunti/2), Lugano, 2009. ISBN 978-88-7777-042-4.
