= Luz de Viana =

Chilean writer and painter (1900–1995)

- Born: Marta Villanueva Cárdenas; 25 December 1900; Santiago
- Died: 1995 (aged 95); Santiago
- Spouse: Alfonso Bulnes Calvo
- Writing career
- Pen name: Luz de Viana (writer); Marta Villanueva (painter)
- Years active: 1945–95
- Genres: Novels and short stories
- Notable awards: Athena Award (1945)

Marta Villanueva Cárdenas, known by her pseudonyms Luz de Viana and Marta Villanueva, (b. 25 December 1900 – d. 1995) was a Chilean writer and painter. She specialized in novels and short stories.

== Biography ==
Marta Villanueva Cárdenas was born in Santiago, Chile. Her first published work was No sirve la Luna blanca (1945), for which she won the Athena Award from the University of Concepción. She is assigned to the "School of Subjectivity" of feminine literature in Chile and of contemporary Chilean writers. As a painter, under the pseudonym Marta Villanueva, she is included in the Grupo Montparnasse. Her husband was Alfonso Bulnes Calvo (1885–1970), Chilean historian, essayist and diplomat. She died in Santiago.

Along with María Carolina Geel, Cárdenas is considered to be an important and liberal writer in the field of feminist writing. Cárdenas studied art at the Académie de la Grande Chaumière and studio of André Lothe in Paris.

In 1945, Cárdenas received the Athena Award.
