= Camilo Mori =

Chilean painter

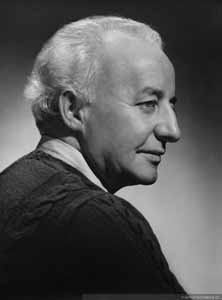
- Born: 24 September 1896; Valparaíso, Chile
- Died: 7 December 1973 (aged 77); Santiago, Chile
- Known for: Painting
- Movement: Expressionism

Camilo Mori Serrano (September 24, 1896 – December 7, 1973) was a Chilean painter and a founder of the Grupo Montparnasse.

The son of an Italian immigrant, Camilo Mori entered the "Escuela de Bellas Artes" (School of Fine Arts) at the University of Chile in 1914 and studied under masters Juan Francisco González, Richón Brunet and Alberto Valenzuela Llanos. In 1920, he was sent by the Chilean government to further his studies in Europe]

Over the next three years, Mori spent time in Rome and Paris. He joined the gathering of artists in the Montparnasse Quarter in Paris. There, his encounter with Pablo Picasso and Juan Gris greatly influenced his ideas of painting. However it was the influence of the works of Paul Cézanne that challenged Mori to move away from the Realism that marked his earlier work. He started experimenting with a variety of styles which later formed the basis of modern art. He exhibited in the Salon d'Automne of 1920 in Paris, where his "Circo de la Feria" received an honorable mention.

He returned to Chile and became one of the founding members of the Grupo Montparnasse, a key influence in the diffusion of the new European painting trends in Chile. In 1928 Camilo Mori was named director of the National Museum of Fine Arts (Spanish: Museo Nacional de Bellas Artes or MNBA). During his tenure in this post, he was responsible for many initiatives aimed at promoting art in Chile. In 1928, as an initiative to mitigate the closure of the School of Fine Arts, Mori was once again sent by the Chilean government to Europe, this time to direct the studies of a group of young painters known as the "Generation of 1928" (Spanish: Generacion del 28), which culminated in 26 of the most outstanding young Chilean artists being sent to study in Paris for five years.

Mori returned to Chile in 1933, where he accepted a position as professor of drawing and color at the Universidad de Chile, a post he retained for over 30 years. In 1937 he moved to the United States where he spent two years exploring some of the newest artistic trends of the time. He was placed in charge of supervising the decoration of, and created a mural for, the pavilion of Chile at the 1939 New York World's Fair.

For his contribution to Chilean art, in 1950 he received the National Prize of Art. His work was complex and multifaceted and moved through Post-Impressionism, Expressionism, Cubism and Surrealism, with the common trend among them being a prominent treatment of color.
