= Pedro Olmos Muñoz =

Chilean painter and illustrator

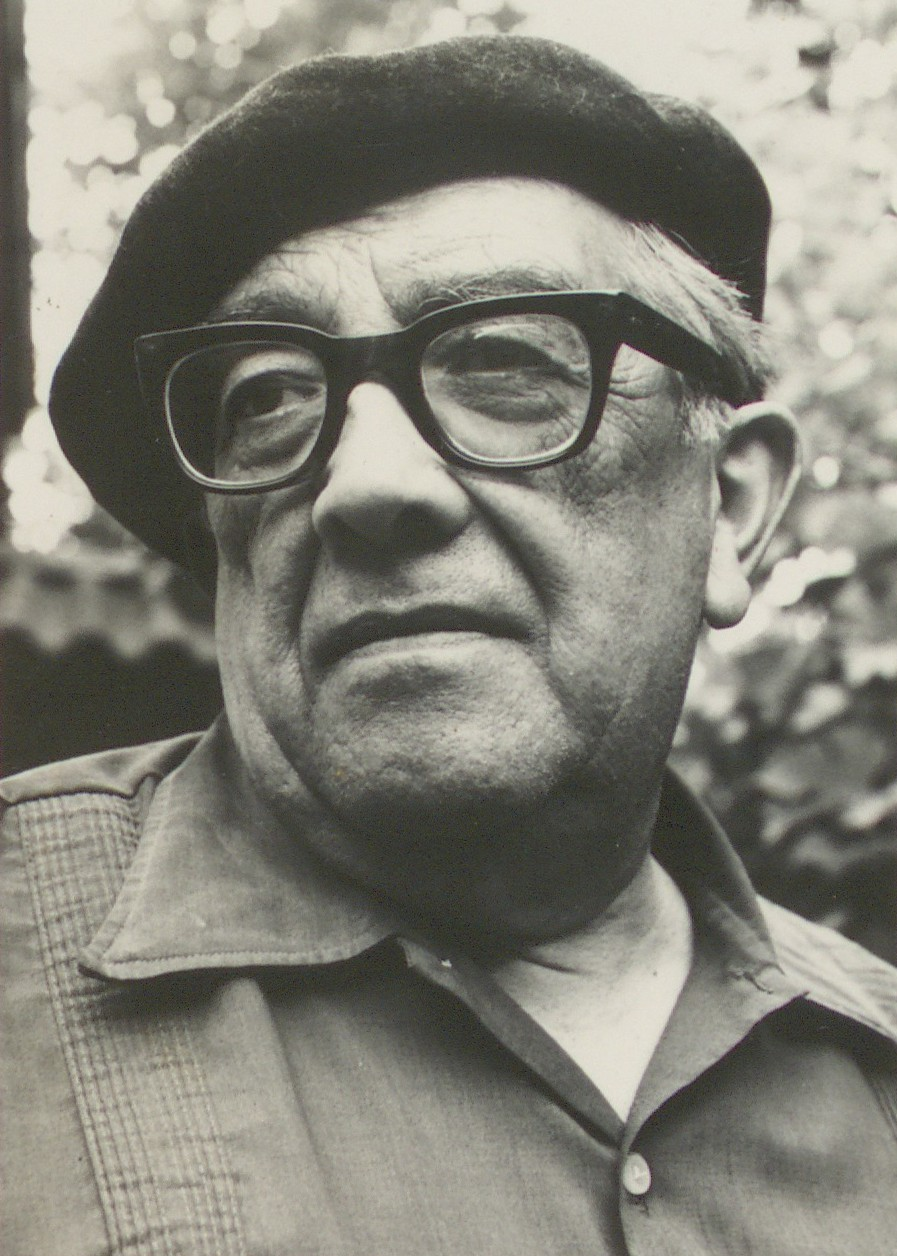
- Born: 11 June 1911; Valparaíso, Chile
- Died: 9 May 1991 (aged 79); Linares, Chile
- Education: University of Chile
- Occupations: Painter; illustrator
- Spouse: Emma Jauch

Pedro Olmos Muñoz (11 June 1911 – 9 May 1991) was a Chilean painter and illustrator.

== Biography ==
His childhood and adolescence were spent in San Felipe. Later, he studied arts at the Pedagogical Institute of the University of Chile. In his college years he was part of the intellectual groups of the '30s, alongside the likes of Pablo Neruda and Juvencio Valley.

In 1938, he moved to Argentina where he specialized in murals and directed the exhibition hall of the Teatro del Pueblo de Buenos Aires. In 1946, he participated in the exhibition "Ars Americana" in Paris and the Exhibition of UNESCO.

In the late 50's he moved with his wife Emma Jauch, herself a noted Chilean writer and painter, to the city of Linares, where he taught at the high school of that city. He was also one of the drivers of Ancoa Group and one of the drivers of the installation of the Linares Museum of Art and Craft. He was also the restorer of the historic Museum of Yerbas Buenas, the "House of Romance".

== Work ==
Olmos' work was figurative, and often portrayed everyday situations of rural and urban life in the central area of the country. Included in his still lifes, portraits, signs of popular religion, folk scenes, among others.

Olmos used several painting techniques, such as oil, prints, drawings and murals. In this technique include, among others, made in the municipality of Linares with important figures in the area, or the Hospital the mine El Teniente.
