= Laureano Ladrón de Guevara =

Chilean painter, printmaker and muralist (1889–1968)

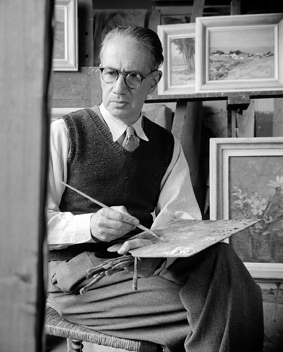
Laureano Ladrón de Guevara Romero

Laureano Manuel Ladrón de Guevara Romero (Note: In this Chilean name, the first or paternal surname is Ladrón de Guevara and the second or maternal family name is Romero.) (1889–1968), better known as Laureano Guevara, was a Chilean painter, printmaker and muralist. He was born in Molina on June 18, 1889, and died in Santiago on November 21, 1968.

== Education ==
He began his artistic studies at Valparaíso, where he was a disciple of Juan Francisco González with whom he learned drawing. Later, he studied law and architecture, which he abandoned to join the School of Fine Arts, University of Chile, where he studied with José Mercedes Ortega, Fernando Álvarez de Sotomayor, Alberto Valenzuela Llanos, Ricardo Richon-Brunet, and Pedro Lira. He was one of the members of the Generación del 13.

== Work ==
After gaining recognition for his work and with the money he earned from his first exhibition, he traveled to Europe in 1924 to devote himself to studying the techniques of fresco painting and engraving. Inspired by Paul Cézanne, he joined the movement for the renewal of French painting and was a great admirer of cubist artists.

In Denmark he studied the stained glass technique. On returning to the country in 1927, he was professor of engraving at the School of Fine Arts. He traveled to Europe for the second time with a group of 1928 fellows, as part of the so-called Generation 28.

In Spain he became interested in mural painting for which he became known as a prominent curator and teacher. Upon his return to Chile in 1932 he created the mural painting course at the School of Fine Arts. He taught at this school for over thirty years. Juana Lecaros was one of his students.

In his works he recreated the coastal and rural landscape, still life, portraits and traditional scenes, through pen, ink, chalk, charcoal, oil, watercolor, fresco painting, murals and stained glass. He was noted for the strength of his drawing and recreation of intimate and melancholic atmospheres through a color that characterized Generation Thirteen and which was dominated by pastel and earthy tones.

== Recognition ==
Among the numerous awards he received during his life, the prize obtained at the Latin American Exhibition in Seville in 1929, shared with Arthur Gordon is the most noteworthy. The winning works are located, from 2001, at the University of Talca. He received the National Art Award given by the Chilean government in 1967.

=== Distinctions ===
- 1919: 3rd Place Salón Oficial, Santiago, Chile
- 1920: 3rd Place Decorative Art Section, Salón Oficial, Santiago, Chile.
- 1923: 2nd Place Decorative Art Section, Salón Oficial, Santiago, Chile.
- 1927: Honourable Mention, Applied Art, Salón Oficial, Santiago, Chile.
- 1929: Gold Medal, International Exposition, Sevilla, Spain.
- 1931: Honorable Mention, Salón Oficial, Santiago, Chile.
- 1937: Ex-aequo Illustrious Award, Santiago Municipality, Santiago, Chile; Certamen Edwards Award, Salón Oficial, Santiago, Chile.
- 1941: 1st Mural Painting, IV Centenary Committee, Chile; 2nd Prize, Applied Art Category, Chile.
- 1949: Honour Award, XVI Salón de Verano, Viña del Mar, Chile.
- 1956: Critics Award, Santiago, Chile.
- 1957: Honour Award, Salón Oficial, Santiago, Chile.
- 1967: National Art Award, Santiago, Chile.

=== Individual exhibitions ===
- 1923: Rivas and Calvo Hall, Santiago, Chile.
- 1948: Bank of Chile Hall, Santiago, Chile.
- 1980: Bocetos de Laureano Guevara (Sketches of Laureano Guevara), North American-Chilean Institute, Santiago, Chile.
- 1989: Perspectiva en el Tiempo, (Perspective in Time) Posada del Corregidor Gallery, Santiago, Chile.
- 1995: Laureano Guevara, Hall of Fine Arts Museum of Archaeology, La Serena, Chile.
- 1996: Retrospectiva (Retrospective), Viña del Mar Room, Viña del Mar, Chile.
- 1996: Pedro Olmos Munoz Cultural Extension Center, Talca, Chile.
- 1998: Cultural Centre of Isla Negra, Chile.
- 2008: Retrospectiva, (Retrospective) National Museum of Fine Arts, Santiago, Chile.

=== Works ===
- El Bote Blanco (The White Boat), Oil on Canvas, 33 x 46 cm.
- Retrato de Henriette Petit (Portrait of Henriette Petit), Oil on Canvas, 173 x 137 cm.
- Figuras (Figures), graphite drawing.
- Naturaleza Muerta (Still Life) Oil on cardboard, 50 x 61 cm.
- Paisaje de la Costa (Coastal Landscape), Oil on pastel, 44 x 53 cm.
- Mural, Museo Nacional de Caracas (National Museum of Caracas Mural), Venezuela.
- Tejido de Arauco (Arauco fabric), Oil on Canvas, 198 x 550 cm.
- La Agricultura (Agriculture), Oil on Canvas, 200 x 800 cm.
- La Minería, (Mining), Oil on Canvas, 199 x 800 cm.
- La Pesca (Fishing), Oil on Canvas, 204.5 x 543 cm.
- Paisaje desde el Cerro El Roble (View from the Cerro El Roble), Oil on Canvas, 65 x 64 cm.
- Trabajo y Familia del Obrero (Worker's Work and Family), 1932, vitral, 525 x 240 cm.
- Fresia lanzando a su hijo a los pies de Caupolicán (Fresia throwing his son to's feet from Caupolicán), 1946, restored in 1993.
- Mural en la Ciudad del Niño de Santiago (Mural in the City of the Child of Santiago).
