= Carmen Aldunate =

Chilean painter (1940–2026)

- Aldunate in 2013
- Born: Carmen Zita Aldunate Salas; 10 February 1940; Viña del Mar, Chile
- Died: 25 September 2026 (aged 86)
- Education: Pontifical Catholic University of Chile; University of Chile

Carmen Zita Aldunate Salas (Note: In this Chilean name, the first or paternal surname is Aldunate and the second or maternal family name is Salas.) (10 February 1940 – 25 September 2026) was a Chilean painter and illustrator. After studying art at the Pontifical Catholic University of Chile, the University of Chile, and the University of California, Davis, Aldunate began teaching painting and drawing. Associated with the Nueva Figuración movement, Aldunate's work centred on women, whom she often painted dressed in medieval clothing.

Aldunate worked as a painter for over 60 years, retiring in 2024 after losing much of her eyesight. She became a member of the Academia Chilena de Bellas Artes in 2004 and was nominated, in 2021, for the Chilean National Prize for Plastic Arts.

== Early life and education ==
Aldunate was born in Viña del Mar, Chile, on 10 February 1940, the youngest of four children born to Eliana Salas Edwards and Jorge Aldunate Eguiguren. She was a descendent of José Miguel Carrera; María Edwards was also a relation. Aldunate grew up on Compañía Street in Santiago.

She became interested in art at a young age; many of the women in her family, including her mother and grandmother, were painters. She left school shortly before graduating, when a teacher accused her of stealing a quince. At the age of 17, she enrolled in the arts department of the Pontifical Catholic University of Chile, but was expelled after bringing a nude model to class. She apologised and was allowed to return, but soon left again. She also studied at the University of Chile and, for six or seven years during the 1960s, lived in the United States to study art at the University of California, Davis. In the United States, she met artists including Willem de Kooning and William T. Wiley; she also claimed to have hung out with hippies, "with her breasts out", during the Vietnam War.

Artists under whom Aldunate studied included José Balmes, Nemesio Antúnez, Roser Bru, Mario Carreño, Delia del Carril, and Alberto Piwonka.

== Career ==
After leaving the University of California, Aldunate was hired to teach painting and drawing at the Pontifical Catholic University of Chile. In 2004, she became a full member of the Academia Chilena de Bellas Artes.

She provided illustrations and drew the front cover of the 2020 book Deja que todo el mundo te cuente lo que pasó, an anthology about the then-ongoing COVID-19 pandemic, and Haydée Correa's 2005 Las Conquistadoras, a biographical dictionary dedicated to Chilean women. In 2021, she was nominated for the Chilean National Prize for Plastic Arts; that year's award was won by Francisco Gazitúa. Aldunate announced her retirement from the art world in 2024, after her exhibit Ocaso (transl. Sunset) at the Ralli Museum in Vitacura, Santiago. Having been a painter for over sixty years, Aldunate stopped painting in 2023 after losing much of her eyesight.

Aldunate described her work, which was often focused on women, especially dressed in medieval clothing, as inspired by both the Renaissance and Surrealist movements; her work was reminiscent of the pre-Renaissance period. In later years, her breast cancer and medical issues became a recurring theme in her paintings. She was associated with the Nueva Figuración movement and primarily worked with oil paints on canvas.

Her art was in the permanent collection of the Ralli Museum in Punta del Este, Uruguay, the Chilean National Museum of Fine Arts, the Museo de Artes Visuales, and the gallery of the Universidad de Concepción. 132 of her paintings are owned by the Ralli Museums.

She was the subject of the biography Carmen Aldunate: sin corazas, written by historian Patricia Arancibia Clavel.

=== Exhibitions ===
During her life, Aldunate held over 100 exhibits in both Chile and abroad, including over 26 solo exhibitions. These include:

- 1963: Galería Central, Chile
- 1964: Belmonte Art Gallery, Sacramento, California, U.S.
- 1967: Galería Carmen Waugh, Chile
- 1968: Instituto Cultural de Providencia, Santiago, Chile
- 1968: Galería de Arte Contemporáneo, Viña del Mar, Chile
- 1969: Art Department, University of California, Davis, U.S.
- 1973: Galería C.A.L., Chile
- 1973: Pernambuco, Brazil
- 1975: Galería Imagen, Chile
- 1976: Galería Rubbers, Buenos Aires, Argentina
- 1976: Galería Imagen, Chile
- 1977: Galería 9, Lima, Peru.
- 1978: Galería Epoca, Chile.
- 1979: Museo Arte, Maldonado, Uruguay.
- 1980: Galería 9, Lima, Peru.
- Pintura chilena contemporánea exhibit (in a series of group exhibits from 1980 to 1981, organized by the Departamento de Extensión Cultural)
- 2006: Cuentos en Verano (group exhibit), Teatro de Zapallar, Chile
- 2006: Arte Ayuda 2006 (group exhibit), Casas de Lo Matta, )
- 2015: 50 años de la Academia Chilena de Bellas Artes (group exhibit)
- 2017: Sin Título (transl. Untitled), Las Condes Design space)
- 2024: Ocaso (transl. Sunset), Ralli Museum in Vitacura

=== Awards and nominations ===
- 1962: First place at the Santiago Plastic Art Show
- 1963: First place at the University of Chile art show
- 1967: Painting prize at the Santiago Museum of Contemporary Art
- 1978: Bienal de Punta del Este (first place)
- 1981: IV American Biennial of Graphic Arts (honorable mention)'
- 2021: National Prize for Plastic Arts (nominated)

== Personal life and death ==
Aldunate was married for forty years, beginning c. 1961 to Juan José Romero, whom she met when the pair were children; the marriage ended in divorce, though she and Romero remained friends. The couple had two daughters, one of whom, María José Romero, was also an artist.

In 2015, Aldunate gave an interview with The Clinic where she described the Mapuche people as "lazy and drunk" and dismissed student protests; these comments were met negatively on social media.

Aldunate began experiencing macular degeneration in the 1980s, which resulted in her losing sight in one eye; she had a live-in caretaker for over thirty years. In the final years of her life, her eyesight had severely deteriorated in both eyes and she was diagnosed with breast cancer. She died on 25 September 2026, at the age of 86.
