= Roser Bru =

Chilean painter and engraver (1923–2021)

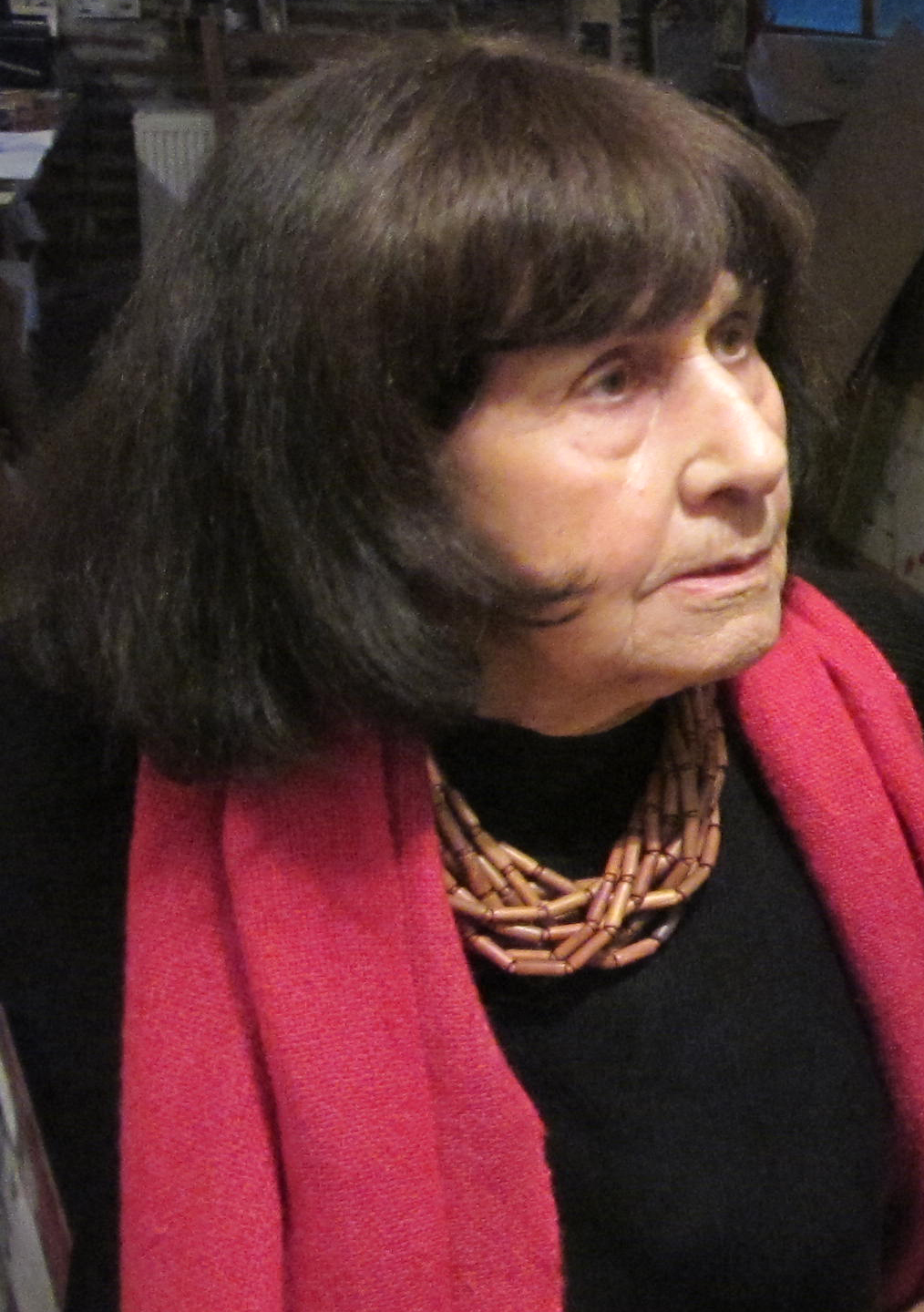
- Roser Bru in 2013
- Born: Roser Bru Llop; 15 February 1923; Barcelona, Spain
- Died: 26 May 2021 (aged 98); Santiago, Chile
- Education: University of Chile
- Occupations: Painter, engraver
- Employer: Pontifical Catholic University of Chile
- Notable work: Vivir en obra, Plan B
- Awards: Commander of the Order of Isabella the Catholic (1995); Altazor Award (2000, 2013); Pablo Neruda Order of Artistic and Cultural Merit; National Prize for Plastic Arts (2015)
- Website: www.roserbru.cl

Roser Bru Llop (15 February 1923 – 26 May 2021) was a Spanish-born Chilean painter and engraver associated with the neo-figurative art movement.

== Biography ==
Roser Bru Llop
Voice introduction (2015)

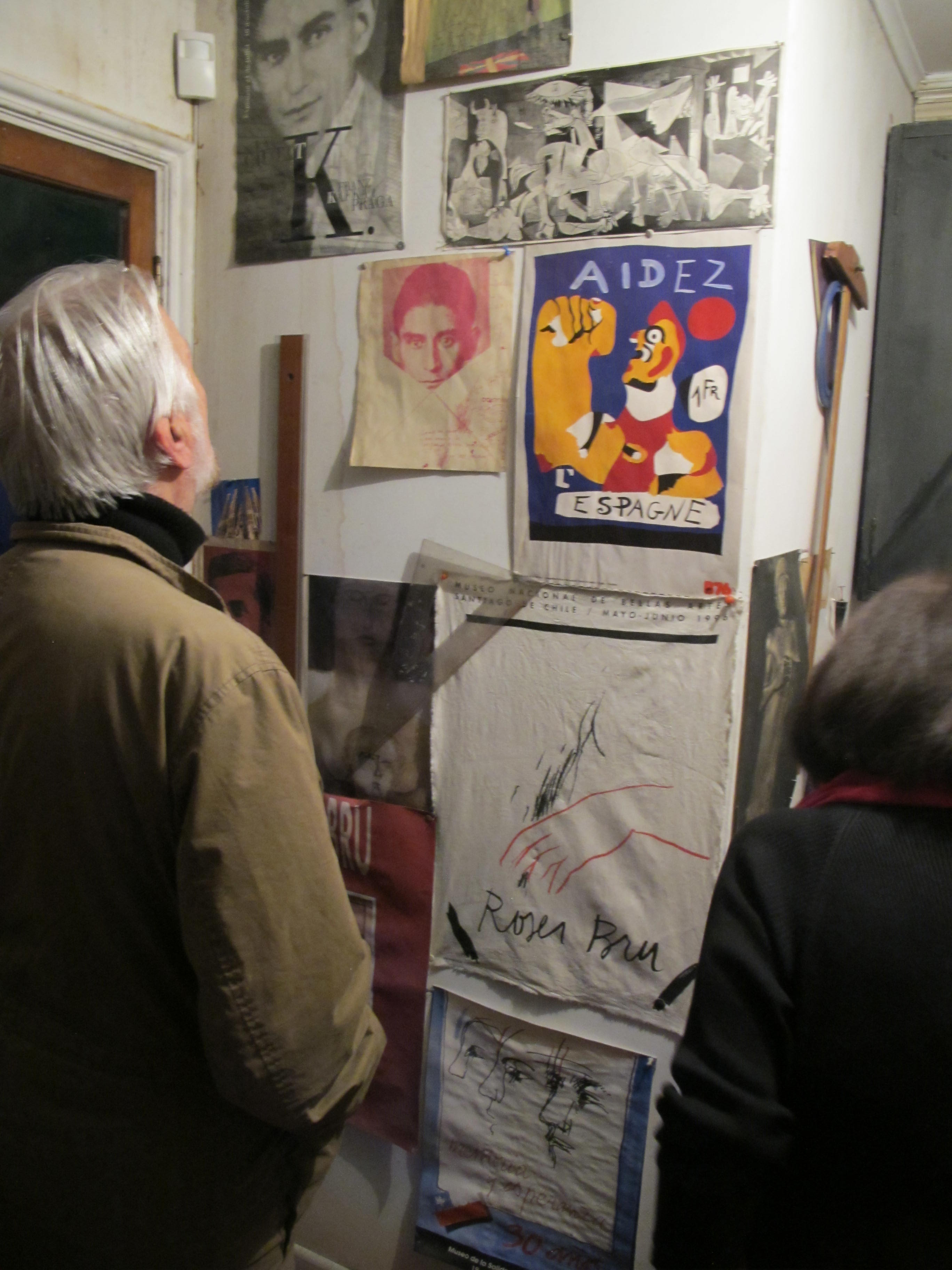
With Spanish painter Javier de Villota in 2013

Roser Bru was born in Barcelona in 1923. The following year her family went into exile in Paris, France, as a result of the dictatorship of Miguel Primo de Rivera. Four years later, they returned to their hometown where Bru studied at the Montessori School and later, in 1931, at the Institut-Escola de la Generalitat de Catalunya. After the Spanish Civil War, in 1939, she moved back to France, where she embarked for Chile on the SS Winnipeg. She arrived in Valparaíso on 3 September of that year.

She studied painting at the School of Fine Arts of the University of Chile from 1939 to 1942, where she was a student of Pablo Burchard and Israel Roa. In 1947 she joined the Plastic Students Group, along with other artists such as José Balmes, Gracia Barrios, and Guillermo Núñez. In 1957 she began her engraving studies at Taller 99, directed by Nemesio Antúnez.

Bru exhibited in several countries in Latin America, as well as in Spain, while some of her works are in the Museum of Modern Art in New York, the Brooklyn Museum, the Santiago Museum of Contemporary Art, the Chiloé Museum of Modern Art, the Chilean National Museum of Fine Arts, the Museo de la Solidaridad Salvador Allende, the National Historical Museum, the Metropolitan Museum of Art, the Museum of Modern Art in Rio de Janeiro, and the Staatliche Museen in Berlin, among others.

Roser Bru died in Santiago on 26 May 2021 at the age of 98.

== Recognition ==
In 1995 Bru was decorated by King Juan Carlos I of Spain when she was named Commander of the Order of Isabella the Catholic.

In 2000 she received the Altazor Award of the National Arts in the Painting category for Enseñanzas de Goya. In 2013 she won in the same category for Vivir en obra. In 2004 she received a nomination in the Engraving and Drawing category for Un conjunto de sus 34 grabados en su cumpleaños número ochenta. In 2005 she received another nomination in the same category for Obra en exposición Pablo Neruda, la infancia del poeta.

In 2005 she was granted the Pablo Neruda Order of Artistic and Cultural Merit.

In 2015, the Government of Chile awarded her the National Prize for Plastic Arts.
