= Lily Garafulic =

Chilean sculptor

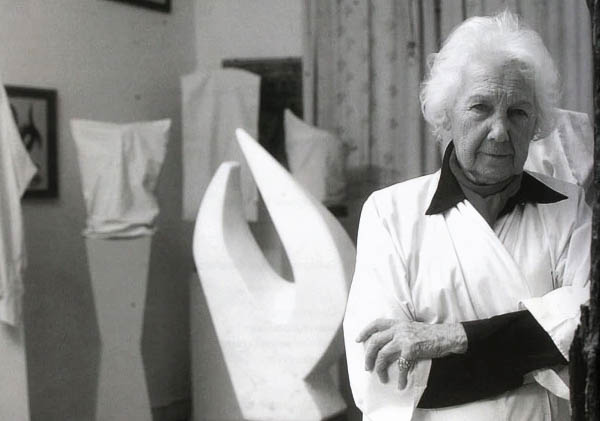
- Born: May 14, 1914; Antofagasta
- Died: March 15, 2012; Santiago
- Education: Atelier 17
- Occupations: Sculptor, painter
- Awards: Guggenheim Fellowship

Signature
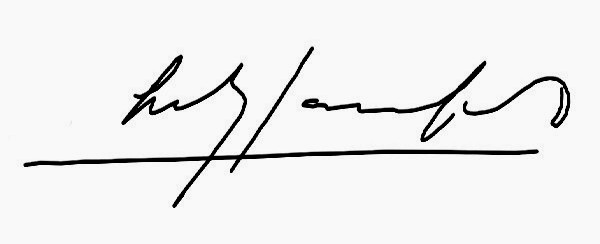

Lily Garafulic Yankovic (May 14, 1914 – March 15, 2012) was a Chilean sculptor, a member of the Generation of 40 (Generación del 40) artists, and museum director. Garafulic was a recipient of a Guggenheim Fellowship in New York City in 1944.

== Career ==
Lily Garafulic began attending the School of Fine Arts at the University of Chile in 1934, where she studied under the sculptor Lorenzo Domínguez. In 1944, she was awarded a Guggenheim Fellowship to New York City, where she studied at the New School of Social Research (now called The New School) and worked with the engraver and printmaker Stanley William Hayter at Atelier 17.

Garafulic was primarily a sculptor, working with marble, wood, bronze, and terra cotta. She also created many works on paper. Among Garafulic's most noted works are statues of sixteen prophets placed on the top of Lourdes Basilica in Santiago, Chile.

She was a member of the Generation of 40 (Generación del 40) artists, which included other Chilean sculptors, including Marta Colvin.

Garafulic became a professor of sculpture at the University of Chile in 1951. Her students included Sergio Badilla Castillo and Raúl Valdivieso. She became a professor emerita at the University of Chile in 1997. She also served as the director of the Chilean National Museum of Fine Arts from 1973 until 1977.

She received the Premio Nacional de Artes Plásticas award in 1995. A centennial exhibit celebrating her work was displayed at the Chilean Embassy in Washington DC in 2014. A documentary titled "Lily Garafulic: In Her Words" was made about her life by her niece, Gloria Garafulich-Grabois. The documentary premiered in 2014.

== Personal life ==
Lily Garafulic was born in Antofagasta, Chile, on May 14, 1914. She is of Croatian descent. She died on March 15, 2012, at her home in the Parque Forestal section of Santiago, Chile, at the age of 97.

== Awards ==
- 1936: Third Prize of the Salón Oficial. Santiago de Chile.
- 1937: Medal IV Centenary of the city of Valparaíso, Chile.
- 1940: Second Prize for Sculpture, VIII Salón de Verano, Viña del Mar.
- 1941: First Prize for Sculpture, IV Centenario Fundación de Santiago.
- 1942: Second Prize for Sculpture, LIV Salón Oficial. Santiago de Chile.
- 1943: First Prize, Salón de Verano. Viña del Mar.
- 1944: Guggenheim Fellowship, New York City
- 1945: First Prize, Dibujo y Grabado Salón Oficial Santiago de Chile.
- 1945: First Prize, Salón de Verano. Viña del Mar.
- 1947: First Prize for Sculpture, Salón Oficial. Santiago de Chile.
- 1953: Honorary Award, LXIV Salón Oficial. Santiago de Chile.
- 1961: First "Rebeca Matte", sculpture section, Salón de Verano, Viña del Mar.
- 1963: Honorable Mention, IX Bienal de São Paulo, Brasil.
- 1985: Award of the Circle of Chilean Critics (Círculo de Críticos de Chile). Santiago de Chile.
- 1992: "Rebeca Matte" Award, Ministry of Education. Santiago de Chile.
- 1995: National Prize for Plastic Arts of Chile (Premio Nacional de Artes Plásticas de Chile).
