= National Award for Plastic Arts =

National Award for Plastic Arts or National Prize for Plastic Arts may refer to:

- National Award for Visual Arts, Catalonia, formerly Premi Nacional d'Arts Plàstiques
- National Prize for Plastic Arts (Chile)
- National Award for Plastic Arts (Cuba)
- National Award for Plastic Arts (Spain)
- National Prize of Plastic Arts of Venezuela
