= Francisco Gazitúa =

Chilean sculptor (born 1944)

- Born: 1944 (age 81–82); Santiago, Chile
- Education: University of Chile
- Occupation: Sculptor
- Awards: National Prize for Plastic Arts (Chile) (2021)

Francisco Gazitúa (born 1944) is a Chilean sculptor known for large-scale works and public art. He was awarded the Chilean National Prize for Plastic Arts in 2021.

== Biography and career ==
After beginning studies in philosophy, he enrolled in 1967 at the School of Fine Arts of the University of Chile to study sculpture, where he was a student of sculptors Marta Colvin, Lily Garafulic, and Sergio Castillo. In 1977, he received a scholarship to study Advanced Sculpture at Saint Martin's School of Art in England, where he trained under artists such as Anthony Caro, Tim Scott, and Philip King. In 1979, he was appointed professor at the same institution, and in 1984 he returned to Chile.

Between 1996 and 1999, he led the Sculpture Department at Finis Terrae University in Chile. Since 2008, he has been part of the MetroArte commission, responsible for comissioning public artworks in the Santiago Metro.

In 2012, Gazitúa, in collaboration with engineers Peter Sheffield and the MMM Group, designed and built Puente de Luz ("Bridge of Light"), a 125-meter pedestrian in Toronto, Canada.

In 2017, he was named a member of the Chilean Academy of Fine Arts, and in 2021 he received the National Prize for Plastic Arts. In 2024, Gazitúa was recognized as one of the 50 most creative Chileans by the local edition of Forbes.

In 2023, Pluma de sietecolores ("Seven-Colored Feather"), a 20-meter-high sculpture created with visual artist Angela Leible, was installed at the Pan-American Promenade in the Villa Panamericana de Santiago for the 2023 Pan American Games.

He has also been a visiting professor at the Royal College of Art. Gazitúa helped found the Kornarija International Sculpture School in Kornarija, Croatia, and has taught marble sculpture in Portugal.

== Work ==
His works have been described as "revealing a poetic vision and fidelity to Andean and European cultural traditions". The award citation for the 2021 National Prize for Plastic Arts (Chile) highlighted his "aesthetic vision embracing the diverse territories of our country, reflected in very distinctive local materials".

In a 2022 interview with CNN Chile, Gazitúa explained his interest in public art:

"My teachers here in Chile, Marta Colvin and Samuel Román, are everywhere with abstract works (…) They taught me that sculpture should not be confined to museums—it belongs in public spaces as well."

=== Gallery ===
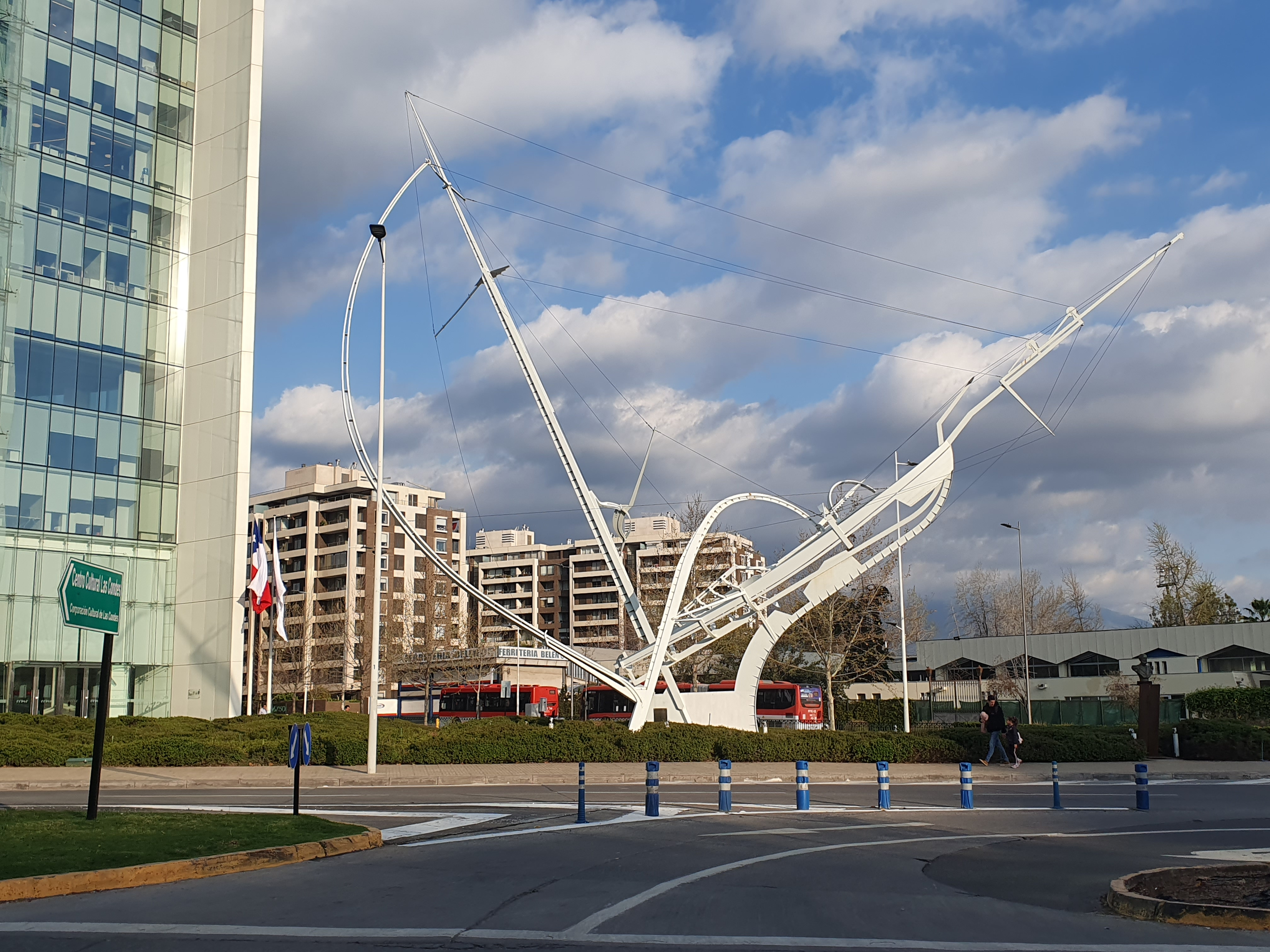
Esmeralda II in Santiago (2000)

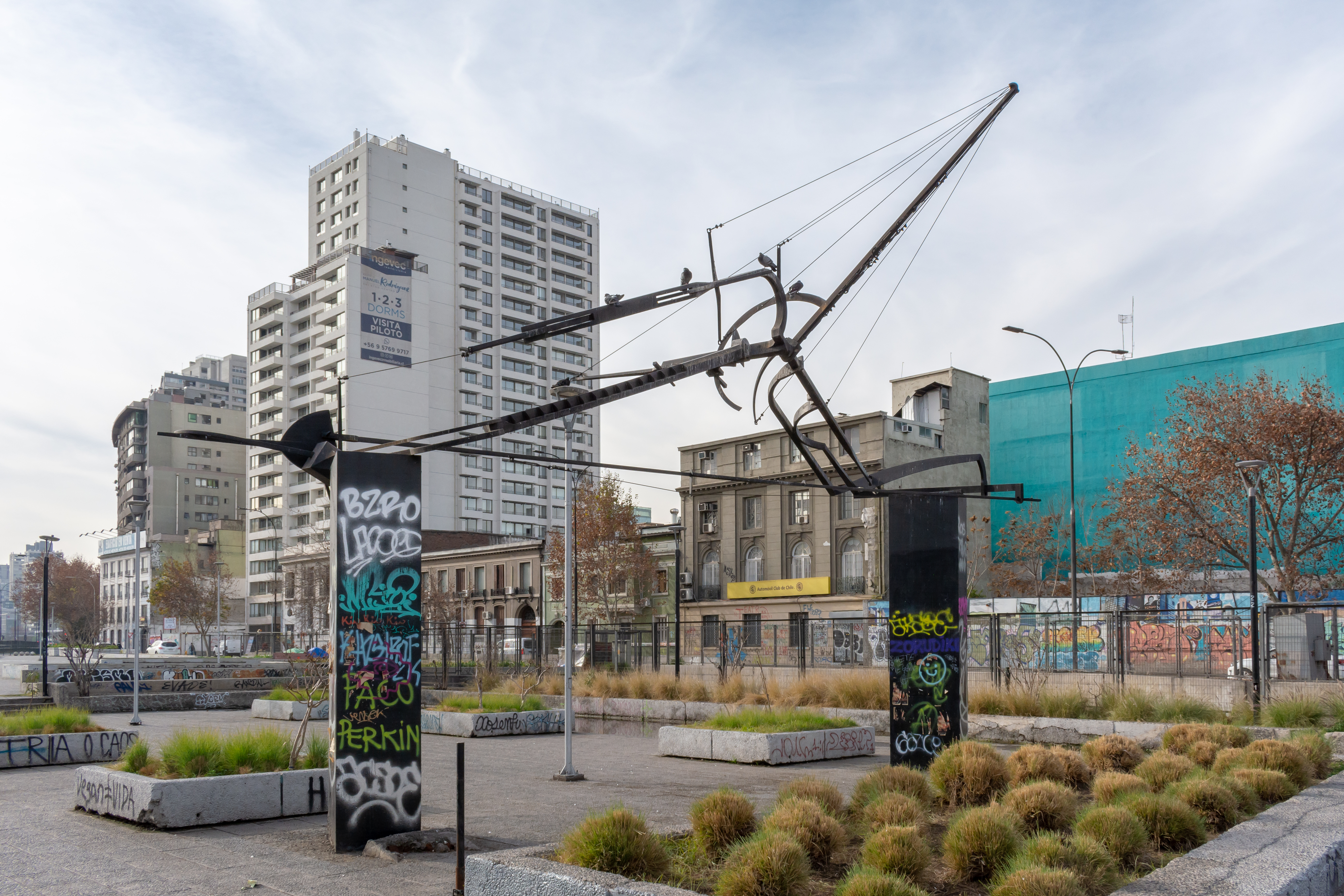
Puente hacia Kiev in Santiago (2000)

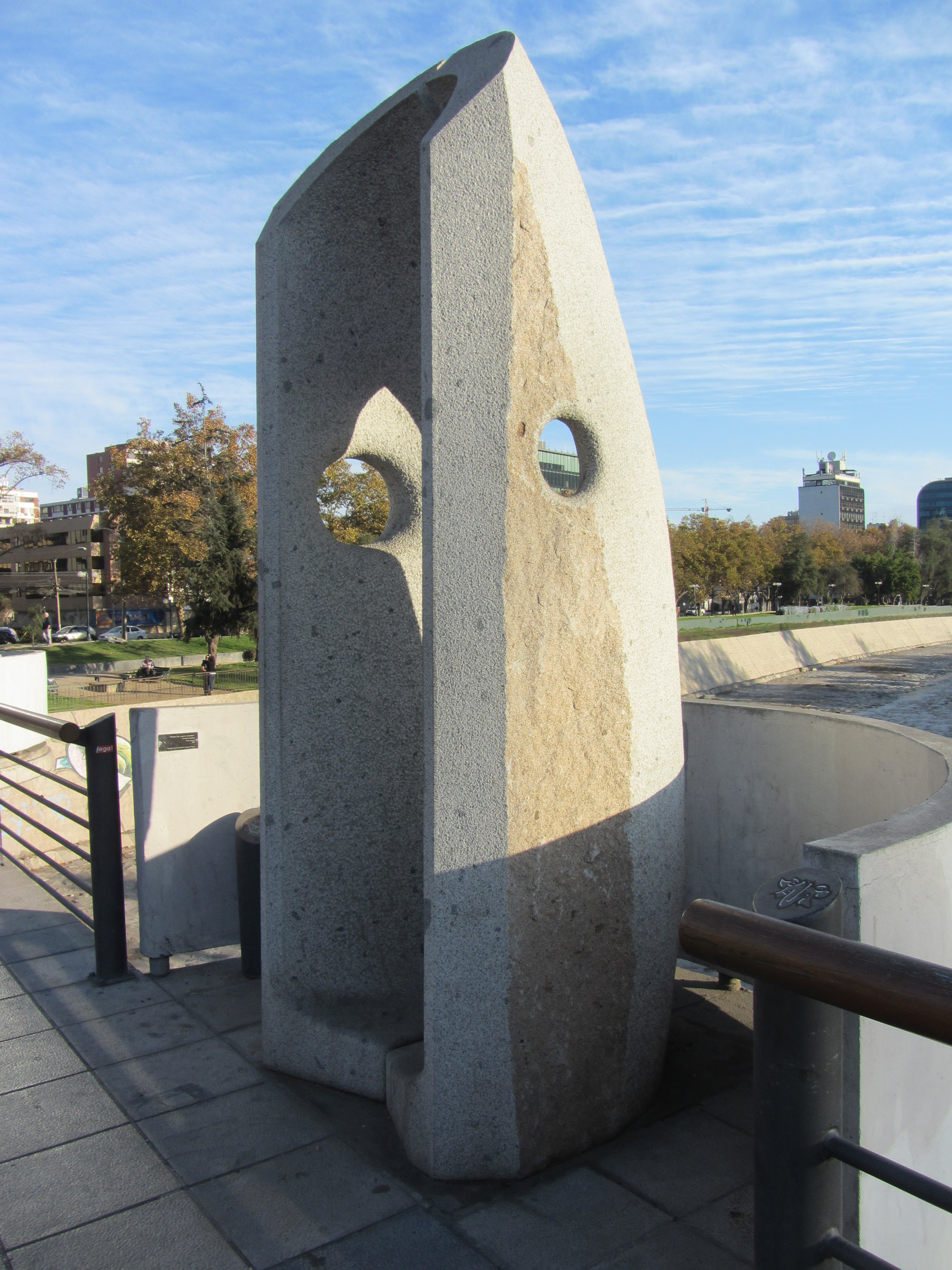
Piedra de 4 Miradas in Santiago (2015)

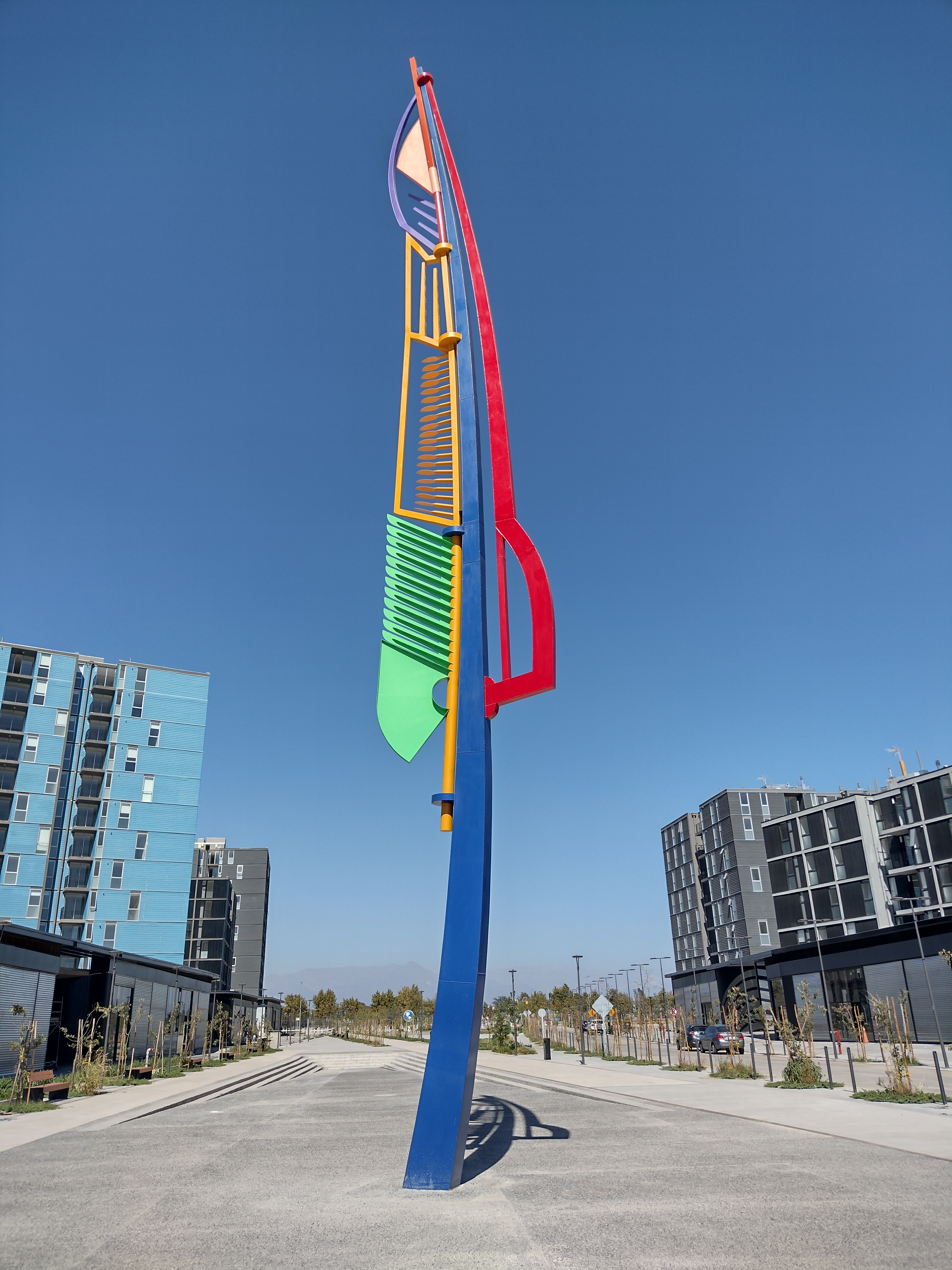
Pluma de sietecolores in Santiago (2023)
