= Victor Delhez =

Belgian artist (1902–1985)

- Born: 16 March 1902; Antwerp, Belgium
- Died: 4 January 1985 (aged 82); Mendoza, Argentina
- Education: Royal Academy of Fine Arts; Catholic University of Leuven
- Occupation: Artist
- Style: Wood engraving
- Website: victordelhez.com

Victor Delhez (16 March 1902 – 4 January 1985), best known for his woodcut engravings, was born in Antwerp, Belgium, and died in Mendoza, Argentina.

== Life ==
=== Early life and education ===
Delhez was one of seven children. He studied at Antwerp's Royal Academy of Fine Arts from 1916-1918 and at the University of Leuven from 1918–1923, graduating as an agronomist with chemistry as his primary subject.

=== Career ===
Delhez began exhibiting caricatures and surrealist work while in college. Taking up a role as manager of his family's car company, he continued his artistic interests, publishing a series of prints in 1925.

In 1925, Delhez's parents died in a road accident. He left his job as manager of his father's motorcar company and moved to Argentina, working as a draughtsman, architect and contractor in Buenos Aires from 1926–1933. He then moved to Bolivia, before moving back to Argentina in 1940. He settled in Chacras de Coria and took a post as professor at the Academy of Fine Arts, National University of Cuyo.

While in Bolivia, Delhez produced a set of forty illustrations for the Gospels, and twenty-one for Lord Dunsany's "A Dreamer's Tales", while in correspondence with the author. The Gospel woodcuts are notable for using South American settings for the illustrations.

Delhez became better known from the 1930s, with what is considered to be his best work beginning during his time in Bolivia. His major themes included the Gospels and the Book of Apocalypse, illustrations for various literary works including books by Dostoevsky and Baudelaire, a series of woodcuts entitled Architecture and Nostalgia, the Dance of Death series, illustrations for Juan Draghi Lucero's "Las Mil y Una Noches Argentinas" (One Thousand and One Argentinian Nights), portraits and self-portraits, and abstract works including the so-called Bagatelle-Linos. He was exhibited, either alone or in conjunction with other artists, in Europe, the United States, Canada, South and Central America, and Japan, including cities such as Brussels (his sisters arranging a show of his "A Dreamer's Tales" works), Antwerp (Plantin-Moretus), at the Smithsonian in Washington, D.C., and at the Metropolitan Museum of Art in New York City. Victor Delhez tended to produce short runs from his blocks, often eight copies of each print labeled as artist's proofs, which has left some of his work scarce in original form. Many of his works were intended for use as illustrations for literary works and are commonly known in their published format. A mid-1950s catalog of his work prepared in conjunction with an exhibit of his works in Breda, Netherlands includes more than 900 items, with an unknown number of additional works prepared during the final decades of his life. The catalog organizes Delhez's woodcuts into thematic categories.

== Scholarship and recognition ==
The sculptor Lorenzo Domínguez made a marble image of Delhez in the early 1940s.

Two books examining Delhez's artistic work were completed during his lifetime - Fernando Diez de Medina's 1938 study, "El Arte Nocturno de Victor Delhez", and a 1969 study by Guillermo Petra Sierralta, "Victor Delhez: Apocalipsis, Danza Macabre, Grabado en Colores".

Delhez has continued to receive attention in the years since his death. In 2014, Pope Francis (a fellow Argentinian) used a Delhez woodcut depicting the Nativity as the illustration for the Vatican Christmas greeting card. In 2015, two major exhibits of his works were held at the Museo de Artes Plásticas Eduardo Sívori in Buenos Aires, Argentina and at the Casa Municipal de Cultura in Santa Cruz, Bolivia. In 2016, two additional major Delhez exhibits took place at the Espacio Cultural Julio Le Parc in Mendoza, Argentina and at the FeliXart Museum in Drogenbos, Belgium. In 2015, scholars Roxana Jorajuria and Gabriela Menéndez presented a paper discussing Delhez as a pioneer Latin American modern artist at the Congreso Nacional e Internacional de Historia del Arte, Cultura y Sociedad, held at the Universidad Nacional de Cuyo in Mendoza, Argentina.

== Holdings ==
Delhez's works are found in numerous museums, including more than 350 prints in the Royal Library of Belgium in Brussels, about 275 prints at the State College of Florida, Manatee-Sarasota in Bradenton, Florida, about 100 prints held by the Museum Plantin-Moretus in Antwerp, Belgium as well as works at the Museum of Modern Art in New York City, at the Baltimore Museum of Art (which issued in 2014 a video blog concerning a Delhez print, Scherzo in Gold, from his Dance of Death series), and in museums in Argentina and other South American locations.
