= Basilica of Lourdes, Santiago =

Church in Quinta Normal, Chile

Coordinates: 33°26′18.3″S 70°41′9.9″W

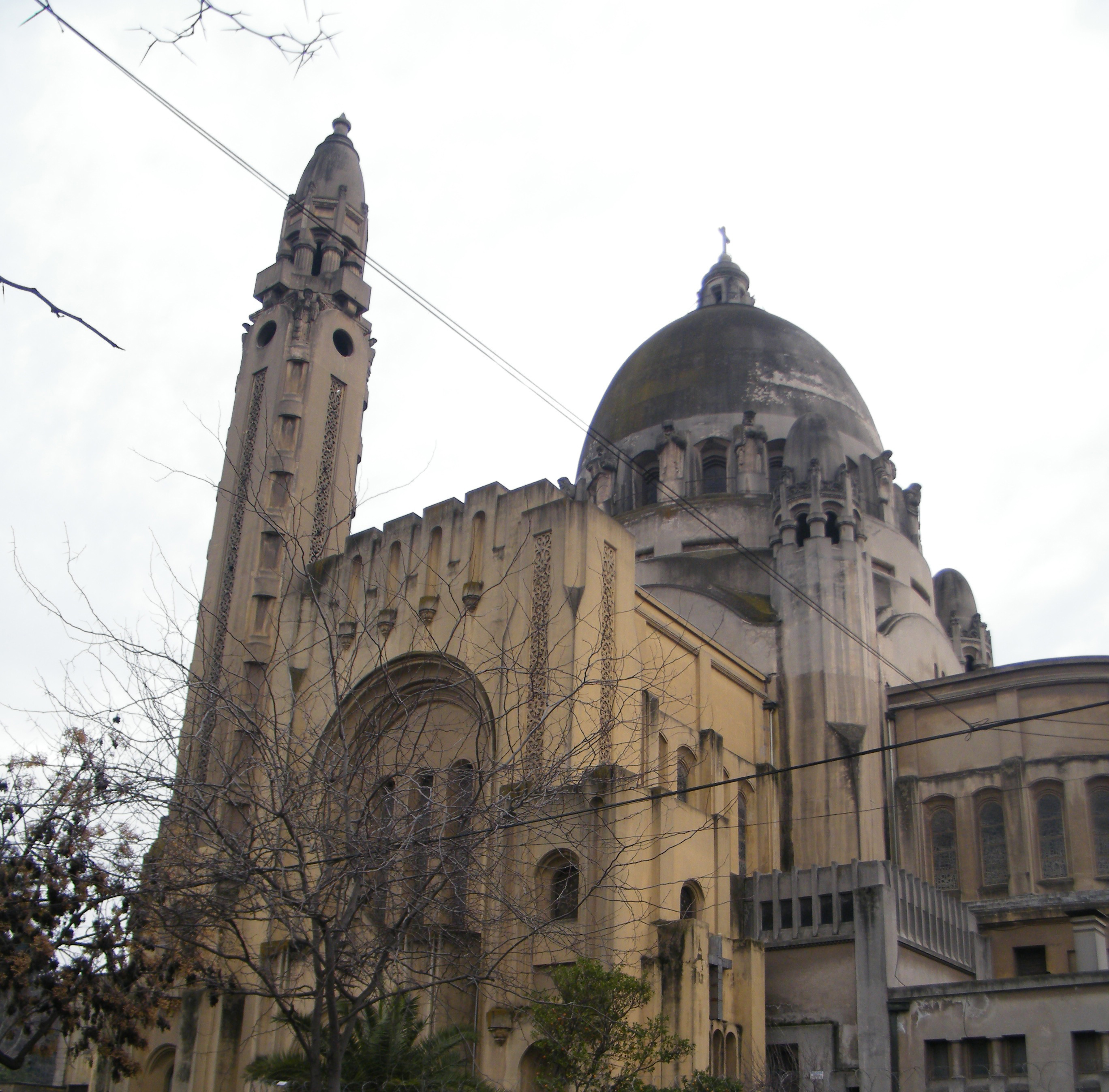
Basilica of Lourdes

The Basilica of Lourdes is a church in Santiago, Chile. It stands laterally opposite the Quinta Normal Park.

The basilica was planned in the 1930s. Designed by architects Eduardo Costabal and Andrés Garafulic, the church is built in the neo-Byzantine style. It features stained glass windows by Gabriel Loire Studio, covering 650 m^{2} (7,000 sq ft). The base of the main dome is ringed by 16 statues of prophets, which is a work by sculptor Lily Garafulic.

A Gruta de Lourdes faces the main facade of the basilica, which gives its name to the relatively nearby Gruta de Lourdes metro station.
