= Gracia Barrios =

Chilean painter (1927–2020)

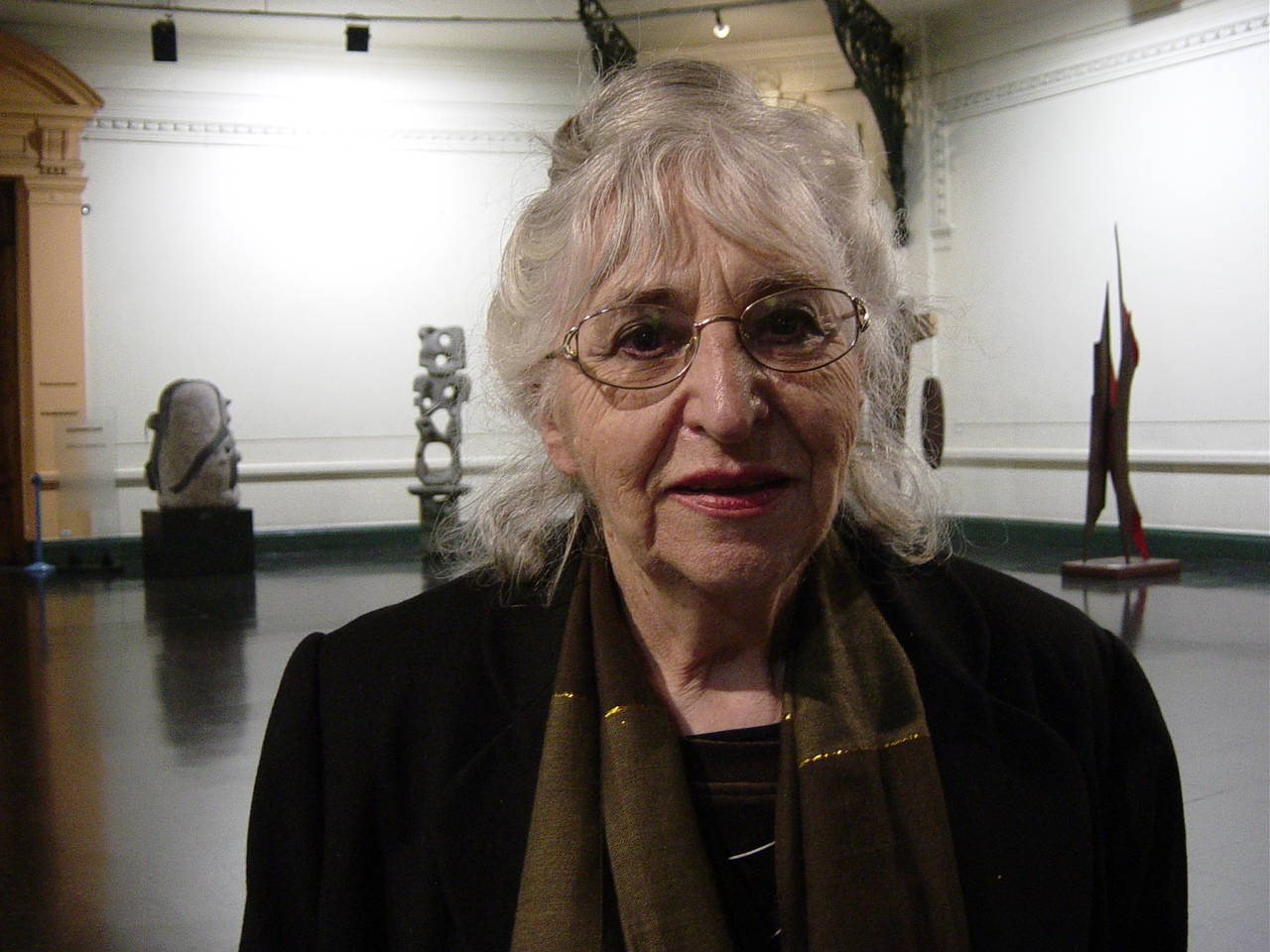
- Barios in 2007
- Born: Gracia Barrios Rivadeneira; 27 June 1927; Santiago, Chile
- Died: 28 May 2020 (aged 92)
- Education: University of Chile
- Occupation: Painter
- Spouse: José Balmes (m. 1952; died 2016)
- Children: Concepción Balmes
- Parents: Eduardo Barrios (father); Carmen Rivadeneira (mother)
- Awards: National Prize for Plastic Arts (2011)

Gracia Barrios Rivadeneira (27 June 1927 – 28 May 2020) was a Chilean painter and the winner of the 2011 National Prize for Plastic Arts.

== Biography ==
The daughter of writer Eduardo Barrios (winner of the 1946 National Prize for Literature) and pianist Carmen Rivadeneira, Gracia Barrios was interested in art from an early age. She took classes with the painter Carlos Isamitt and later, while still in school, attended evening classes at the School of Fine Arts of the University of Chile. After high school, she continued her higher education at the aforementioned university from 1944 to 1949. There she had as teachers Augusto Eguiluz, Carlos Pedraza, and Pablo Burchard, the latter having the greatest influence on her style.

Barrios began her teaching career in 1953, at her alma mater, as an assistant in the drawing workshop of Carlos Pedraza. Later she assumed other positions, until 1973. During the 1960s she belonged to Grupo Signo, which broke with Post-Impressionism and advocated an abandonment of easel painting. Among the other members of the group were Alberto Pérez, José Balmes, and Eduardo Martínez Bonati. In 1962 the group held exhibitions in Spain and France.

After the 1973 Chilean coup d'état, the artist went into exile in France along with her husband and daughter; they remained out of Chile for approximately ten years.

Upon returning, Barrios worked as a visiting professor at the Catholic University from 1983 to 1986, and beginning in 1994 was a professor at Finis Terrae University. She ended her teaching career some years later. "Before, art was more democratic because it revolved more around the University of Chile [...] That's why there were artists from all social spectrums. For some time, creation has gone hand in hand with economic power, with having a good surname, with moving in certain spheres. I miss doing classes, but that is one of the reasons why I left it," explained the painter.

In 2011, she won the National Prize for Plastic Arts for her work that, according to the jury, "is distinguished by its incessant search for the human condition and, above all, by the relationship of the human being with its existential and historical contexts."

== Work ==
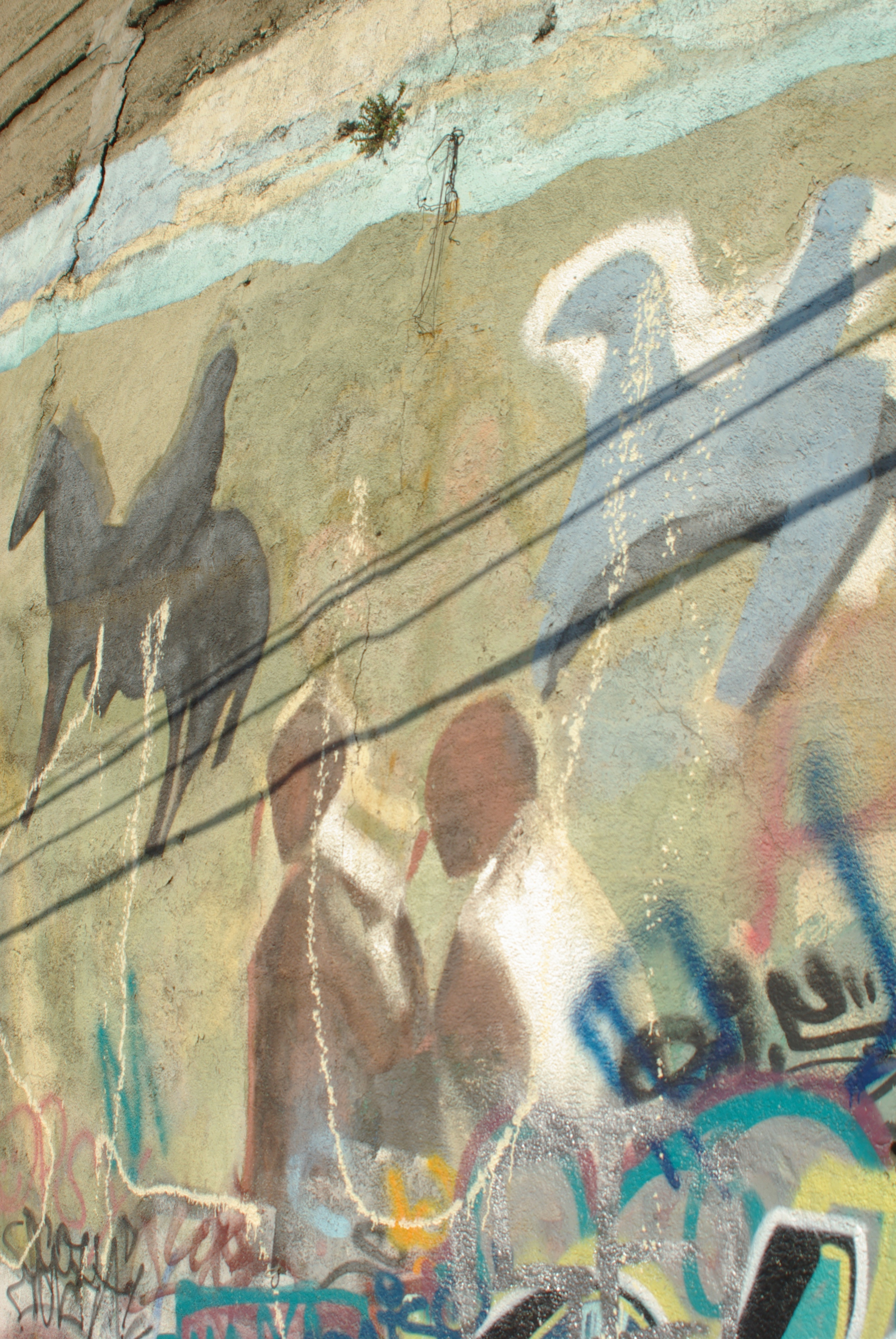
Imagen con caballo negro, mural no. 2 of the Valparaíso Open-Air Museum

The work of Gracia Barrios focuses on "human activity in everyday life." Although she initially opted for figurative painting, towards the 1960s she changed to a more informal style, called "informal realism" by the artist herself. With this, Barrios alluded to the man "by means of the monumentality of torsos, heads, and maternities, expressing also the direct approach with the American continent and its people." Some of the themes she tackled in her paintings were war, indigence, and exile.

In addition to using oil and acrylic paints, the artist experimented with natural elements such as earth and clay in order to give greater density to her works.

Her paintings have been exhibited in countries such as Spain, France, Germany, Brazil, and Japan, and adorn not only Chilean museums, but also some European ones, such as the Barcelona Museum of Contemporary Art and the André Malraux Museum of Le Havre.

== Personal life ==
In 1943, while attending free courses at the University of Chile, Barrios met the Catalan painter José Balmes. They were introduced by the poet Enrique Lihn. They married in 1952 and had a daughter, Concepción Balmes, who is also a painter.

Garcia Barrios died from COVID-19 on 28 May 2020, at the age of 92.

== Awards and recognitions ==
- 1957 – First Prize for Drawing, 68th Official Salon, Santiago
- 1958 – Second Prize for Painting, 69th Official Salon, Santiago
- 1959 – Second Prize, 70th Official Salon, Santiago
- 1964 – Second Prize, Esso Salon, Museum of Contemporary Art, University of Chile, Santiago
- 1965 – First CRAV Prize for Painting, Santiago
- 1965 – Second Prize, Painting, Esso Salon for Young Artists, Pan American Union, Washington, United States
- 1966 – First Prize for Painting, 76th Official Salon, Santiago
- 1968 – Second Prize, American Biennial of Quito, Ecuador
- 1971 – Prize of Honor of the 15th Ñuñoa Salon, Santiago
- 1988 – Achievement Award, Mural of the Worker's Hospital, Santiago
- 1996 – Municipal Art Prize, Municipality of Santiago
- 2011 – National Prize for Plastic Arts
