= José Balmes =

Spanish-Chilean painter (1927–2016)

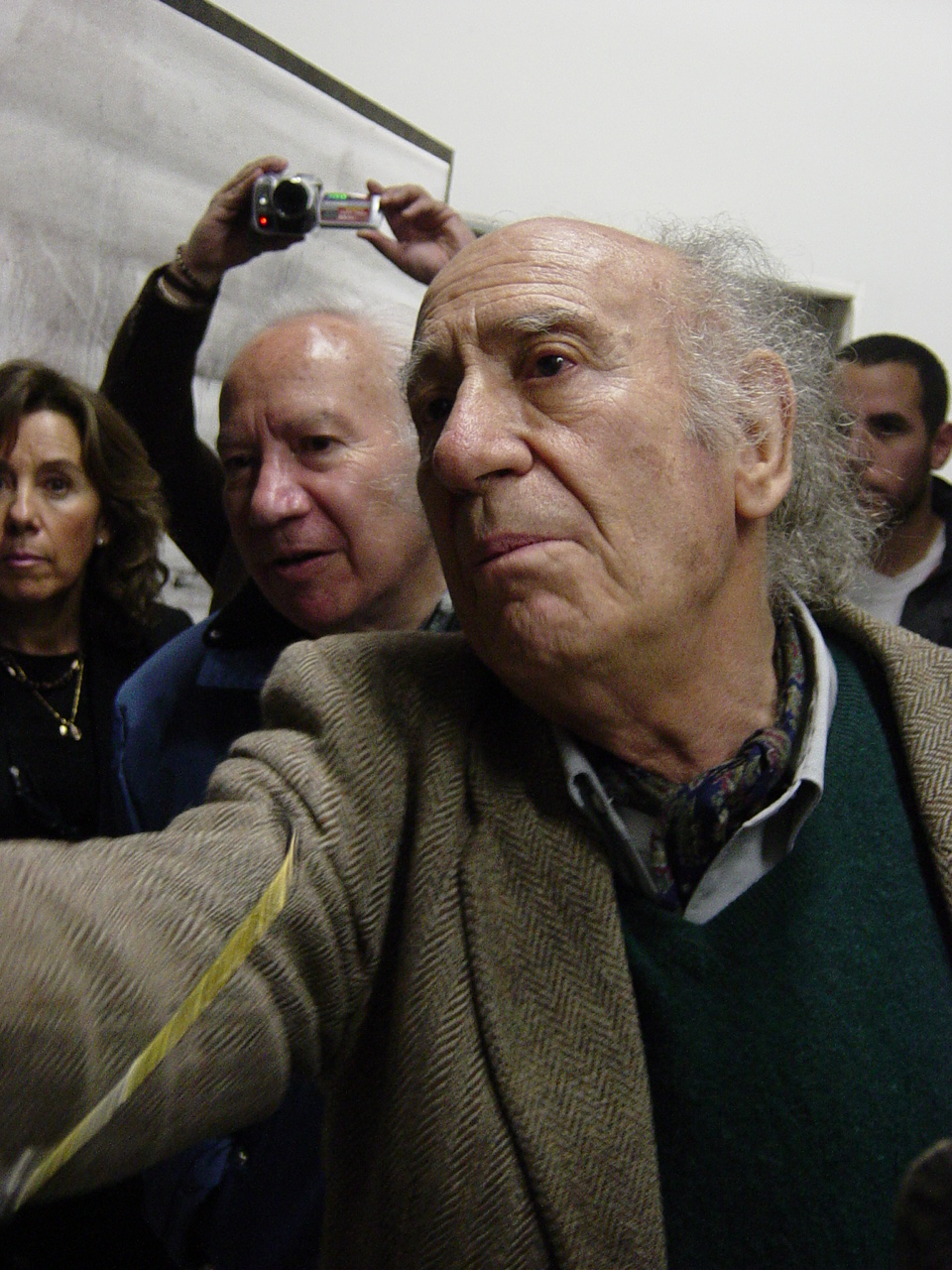
- Balmes in 2007
- Born: José Balmes Parramón; 20 January 1927; Montesquiu, Spain
- Died: 28 August 2016 (aged 89); Santiago, Chile
- Education: University of Chile
- Occupation: Painter
- Political party: Communist Party of Chile
- Spouse: Gracia Barrios (m. 1952)
- Children: 1
- Awards: National Prize for Plastic Arts (1999); Altazor Award (2002)

José Balmes Parramón (20 January 1927 – 28 August 2016) was a Spanish-born painter based in Chile. He received Chile's National Prize for Plastic Arts in 1999.

== Biography ==
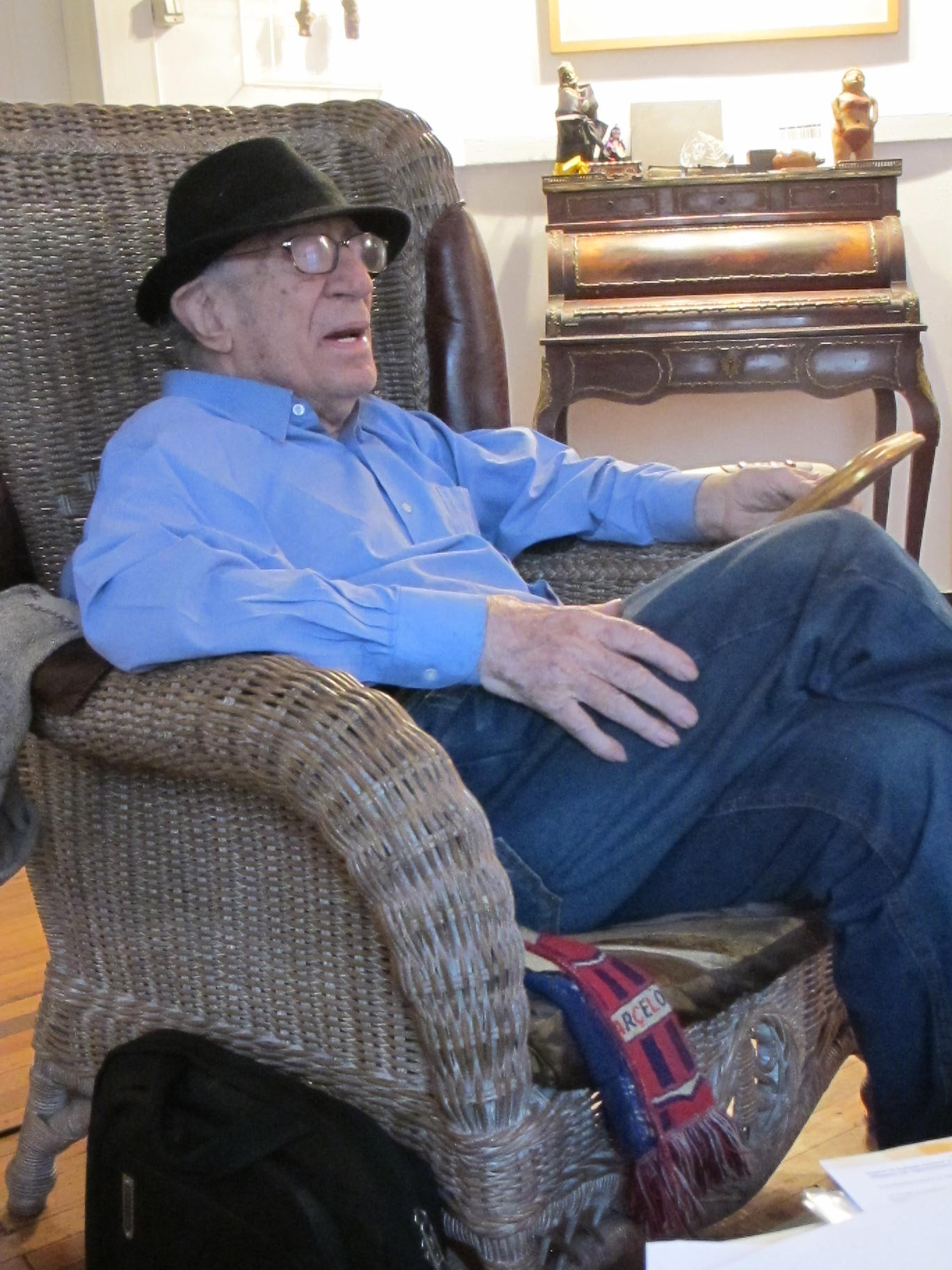
Balmes in his studio in Santiago, 2013

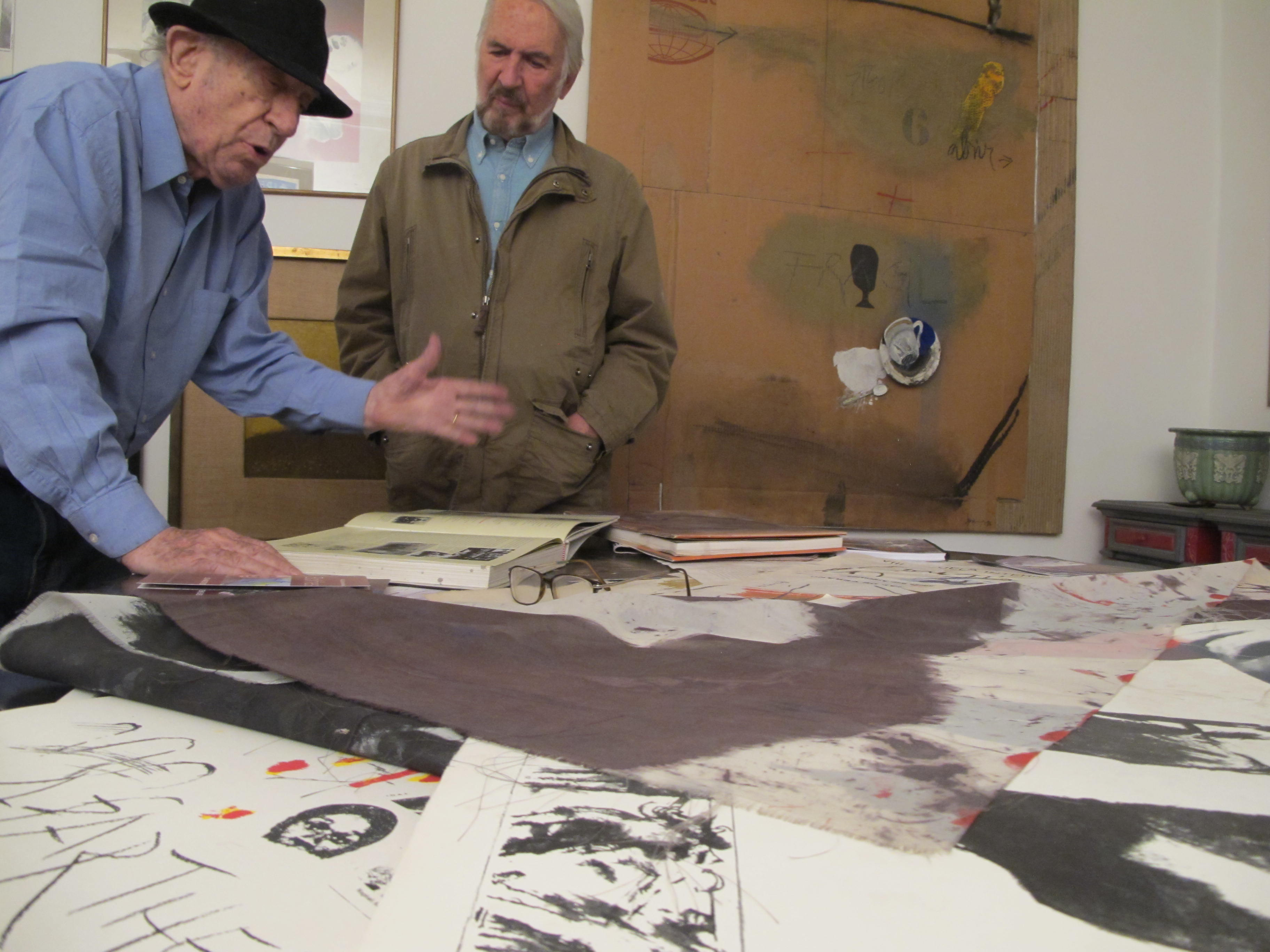
Balmes in his studio with Spanish painter Javier de Villota, 2013

José Balmes was born in 1927 in the town of Montesquiu in Catalonia, where he spent his childhood until the Spanish Civil War broke out in 1936. Three years later, after the Nationalist victory, Balmes with his family was forced to leave Spain due to the militancy of his father, Damià Balmes, who was mayor of the town for the Republican Left of Catalonia.

He traveled to Chile on the SS Winnipeg, after the aid of that country's government to the Spanish Republicans. In what would become his new homeland, Balmes completed secondary education at the Liceo Barros Borgoño, and in 1943 he entered the School of Fine Arts of the University of Chile. There he had Pablo Burchard and Camilo Mori as teachers. In 1947 he obtained Chilean nationality.

At the university, he interacted with other artists, including future National Arts Prize winner Gracia Barrios, whom he would marry in 1952. The couple had a daughter, Concepción Balmes, who is also a painter.

Balmes would continue to be linked to the University of Chile as an academic (1950–1973) and dean of the Faculty of Arts (1972–1973). Among his disciples is Patricio Court, who was his student of painting, as well as Francisco Brugnoli, Eugenio Dittborn, Patricia Israel, and Eugenio Téllez.

Along with Gracia Barrios and other artists, he would form the informalist Grupo Signo, with whom he would present works in Barcelona, Madrid, and Paris.

Of known communist militancy, and having been for several periods a member of the Communist Party's Central Committee, a large part of Balmes' career was linked to political life, actively supporting the Popular Unity government led by Salvador Allende, and having to leave for exile in France after the 1973 coup d'état. There he continued developing his artistic career as a professor at Pantheon-Sorbonne University.

In 1986, Balmes returned to Chile, after which he received multiple awards, such as the 1999 National Prize for Plastic Arts and the 2002 Altazor.

In 2012 the Chilean filmmaker Pablo Trujillo Novoa shot a documentary about the life of the artist entitled Balmes: El doble exilio de la pintura (Balmes: Painting's Double Exile).

José Balmes died on 28 August 2016 at the Clínica Las Condes, where he had been hospitalized for pneumonia since the beginning of that month.

== Awards ==
- Prize of Honor at the Salon of Alumni of the School of Fine Arts (1946)
- Second Honorific Prize for foreigners of the Official Salon of Santiago (1948)
- First Prize of the Official Salon, National Museum of Fine Arts, Santiago (1951)
- Prize of Honor of the Official Salon of Santiago (1958)
- Award of the 2nd Biennale of Mexico (1960)
- Honorable Mention at the 2nd Paris Biennale dedicated to young artists (1961)
- First Prize, Mention in Painting, CRAV contest of Valparaíso (1963)
- Special Award, Esso contest (1964)
- First Prize, Mention in Drawing, American Art Biennale of Cali, Colombia (1971)
- First Prize for Engraving, International Intergrafik Exposition of Berlín, Germany (1977)
- Critical Award, Santiago (1984)
- First Prize of the Ibero-American Biennale for art on paper in Buenos Aires, Argentina (1986)
- Named Professor Emeritus of the Faculty of Architecture and Fine Arts of the Catholic University of Chile (1993)
- Professor Emeritus of the University of Chile (1996)
- Gabriela Mistral Order of Teaching and Merit granted by the government of Chile (1997)
- Michoacán Award, Mention in Painting, granted by the National Culture Commission of the Communist Party of Chile (1997)
- National Prize for Plastic Arts, Santiago, Chile (1999)
- Altazor Award, Santiago, Chile (2002)
