= Lorenzo Domínguez =

Chilean sculptor and educator (1901–1963)

- Born: Lorenzo Domínguez Villar; 1901; Santiago, Chile
- Died: 1963 (aged 61–62); Mendoza, Argentina

Academic work
- Institutions: School of Fine Arts of Santiago; National University of Cuyo

Lorenzo Domínguez Villar (1901 – 1963) was a Chilean sculptor and educator.

== Introduction ==
Lorenzo Domínguez's art is the antithesis of the idea of "autochthony" and "cultural unity". In fact, his life of constant and lasting migrations across continents and through multiple countries could be used as an example of the limitations of a nationalistic approach to the history of art. He was born in Santiago de Chile in 1901. He spent his childhood and adolescence in Santiago, but as a child he stayed for a whole year at a boarding school in Málaga, in southern Spain. During his youth he spent ten years in Madrid, Spain, where he began to sculpt. At thirty, he returned to Santiago de Chile. There, he continued sculpting and began teaching sculpture at the university. During the Spanish Civil War he went to Barcelona for a few months. He then spent a year in Paris, frequenting some famous sculpture workshops. At forty, he moved to Argentina, where he lived for almost twenty years in the cities of Mendoza and Tucumán, teaching at the university and creating sculptures, embossed metal plates and drawings. In January 1960, he traveled to Easter Island or Rapa Nui, where he spent thirteen months studying the Island's artistic treasures and creating drawings and sculptures of his own. He returned to Argentina in February 1961. In 1963 he died in Mendoza at the age of sixty-one.

Defining him as Chilean, or Argentine or European because of the place in which he was born, or learned to sculpt, or worked, would be reductive. Lorenzo Domínguez was a Latin American artist who lived his artistic life under the sign of certain syncretisms. Before his encounter with Easter Island, the artist synthesized the Spanish and French artistic perspectives acquired during his formative years with certain Latin American pre-Columbian artistic features, like privileging stone over other classical sculpting materials such as bronze or wood, or privileging local stones over the more traditional Carrara marble, or using the technique of direct carving. The encounter with the moais and petroglyphs of Easter Island, is not felt by Lorenzo Domínguez as the incorporation of a "foreign" element, but as a continuity: in his eyes, Easter Island, with its “stones that look like sculptures and its sculptures that look like simple stones” gives form to Michelangelo's dream of "sculpting the mountains", as he says in his Easter Island journals. The encounter with Easter Island and with an aesthetics signed by both monumentality and line, offers Domínguez the opportunity for a new synthesis of European, Latin American pre-Columbian and Rapa Nui artistic elements.

== Artistic production: sculptures, embossed metal plates and drawings ==
Lorenzo Domínguez completed 252 sculptures that have been photographed and described in the 1998 General Catalog. Although he worked in a great variety of materials, his preferred sculpting media was stone, mainly because he conceived sculpting as a struggle between the artist and the material resisting him. He thought that "there is no quality in an art that occurs without a struggle", and that materials like clay and plaster are "too soft and obedient", while "stone resists, but at the same time cooperates... If there is a struggle, stone itself guides the sculptor's hand" Of Lorenzo Domínguez's sculptures 76 are in stone or marble; 34 in bronze; 5 in wood; 9 in ceramics; 13 in cement; and 115 in plaster. Some of these sculptures were public monuments to Santiago Ramón y Cajal, to Johann Sebastian Bach, to Louis Pasteur, to Dr. Luis Calvo Mackenna, to Leandro N. Alem, to José de San Martín and Bernardo O'Higgins, to Dr. Miguel Lillo and to Plato. Many of Lorenzo Domínguez's sculptures are portraits, others belong to his "Planetarium series" ("Portrait of the Moon", "The Planet Venus", "The Planet Saturn", "The Milky Way", "Berenice" and "The Morning Star"), some are nudes or torsos, some have existential or metaphysical subjects ("Death", "Hope", "Time Hieroglyph"), some have a political subject ("The Unknown Political Prisoner", "Barcelona", "Peace"), some have religious subjects ("Christ", "The Virgin of Hope", "Saint Olalla"), some are of Latin American inspiration ("Llaima-Llaima", "María Coya", "La Cuyanita"), and some are of Easter Island inspiration ("Father Sebastian Englert from Easter Island" and "Young Girl from Easter Island").

Lorenzo Domínguez created 34 large embossed metal plates. This is an aesthetic manifestation that is characteristic of his work. It goes beyond what in sculpture is known as a "relief", since it actually implies blending the art of drawing with that of sculpting. Domínguez incorporated techniques used by jewelers, but instead of working with small, thin, precious metal sheets, he worked with iron or copper plates that were several millimeters thick, with an area ranging from 50 x 30 cm. to 1 x 1 m. The long embossing process began with a chalk drawing on the back of the metal plate. Then, the metal plate was placed over a warm tar cake. Finally, the plate was pounded strongly and repeatedly, either with a rounded hammer or with a combination of hammer and chisel, until massive volumes emerged towards the front of the plate.

Lorenzo Domínguez was a draughtsman as well as a sculptor. He started to draw more than ten years after he began to sculpt, and along his artistic life he completed approximately 500 drawings. In the 1998 General Catalog these drawings have been photographed and classified in twenty-three thematic series: Standing nudes, Seated nudes, Reclining nudes, Two nudes, Via Crucis of Don Quixote, Portraits, Religious themes, Maternities, Drawings anticipating Easter Island, Stones, Mythology of Chile, Assorted themes, Moais, Make-Makes, Bird Men, Moai hands, Komaris, Easter Island torsos, Birds, the Flying Bird series, the Marine series, Easter Island stones, and Assorted Easter Island themes.

== Quotes ==
For Lorenzo Domínguez, stone is the authentic form of expression of Latin American art: "In Chile, I realized that sculpture in the Americas should be mainly done in stone, as in pre-Columbian times".

== Life and work ==
=== From 1901 to 1920 (Santiago de Chile and Málaga, Spain) ===
Lorenzo Domínguez was born in Santiago de Chile, on May 15, 1901. His parents, Sebastián Domínguez Aguilar and Ana Villar Urbano, were from the villages of Colmenar and Casabermeja in the Spanish province of Málaga. As a child Lorenzo Domínguez went to Spain with his parents, and lived in Málaga for a year studying at the Jesuit boarding school of San Estanislao de Kostka, in Miraflores del Palo, Málaga.

=== From 1920 to 1931 (Madrid, Spain) ===
==== Life and cultural context ====
In 1920 Lorenzo Domínguez returned to Spain, where he would stay for the next eleven years. He studied medicine in Madrid for five years. During Primo de Rivera's dictatorship, he frequented two leftist cultural circles ("tertulias"): a scientific and medical group linked to Santiago Ramón y Cajal, winner of the 1906 Nobel Prize for Medicine, and a group of writers and artists associated with the great modernist writer, Ramón del Valle Inclán. Cajal's group included medical professionals like García del Real, professor of pathology; Juan Negrín, a physiologist and socialist politician who would later become the last President of the Government (Prime Minister) of the Second Spanish Republic; and Pío del Río-Hortega, a famous neuro-histologist who left Spain after the Civil War, dying in Buenos Aires in 1945. Valle Inclán's group included writers and artists like Enrique Díez Canedo, poet and literary critic; Ricardo Baroja, painter; José Gutiérrez Solana, painter and writer; occasionally the poet Antonio Machado; Juan de Echeverría, painter; Ignacio Sánchez Mejías, the bullfighter and writer; Juan de la Encina, art critic; and Manuel Azaña, a writer and politician who would later become the last President of the Second Spanish Republic.

==== Work ====
In 1926, while he was still studying medicine, Lorenzo Domínguez realized that his true vocation was sculpting. From 1926 to 1931 he worked at the art workshops of Juan Cristóbal and Emiliano Barral. Important works from this period include two heads in marble, "Cajal" and "Julia"; a stone portrait of Martín Luis Guzmán, the Mexican writer; and a bronze head called "Young Woman with Short Hair". Also, Domínguez carved a stone monument dedicated to Santiago Ramón y Cajal that is placed at the College of Doctors, or "Ilustre Colegio Oficial de Médicos de Madrid" (Santa Isabel, Nº 51, Madrid). A full size cement copy has been placed at the nearby "Instituto de las Administraciones Públicas".

=== From 1931 to 1938 (Santiago de Chile, first period) ===
==== Life and cultural context ====
In 1931, Lorenzo Domínguez returned to Santiago de Chile and began teaching sculpture at the Escuela de Bellas Artes de Santiago. He befriended other plastic artists like the painters Hernán Gazmuri, Abelardo Bustamante, Inés Puyó and María Tupper, as well as painters from the Montparnasse Group (Camilo Mori, Pablo Burchard, Augusto Eguiluz and Anita Cortés); sculptors like Samuel Román Rojas, Totila Albert and Laura Rodig; poets like Pablo Neruda, winner of the 1971 Nobel Prize for Literature, Vicente Huidobro, the vanguardist author responsible for "creacionismo", and Nicanor Parra; writers like the novelists Marta Brunet, Augusto d'Halmar, Manuel Rojas and Mariano Latorre; musicians like Claudio Arrau, Acario Cotapos, Víctor Tevah and Rosita Renard; and scientists like professor Alejandro Lipschutz. His students included Lily Garáfulic, Marta Colvin, María Bellet and María Fuentealba.

==== Work ====
Between 1931 and 1938 Lorenzo Domínguez completed three public monuments. The first, a bronze sculpture, was dedicated "To Jaime Pinto Riesco", a young medicine student killed by the police on July 24, 1931, during a demonstration against Carlos Ibáñez's dictatorship (1927–1931); the second one, a large stone head "To Johann Sebastian Bach", is placed at the Parque Forestal, in Santiago; the third one is a stone monument placed at the Department of Dentistry at the Universidad de Chile, dedicated "To Dr. Germán Valenzuela Basterrica", the founder of Chile's Dental School. Other sculptures from this period are "Nieves", a portrait of Nieves Yáncovic; "Nana" and "Saint Olalla" in Carrara marble; a stone portrait of the writer "Augusto d'Halmar"; a beautiful bronze portrait of "Elisa Bindhoff", André Breton's wife; a bronze portrait of "The Painter Pablo Burchard" and a bronze "Portrait of the Painter Hernán Gazmuri", that is now at the Museo Nacional de Bellas Artes de Santiago. There are other bronzes from this period: "Archbishop Errázuriz", "Elena Bezanilla", "Eliana", "Olga", "Graciela", "Magdalena" and a mask of "Professor Lipschutz". "Lilión", a female head in green marble from Florence, is one of his masterpieces. A bronze of "Lilión", is at the Museo Nacional de Bellas Artes de Santiago.

=== From 1938 to 1939 (Spain, France and England) ===
In 1938 Lorenzo Domínguez returned to Europe. He stayed a few months in Barcelona, assisting Republican groups that saved artistic treasures endangered by the civil war. Afterwards, he traveled to London and Paris, where he was impressed by Picasso's exhibition at Paul Rosenberg's gallery. Domínguez stayed in Paris for almost a year frequenting the art workshops of Bourdelle, Brâncuși and Maillol. He considered Bourdelle, who had died in 1929, a genius. He unconditionally admired Maillol as a sculptor, but not as much as a drawer. He also admired Brâncuși, although at times he thought the surfaces of some of Brâncuși's sculptures were far too shiny and far too polished.

=== From 1939 to 1941 (Santiago de Chile, second period) ===
In 1939 Lorenzo Domínguez returned to Santiago de Chile and continued teaching sculpture at the Escuela de Bellas Artes. From June to September, 1939, three of his sculptures were exhibited at the New York Riverside Museum, in the Latin American Exhibition of Fine and Applied Art ("Lilión", "Saint Olalla" and "Cajal"). Between 1939 and 1941 Lorenzo Domínguez completed the monument "To Dr. Luis Calvo Mackenna", a Chilean pediatrician. This maternity scene in black basalt is located in the Parque Balmaceda of Santiago. He also completed an important black basalt sculpture, "Portrait of the Moon", the first of his "Planetarium series"; and a stone portrait of the "Painter Augusto Eguiluz". Domínguez's masterpiece from this period is "Victor Delhez", a portrait of the Belgian engraver, carved in Carrara marble.

=== From 1941 to 1949 (Mendoza, Argentina, first period) ===
==== Life and cultural context ====
In 1941 Lorenzo Domínguez moved to Mendoza, Argentina, to teach sculpture at the recently founded Universidad Nacional de Cuyo. In Mendoza, he married Clara Digiovanni, a professor of English at the same university. They had three children: Federica, Lorenzo and Fernán.

Mendoza, and especially the new university, had a vibrant cultural atmosphere. During his time in Mendoza (1941–1949; 1956–1959; 1961–1963), Lorenzo Domínguez re-encountered Victor Delhez, whom he had met in Santiago de Chile, and befriended other artists: painters like Francisco Bernareggi, Ramón Gómez Cornet, Roberto Azzoni, Rosalía Flichman, Roberto Cascarini, Fidel de Lucia, José Manuel Gil, Enrique Sobisch and Rosa Arturo; the draughtsmen Fivaller Subirats and Mario Marziali; the humorist and cartoonist Joaquín Lavado or "Quino"; engravers like Sergio Hocevar (or Sergio Sergi) and Heriberto Hualpa; poets and writers, like Reinaldo Bianchini, Alberto Cirigliano, Alberto Dáneo, Daniel Devoto, Jorge Enrique Ramponi, Guillermo Kaúl, Américo Calí, Ricardo Tudela, Antonio Di Benedetto, Julio Cortázar, Abelardo Vázquez, Juan Villaverde, Iverna Codina, Angélica Mendoza, Fernando Lorenzo, Víctor Hugo Cúneo, Armando Tejada Gómez, Rodolfo Braceli and Hugo Acevedo; the historian Claudio Sánchez Albornoz; the writer and philosophy professor Diego F. Pró, who would later become his biographer; Ernesto and Joan Coromines, who were respectively mathematician and philologist; Edmundo Correas, first rector of the Universidad Nacional de Cuyo; professors of literature like Adolfo Ruiz Díaz, Alfredo Roggiano, Emilia Puceiro and Delia Villalobos; other professors like Matilde Zuloaga, Enrique Zuleta Álvarez, Lorenzo Mascialino and Manlio Lugaresi; the mathematician Manuel Balanzat; the medical doctors Fernando Mas Robles, Francisco Correas, Francisco Amengual, Mario Burgos and Rodolfo Muratorio Posse; several musicians, like the pianist Antonio De Raco, the composer Isidro Maiztegui, the composer and singer of folk songs Jaime Dávalos, the organist and composer Julio Perceval, Juan Salomone, Amicarelli, Julio Malaval, the pianist Estela López Lubary and the singers Mary Lan and Mercedes Sosa; the actress and theater director Galina Tolmacheva and the actress Niní Gambier; the folklorist and narrator Juan Draghi Lucero; the journalist Miguel Gómez Echea; the editor Gildo D'Accurzio; the photographer Antonio D'Elia; the lawyer Juan Carlos Silva; and the architects Daniel Ramos Correas, Samuel Sánchez de Bustamante, and Arturo and Manolo Civit.

Among his students, four young artists worked with him for an extended period: Beatriz Capra, Mariano Pagés, José Carrieri and Carlos de la Mota. Other students included: Luis Quesada, Carlos Alonso, Orlando Pardo, Leonor Rigau, Miguel Ángel Sugo, Marcelo Santángelo, Irene Pepa, Elio Mirrado, Alberto Moscatelli and José Bermúdez.

Periodically, Lorenzo Domínguez traveled to Buenos Aires. There, his friends were sculptors like Líbero Badii, Antonio Sibellino, Alfredo Bigatti, José Fioravanti, Horacio Juárez, Noemí Gerstein and Lea Lublin; painters like Emilio Pettoruti, Héctor Basaldúa, Benito Quinquela Martín, Lucio Fontana, Raquel Forner, Luis Seoane, Alfredo Guido, Ernesto Farina and Mariette Lydis; ceramists like Fernando Arranz and Tove Johansen; art critics like Jorge Romero Brest, Córdova Iturburu, Julio Payró, Roger Plá, José Luis Pagano, Lorenzo Varela, Miguel de los Santos and Romualdo Brughetti; photographers like Horacio Coppola, Grete Stern and Anatole Saderman; poets and writers like the Spanish poet Rafael Alberti and his wife, the novelist María Teresa León, the Guatemalan novelist Miguel Ángel Asturias, Nobel Prize in literature in 1967, the vanguardist authors Oliverio Girondo and Eduardo González Lanuza, and other writers and poets like Manuel Mujica Láinez, Mario Binetti and Victoria Ocampo; actors and theater people like Margarita Xirgu, Delia Garcés, Pedro López Lagar or the scenographer Gori Muñoz; the editor Gonzalo Losada; and art collectors like Víctor Bossart and Federico Vogelius.

==== Work ====
During his first period in Mendoza, from 1941 to 1949, Lorenzo Domínguez created some of his main sculptural works. He completed seven public monuments. Two of them are dedicated "To Pasteur": the first one at the Institute of Bacteriology in Santiago de Chile, and the other one at the Lagomaggiore Hospital for Infectious Diseases in Mendoza. Two monuments were dedicated "To Leandro N. Alem", a famous Argentine politician of democratic and anti-authoritarian ideas that in 1891 founded what is considered Argentina's oldest political party, the Radical Civic Union. Both monuments are in Mendoza: one at a park (Parque del Este), the other one at a school (Leandro N. Alem). Lorenzo Domínguez also completed a stone monument dedicated to "To Dr. Anacleto Gil", a 19th. century governor of the Argentine province of San Juan. It is located in Parque de Mayo, a park in the city of San Juan. The most important monument completed during this period is "To San Martín and O'Higgins", dedicated to José de San Martín and Bernardo O'Higgins, two crucial historical figures who led Argentina and Chile in their wars of independence from colonial Spain. The monument, placed at the central "Chile" square in Mendoza, is a tribute to the friendship between both countries. It portrays two stone figures 3.50 m. high, standing over a massive stone base and grasping a common sword. Another monument from this period is the "Christ of the Resurrection". Located at the campus of the Universidad Nacional de Cuyo, this bronze figure reaches 2.40 m. both in arm span and in height and is a posthumous cast from the original 1947 plaster.

Between 1941 and 1949 the artist added five stone carvings to the "Planetarium series" that he had started in Santiago with "Portrait of the Moon": "The Planet Venus", "The Planet Saturn", "The Milky Way", "Berenice" and "The Morning Star". He also carved "Cuyanita", the head of a young girl from the Argentine region of Cuyo, in Carrara marble; "Little Red Nude", in red stone; and "Miguel Servet", also in red stone, a study for a monument to the Spanish philosopher and scientist who, after discovering and describing the circulation of blood in the 16th. century, was condemned by both Catholics and Protestants and burnt alive at the stake as a heretic. During his first period in Mendoza, Lorenzo Domínguez completed several new portraits in stone: two portraits of his wife, "Clara" and "Clara Federica"; "Francisco Bernareggi"; "Beatriz Capra"; "Ramón Gómez Cornet", placed at the Museo Provincial de Bellas Artes in Santiago del Estero, Argentina; "Sergio Sergi", in black granite and one of the artist's masterpieces; "Marjorie", in Carrara marble; "Federica", a first portrait of his daughter; "La Pilo", Ramón Gómez Cornet's daughter; "Zezette Dáneo", placed at the Art Department of the Universidad Nacional de Cuyo; "Paco Correas", Dr. Francisco Correas' son; "The Poet Ramponi"; "Hipólito Digiovanni", his father in-law; and "Francisco Amengual" and his wife "Dorita Zabalza de Amengual". "Llaima-Llaima", a female bust in golden stone, excels among the works completed between 1941 and 1949 and is one of his masterpieces. There are also two large half figures: "María Ticac" in yellow stone and "Ana Villar de Domínguez", a portrait of his mother.

Besides these works in stone, Lorenzo Domínguez completed sculptures in other materials. He made several portraits in plaster: "Dr. Fernando Mas Robles", the Spanish physician who was his lifetime friend; "Estelita Civit", wife of Manolo Civit, an architect from Mendoza; "Argentina Gómez Cornet", the great painter's wife; and "Irma", a portrait of Irma Aragonés, one of his wife Clara's friends. Also in plaster are "Sarmiento", and "Young Infanta from Mendoza", a project for a monument to San Martín's daughter that represents a mother-daughter group. An important work in plaster is "The Married Woman", a large-sized female figure that the artist made in Mendoza and then took with him when he moved to Tucumán in 1949. During his first period in Mendoza, Lorenzo Domínguez completed a "Christ" in colored, gold-plated wood. He made several works in ceramics, including "Barcelona" (1941), a 64 cm. sculpture that portrays a mother holding her child and looking upwards towards a menacing sky that we can imagine full of airplanes and bombs. This sculpture, as well as some drawings with the same theme that the author made during his second period in Mendoza, is a powerful denunciation of Nazi air raids during the Spanish Civil War and a symbol of the sufferings inflicted by war.

Between 1941 and 1949 the artist began two series of drawings: the "Portraits Series", started with "Clara Federica", a portrait of his wife, and the "Religious Themes Series". Domínguez was not a practicing Catholic, but he had a sense of the sacred, and a profound knowledge of the Old and New Testaments and of later Christian history. Between 1941 and 1949 the artist completed "The Prophet Jonas", "The Virgin of Hope", "Judith" and "Saint Joan". He also made drawings on assorted themes like "Pegasus", "Aristotle" and three drawings of strong erotic connotations entitled "Metropolitan Venus".

=== From 1949 to 1956 (Tucumán, Argentina) ===
==== Life and cultural context ====
In 1949 Lorenzo Domínguez moved from Mendoza to Tucumán to work as a professor of sculpture at the Universidad Nacional de Tucumán.

At the time, the city of Tucumán had become an artistic center, hosting painters like Lino Enea Spilimbergo, Ramón Gómez Cornet, Luis Lobo de la Vega, Timoteo Navarro, José Nieto Palacios, Francisco Ramoneda and Medardo Pantoja; engravers like Pompeyo Audivert and Víctor Rebuffo; draughtsmen like Lajos Szalay and Eugenio Hirsch; and a group of jewelers and metal workers headed by Pedro Zurro de la Fuente. Horacio Descole was the rector of the University, and Guido Parpagnoli the dean of the Instituto Superior de Artes. Lorenzo Domínguez's circle of colleagues and friends included the writers Enrique Anderson Imbert and Pablo Rojas Paz; the architects Eduardo Sacriste, Hilario Zalba, Jorge Vivanco, Horacio Caminos, Eithel Federico Traine, Federico Lerena and Enrico Tedeschi; the biology and medicine researchers Cecilio Romagna, Giuseppe Cei and Juan Carlos Fasciolo; the psychiatrist Juan Dalma; the priest Petit de Murat; the orchestra director Carlos Félix Cillario and, whenever he had a concert, the harpist Nicanor Zabaleta.

Occasionally, during his Tucumán period, Domínguez traveled to Resistencia, Chaco, where he met Aldo and Efraín Boglietti and Hilda Torres Varela who, along with other intellectuals, had organized a cultural center and a residence for artists, the "Fogón de los Arrieros".

==== Work ====
In Tucumán the artist made three monuments for the Miguel Lillo Biology Institute, at the Universidad Nacional de Tucumán. Among them, "To Dr. Miguel Lillo", or "Flora" and "Fauna", is the most important with its two standing female nudes in stone, almost three meters high. One of the figures carries flower garlands on her head and hands, while the other holds a puma cub in her arms. The second monument, also in stone, is dedicated to "Professor Schreiter", a German ethnographer and naturalist that worked with Dr. Miguel Lillo. The third monument is an owl of wisdom, a large figure in cement that is part of the colorful "Fountain of Science".

From 1949 to 1956, Domínguez created some important sculptures in stone: "Black Boxer" in blue stone; "Leonor", a portrait of the artist Leonor Rigau in black granite; "La Señorita"; "María Coya"; "María Rosa"; "Federica", a second portrait of his daughter; and "Time Hieroglyph", a large relief in red stone. Four works excel among the stone and marble sculptures of this period: "Portrait of my wife", a third portrait of his wife Clara, characterized for its slightly asymmetrical features that suggest the "soft" and "hard" sides of her personality; "Guido Parpagnoli", a monumental head in red stone; "Death", in black basalt; and especially "The Unknown Political Prisoner", a tragic figure carved in red stone, portraying a skull with two hands that cover its eye sockets.

Besides these works in stone, Lorenzo Domínguez completed sculptures in other materials: a bronze portrait of "The Painter Lino Enea Spilimbergo"; two works in ceramics, "The Virgin of Hope", a seated female figure, and "The Little Mother", a playful maternity that depicts a little girl hugging her doll; several portraits in plaster, "Ana Villar de Domínguez", a new portrait of his mother; "Pompeyo Audivert", the engraver; "Argentina Gómez Cornet", the painter's wife; and "Horacio Descole", the rector of the Universidad Nacional de Tucumán. "The Argentine Antarctic" is a symbolic work in plaster that portrays a powerful female figure wearing boots and heavy leather clothes, with a sea lion by her side. "Manuel de Falla" is a musical angel also in plaster, a project for a monument to the musician that is located at the Museo Manuel de Falla, in Alta Gracia, Córdoba, Argentina. "Peace Dove", a small work in plaster, portrays a fallen dove that symbolizes the failure of the peace ideal.

In Tucumán, Lorenzo Domínguez developed and mastered his technique for embossing large iron or copper plates. On this media, the prevalent themes are: figures from the Old and New Testaments, Latin American figures of pre-Columbian style, figures from classical European myths, and above all the subject of Don Quixote. Some important embossed metal plates from this period are: "Adam and Eve", "The Prophet Jonas", "Judith and Holofernes", "Christ", "Saint John the Baptist", "Visitation", "Fight between Pachamama and War", "The Abduction of Europa", "Don Miguel de Unamuno" and two very large plates, "Portrait of the Sun" and "Our Lord Don Quixote". There are also eight iron plates that belong to the series of Don Quixote's "falls": "Strangling of the Hand", "Crucifixion in Madness", "Crucifixion in Health", "Encounter with Insanity", "The Invisible Wall", "Censorship", "The Creative Hand" and "The Spoliation".

From 1949 to 1956, Lorenzo Domínguez worked on some of his most important drawings. He did a brief series of four drawings about the subject of maternity. He continued with the "Religious Themes Series" ("Crucifixion", "Christ", and "The Four Horsemen of Apocalypse") and with the series of the "Portraits", both of which he had started in Mendoza. Within this last series he did several family portraits: "Clara", "Ana Villar", two portraits of his daughter Federica, two portraits of his son Fernán, a portrait entitled "Lorenzo" and another one entitled "Little Boy". There is also a portrait of his friend, the painter "Spilimbergo"; and a portrait of an anonymous young woman entitled "Young Girl from Tucumán". An enigmatic drawing of this period is "Self Esteem".

In Tucumán, the artist began two new series of drawings: the "Mythology of Chile" with two drawings entitled "Valparaíso", and the "Series of the Stones" with a drawing called "Reclining Woman".

He also began three of his four series of nudes: "Standing Nudes", "Seated Nudes" and "Reclining Nudes". Domínguez drew only female nudes, and they vary from the realistic to the stylized. His nudes amount for a large percent of the total of the artist's drawings (200/500).

Between 1954 and 1955 Lorenzo Domínguez started and completed the series of drawings he called "Via Crucis of Don Quixote". These drawings on the subject of Don Quixote's falls are an aesthetic transposition of twenty four physical and symbolic falls suffered by Miguel de Cervantes' literary hero. The series consists of thirty-two drawings, with different versions and studies for some of the falls. Lorenzo Domínguez was always attracted by this Spanish novel, both as reading matter and subject of meditation, and as an aesthetic paradigm. In the figure of the knight-errant, the artist finds everlasting symbols. His twenty-four physical falls (perhaps twenty-four spiritual triumphs) are varied in nature. Some are caused by cruelty or vulgarity: in "Encounter with Servility" Don Quixote finds some merchants and is beaten by a mule keeper; in "Encounter with Brutality" he is beaten by a goat shepherd; "Sadism" refers to a passage in the novel when the dukes, as a cruel joke, free a bag full of angry cats, and the animals attack and injure Don Quixote; in "Strangling of the Hand" Maritornes mocks him and lets him hang from a window for an entire night; and in "The Abuse of Genius", Don Quixote is run over by a herd of swine. There are falls due to ingratitude, like "The Spoliation", where Don Quixote, after freeing the galley prisoners, is robbed by them; or "Sancho's Betrayal", where he is beaten by Sancho Panza; or "Encounter with Friendship", where Don Quixote is knocked down by his friend Bachelor Sansón Carrasco in disguise as the Knight of the White Moon. In "Encounter with Lust", a muleteer in love with Maritornes hits Don Quixote, causing him to fall. Sometimes it is fantasy itself that falls through, pulling Don Quixote along; and thus, there is a "First Shipwreck of Fantasy", a depiction of the hero's catastrophic trip in the enchanted ship; and a "Second Shipwreck of Fantasy", about another catastrophic trip on a flying horse. There are falls caused by madness: by poetic madness in "Crucifixion in Madness", where Don Quixote appears on the cross of the allegorical windmill; and by the pathological madness of Cardenio in "Encounter with Insanity". For today's observer this Via Crucis offers some interesting and polemic falls, like "Censorship", where Don Quixote is forced by some of his most prominent neighbors -the priest and the barber- to return to his village, muzzled and in a cage; or like "Encounter with Power", where Don Quixote falls from his horse, overwhelmed at the sight of the powerful aristocratic figures of the Duke and his wife. Falls of definite political nature are "The Civil War", and "Horror of the Future". In the first drawing, Spain fights against Spain, and Don Quixote, a symbol of Spain, is attacked and run over by a herd of bulls, another symbol of Spain. In the second drawing, there is a deliberate anachronism: Don Quixote falls at the doors of Barcelona, as if hit by a premonition of the Spanish Civil War. In the drawing, Lorenzo Domínguez's sculpture "Barcelona" appears as homage to the victims of bombings. In the last fall, "Crucifixion in Health", the religious dimension of Don Quixote, already suggested in "Crucifixion in Madness", becomes clearer. In this final fall, the Spanish knight stops being Don Quixote. In this drawing, Cervantes' character appears at the center, and to his right and left appear the housekeeper and the niece, mimicking the female figures of the Christian crucifixion. Upon breaking the spear, the knight's arms become the arms of a cross. Don Quixote dies on that cross, and only Alonso Quijano is left behind. Lorenzo Domínguez intended to use the drawings of the "Via Crucis of Don Quixote" to illustrate a special edition of Cervantes' novel, a project that he never abandoned, not even during his stay in Easter Island. Between 1949 and 1956, some of the drawings about Don Quixote's falls developed into large embossed metal plates.

=== From 1956 to 1959 (Mendoza, Argentina, second period) ===
==== Life and cultural context ====
In 1956 Lorenzo Domínguez left Tucumán and returned to the Escuela Superior de Artes Plásticas of the Universidad Nacional de Cuyo in Mendoza. After the artist's arrival in 1956 some of his old disciples returned to his workshop, and new ones arrived: Carmen Gracia, Mónica Wasmuth, Claudia Zanettini, Chipo Céspedes, Juan Antonio García, Teresa Larrañaga Domínguez, Matías Vial, and Eliana Molinelli.

==== Work ====
Lorenzo Domínguez completed two important sculptures between 1956 and 1959: a monument dedicated to "Plato", placed at the Department of Philosophy and Letters of the Universidad Nacional de Cuyo, and a "Torso" in black granite.

He also completed several embossed metal plates: "Saint Barbara", "The Mountains", "The Pregnant Woman" and "The Visit", a large iron plate on the theme of the visitation of the Virgin Mary to Saint Elizabeth symbolizing hospitality.

During this period the artist concentrated on his drawings. He continued with his first three series of nudes, the "Standing", "Seated" and "Reclining Nudes", and he started the new "Two Nudes Series". He made several portraits, including "Gloria", "Checkered Woman", an anonymous "Portrait", and another "Portrait" of a woman with half closed eyes. The artist continued with the religious themes: "Santa Barbara", "Christ and Saint John", "Veronica", "Virgin", "The Unrepentant Thief" "Sanctity", "The Visit", and one of his masterpieces, "Jude's Kiss". The artist completed his series on the "Mythology of Chile", with some drawings inspired by pre-Columbian figures and by the wound left by the Spanish conquest, like his three drawings about the Araucanian woman ("Araucanian Venus") and his drawings about the torture and martyrdom of the native chief ("cacique") Caupolicán. There are also eight drawings about the Chilean poet, Gabriela Mistral, Nobel Prize in literature in 1945. In this subseries of drawings, the poet's figure is represented with different levels of abstraction and detail, thus helping us to understand some of the artist's aesthetic processes. Domínguez completed another series that, at a later time, was called "Drawings Anticipating Easter Island", and he finished the series that he called "Stones". This series consists of fifteen drawings depicting monumental or monster-like figures that seem spurting from the rock: the second drawing in the series, "Stone", represents the head of an animal with prominent fangs; another one, "Johann Sebastian Bach", evokes the monument in stone that the artist had completed in Chile; three drawings called "The Milky Way", evoke the artist's sculpture from the "planetarium series"; and four drawings represent the figures of Christ and the devil as blocks of stone. Among the "Assorted Themes Series", there are some magnificent subseries on the bombing of "Barcelona" during the Spanish Civil War; the "Childbirth" theme; and "The Death of the Rabbit", that depicts the killing of rabbits by peasants. Other drawings of this last series are: "Condors", "Angel", "Kiss of Black and White", "Plato", and the extraordinary "Smiling Woman".

=== From January 1960 to February 1961 (Easter Island, Chile) ===
==== Life and cultural context ====
For thirteen months from January 1960 until February 1961, thanks to a grant from Fondo Nacional de las Artes (Secretaría de Cultura, Argentine Government), Lorenzo Domínguez fulfilled his lifetime dream of living and working among the moais and petroglyphs of Easter Island.

This Chilean Island, also called Rapa Nui, is one of the most isolated places on earth, since it is in the Southeastern Pacific Ocean, 2000 miles from continental Chile and Tahiti which are the nearest population centers. In 1960 travel to the Island was very difficult as airtravel had not yet been established between Easter Island and continental Chile. The only regular communication was a Chilean Navy transport ship which visited the Island in January, and only remained there for ten or fifteen days, so travelers who did not return with the ship had to stay in the Island for the whole year.

On January 11, 1960, Lorenzo Domínguez left the Chilean port of Valparaíso towards Easter Island, arriving on January 18, and staying until February 1, 1961. During these thirteen months he created sculptures and drawings, wrote a personal and artistic journal, and photographed the sculptures and petroglyphs of the Island.

His returning trip would be an adventure in itself, since he took an unexpected opportunity to fly back to Chile. With his return ship already anchored at the Island and ready to go back to the continent, a plane arrived. The pilot was Roberto Parragué, a Chilean Capitán de Bandada, who was performing his third adventurous flight between Valparaíso and Easter Island in an old Flying boat, the Manutara II. Parragué let Lorenzo Domínguez book a seat in his plane, and Domínguez thus became one of the first two commercial passengers to fly from Easter Island to Chile.

==== Work ====
During the year he lived in Easter Island, Lorenzo Domínguez made one large sculpture, a portrait of Father Sebastian Englert, the priest, linguist and ethnographer who lived on Easter Island from 1935 until his death in 1969. Lorenzo Domínguez completed Englert's head in plaster in the Island, and carved it in wood in Mendoza after his return. He also carved some small reliefs on Easter Island stones.

Between January 1960 and February 1961, Lorenzo Domínguez completed 128 large drawings inspired by the moais and petroglyphs of the Island, as well as sketches that he would afterwards develop into finished drawings or into large embossed metal plates. These works are all described and photographed in the 1998 General Catalog. There are nine series of drawings from the Island: the "Series of the Moais" (29 drawings inspired by the Moai (gigantic stone sculptures of the Island)); the "Series of the Make-Makes" (32 drawings inspired by Petroglyphs of Make Make a god with big eyes who is frequently represented in Rapa Nui petroglyphs); the "Series of the Bird-Men" (17 drawings about some mythological beings, half man and half bird that symbolize the Tangata Manu - victor hero of a competition for power and for a legendary egg); the "Series of the Moai Hands" (10 drawings); the "Series of the Komaris" (7 drawings about the komari or vulva another frequent topic for Rapa Nui petroglyphs); the "Series of the Birds" (5 drawings that have the central motif of two birds facing each other with their beaks touching, thus suggesting the second title for the drawings: "The Kiss"); the "Series of the Flying Bird" (5 drawings inspired in a particular stone relief from Anakena that Lorenzo Domínguez considered the supreme masterpiece among the Island's petroglyphs: a bird, or bird-man, whose stylization was for Domínguez "a stroke of genius"); the "Marine Series" (5 drawings on a particular type of petroglyphs, engraved on the ground and depicting some sea creatures); and the "Series of the Easter Island Stones" (5 drawings of stones of remarkable shapes, including some that suggest a skull or the idea of death). He also made 12 drawings from two other series that he would complete later: the first three drawings of the "Series of the Easter Island Torsos", a series with a total of six female torsos; and the first nine drawings of the "Series of Assorted Easter Island Themes", a series of twelve drawings of miscellaneous subjects: a ship followed by a bird that could represent the devil; a face covered by a hand and drawn with reddish soil from the Island; groups of apes or ape-men, with references to the idea of sexual potency; and the subject of flowers and fecundation.

From this period, there is a drawing representing “Christ” that, at least at surface level, sets itself apart from the thematic universe of Easter Island. In the 1998 General Catalog it has been included as part of the "Religious Themes Series" (REL30).

=== From 1961 to 1963 (Mendoza, Argentina, third period) ===
==== Life ====
On February 2, 1961, Lorenzo Domínguez landed at Santiago de Chile. A few days afterwards he returned to Mendoza, to his wife, his two sons and daughter and his mother, as well as to his workshop in Montevideo Street, the old building where he taught his classes to the art students of the Universidad Nacional de Cuyo. He lived only two more years, and on March 21, 1963, he died in the arms of his wife, after suffering a heart attack.

This last period of his life, saddened only by the death of his mother Ana, brought serene and happy years with his family, friends and students. It was also a fruitful period from an artistic point of view. He had much public recognition. There were interviews, conferences and exhibitions, particularly a large one organized in Buenos Aires at the National Museum of Fine Arts, or Museo Nacional de Bellas Artes, that included drawings, embossed metal plates and enlargements of some of the photographs he had taken in Easter Island. He also wrote several chapters of his book Las esculturas de la Isla de Pascua.

==== Work ====
Between 1961 and 1963 Lorenzo Domínguez completed a large sculpture in red stone, "Peace", representing an angel breaking a sword; and he carved two wood heads of Easter Island inspiration: "Young Girl from Easter Island" and "Father Sebastian Englert".

He completed eight large embossed iron and copper plates on Easter Island subjects, all of which can be considered masterpieces: "Ship Chased by an Aku-Aku", or demon; "Hieroglyph from Hanga-Papara", on the subject of fecundation; "Komaris", or vulvas; "Make-Make of the Storm"; the stylized "Flying Bird"; a copper plate entitled "The Birds, or The Kiss"; "The Shipwrecked", that depicts anthropomorphic oars representing shipwreck and death; and "Easter Island Torso", a copper plate depicting a powerful female torso. In 1961 the artist finished an embossed copper plate, "Breakfast is Ready", on the subject of painful servitude: mother and child are carrying a tray, lacerated by the nails and crown of thorns typical of Christian crucifixion.

During this period Lorenzo Domínguez performed drawings that can also be considered masterpieces and show the influence of the aesthetic experience he had just lived in Easter Island. He completed three drawings on the "Shipwreck" subseries (Series of Assorted Easter Island Themes) and three "Easter Island Torsos"; as well as two drawings with the subject of "Christ" that are related to the "Christ" drawn during his stay in Easter Island. He made a drawing about "Valle Inclán", the Spanish writer that he had met in his youth; and three about "Don Quixote", in two of which Don Quixote is identified with Christ, creating an aesthetic synthesis of two figures that are a symbolic constant along Domínguez's artistic biography. In these two drawings, Don Quixote appears with a crown of thorns or a halo, and with his hand raised in the act of blessing. Both drawings are called "I Know Who I Am", in reference to some intriguing words pronounced by Don Quixote in chapter V of the first part of Cervantes' novel. Other drawings of this period with religious connotations are: "Saint Gemma", "Saint with Cross", and two representations of the "Virgin of Luján", conceived as the starting point for an embossed iron or a tombstone to be placed at the gravesite of the artist's mother. There is also an enigmatic drawing that has vague hagiographic echoes, entitled "The Blind Woman from Palmira", Palmira being a small city near Mendoza. During this period from February 1961 to the moment of his death, Domínguez worked on three series of nudes: "Seated Nudes", "Reclining Nudes" and "Two Nudes". He worked in a subseries of portraits entitled "Young Girl from Mendoza" and in a drawing entitled "Woman from Mendoza". A curious drawing of this period is "The Madly in Love Melon Vendor", a love message addressed to his wife Clara.

== Writings: his book on Easter Island and his Easter Island journals ==
1. Lorenzo Domínguez left a book on Easter Island's sculptures: Domínguez, Lorenzo. Las esculturas de la Isla de Pascua, Prólogo y complementación de la obra por Clara D. de Domíguez, Estudio preliminar, nómina de sus obras y bibliografía por Diego F. Pró, Buenos Aires: Fondo Nacional de las Artes, 1968. Lorenzo Domínguez's death interrupted the preparation and edition of this book. It was completed afterwards by his wife Clara Digiovanni de Domínguez. His biographer, Diego F. Pró wrote the preliminary study as well as the extensive bibliography that includes articles published in magazines, newspapers and periodicals, catalogs of different exhibitions, and a list of unpublished articles and conferences about Lorenzo Domínguez. The book also includes photographs taken by Lorenzo Domínguez of his own drawings and embossed metal plates on Easter Island themes, and some of his photographs of the Island's moais and petroglyphs.

2. Lorenzo Domínguez also left a diary about his stay in Easter Island, a journal of both personal and artistic inspiration written in the form of letters to his wife Clara (Lorenzo Dominguez. Diario de la Isla de Pascua, Cuadernos 1960-1961). The journal begins with the artist's words of salute to Clara while the ship "Presidente Pinto" leaves towards the Island on January 11 of 1960. Along three hundred pages Domínguez registers his aesthetic reflections and his personal emotions upon contemplating the Island's moais and petroglyphs; he speaks about the urgent need to preserve this artistic patrimony; he tells his wife about his own creative process, and gives details about what he is sculpting and drawing and about the photographs that he is taking. But the artist also writes about his everyday life in the Island, about the people he meets, about what he eats or reads, about his travels on horse back accompanied by his guide, Santiago Pakarati, and about his personal feelings of longing and love for his wife and family. The diary ends on February 7 of 1961.

== Photographs: the Easter Island Domínguez Collection (University of California, Los Angeles) ==
Lorenzo Domínguez left a photographic testimony of the Island's artistic patrimony, since he took several hundreds of black-and-white or color photographs, before and after the tsunami that in May 1960 damaged part of the Island's heritage. Today, many of these photographs are part of the database of the UCLA Easter Island Statue Project, directed by Dr. Jo Anne Van Tilburg.

== Works in museums ==
1. Cajal, Madrid, Spain. Bronze head (original plaster: 1929; bronze casting: 1934). Museo Nacional de Bellas Artes, Buenos Aires, Argentina, Cf. BR2 in the 1998 General Catalog.
2. Lilión, Santiago, Chile, 1937. Bronze head, 35 cm. Museo Nacional de Bellas Artes, Santiago, Chile, Cf. BR24 in the 1998 General Catalog.
3. Portrait of the Painter Hernán Gazmuri, Santiago, Chile, 1937. Bronze head, 34 cm. Museo Nacional de Bellas Artes, Santiago, Chile, Cf. BR26 in the 1998 General Catalog..
4. Pasteur, Santiago, Chile, 1942. Plaster, 48 cm. Museo Nacional de Bellas Artes, Santiago, Chile, Cf. Y26 in the 1998 General Catalog.
5. Pasteur, Santiago, Chile, 1942. Green stone, 52 cm. Museo Nacional de Bellas Artes, Santiago, Chile, Cf. P22 in the 1998 General Catalog.
6. Beatriz Capra, Mendoza, Argentina. Bronze (original plaster: 1943; bronze casting: 1944). Head. First portrait of the sculptress, 44 cm. Museo Nacional de Bellas Artes, Buenos Aires, Argentina, Cf. BR28 in the 1998 General Catalog.
7. Ramón Gómez Cornet, Mendoza, Argentina, 1948. Head in hazelnut stone, approximately 40 cm. Museo Provincial de Bellas Artes, Santiago del Estero, Argentina, Cf. P55 in the 1998 General Catalog.
8. Manuel de Falla, Study for a Monument, Tucumán, Argentina, 1951. Plaster. Museo Manuel de Falla, Alta Gracia, Córdoba, Argentina, Cf. Y100 in the 1998 General Catalog.
9. Christ, Tucumán, Argentina, approximately 1951. Embossed iron plate, 65 x 50 cm. Museo Nacional de Bellas Artes, Buenos Aires, Argentina, Cf. BR32 in the 1998 General Catalog.
10. Visitation, Tucumán, Argentina, 1954. Embossed copper plate, 65 x 50 cm. Museo Nacional de Bellas Artes, Buenos Aires, Argentina, Cf. PM20 in the 1998 General Catalog.
11. The Abuse of Genius, XXIII Fall, Tucumán, Argentina, 1955. Drawing, approximately 50 x 65 cm. Via Crucis of Don Quixote Series. Museo Emiliano Guiñazú, Mendoza, Argentina, Cf. VCQ32 in the 1998 General Catalog.

== Bibliography ==
=== Main References ===
1. Domínguez Colavita, Federica; Colavita, Alberto; and Digiovanni de Domínguez, Clara . Lorenzo Domínguez, Catálogo General, 1998 / Lorenzo Domínguez General Catalog, 1998, (Includes photographs and descriptions of the artist's works. Spanish/English bilingual edition), © Library of Congress, Federica Domínguez. Published in CD-ROM, Buenos Aires, 1998.

2. Pró, Diego F. Lorenzo Domínguez, Tucumán: Edited by the author, 1952. Life, works, aesthetics. This book includes quotations and comments by the artist, a chronology, index of works, bibliography. With approximately ninety black-and-white photographs, most of them by the artist.

3. Pró, Diego F. Tiempo de piedra: Lorenzo Domínguez, Mendoza: Ediciones D'Accurzio, 1965. Life, works, aesthetics. Conferences. Testimonies on the artist and his work. Listing of his works. Extensive bibliography which includes articles published in magazines, newspapers and periodicals, catalogs from different exhibitions, and a list of unpublished articles and conferences about Lorenzo Domínguez. With approximately ninety black-and-white photographs, most of them by the artist.

4. Romero Brest, Jorge. Lorenzo Domínguez, Buenos Aires: Editorial Poseidón, 1944. Aesthetic analysis of his works. With approximately fifty black-and-white photographs.

5. Noseda, Lydia R.. Lorenzo Domínguez, AMERICAS (OAS Magazine) Washington DC: April, 1971.

=== Selected bibliography by Lorenzo Domínguez ===
1. Domínguez, Lorenzo. Las esculturas de la Isla de Pascua, Prólogo y complementación de la obra por Clara D. de Domíguez, Estudio preliminar, nómina de sus obras y bibliografía por Diego F. Pró, Buenos Aires: Fondo Nacional de las Artes, 1968.

2. Domínguez, Lorenzo. Easter Island Journal 1960-1961. Spanish text available in internet: Diario de la Isla de Pascua, 1960-1961, ed. by Fernán Domínguez, CD-ROM edition 2001. © Lorenzo Domínguez.

3. Domínguez, Lorenzo. Letters to Jorge Romero Brest. (Cartas dirigidas a Jorge Romero Brest.) Ver y estimar ('Look and Consider'), Buenos Aires, 1954.

4. Unpublished texts by Lorenzo Domínguez: a. Domínguez, Lorenzo. Correspondencia. b. Domínguez, Lorenzo. Cuentos de museo. c. Domínguez, Lorenzo. Notas de viajes.

=== Selected art books with references to Lorenzo Domínguez ===
1. Brughetti, Romualdo. "La escultura a principios del siglo XX", en Historia General del Arte en la Argentina, Buenos Aires: Academia Nacional de Bellas Artes, 1994, pp. 189–245. 2. Carvacho, Víctor. Historia de la Escultura en Chile. Santiago de Chile: Andrés Bello, 1983, pp. 214–217. 3. Gesualdo, Vicente. Enciclopedia del arte en América, Buenos Aires: Omeba, 1968. Historia I, pp. 359–360; Biographies I, pp. 359–360. 4. Heilmeyer, Alexander; and Benet, Rafael. La escultura moderna y contemporánea. Barcelona: Labor, 1949, section 4, pp. 340–342. 5. Humeres, Carlos. "A arte contemporãnea no Chile", in Arte chilena contemporãnea. Río de Janeiro, Ministerio de Educação e Saúde, 1944. 6. Ossa Puelma, Nena. Museo Nacional de Bellas Artes. Santiago de Chile: Dirección de Bibliotecas, Archivos y Museos, Ministerio de Educación Pública, 1984, pp. 94–96; 102. 7. Santillán, Diego A. Gran Enciclopedia Argentina. Buenos Aires: Ediar, 1957, vol. III, p. 88). 8. Sullivan, Edward J. (ed.). Latin American art in the twentieth century. London: Phaidon Press, 1996, pp. 303 and 306). 9. Westermann, Silvia. Cincuenta años de escultura contemporánea chilena. Santiago de Chile: Estación Mapocho, 1996, pp. 18–19).

=== Articles in periodicals on Lorenzo Domínguez ===
Both Las esculturas de la Isla de Pascua, and Tiempo de piedra: Lorenzo Domínguez include extensive bibliographies prepared by Diego F. Pró with references to more than eighty articles published in magazines, newspapers and other periodicals. Among them there are articles by Albrecht Goldschmidt, Jorge Romero Brest, Córdova Iturburu, Reinaldo Bianchini, Diego F. Pró, Manuel Gonzalo Casas, Romualdo Brughetti, David Lagmanovich, Roger Plá, Miguel Gómez Echea, Darío Carmona, Antonio Romera, Lorenzo Varela, Juan José Mirabelli, Nélida Cuetos and Adolfo Ruíz Díaz.
