= Marta Colvin =

Chilean sculptor (1907–1995)

- Born: Marta Colvin Andrade; 1907; Chillán, Chile
- Died: 27 October 1995 (aged 87–88); Santiago, Chile
- Education: University of Chile
- Occupation: Sculptor

Marta Colvin Andrade (1907–1995) was a Chilean sculptor.

== Biography ==
Colvin was born in 1907 in Chillán to James Colvin and Elvira Andrade. Her father was of Irish descent and her mother of Portuguese descent. After the 1939 Chillán earthquake, she lived in Santiago, Chile, and studied at the School of Arts. In 1943 she was appointed assistant professor from the sculpture workshop of Julio A. Vasquez and master Lorenzo Domínguez and was officially appointed Professor in 1950. In 1948 she attended the Grande Chaumiere Academie in Paris with masters Ossian Zadkine and Henry Laurens. She went on to live in France for more than thirty years. In 1965 she took part in the first Sao Paulo Biennale. She was known worldwide and awarded the National Art Prize in 1970 in recognition of her works.

She died in Santiago on 27 October 1995.

== Sculpture in museum collections ==
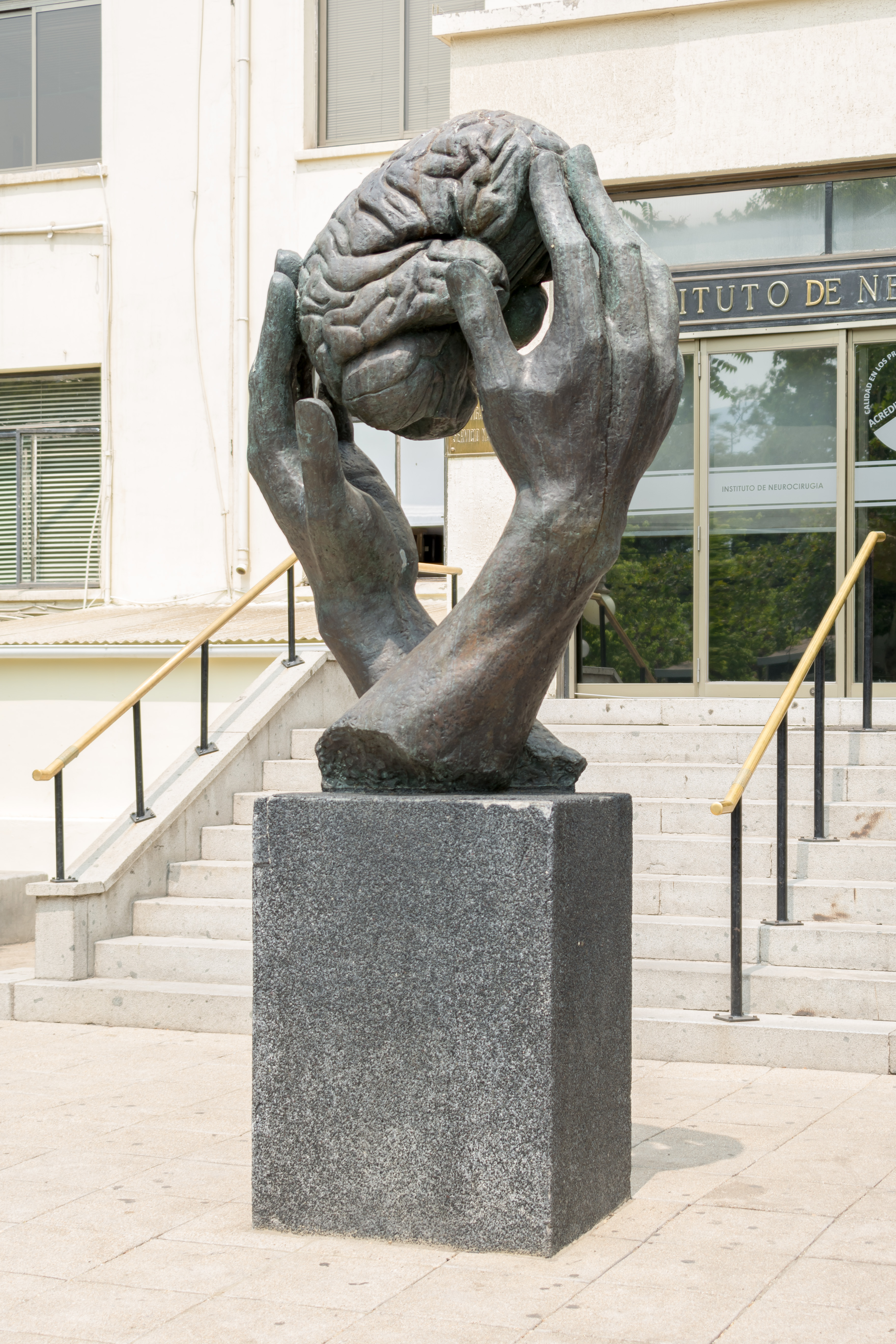
Homenaje a la Neurocirugía, sculpture by Marta Colvin. Instituto de Neurocirugía, Providencia, Santiago, Chile

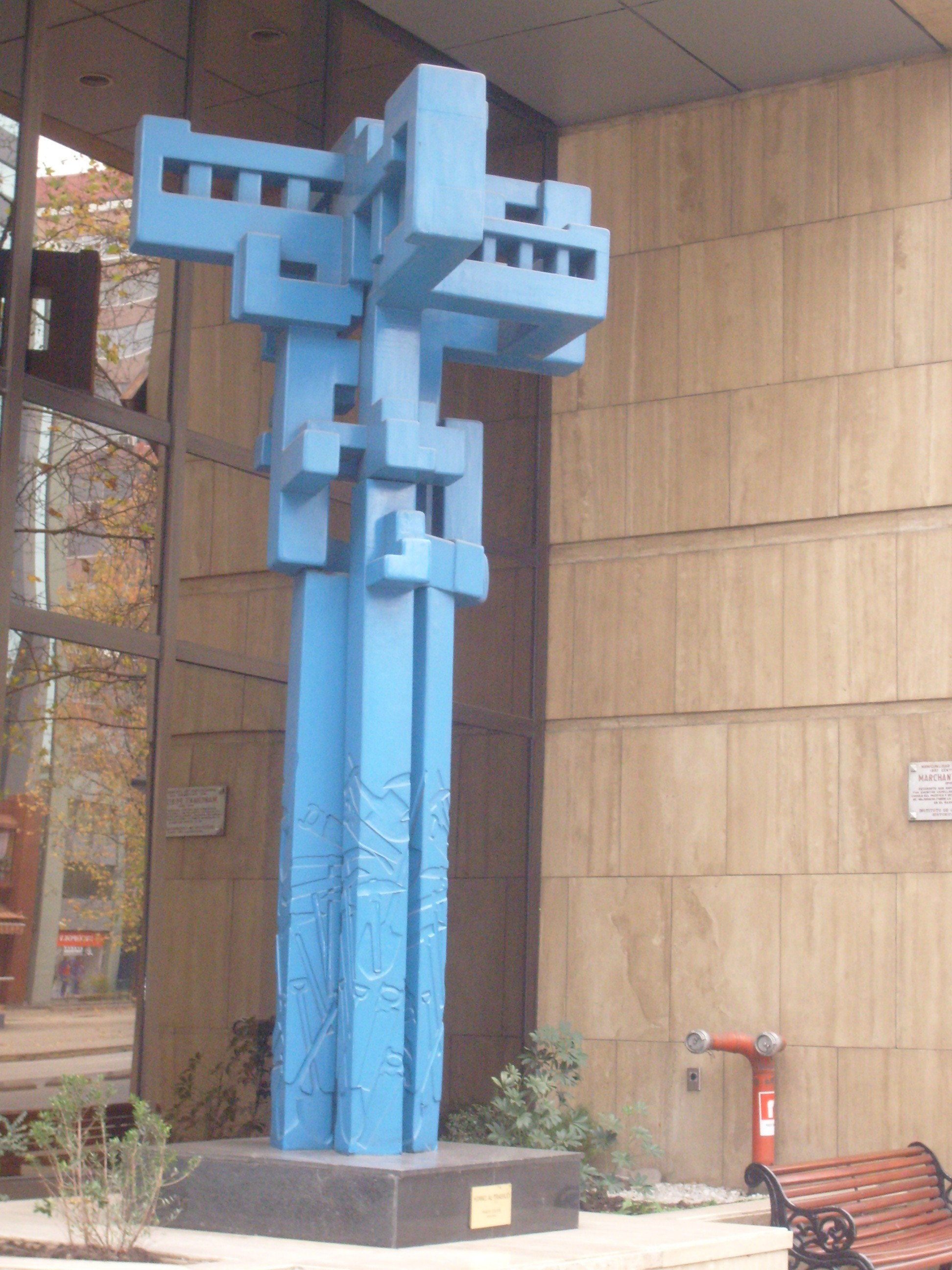
Himno al Trabajo

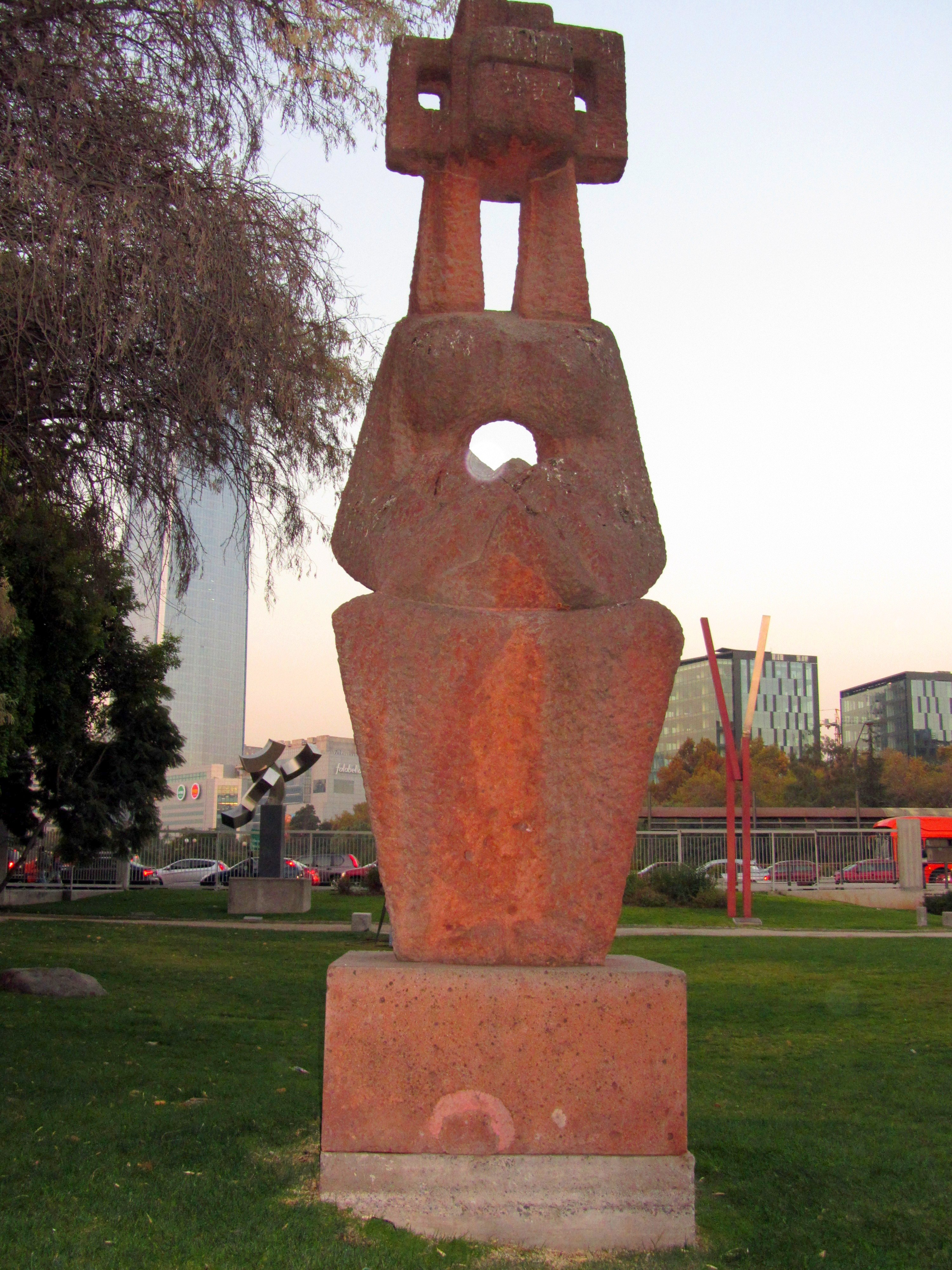
Colvin, Marta - Madre Tierra

- Silvia, 1946, bronze, 80 x 43 x 50 cm, Santiago Museum of Contemporary Art
- Danza para tu sombra, 1952, granit, 3,5 x 3 x 2,8 m, tomb of the dancer Isabel Glatzel, General Santiago Cemetery
- Buste de Benjamín Vicuña Mackenna, 1952, Square de l'Amérique-Latine, Paris
- Homenaje a la Neurocirugía, 1953, bronze, 3 m tall, Instituto de Neurocirugía, Santiago
- Eslabón, 1956, sycamore wood, 64cm de hauteur, Museo Nacional de Bellas Artes, Santiago
- Quinchamalí, 1956, wood, 1.27 x 0.55 x 0.5 m; Parque de las Esculturas Marta Colvin de Chillán
- Manutara, 1957, bronze, 1,6 m, Battersea Park, London
- Terra Mater, 1957, bois, 2 m; Pinacoteca de la Universidad de Concepción
- Andes, 1959, bronze, 0,50 m, Palais du Quirinal, Rome
- Yo sostengo tu cruz, 1960, bois, 2,3 m; Benedictine Monastery of the Santísima Trinidad de Las Condes, Santiago
- Signo solar / Grand Signe, 1963, Andes stone, 2,4 x 2 x 2,2 m, Musée de la sculpture en plein air, Paris
- Monumento a Laurita Lagos, 1964, Chillán stone, 3 m, Cimetiere de Chillán
- Las torres del silencio, 1960-1963, stone, 3,5 x 1,25 x 0,5 m, Musée de sculpture en plein air de Middelheim
- Vigías, 1968, polished wood, 2 m tall; Museo Nacional de Bellas Artes, Santiago
- Le Grand Signe, 1970, bronze, 2,4 x 2 x 2,2 m, Musée de la sculpture en plein air, Paris
- Mural de Osaka, 1970, stone and copper, Museum of Osaka
- Puerta del Sol, 1970, red Andes stone, Museum of Pontoise
- Señal del bosque / Signal en forêt, 1971, wood, 4,5 x 4 x 2 m, Forest of Sénart
- El árbol de la vida, 1971, stone, Centro Cultural Gabriela Mistral, Santiago
- Carrefour de l'esprit, 1972, wood, 4,5 x 4 x 2 m, College of Villepinte
- Caleuche (Nef), 1975, Andes stone, 3.5 x 2 x 2 m, port of Saint-Nazaire
- Victoire, 1978, stone, 4 x 3 x 2 m, Régiment Bouliac, Bordeaux
- Léviathan, 1977, wood, 4.5 x 3 x 3 m, Lycée Professionnel "Professeur Clerc" in Outreau (Pas-de-Calais)
- Mélusine, 1978, stone, 2,5 m, Collège de la Crèche, Niort
- Rosa de los vientos, 1979, stone, 3,60 x 3 x 3 m, Faculté d'Ontologie de l'Université de Paris
- Homenaje a los templarios, 1981, stone, 4 x 3,5 x 3 m, Ville Nouvelle de Saint-Quentin-en-Yvelines
- Espíritu del agua, 1982, bronze, 3 x 2 x 1,5 m, Plaza del General de Gaulle, Marly-le-Roi
- Vigía del mar, 1983, granite, 6,5 x 3 x 2 m, Fort Crozon, Brest, France
- Horizonte andino, 1986, stone, 0,21 x 0,46 x 0,16 m, Museo de Artes Visuales, Santiago
- Madre Tierra / Pachamama, 1986, red Andes stone, 4.18 x 1.26 x 1.04 m, Museo Parque de las Esculturas de Santiago
- Himno al trabajo, 1989, polychromed wood, Cámara Chilena de la Construcción, Santiago
- Señal de oriente y occidente / Signal, 1991, polychromed wood, 3.5 m, Sculpture park of Séoul
- Alas al viento, stone, sculpture park, University of Talca
- Monumento a Sucre, Plaza Sucre, Ñuñoa, Santiago
