= Javier de Villota =

Spanish painter, sculptor and architect (1942–2024)

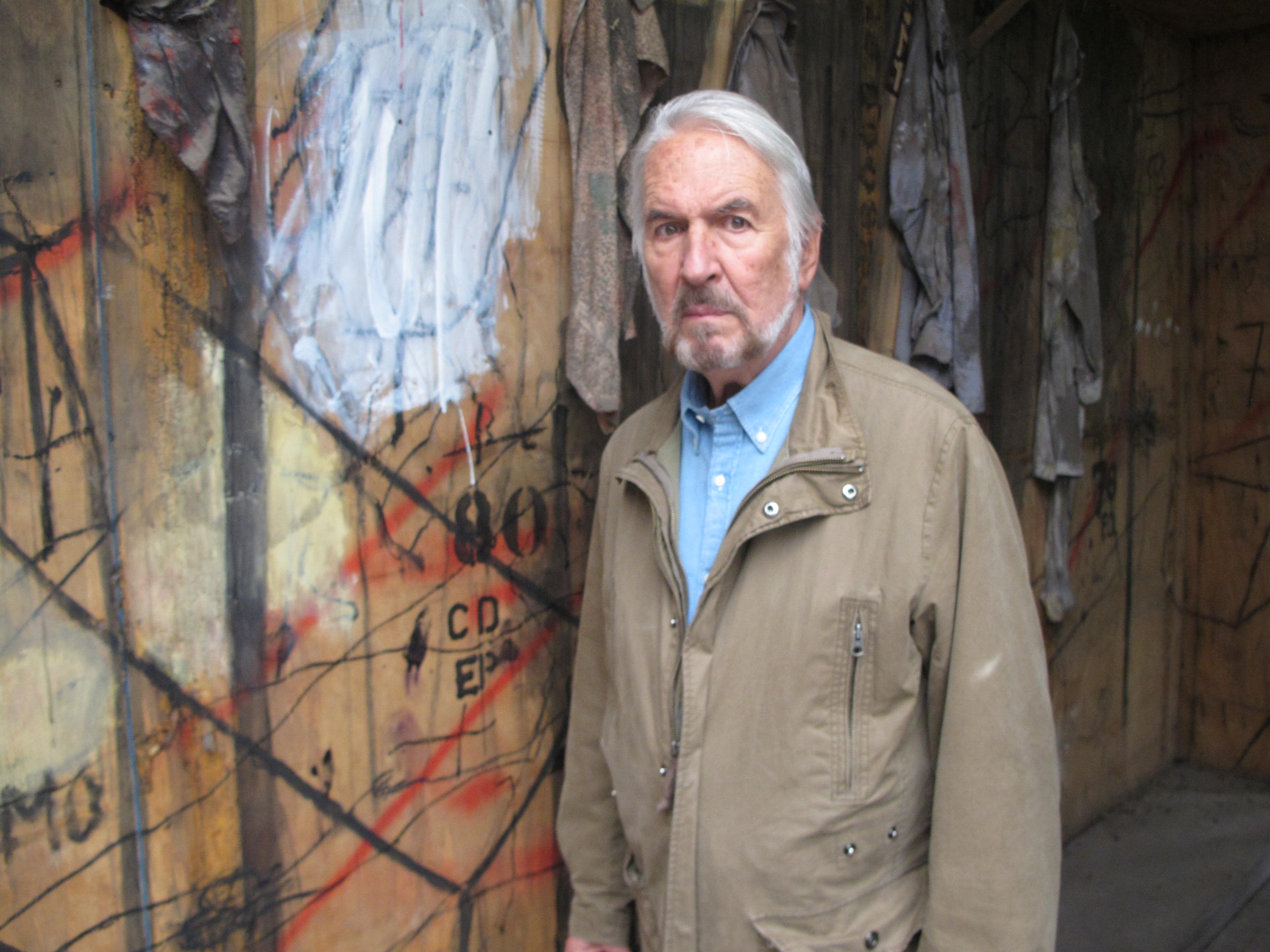
- De Villota in 2013
- Born: 17 March 1942; Madrid, Spain
- Died: 16 November 2024 (aged 82); Madrid, Spain
- Occupations: Painter, sculptor, architect

Javier de Villota (17 March 1942 – 16 November 2024) was a Spanish painter, sculptor and architect who came from two generations of artists, being the great-grandson of José Diaz y Palma and grandnephew of José Gutiérrez Solana who deeply influenced his career. De Villota was born in Madrid on 17 March 1942, and died there on 16 November 2024, at the age of 82.

== Bibliography ==
- Villota, F. J. D. (2001). Javier de Villota : retrospective 1970-2001 : Centro Cultural de la Villa, 25 September-4 November 2001. [Madrid], Concejalía de Cultura, Educación, Juventud y Deporte. ISBN 848840638X
- Villota, J. D., Villota, A. D., Mantecón, M., & Harithas, J. (2013). Ecos en la deshumanización: [Centro de Arte Alcobendas, from 21 May to 29 June 2013]. Alcobendas, Madrid, Centro de Arte Alcobendas. ISBN 9788493843199
- Spanish Institute (London). (1978). "Villota."
- Villota, F. J. D. (1971). Villota : catálogo exposición; marzo, 1972. Madrid, Grin-Gho, Galería de Arte Contemporáneo.
