= National Prize for Plastic Arts (Chile) =

- To the person who has distinguished himself by his achievements in the respective area of the arts
- Country: Chile
- Presented by: Ministry of Cultures, Arts and Heritage
- First award: 1992

The National Prize for Plastic Arts (Spanish: Premio Nacional de Artes Plásticas), also called the National Prize for Visual Arts, is the highest recognition granted by the government of Chile to a national artist. As part of the National Prize of Chile it is given to a person "due to their excellence, creativity, transcendent contribution to national culture and to the development of these fields and areas of knowledge and the arts".

The award was created in 1992 under Law 19169 as one category for the replacements of the National Prize of Art. The other categories are Musical Arts and Performing and Audiovisual Arts. It is granted "to the person who has distinguished himself by his achievements in the respective area of the arts" (Article 8 of the aforementioned law).

The prize is awarded every odd year. It consists of a diploma, a cash prize, and a monthly lifetime pension. The cash prize is adjusted every year, according to the previous year's consumer price index. In 2025 it was $6,562,457 pesos (US$8,647). The monthly pension is 20 monthly tax units (approximately US $1,600).

== Jury ==
All National Prize juries include:

- Minister of Cultures, Arts and Heritage
- Rector of the University of Chile
- Last award recipient

Jury for the Visual Arts Prize also includes:

- A representative of the Chilean Academy of Fine Arts
- An academic appointed by the Council of Rectors of Chilean Universities
- Two outstanding creators in the field of visual arts in the country, appointed by the National Council of Cultures, Arts and Heritage

== Laureates ==
Year	Laureate	Photo	Discipline	Example work	Name
1993	Sergio Montecino Montalva		Painter		
1995	Lily Garafulic		Sculptor		Imagen para el Bicentenario
1997	Sergio Castillo Mandiola		Sculptor		Erupción
1999	José Balmes		Painter		Corazón de hueso blanco
2001	Rodolfo Opazo Bernales		Painter, sculptor		Imágenes de barrio
2003	Gonzalo Díaz Cuevas		Painter, photographer		
2005	Eugenio Dittborn		Visual artist		La cocina y la guerra
2007	Guillermo Núñez		Painter, cartoonist		
2009	Federico Assler		Sculptor		Doble relieve y columna
2011	Gracia Barrios		Painter		Imagen con caballo negro
2013	Alfredo Jaar		Visual artist		One Million Finnish Passports
2015	Roser Bru		Painter, engraver		
2017	Paz Errázuriz		Photographer		
2019	Eduardo Vilches Prieto		Painter		
2021	Francisco Gazitúa		Sculptor		Esmeralda II
2023	Cecilia Vicuña		Visual artist		Eman si pasión - Parti si pasión (1974)
2025	Alejandro González		Painter and scenographer		Tribute to Women's Day (2016)
