= List of alumni of the University of Chile =

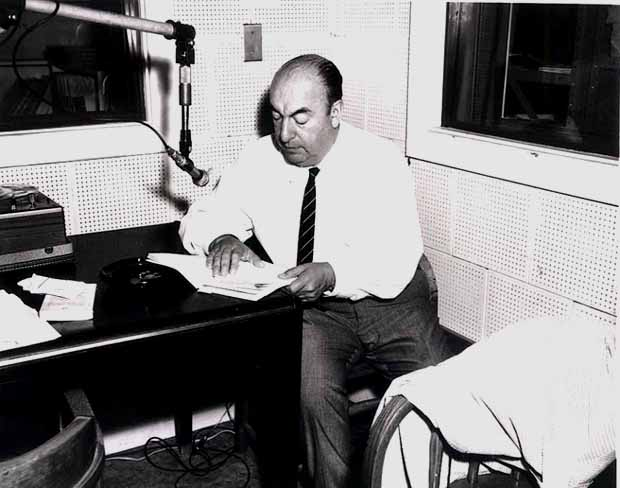
Pablo Neruda

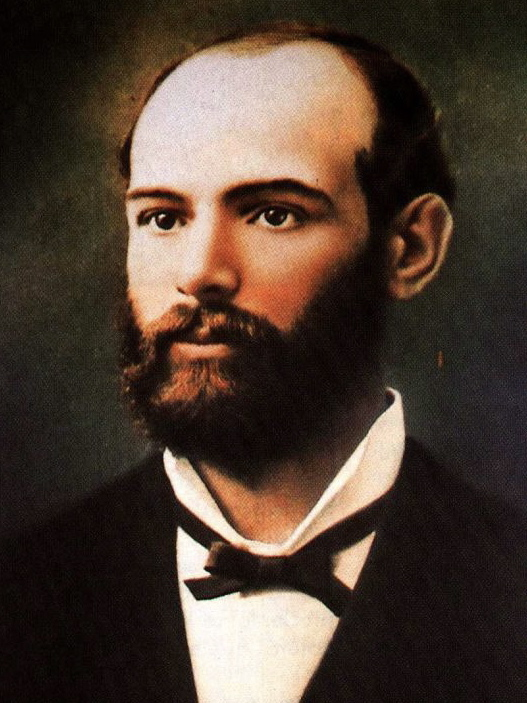
Arturo Prat

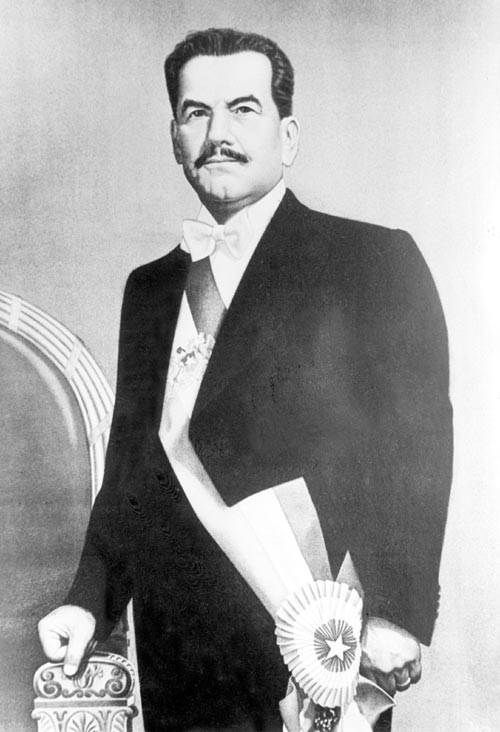
Pedro Aguirre Cerda

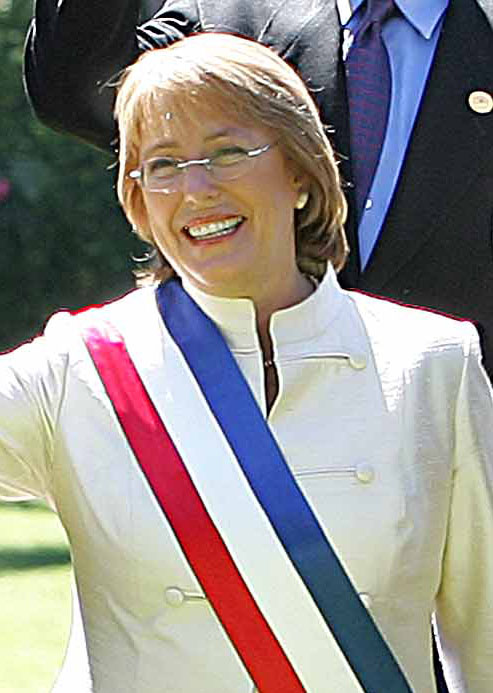
Michelle Bachelet

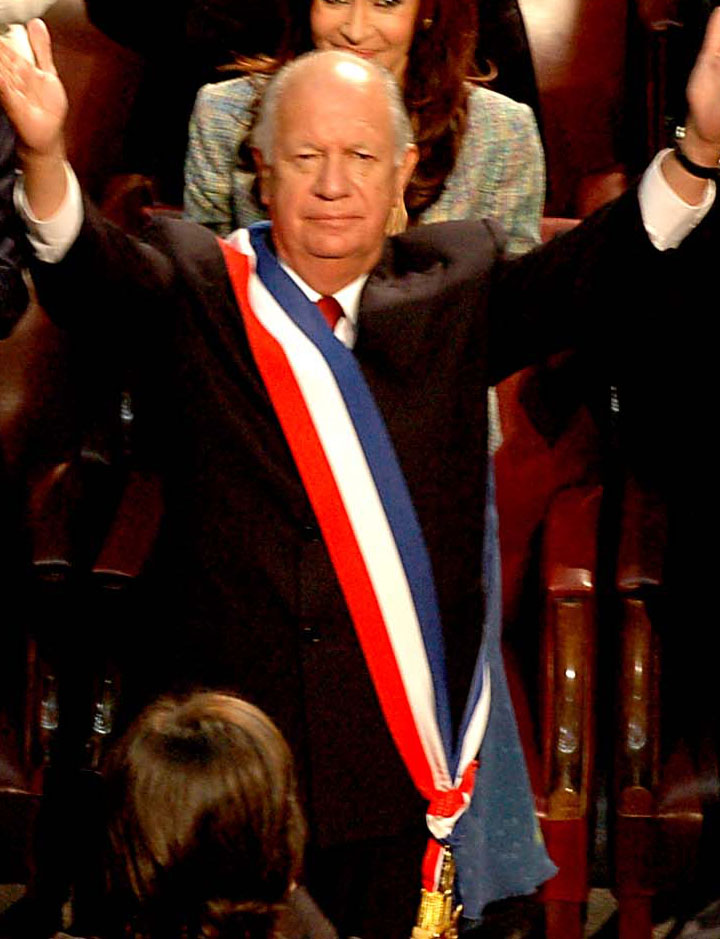
Ricardo Lagos

The following is a list of notable alumni of the University of Chile.

== Government, law, and public policy ==
=== Heads of state ===
- Pedro Aguirre Cerda (1938–1941) – lawyer and teacher
- Arturo Alessandri (1920–1925; 1932–1938) – lawyer
- Jorge Alessandri (1958–1964) – engineer
- Salvador Allende (1971–1973) – physician
- Patricio Aylwin (1990–1994) – lawyer
- Michelle Bachelet (2006–2010) – physician
- Ramón Barros Luco (1910–1915) – lawyer
- Carlos Dávila (de facto leader) – lawyer
- Federico Errázuriz Echaurren (1896–1901) – lawyer
- Federico Errázuriz Zañartu (1871–1876) – lawyer
- Emiliano Figueroa (1925–1927) – lawyer
- Eduardo Frei Ruiz-Tagle (1994–2000) – civil engineer
- Gabriel González Videla (1946–1952) – lawyer
- Ricardo Lagos (2000–2006) – lawyer
- Juan Esteban Montero (1931–1932) – lawyer
- Pedro Montt (1906–1910) – lawyer
- Aníbal Pinto (1876–1881) – lawyer
- Germán Riesco (1901–1906) – lawyer
- Juan Luis Sanfuentes (1915–1920) – lawyer
- Domingo Santa María (1881–1886) – lawyer

==== Foreign heads of state ====
- José López Portillo (México: 1976–1982) – lawyer
- Carlos Mesa (Bolivia) – lawyer
- Camilo Ponce Enríquez (politician) (Ecuador: 1956–1960) – lawyer

==== Non-Chilean politicians ====
- Schafik Handal – general secretary of Farabundo Martí National Liberation Front of El Salvador; law studies
- Marcelo Quiroga Santa Cruz – socialist political leader from Bolivia; brutally abducted and subsequently assassinated by military forces in 1980; law and drama studies
- José Vicente Rangel – Vice President of Venezuela (2002–2007); law studies
- José Serra – Governor of São Paulo state and Minister of Foreign Affairs of Brazil; Masters in Economics.

==== Notable lawyers ====
- Marcos Aburto – judge, former senator, and former president of the Supreme Court of Chile
- Cecilia Medina – Gruber Prize recipient, judge
- Arturo Prat Chacón – national hero, lawyer
- José Zalaquett – lawyer and professor on Human Rights, National Prize for Humanities and Social Sciences 2003

==== Civil Servants ====
- Joaquín Marcó Figueroa – superintendent of the Casa de Moneda de Chile, and author
- Valentina Quiroga – Undersecretary of Education (2014–2018)

== Business ==
- Eliodoro Matte – industrial engineer; billionaire; president of Empresas CMPC
- Julio Ponce Lerou – forestry engineer; businessman; controlling shareholder of Sociedad Química y Minera de Chile

== Economists ==
- Armando Di Filippo – Argentine economist
- Eduardo Engel – engineer and economist
- Manfred Max Neef – Right Livelihood Award winner, economist
- Aníbal Pinto Santa Cruz – economist National Prize for Humanities and Social Sciences 1995
- Paulo Renato Souza – economist and politician

== Arts ==
=== Literature ===
- José Donoso – National Literature Prize 1990
- Roque Dalton – Salvadoran poet and activist
- Jorge Edwards – National Literature Prize 1994
- Alberto Fuguet – writer, journalist, film director
- Gabriela Mistral – Nobel Prize 1945, National Literature Prize 1951; teacher
- Pablo Neruda – Nobel Prize 1971, National Literature Prize 1945
- Raquel Olea (born 1944), writer, professor
- Mariano Picón Salas – National Literature Prize of Venezuela 1954
- Antonio Skármeta – writer
- Volodia Teitelboim – National Literature Prize 2002

=== Music ===
- Luis Advis
- Mario Iriarte
- Víctor Jara
- Sergio Ortega
- Sonia Paz Soto-Aguilar Orellana (Pachi)
- Pablo Rosetti (Pablo)
- Horacio Salinas
- Santiago Vera-Rivera

=== Visual arts ===
- Graciela Aranis
- Catalina Bauer
- Elsa Bolívar
- Ximena Cristi
- Matilde Pérez
- Carmen Piemonte
- Aída Poblete
- Laura Rodig
- Benjamín Vicuña
- Cecilia Vicuña

== Humanities and Social Sciences ==
=== Anthropology ===
- María Ester Grebe – ethnomusicologist
- Sonia Montecino – National Prize for Humanities and Social Sciences 2013

=== History ===
- José Toribio Medina – bibliographer, prolific writer and historian
- Gabriel Salazar – National Prize of History 2006
- Benjamín Vicuña Mackenna – prolific writer and historian

=== Philosophy ===
- Carla Cordua Roberto Torretti – National Prize for Humanities and Social Sciences 2011
- Humberto Giannini – National Prize for Humanities and Social Sciences 1999
- Olga Grau, writer, professor, philosopher

=== Sociology ===
- Manuel Antonio Garretón – National Prize for Humanities and Social Sciences 2007
- Emir Sader – Brazilian sociologist, one of the World Social Forum organizers
- Clodomir Santos de Morais – Brazilian sociologist who originated the Organization Workshop (OW) and the associated Activity-based Large Group Capacitation Method (LGCM)

== Exact sciences ==
- Justicia Acuña
- Ricardo Baeza-Yates
- Claudio Bunster
- Claudio Donoso
- Cristina Dorador
- Eric Goles
- Humberto Maturana – National Prize of Natural Sciences 1994
- Hugo K. Sievers
