= Carmen Beuchat =

Chilean artist, choreographer and dancer

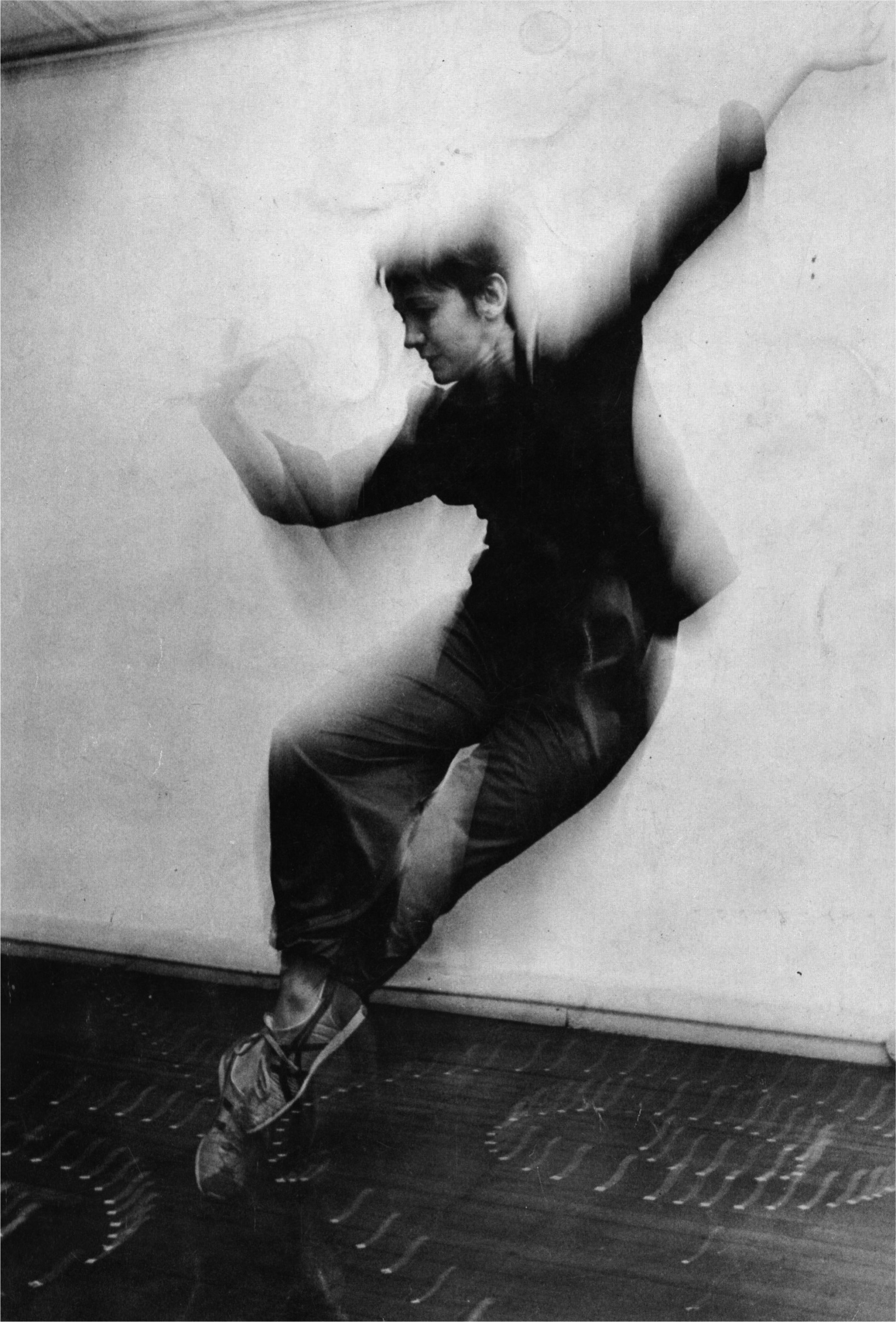
- Born: Carmen Luz Beuchat Leiva; 27 December 1941 (age 84); Santiago, Chile
- Education: University of Chile
- Occupations: Choreographer, dancer
- Awards: Pablo Neruda Order of Artistic and Cultural Merit (2005)
- Website: carmenbeuchat.org

Carmen Luz Beuchat Leiva (born 27 December 1941) is a Chilean artist, choreographer, and dancer recognized for her development of postmodern dance in the United States during the 1960s and 1970s.

== Biography ==
Carmen Beuchat was born in Santiago, Chile in 1941. She began her career in classical and modern dance as a student of Yerka Luksic, at four years of age. She continued her studies at the Dance School of the University of Chile with professors such as Patricio Bunster, Joan Turner, and Sigurd Leeder.

In 1964 she formed Trío 65, the first Chilean independent dance company, with dancers Gaby Concha and Rosa Celis. Towards the end of the same decade, she migrated to the United States, actively participating in the New York art scene. A founding member of the collective The Natural History of the American Dancer, Carmen Beuchat developed a link between her visual and choreographic work with a strong emphasis on spatial composition, incorporating the use of mobile structures in her choreography, presenting her work in spaces such as the 112 Greene St. Gallery, Whitney Museum, The Kitchen, Judson Church, Everson Museum of Art, and the Bronx Museum, among many others.

During her life, Carmen Beuchat has collaborated with artists such as Juan Downey, Gordon Matta-Clark, Richard Nonas, and Enrique Castro-Cid. She was an assistant to Robert Rauschenberg, danced in the first company of Trisha Brown, and in Kei Takei's Moving Earth Dance Company. She participated in projects with Jaime and Alfonso Barrios and photographer Marcelo Montealegre.

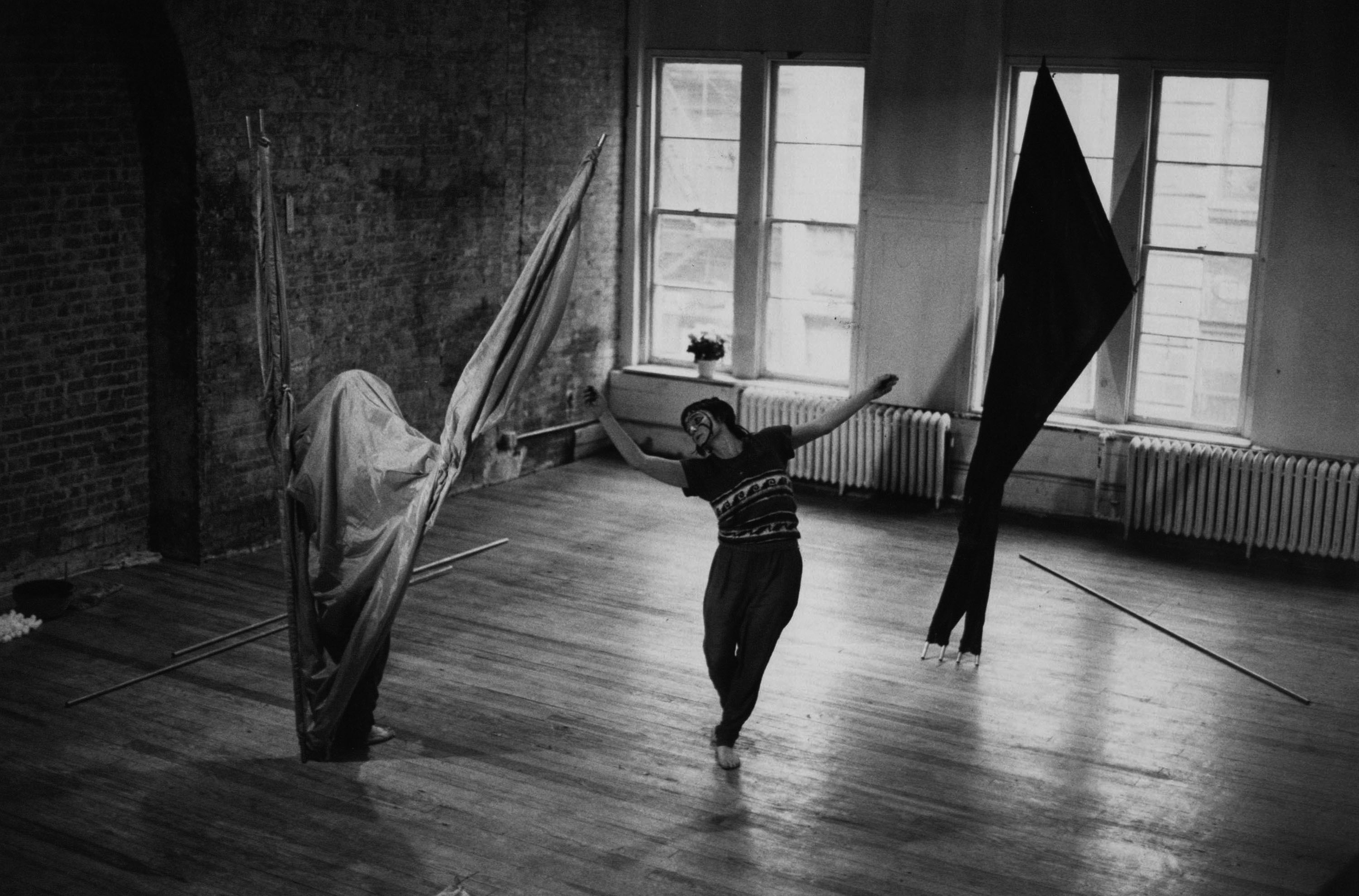
Two Not One (1975)

In Chile she is recognized as the originator of contact improvisation and other postmodern dance techniques. In the midst of the military dictatorship, during her trips to Chile in 1977 and 1985, she conducted dance workshops promoting an aesthetic transformation in the local scene, promoting a philosophy of democratization around the body in movement.

In the 1990s she settled in Chile, serving as director of the Dance School of University ARCIS, and generating a series of creative and educational projects in Santiago and Valparaíso.

She currently lives in Quetroleufú, Araucanía Region, where she receives constant visits from students, dancers, and creators.

== Distinctions ==
- 2005 Pablo Neruda Order of Artistic and Cultural Merit

== Works ==
- 1967 – Jeronimo Bosch (Casa de la Cultura de Ñuñoa, Santiago, Chile)
- 1972 – Energy Fields (112 Greene Street Gallery, New York)
- 1972 – Mass in CB Minor or the Brown Table (112 Greene Street Gallery, New York)
- 1972 – Ice (in collaboration with Trisha Brown, Kei Takei, and Richard Nonas, 112 Greene Street Gallery, New York)
- 1973 – The Natural History of the American Dancer Lesser Known Species (131 Prince Street, New York)
- 1974 – The Flag (in collaboration with Juan Downey, The Kitchen, New York)
- 1974 – Nazca (in collaboration with Juan Downey, The Kitchen, New York)
- 1974 – Line Drawings (The Natural History of the American Dancer, Artist's Space, New York)
- 1975 – 3 Dances (The Kitchen, New York)
- 1975 – I Am Two: The Line Straight Ahead, Right and Left - The One Who Passes The Door And The Door Itself (The Kitchen, New York)
- 1975 – Steal With Style: We Are The Ones Who Sits And The One Who Sits At The Left (The Kitchen, New York)
- 1975 – Butterfly: In a logical Structure Life Goes By (in collaboration with Kei Takei, The Kitchen, New York)
- 1975 – Thoughts by Tagore (St. Marks in the Bowery, New York)
- 1975 – Common Ground (New York)
- 1975 – Two Not One (in collaboration with Cynthia Hedstrom, Grommet Theatre, New York)
- 1975 (1980) – Getting Off the Ground (Danspace, St. Mark's Church, New York)
- 1975 – Vignettes (St. Mark's Church, New York)
- 1976 – One step to the Illusion (Common Ground Festival, Fordham University, New York)
- 1976 – Structures (Common Ground Festival, Fordham University, New York)
- 1976 – Performance en A Month of Sundays (P.S.1, New York)
- 1978 – I am a Rock (New York)
- 1979 – Ice Skating (New York)
- 1980 – Clear Water (Japan House, New York)
- 1980 – Monologue / Dialogue (in collaboration with Cynthia Hedstrom, New York)
- 1981 – Alma Mater (New York)
- 1981 – Bach Variation Theme (New York)
- 1982 – Obstacle (New York)
- 1982 – From Anywhere (New York)
- 1982 – Marilyn Monroe (New York)
- 1983 – Exactly How It Is (Washington Square Church, New York)
- 1983 – Perpetual Surprise (New York)
- 1983 – Firebird (New York)
- 1983 – Carmina Burana (Post Theatre Company, New York)
- 1984 – Spirit, Water and Blood (Tokyo, Japón)
- 1985 – Estructuras (Teatro Universidad Católica, Santiago, Chile)
- 1985 – The Moon is a Witness (New York)
- 1987 – The Man Who Turned into a Dog (Ohio Theatre, New York)
- 1987 – Uno, Dos (New York)
- 1987 – Twonotone Performing (in collaboration with Cathy Zimmerman, Merce Cunnigham's Studio, New York)
- 1989 – Interrupted Song (New York)
- 1990 – Owed (Broome Street Theater, New York)
- 1990 – Broken Wheel (El Castillo Art Center, New York)
- 1990 – Owed II: Broken Wheel (Broome Street Theatre, New York)
- 1991 – Nuevas Estructuras: The Fish and the Swan (National Museum of Fine Arts, Chile)
- 1991 – La Sirenita (National Museum of Fine Arts, Santiago, Chile)
- 1991 – Sequestered Cargo (Teatro Repertorio Español, New York)
- 1992 – Dancing for Living – Danzando por la vida (Sala Abril, Santiago, Chile)
- 1994 – San Juan el Hospitalario (National Museum of Fine Arts and Teatro Novedades, Santiago Chile)
- 1996 – Comida Para Todos y Poto Tranquilo (University ARCIS, Santiago, Chile)
- 1998 – Via Crucis (National Museum of Fine Arts, Santiago, Chile)
- 1999 – Compañía Santo Remedio (Museo Chileno de Arte Precolombino, Santiago, Chile)
- 2000 – Santos (Cloisters Museum, New York)
- 2000 – Tu No Sabes Nada (Museum of Contemporary Art, Santiago, Chile)
- 2004 – Mi Mundo Frente a Ti (Goethe-Institut, Santiago, Chile)
- 2006 – Inmigrantes (Compañía Balmaceda 1215, Valparaíso, Chile)
- 2008 – Pliegues Y Despliegues (Carmen Beuchat and Company, Valparaíso, Chile)
- 2010 – Especie Sola (Carmen Beuchat and Company, Sala de Arte Escénico of Playa Ancha University, Valparaíso, Chile)
- 2010 – Canción Desesperada, Mar Ensangrentado (Carnavales Culturales of Valparaíso, Chile)
- 2012 – El Primer Gesto (Carmen Beuchat and Company, Parque Cultural of Valparaíso, Chile)
- 2016 – Two Not One II (1975–2016) (Carpenter Center for the Visual Arts, Harvard University)

=== Collaborations ===
- 1969 - Light (Kei Takei's Moving Earth Company)
- 1969 – Lunch (Kei Takei's Moving Earth Company)
- 1970 – Floor of the forest (Trisha Brown Dance Company)
- 1970 – Leaning Duets (Trisha Brown Dance Company)
- 1971 – Walking on the Wall (Trisha Brown Dance Company)
- 1971 – Leaning Duets II (Trisha Brown Dance Company)
- 1971 – Rummage Sale and the Floor of the forest (Trisha Brown Dance Company)
- 1972 – Theme and Variation (Trisha Brown Dance Company)
- 1972 – Energy Fields (Juan Downey, New York)
- 1973 – Accumulating Pieces (Trisha Brown Dance Company)
- 1973 – Group Accumulation (Trisha Brown Dance Company)
- 1973 – Group Primary Accumulation (Trisha Brown Dance Company)
- 1973 – Roof and Fire Piece (Trisha Brown Dance Company)
- 1973–1976 – Structured Pieces I (Trisha Brown Dance Company)
- 1974 – Figure 8 (Trisha Brown Dance Company)
- 1974 – Drift (Trisha Brown Dance Company)
- 1974 – Spiral (Trisha Brown Dance Company)
- 1974 – Structured Pieces II (Trisha Brown Dance Company)
- 1974 – Debriefing Pyramid Video Trans America (Juan Downey, Everson Museum of Art, New York)
- 1974 – Videodances (Barbara Dilley & Juan Downey, Byrd Hoffman Studio, New York)
- 1974 – Las Meninas (Juan Downey, New York)
- 1989 – The Last Rice Field (Kei Takei's Moving Earth Company)
