= Santiago Museum of Contemporary Art =

Museum in Santiago, Chile

Coordinates: 33°26′07″S 70°38′39″W

- Museo de Arte Contemporáneo de Santiago
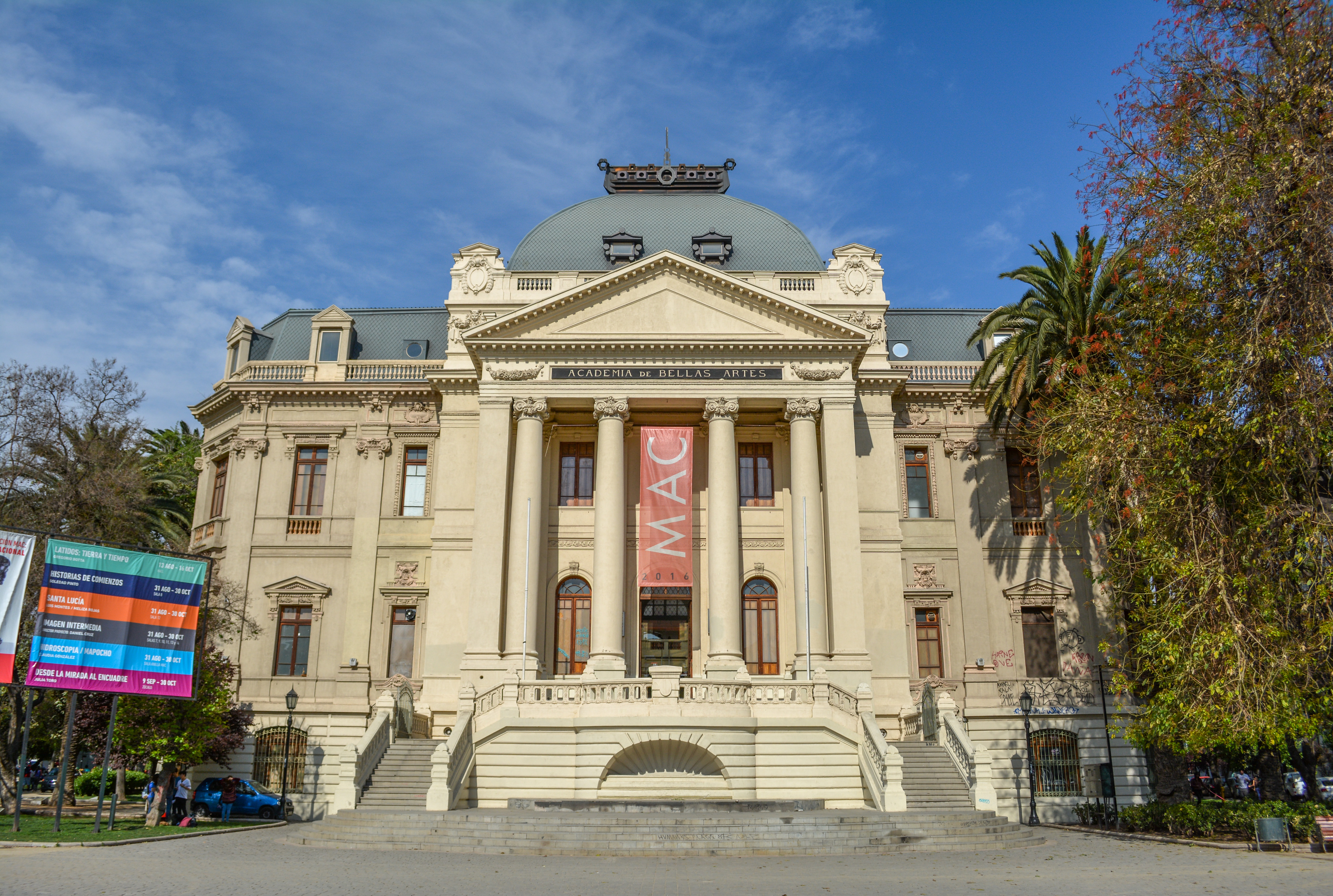
- Museum view from Parque Forestal.
- Established: 1947
- Location: Parque Forestal; Quinta Normal
- Type: Modern art and contemporary art
- Director: Francisco Brugnoli
- Curator: Montserrat Rojas
- Website: http://www.mac.uchile.cl

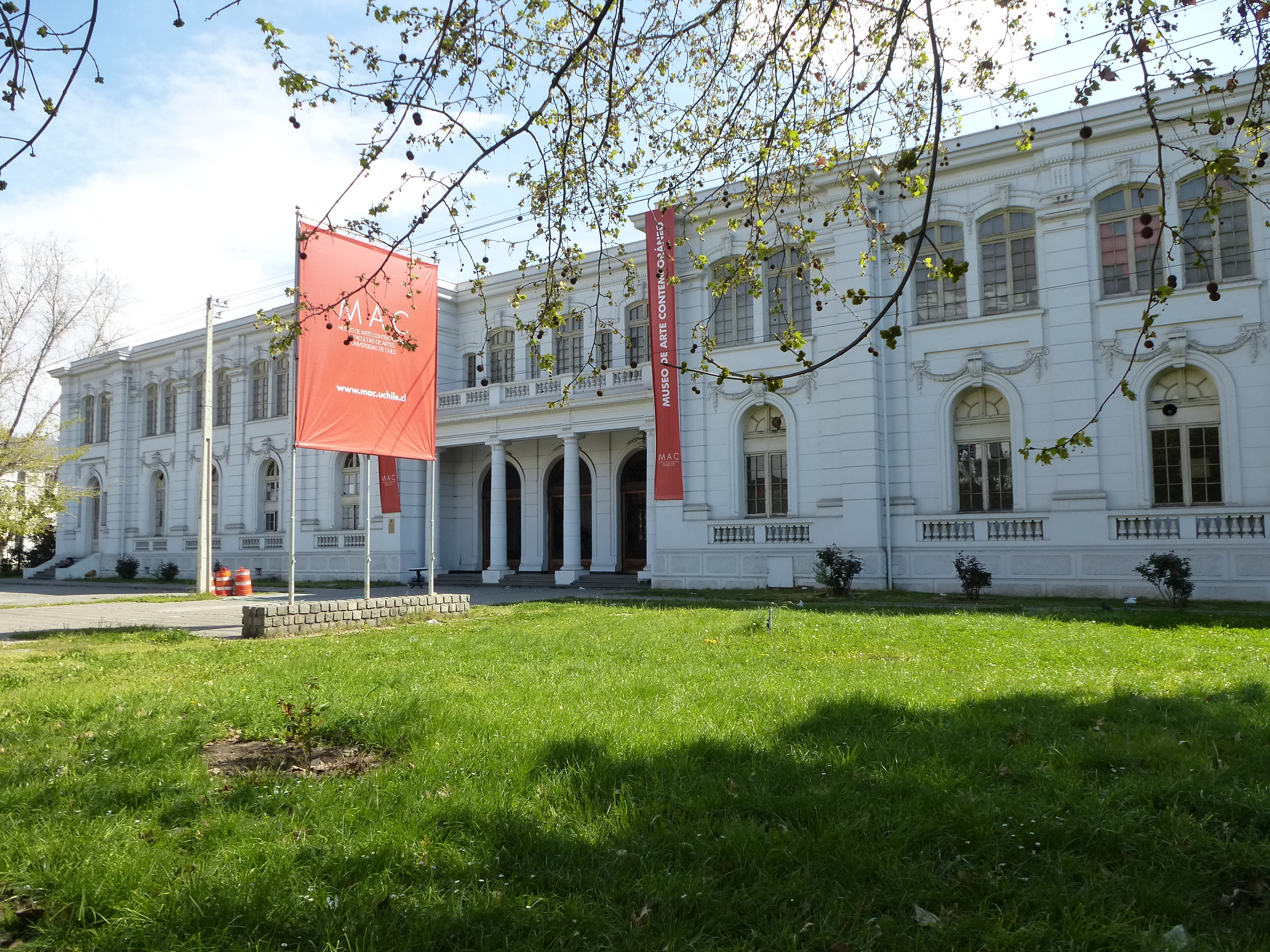
Museum view from Quinta Normal.

The Santiago Museum of Contemporary Art (Spanish: Museo de Arte Contemporáneo de Santiago or MAC) is located in Santiago, Chile. It is one of the city's major museums, created in 1947, and is run by the University of Chile Faculty of Arts. Since 2005, the museum has had two separate sites: MAC Parque Forestal and MAC Quinta Normal Park.

The museum specializes in modern and contemporary art and focuses on the development, study, and dissemination of modern art through exhibitions and other activities. It also concentrates on protecting the cultural heritage that forms its collection, which is made up by over 2,000 pieces and files.

One of the museum's sites is located in Parque Forestal behind the Chilean National Museum of Fine Arts (Spanish: Museo Nacional de Bellas Artes) and sharing its grand Palacio de Bellas Artes building. The other site is located in Quinta Normal Park.

== History ==
The museum was created by law in 1946, and inaugurated on August 15, 1947, in the building known as El Partenón in Quinta Normal Park. Its main purpose was to promote and serve as a platform for spread the work of contemporary artists, as part of the University of Chile's policy to contribute to the development of cultural life in Chilean society. In 1974, the museum moved to the building of the Palacio de Bellas Artes (Fine Arts Palace) in Parque Forestal, where it is still located today.

In its six decades, the museum has collected many works by Chilean artists as well as some international pieces. Its collection originated from its first exhibition, to which both Chilean and foreign artists resident in Chile loaned their works – and later donated some of them permanently. The valuable heritage has been growing over the years, mainly through donation, purchase and competitions held to add more pieces to the collection.

The museum collection currently holds around 2,000 pieces. The most complete and important are its collections of nearly 1,000 engravings and nearly 600 paintings, with another 130 drawings, watercolours and sketches and some 80 sculptures completing the collection. The pieces date from the late 19th century through to the modern day, and include the work of artists such as Roberto Matta, Nemesio Antúnez, Matilde Pérez, José Balmes and important international art figures as Oswaldo Guayasamín (Ecuador), Emilio Pettoruti (Argentina), Friedensreich Hundertwasser (Austria), Isamu Noguchi (US), David Batchelor (England), Jesús Ruiz Nestosa (Paraguay) and Dino Bruzzone (Argentina).

== Mission ==
The museum's mission is twofold. The first, as part of the University of Chile, is educational, relating the university's goal of being a pluralistic institution that hosts the widest possible range of the cultural diversity that forms Chilean society. The museum uses art as a medium of expression and social inclusion, promoting debate and reflection on all the fields of human knowledge.

The second strand of the MAC's mission is simply to be a high quality, specialist museum of modern and contemporary art. It explores new ways of creating art, managing for this purpose, both, his collection and curatorial line, regarding the national and international exhibitions invited, from a contemporary look, that is reflected since the origins of the museum, through the samples exposed.

Through this dual mission, the museum aims to deliver on its commitment to build bridges between society and new forms of artistic expression, hosting different and sometimes unconventional community involvement activities.

=== Objectives ===
The MAC defines itself as an institution permanently open to the public with the following objectives:

- Preserve the pieces that make up the museum's collection.
- Document and investigate the works in its collection.
- Expand the collection through donations from prominent national and international artists.
- Disseminate the museum's cultural heritage through various activities.
- Produce and curate exhibitions of modern and contemporary art.
- Build bridges between new artistic trends, the public and the student community.

== Architecture ==
Quinta Normal Park site

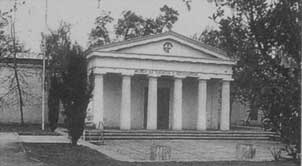
The Partenón building in Quinta Normal Park, the first location of the Chilean National Museum of Fine Arts

The Partenón in Quinta Normal Park was the location of the first fine arts museum in Chile and one of the first in the Americas. Inaugurated in 1885, it originally displayed the works of a group of Chilean painters headed up by Pedro Lira. In 1910, as part of the celebrations for Chile's first centenary, the current Chilean National Museum of Fine Arts was inaugurated in Parque Forestal and took on the functions of the old Quinta Normal Park building. The old building was abandoned until 1915, and on various occasions was used as school, gymnasium and storage place.

In 1945, the painter Marco Aurelio Bontá Costa recovered the building for the arts and in 1946 opened the Museum of Contemporary Art. Bontá Costa selected the pieces on display to give an overview of Chilean art of the 20th century.

The museum moved in 1974 to a new location in the western part of Chilean National Museum of Fine Arts building in Parque Forestal. In 1985, an earthquake damaged the old Quinta Normal building and from 1998 it has been some efforts in order to repair him.

Parque Forestal building

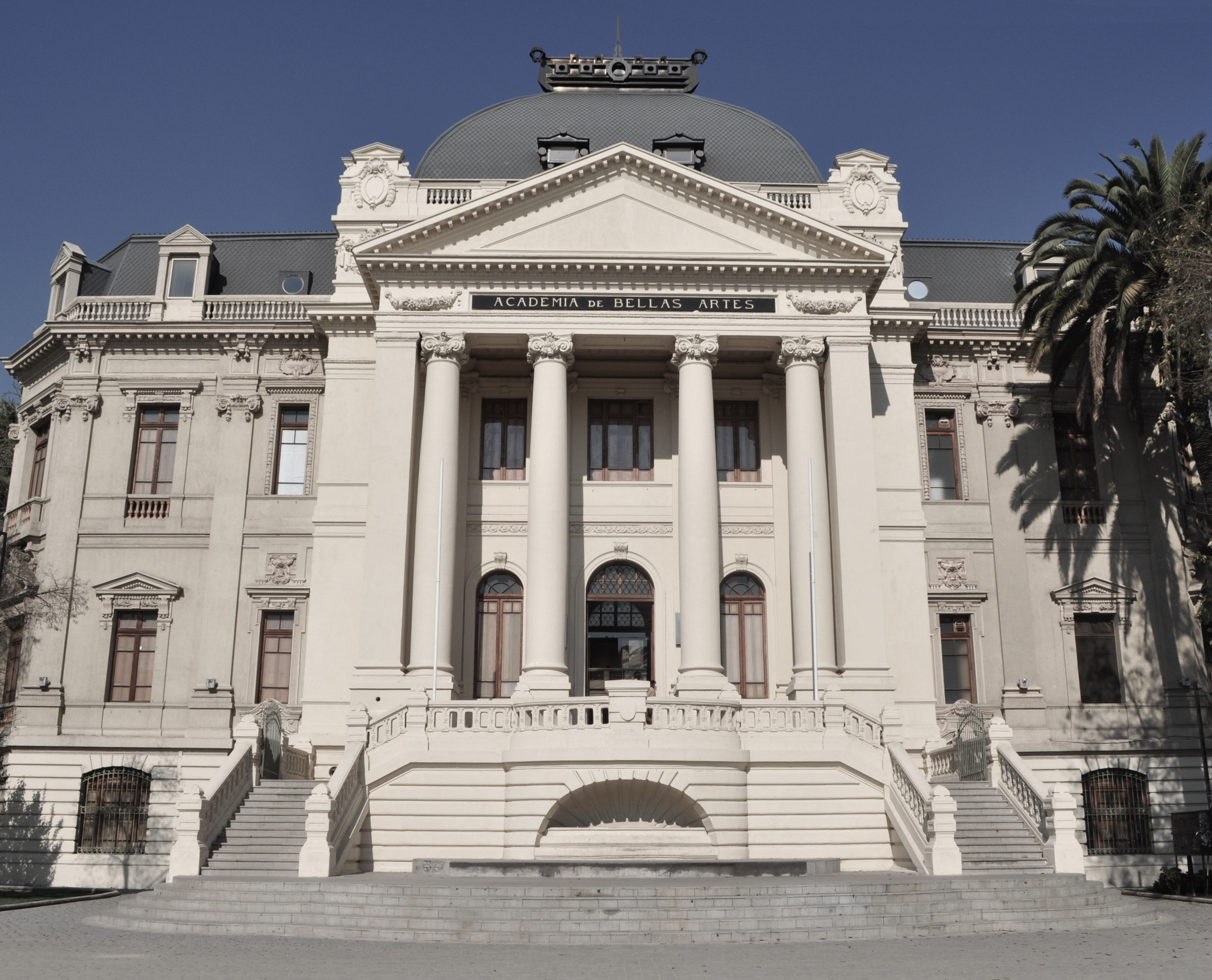
"Museo de Arte Contemporáneo Santiago". On the front can be read the sign: "Academia de Bellas Artes" (Academy of Fine Arts), which was the building's use before the museum moved here.

This building is a typical example of Neoclassical/Art Nouveau architecture, designed by the Chilean architect Emile Jéquier. It was built in the 19th century for the centenary of Chile's independence, which was celebrated in 1910. The building's western front (the home of the MAC) was damaged in the 2010 Chile earthquake.

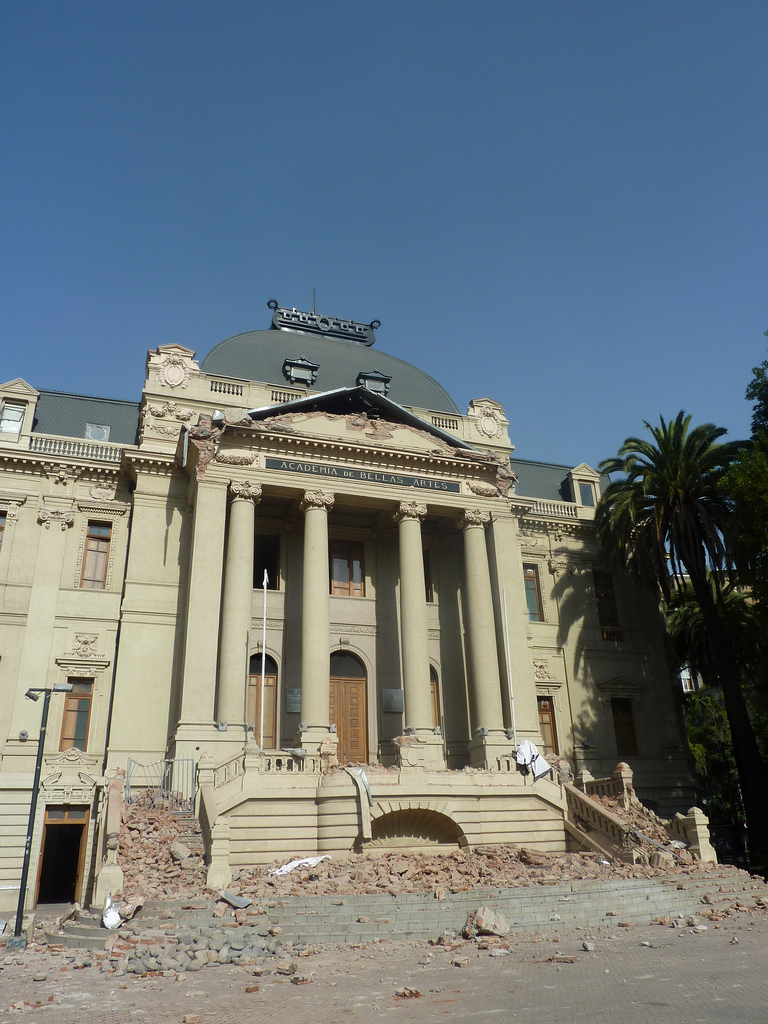
Condition of the museum after the 2010 earthquake

== Directors of the museum ==
The director of the museum is named by the rector of the University of Chile, who chooses from a list of five candidates selected by the dean of the university's school of fine arts.

MAC directors to date have been:

- Marco Bontá (1949–1962)
- Nemesio Antúnez (1962–1964)
- Luis Oyarzún (1964–1965)
- Federico Assler (1965–1968)
- Alberto Pérez (1968–1970)
- Guillermo Núñez (1971–1972)
- Lautaro Labbé (1972–1973)
- Eduardo Ossandón (1973–1976)
- Marta Benavente (1976–1980)
- Dolores Mujica (1981–1991)
- Rosario Letelier (1991–1998)
- Francisco Brugnoli (1998 to date)
