= Mireya Baltra =

Chilean sociologist, journalist, and politician (1932–2022)

Mireya Baltra Moreno
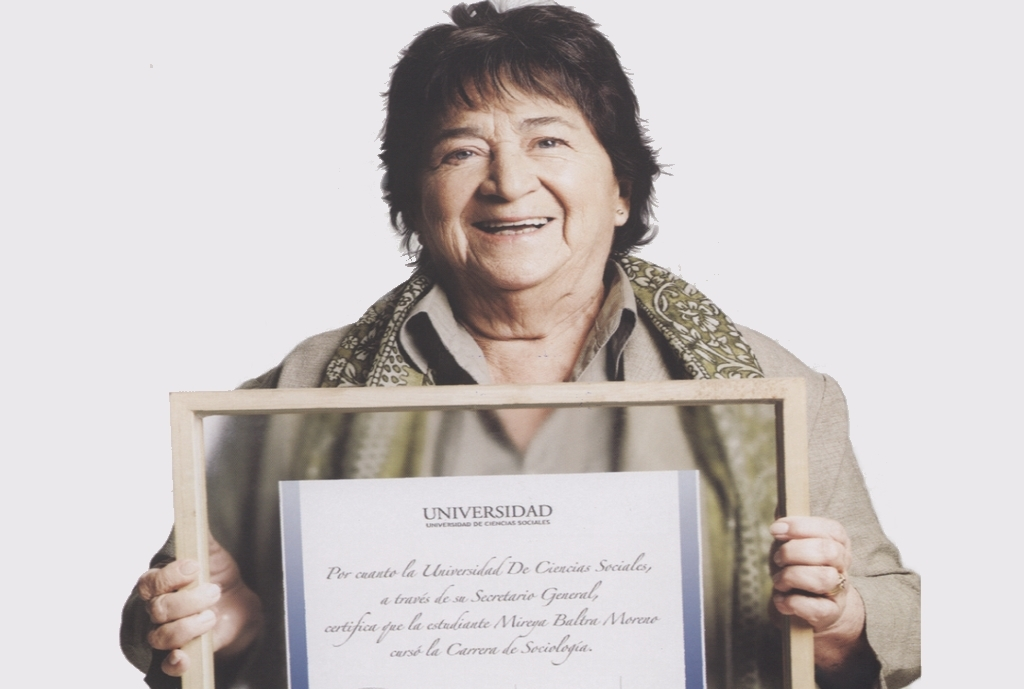
- Mireya Baltra Moreno

Councillor
- In office 1963–1969

Deputy (legislator)
- In office 1969 – 21 September 1973
- Constituency: Santiago, 1st and 4th districts

Minister of Labour and Social Welfare
- In office 17 June 1972 – 2 November 1972
- President: Salvador Allende
- Preceded by: José Oyarce
- Succeeded by: Luis Figueroa Mazuela

Personal details
- Born: 25 February 1932 Santiago, Chile
- Died: 17 April 2022 (aged 90) Santiago, Chile
- Party: Communist Party of Chile
- Parent(s): José Baltra Baltra, María Moreno Cabezas
- Occupation: Politician, journalist

Mireya Baltra Moreno (25 February 1932 – 17 April 2022) was a Chilean sociologist, journalist, and politician of the Communist Party of Chile. She was a councillor (1963–1969) and a deputy (1969–1973) for Santiago, and served as Minister of Labour and Social Welfare in Salvador Allende's government.

== Early life ==
Baltra was the daughter of José Baltra Baltra and María Moreno Cabezas, newsvendors in the centre of Santiago. Her father was a member of the Radical Party.

Baltra attended school at the Liceo Manuel de Salas and the Liceo N° 5 de Niñas. From childhood onward she helped her parents at their news kiosk in central Santiago. In 1957 she set up as a newsvendor on her own account, with another kiosk which she described as her “own viewpoint for social observation”.

She also worked as a reporter for Vea magazine from 1948 to 1950, and as a columnist for the newspaper El Siglo from 1960 to 1964, her first article being "La mujer como fuerza política" ("Women as a political force"). She also wrote for El Espectador and Las Noticias de Última Hora.

As a newsvendor she joined the journalists' union, and was elected head of the women's section and promoted to the National Federation of Journalists. Then in 1962 she joined the leadership of the Workers' United Center of Chile (CUT).

== Political career ==
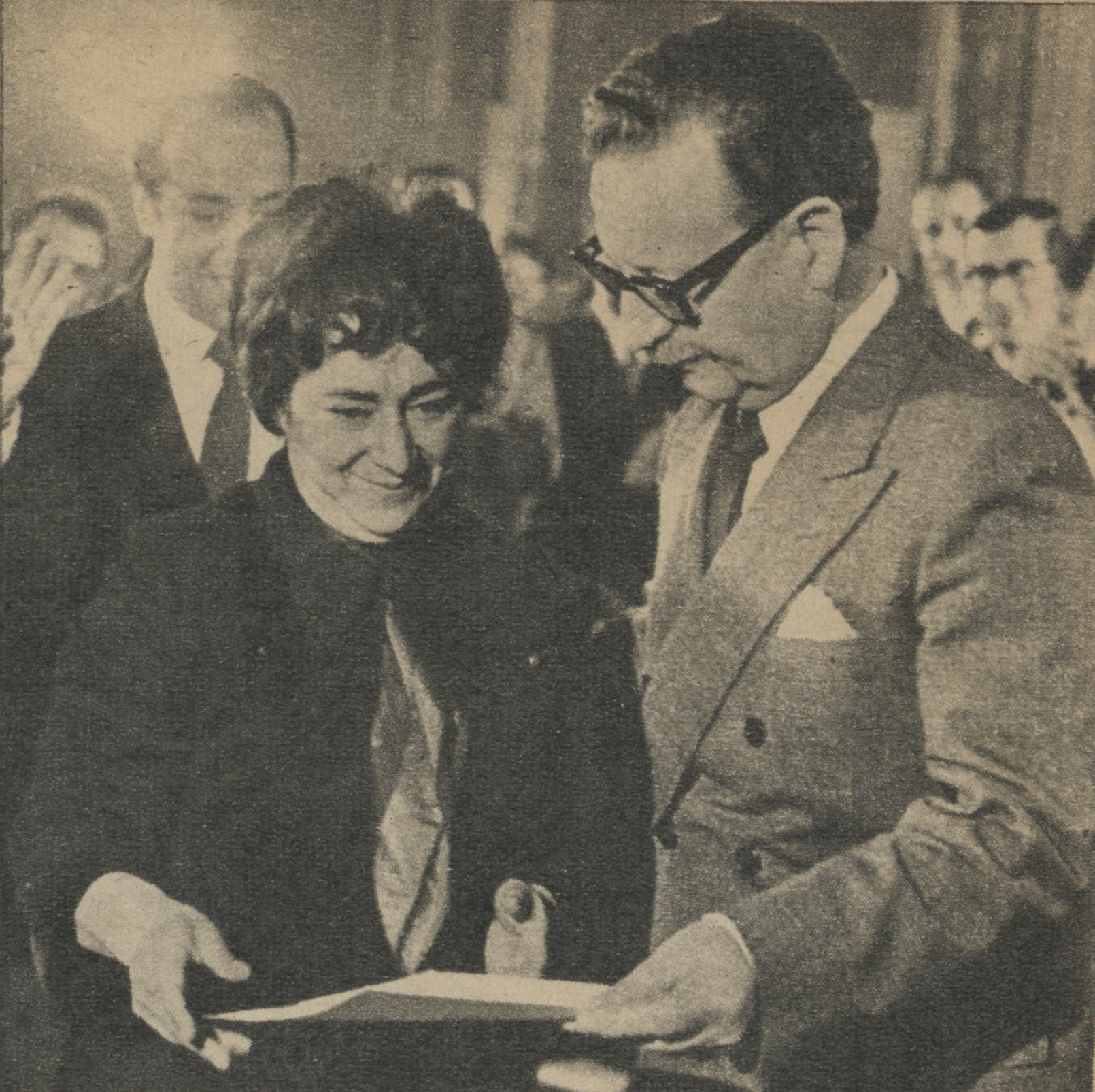
Baltra with Salvador Allende

In 1963 Baltra was elected to the Santiago council, and was re-elected in 1967. In 1969 she was elected deputy for the 1st district of Santiago. In June 1972 she resigned her position as deputy on being appointed by President Allende as Minister of Labour and Social Welfare, a post she held until 2 November. In the March 1973 elections she was re-elected as deputy, this time for the 4th district, and held this position until the military coup on 11 September of that year.

=== Asylum and exile ===
Within a few days of the coup, the newly established dictatorship of Augusto Pinochet issued decrees under which Baltra, together with other prominent women in the Popular Unity government, were ordered to report to the Defence Ministry under threats of “facing the consequences” if they refused. The leadership of the Communist Party decided to seek asylum in the Dutch embassy. Together with others including Gladys Marín, secretary-general of the Communist Youth of Chile, senator Julieta Campusano, and Orlando Millas, Minister of Finance in Allende's government, they remained in asylum at the embassy for nine months.

In 1974 she went into exile, first in the Netherlands and later in Czechoslovakia. In Prague she became secretary-general of the international trade union body formed to express solidarity with Chilean workers. After nine years she travelled to Cuba and became executive secretary of the Continental Women's Front against the coup, working with Vilma Espín, president of the Cuban Women's Federation.

=== Return to Chile ===
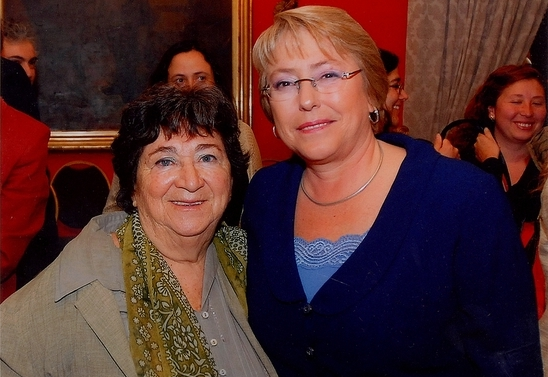
Baltra and Michelle Bachelet

In 1987 Baltra and Julieta Campusano re-entered Chile clandestinely, crossing the Andes from Argentina on horseback, accompanied by drovers and Argentine communist leaders. She had previously tried to enter Chile with other exiles: two attempts in planes, which were turned back to Argentina; and also through the Cuevas tunnel between Argentina and Chile, when twenty-one Chilean exiles were arrested, beaten and sent back to Argentina by agents of the CNI and the Carabineros de Chile.

Now on arrival in Chile, Baltra and Campusano presented themselves at the court of justice with the lawyers Enrique Krauss and Jaime Castillo Velasco, who claimed habeas corpus for the women. The military regime sent them away: Campusano to Camiña in the north of the country, and Baltra to Aysén in the south.

She returned to Santiago and joined the struggle against the military dictatorship. She was arrested after a secret press conference, and given a prison sentence under state security laws and for illicit association.

In the 1990s, still with the support of the Communist Party, she tried to return to parliament in the elections for deputy in 1993 and senator in 1997; but was defeated in both contests. She was a member of the editorial board of Crónica digital: información para cada día (Digital daily news), contributing articles on political topics and historical subjects.

== Death ==
Baltra died on 17 April 2022 in Santiago, aged 90.
