= Liceo Manuel de Salas =

Coordinates: 33.45450°S 70.59119°W

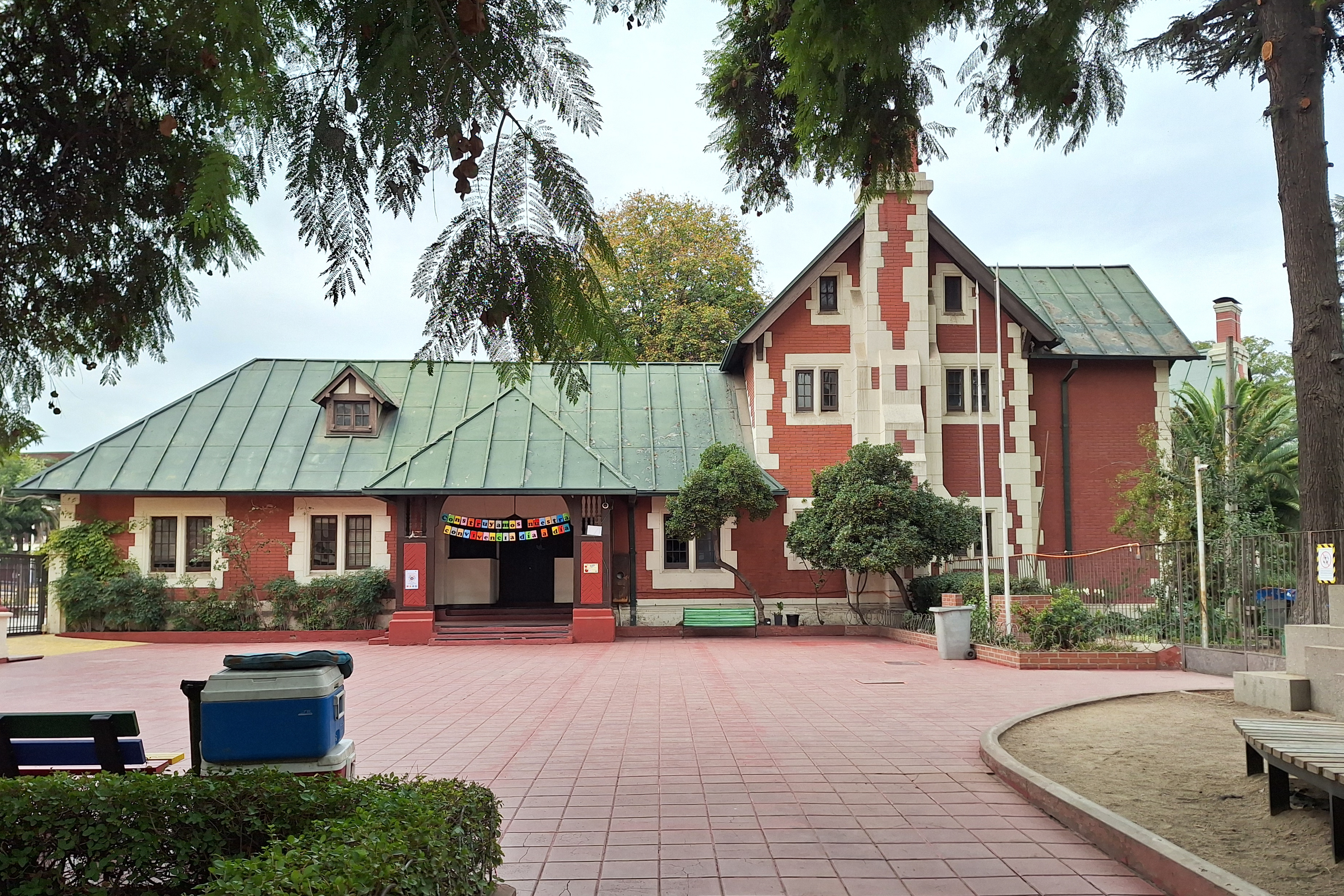
- Ñuñoa, Chile

Information
- Type: High school
- Established: 28 March 1932; 94 years ago
- Founder: Amanda Labarca
- Principal: Marcela Bornand Araya
- Website: https://www.lms.cl/

Liceo Manuel de Salas (English: Manuel de Salas High School) is a Chilean high school located in Santiago, Chile. It was established on the 28th of March 1932.

== Notable alumni ==
- Mireya Baltra, sociologist, journalist, and Communist Party politician
- Elsa Bolívar, painter and educator
- Cristian Heyne, composer and producer
- Adriana Hoffmann, botanist, environmentalist and author
- Pamela Jiles, journalist, writer, and Party of the People politician
- Marcos Libedinsky, judge
- Jorge Molina Valdivieso, lawyer, academic and Party for Democracy politician
- Romy Schmidt, lawyer, academic, researcher and politician

== Notable former teachers ==
- María Teresa López Boegeholz, oceanographer and academic
