= Rectangle Group =

Chilean artist group

The Rectangle Group (Spanish: Grupo Rectángulo) was a Chilean artist group active from 1955 until the early 1960s. The group was the first abstract-geometric and concrete art movement in Chile.

== History ==
The Rectangle Group was founded in 1955 (Note: Also cited as 1953.) by Luis Droguett, Gustavo Poblete Catalán, Ramón Vergara Grez and Waldo Vila at the Arts Faculty of the University of Chile. The group aimed to develop abstraction through the exploration of geometric forms, and to eliminate the referential link between art and reality.

In 1965 (Note: Also cited as 1961.), the groups successor the Form and Space Movement (Spanish: Movimiento Forma y Espacio) was founded.

== Members ==
=== Painters ===
- Elsa Bolívar
- Mario Carreño
- Ximena Cristi
- Luis Droguett
- Uwe Grumann
- Aurel Kessler
- Magdalena Lozano
- Matilde Pérez
- Maruja Pinedo
- Aída Poblete
- James Smith
- Waldo Vila
- Aixa Vicuña

=== Sculptors ===
- Carlos Alarcón
- Federico Assler
- Adolfo Berchenko
- Lorenzo Berg
- Sergio Berthoud
- Guillermo Brozalez
- Roberto Carmona
- Virginia Huneeus
- Isabel Sotomayor
