= Raquel Barros =

Chilean folklorist

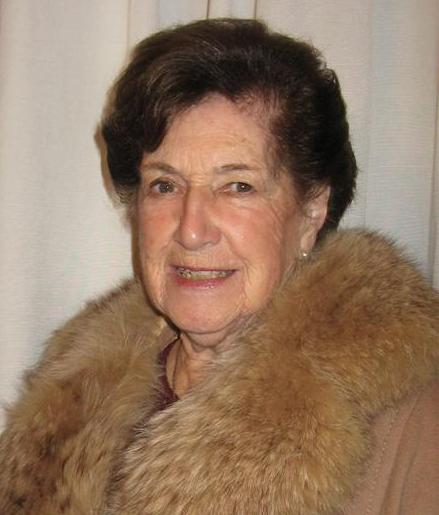
- 2009
- Born: Raquel Barros Aldunate; 2 December 1919; Santiago, Chile
- Died: 11 August 2014 (aged 94); Santiago, Chile
- Resting place: Parque del Recuerdo, Santiago
- Occupations: Folklorist, researcher

Raquel Barros Aldunate (2 December 1919 – 11 August 2014) was a Chilean folklorist noted for her studies and dissemination of Chilean folk music and dance.

== Biography ==
In 1952, Raquel Barros founded the Folkloric Association of Chile, of which she was the director for many years. This group, currently called the Raquel Barros Folkloric Group of Chile, is the country's oldest such group. Between 1958 and 1980, she was a researcher at the University of Chile at the Institute of Musical Research and then at the Music Department. Barros was vice-dean and assistant dean of the Faculty of Musical Sciences and Arts and Performance of that house of studies between 1974 and 1975. In 1973, she was the director of the National Folkloric Ballet.

Barros always combined research with folklore practice. Even at an advanced age, she worked on disseminating Chilean culture. At 82, she headed the cultural center of the municipality of Recoleta.

In 1996, she was appointed Corresponding Member of the Permanent International Folklore Commission, based in Buenos Aires, Argentina. In 2004, she was a member of the "FONDART" Project Qualification Commission of the National Council of Culture and the Arts.

Raquel Barros died at the Hospital del Salvador in Santiago on 11 August 2014 after suffering a fall at her home.

== Publications ==
Some of Barros's publications include:

- "El folklore de Chiloé", published by the National Secretariat of Women for the OAS meeting, Santiago, 1976 (with Manuel Dannemann)
- "La poesía folklórica de Melipilla", Revista Musical Chilena, No. 60, Santiago, 1958
- "La danza folklórica chilena – Investigación y enseñanza", Revista Musical Chilena, No. 71, Santiago, 1960
- "El guitarrón en el Depto. de Puente Alto", Revista Musical Chilena, No. 74, Santiago, 1960
- "Introducción al estudio de la tonada", Revista Musical Chilena, No. 109, Santiago, 1964
- Guía metodológica para el estudio del folklore chileno, Editorial Universitaria, Santiago, 1964
- La ruta de la Virgen de Palo Colorado, Santiago, 1966
- El romancero chileno, Santiago, 1970

In addition, Barros made numerous compilations of folk music that are on tapes in the Traditional Music Archive of the Faculty of Arts of the University of Chile.

== Honors ==
Raquel Barros received countless awards and recognitions for her work disseminating Chilean folklore in Chile and other countries. In 1992, she won a medal from the municipality of Santiago for her contribution to traditional Chilean culture; this municipality had already given her a medal in 1971 when the 20 years of the Chilean Folkloric Association were approaching. Several municipalities and other Chilean organizations have recognized her work, including the municipality of Talagante (1992), the Industrial Development Society (1993), the Council of Music (1996), the Ministry of Education (2000), the National Folklore Prize of the San Bernardo Festival (2000), and the Chilean Cueca Samuel Claro Valdés Award (2009).

In 2013, she received the Altazor Award in the Traditional Folklore – Researcher category.

In 2014, she received the Pablo Neruda Order of Artistic and Cultural Merit along with 11 other personalities from her country's artistic field.
