= Delia Domínguez =

Chilean poet (1931–2022)

- Born: Delia Domínguez Mohr; 11 August 1931; Osorno, Chile
- Died: 7 November 2022 (aged 91)
- Occupations: Poet, writer
- Notable work: El sol mira para atrás; Antología personal de poesía y prosa
- Awards: Pablo Neruda Order of Artistic and Cultural Merit (2005)

Delia Domínguez Mohr (11 August 1931 – 7 November 2022) was a Chilean poet, a member of her country's literary Generation of '50.

== Biography ==
A descendant of German settlers, Delia Domínguez lost her mother when she was five years old; Amalia Mohr died of tuberculosis in 1936. Her father, Luis Domínguez, a lawyer and judge, sent her and her brother Luis to boarding school. Delia studied at the Osorno School of German Nuns.

About her time as a schoolgirl, Domínguez remembered that she felt "very lonely, so much that I talked with dogs and horses."

I was a transgressive and insolent girl, so the nuns locked me in. During one of those punishments I read in the magazine Margarita about a national poetry contest called La uva for basic education students. I wrote a poem for it without knowing clearly what a poem was, and with that I won the first prize. From Santiago, the Ministry of Education sent a diploma to my school that was received in the rectory, from which they called me. There, the reverend mother said to me: "Hypocrite girl, why did you not tell me that you were a poet?" and she showed me the diploma of recognition. Such a wounded nun! Instead of congratulating me, she challenged me because I did not tell her that I had participated in that contest. From then on, when I was seven years old, she sarcastically called me the Neruda-Domínguez.

She studied law at the University of Chile, but in her third year she abandoned this and dedicated herself to managing the family farm, Santa Amelia de Tacamó in Osorno. During her student days she suffered her second great tragedy (after the death of her mother): at age 20 she lost the love of her life. Delia recalled:

I never wanted like that before him and I never wanted that way again. He took away, with his death, my love. I studied law in Santiago. He had a dairy in the south with a partner. We were together three years, already excited, with that little ring that precedes the final commitment. My father had come to see me and, that day, we went to the Crillón for tea. While they were attending to us, he passed me the paper – he did not know either. I opened it and saw the news: "Young man shot in Osorno." Four bullets hit him; he died instantly. The murderer was an ex-worker of his. That day a part of my joy went away. It was very brutal.

Domínguez has contributed to several publications, particularly Paula magazine, of which she was editor-in-chief and a literary critic. She has also been a host of some television art programs on Channel 9 of the University of Chile, and a panelist on the Radio Chilena program Carretera Cultural.

She was director of the Chilean Writers Society and its magazine, Alerce.

As a member of the Academia Chilena de la Lengua, she occupied its 4th chair on 25 May 1992. Her incorporation speech was titled Señales de una Poesía Mestiza en el Paralelo 40° Sur.

After her father died in 1970, she lived in the same house in the Santiago neighborhood of Providencia.

Her poems have been translated into several languages, particularly German and English. She has been nominated for the National Prize for Literature four times.

Her poetic work, as proposed by Juan Villegas, would correspond to a fusion between anti-poetry and poetry of the Lares, whose differentiating nuance is given by the absence and bitterness of anti-poetry and the magnification of the county space, in the case of laric poetry.

Pablo Neruda, her friend, said of her:

Understand that by nature, by ecological education, the poetry of Delia Domínguez, Osornina from the forests of Osorno, is bold and barefoot, knows how to walk without fear among thorns and pebbles, wade through torrents, bind animals, join the chorus of southern birds without submitting to the tremendous natural power to converse with sadness or love with all objects and beings. My wild friend raised among hazel trees and Antarctic ferns dominates the human relationship with the tenderness that acquired learning and defended herself from loneliness.

On 7 November 2022, Domínguez died at the age of 91.

== Awards and distinctions ==
- 1966 Pedro de Oña Municipal Award
- Illustrious daughter of the city of Osorno, 1992
- 1996 National Book Council Award
- 1999 Felipe Herrera Lane Foundation Award
- 2001 Universidad Mayor Award
- Finalist for the 2001 Altazor Award for Poetry for Huevos revueltos
- 2005 Pablo Neruda Order of Artistic and Cultural Merit

== Works ==
- Simbólico retorno, 1955
- La tierra nace al canto, 1958
- Obertura siglo XX, 1961
- Parlamentos del hombre claro, 1963
- Contracanto, 1968
- El sol mira para atrás, 1973
- Pido que vuelva mi ángel, 1982
- La gallina castellana y otros huevos, 1995
- Huevos revueltos, 2000
- Clavo de olor, 2004
- El sol mira para atrás. Antología personal de poesía y prosa, Catalonia, 2008; incorporates poems from other books
- Paralelo 40 Sur, anthology, with poems and unpublished stories, 2012
