= Abraham Freifeld =

Chilean-Romanian sculptor, professor and engineer (1921–2011)

- Born: Noua Suliță, Hotin County, Kingdom of Romania (now Ukraine); 1921
- Died: 22 November 2011 (aged 89–90); Santiago, Chile
- Other name: Abraham Freifeld Umanski
- Education: University of Chile, 1950
- Spouse: Ximena Cristi

Abraham Freifeld Umanski (Note: Also cited as Umanskaia.) (1921 – 22 November 2011) was a Chilean-Romanian sculptor, professor and engineer.

== Biography ==
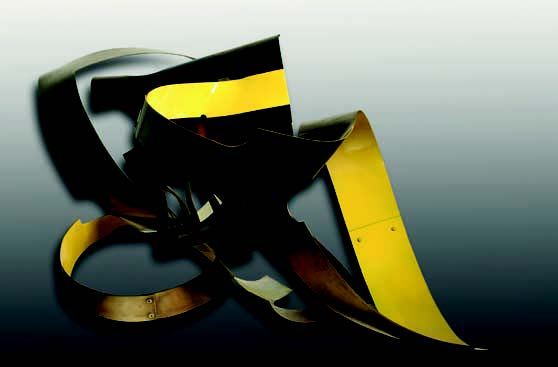
Abraham Freifeld (1992) TRAMPA PARA CAZAR ESPACIOS Nº 12

Freifeld was born in 1921 (Note: Also cited as 1922.) in Noua Suliță, Bessarabia (present-day Novoselytsia, Ukraine) to a Romanian-Jewish family. Fleeing Nazi persecution, Freifeld and his family arrived in Chile in 1939 (Note: Also cited as 1930.).

Freifeld attend the Liceo de Aplicación, before enrolling at the Engineering Faculty at the University of Chile. In 1942, Freifeld also enrolled at Arts Faculty of the University of Chile where he was a member of the Grupo de Estudiantes Plásticos.

Freifeld was an assistant to the sculptor Lily Garafulic. In 1960, Freifeld became a professor of sculpture at the Arts Faculty of the University of Chile. Freifeld was a professor at the Engineering Faculty of the University of Chile, and worked as an engineer for the Ministry of Public Works.

== Personal life ==
Freifeld was married to Ximena Cristi, a painter, educator and professor. Freifeld and Cristi had two sons.
