= Pablo Neruda Order of Artistic and Cultural Merit =

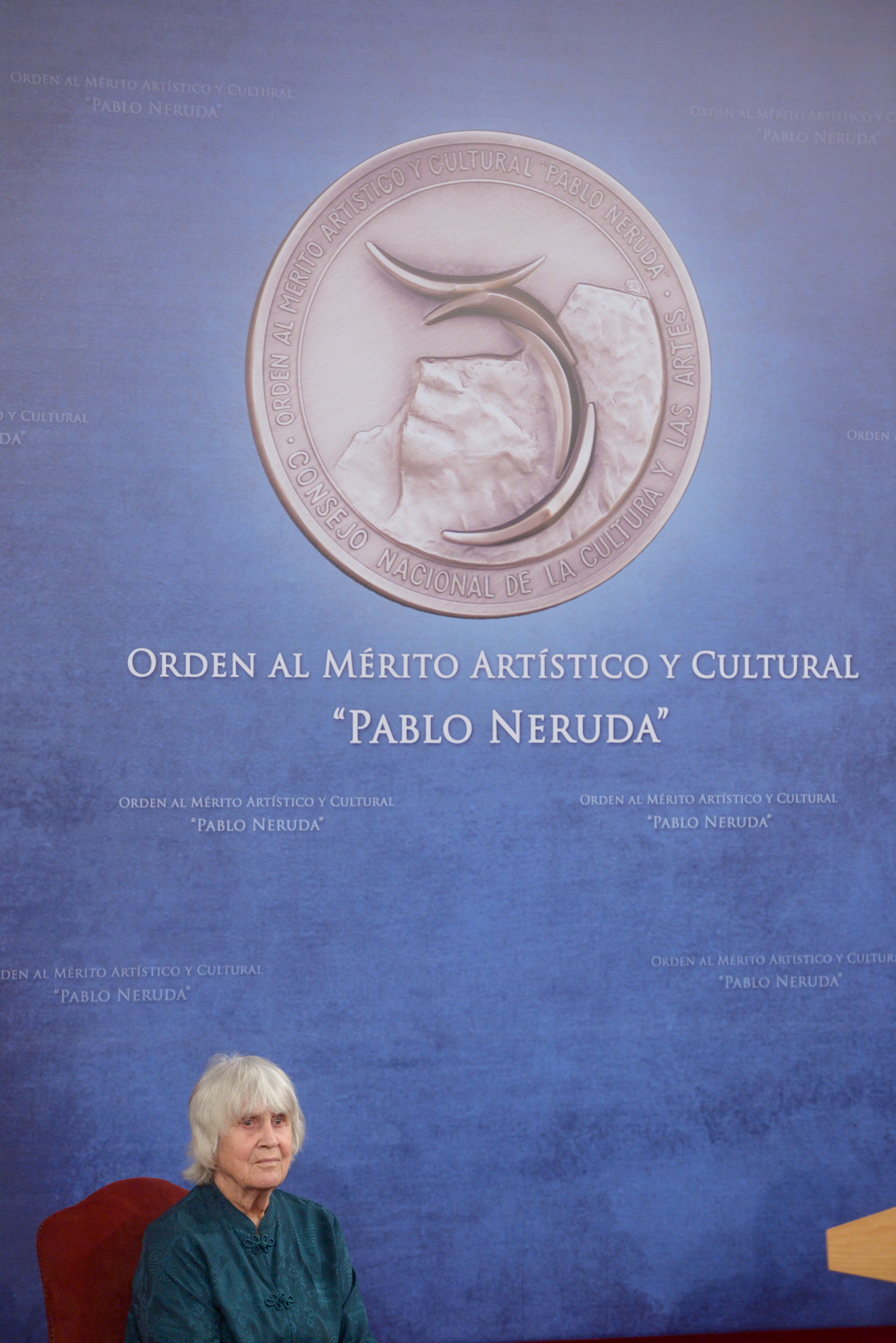
- Joan Turner at the 2016 award ceremony
- Awarded for: Contributions made in the field of art and culture
- Sponsored by: National Council of Culture and the Arts
- Country: Chile
- First award: 2004

The Pablo Neruda Order of Artistic and Cultural Merit (Spanish: Orden al Mérito Artístico y Cultural Pablo Neruda) was created in 2004 by the National Council of Culture and the Arts of the government of Chile, as part of the commemoration of the 100th anniversary of the birth of Chilean poet Pablo Neruda (12 July 1904).

It is granted by the Minister of Culture to those national and international figures who have stood out for contributions made in the field of art and culture.

The Pablo Neruda Order of Merit was awarded for the first time on 5 July 2004 to the mayor of Barcelona, Joan Clos, and about 15 Ibero-American artists—among them, Miguel Bosé, Joan Manuel Serrat, Víctor Manuel, Ana Belén, Jorge Drexler, Julieta Venegas, and Antonio Ríos—who participated in the Neruda en el corazón musical tribute that took place at the Palau Sant Jordi, Barcelona.

Many national and international personalities have received this decoration since it was created.

== Recipients ==
=== 2005 ===
- Carmen Beuchat, choreographer (5 March 2005 – International Women's Day)
- Isidora Aguirre, dramatist and writer (5 March 2005 – International Women's Day)
- María Elena Gertner, screenwriter, dramatist, and actress (5 March 2005 – International Women's Day)
- Roser Bru, visual artist (5 March 2005 – International Women's Day)
- Juan Luis Ysern de Arce, Bishop of Ancud (1 April 2005 – launch of Project SISMO)
- Roberto Parra, popular singer-songwriter; awarded to his widow Catalina Rojas (21 April 2005)
- Hernán Baldrich, dancer and choreographer (28 April 2005 – Day of the Dance)
- Tito Beltrán, Chilean tenor (25 July 2005)
- Patricio Bunster, choreographer (28 August 2005 – 2nd National Culture Convention)
- Tomás Chotzen, President of ANDES Foundation (28 August 2005 – 2nd National Culture Convention)
- Mariano Silva, film critic (28 August 2005 – 2nd National Culture Convention)
- Patricio Guzmán, filmmaker (31 August 2005 – Chilean premiere of documentary Salvador Allende)
- Carmen Brito, filmmaker and restorer (17 October 2005 – National Film Inauguration Day)
- Pedro Chaskel, film editor and director (17 October 2005 – National Film Inauguration Day)
- Sergio Bravo, filmmaker and documentalist (17 October 2005 – National Film Inauguration Day)
- Delia Domínguez, writer (14 December 2005 – Closing Quixote Reading Program)
- Marta Cruz-Coke, cultural manager (14 December 2005 – Closing Quixote Reading Program)
- Margot Loyola, folklorist (29 December 2005 – Valparaíso Cultural Carnival)

=== 2006 ===
- Bono (Paul David Hewson), U2 vocalist (26 February 2006 – La Moneda Palace)
- Alejandro Jodorowsky, writer and filmmaker (27 April 2006 – La Moneda Palace)
- Rubén Blades, musician and Minister of Tourism of Panama (27 December 2006 – La Moneda Palace)

=== 2007 ===
- Pina Bausch, German choreographer (11 January 2007 – La Moneda Palace)
- Luis Alarcón, Chilean actor (26 September 2007 – La Moneda Palace)
- Julio Bocca, Argentine dancer (24 November 2007 – La Moneda Palace)
- Leo Brouwer, Cuban composer and musician (1 December 2007 – La Moneda Palace)

=== 2008 ===
- Ennio Morricone, Italian film score composer (19 March 2008 – La Moneda Palace)

=== 2009 ===
- Isaac Frenkel, benefactor of music in Chile, ex-President of the Beethoven Foundation (27 August 2009 – La Moneda Palace)

=== 2010 ===
- Laura Esquivel, Mexican writer (21 January 2010 – La Moneda Palace)
- Cristina Gallardo-Domâs, lyrical singer (23 September 2010 – Los Angeles Opera Theater, California)
- Plácido Domingo, Spanish singer and opera director (23 September 2010 – Los Angeles Opera Theater, California)
- Daniel Catán, Mexican composer and musician (23 September 2010 – Los Angeles Opera Theater, California)
- Antonio Skármeta, writer (23 September 2010 – Los Angeles Opera Theater, California)

=== 2012 ===
- Miguel Castillo Didier, scholar of Greek culture (27 March 2014 – Sala América, Biblioteca Nacional)
- Lucho Gatica, singer (25 November 2012 – Chile Pavilion at the Guadalajara Book Fair, Mexico)

=== 2013 ===
- Los Jaivas, experimental rock band (30 September 2013 - Muelle Prat, Valparaíso)

=== 2014 ===
- Raquel Barros, folklorist, researcher, and academic (30 January 2014 - Severín Library, Valparaíso)
- Matilde Pérez, visual artist (30 January 2014 - Severín Library, Valparaíso)
- Paz Errázuriz, photographer (30 January 2014 - Severín Library, Valparaíso)
- Alejandro Sieveking, dramatist (30 January 2014 - Severín Library, Valparaíso)
- Luis Cárdenas, circus trapeze artist (30 January 2014 - Severín Library, Valparaíso)
- Themo Lobos, writer; posthumous decoration (30 January 2014 - Severín Library, Valparaíso)
- Cuarteto Latinoamericano, musical group (30 January 2014 - Severín Library, Valparaíso)
- Fernando Garcia, learned music composer (30 January 2014 - Severín Library, Valparaíso)
- Gabriel Valdés, diplomat and politician; posthumous decoration (30 January 2014 - Severín Library, Valparaíso)
- Los Blue Splendor, musical group (30 January 2014 - Severín Library, Valparaíso)
- Arturo Navarro, manager of the Mapocho Station Cultural Center (30 January 2014 - Severín Library, Valparaíso)
- Nicola Schiess, executive director of the Teatro del Lago, Frutillar (30 January 2014 - Severín Library, Valparaíso)

=== 2015 ===
- Quino, Argentine writer and cartoonist of Mafalda (15 January 2015 - Gabriela Mistral Cultural Center)

=== 2016 ===
- Valentín Trujillo, Chilean musician
- Vicente Bianchi, Chilean musician
- Bélgica Castro, Chilean actress
- Claudio di Girolamo, Chilean painter, dramatist, and cultural advisor
- Alicia del Carmen Cáceres, Chilean goldsmith
- Joan Turner, Chilean-British dancer

=== 2017 ===
- Jorge González, Chilean musician, singer, and composer; leader of the band Los Prisioneros (7 January 2017 - Summit of Chilean Rock, Estadio Nacional)
- Humberto Duvauchelle, Chilean actor and academic (11 July 2017 - University of Concepción Theater)
- Juan Allende-Blin, composer (9 September 2017 - University of Chile Theater)

=== 2018 ===
- Mauricio Celedón, Chilean theater director
- Mario Vargas Llosa, Peruvian writer, politician, and college professor
- Gustavo Dudamel, Venezuelan conductor and violinist

=== 2021 ===
- Sylvia Soublette, Chilean composer

=== 2024 ===
- André Rieu, dutch violinist, director and composer.

=== 2026 ===
- Marina Latorre, chilean writer, journalist and gallerist.
- Ana Reeves, chilean television, film and theatre actress, teacher and director.
- Osvaldo Cádiz, chilean music researcher and teacher.
- Anabella Roldán, chilean classical dancer and teacher.

== See also ==
- Pablo Neruda Award, granted by the Neruda Foundation to poets under 40
- Pablo Neruda Ibero-American Poetry Award, also given by the CNCA
