= Ximena Cristi =

Chilean painter (1920–2022)

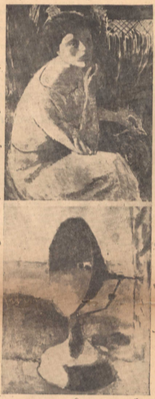
- Cristi and her work, as featured in Revista Pro Arte in 1954.
- Born: Lucía Ximena Cristi Moreno; 13 December 1920; Rancagua, Chile
- Died: 21 July 2022 (aged 101); Santiago, Chile
- Education: University of Chile, 1945; Accademia di Belle Arti di Roma, 1952
- Occupations: Painter; educator; Professor
- Spouse: Abraham Freifeld (died 2011)
- Children: 2

Lucía Ximena Cristi Moreno (13 December 1920 – 21 July 2022) was a Chilean painter, educator and professor. A representative of the Chilean Generation of '40 (Spanish: Generación del Cuarenta), Moreno was a co-founder of the Group of Five (Spanish: Grupo de los cinco).

== Biography ==
Cristi was born on 13 December 1920 in Rancagua. For six years beginning in 1939 she studied at the Arts Faculty at the University of Chile, majoring in painting and graduating with a bachelor's in visual arts. While at the university she studied under the painter Jorge Caballero, who influenced her artistic development.

Cristi became part of the "generación de 1940" ("generation of 1940"), an artistic movement in Chile that also included Francisco Otta, Israel Roa, Aída Poblete, Ernesto Barreda, and Carlos Pedraza. This group, which was influenced by the likes of Pablo Burchard, Camilo Mori, and Luis Oyarzún, practiced a style similar to fauvism.

Later on, thanks to a scholarship from the Italian government, Cristi traveled to Italy to study at the Accademia di Belle Arti di Roma from 1948 to 1952.

In 1953, she joined with Matilde Pérez, Aída Poblete, Sergio Montecinos, and Ramón Vergara to form the "Grupo de los cinco" ("Group of Five"). This group, which stemmed from a joint exhibition that the artists staged at the Chilean-French Cultural Institute, reflected an inconformity with the traditional mediums of pictorial representation. They dedicated themselves to experimenting with new ways of artistic creativity. While they did not all work in a cohesive style, the five artists shared similar ideas about the reality of the painting, which they saw as corresponding to a balance of forms rather than to visual reality.

She was also a member of the Rectangle Group (Spanish: Grupo Rectángulo) alongside Gustavo Poblete, Ramón Vergara Grez, Matilde Pérez, Elsa Bolívar, Maruja Pinedo, and Uwe Grumann. The group's members based their work on geometric and abstract forms, and they maintained that "art is an art of ideas."

Cristi also taught art, including as a professor of painting at her alma mater, the University of Chile, from 1960 to 1982.

In 2020, to mark her 100th birthday, the Chilean undersecretary of culture and art launched a project to research and study the work of Ximena Cristi, which culminated in the publication of a book titled Catálogo de obra razonada ("Catalog of Reasoned Work") in 2022.

== Work ==
According to Cristi, her inspiration always came from nature: "If I have a still life, a chair, an object, or a tree, it's very objective, very real, born from there." While she applied her personal vision to her paintings, she acknowledged that she never painted from her imagination, always using something objective as her guide. Her work is primarily based on interiors, gardens, still lives, and human figures. Some of her signature works can be found at the Chilean National Museum of Fine Arts, including Jugadores de rugby, El árbol del jardín, and Sillón de espaldas. Other works are featured at the Casa del Arte, Museum of Visual Arts, and various other museums and private collections.

Among more than a dozen awards received throughout her career are, notably, the Altazor Award in 2011 and the Pablo Neruda Order of Artistic and Cultural Merit in 2022.

== Personal life ==
Cristi was married to Abraham Freifeld, a Chilean-Romanian sculptor, professor and engineer. Cristi and Freifeld had two sons.

On 21 July 2022 Cristi died in Santiago, aged 101.
