= Aída Poblete =

Chilean painter, printmaker and professor (1914–2000)

- Born: Aída Poblete del Solar; 16 April 1914; Temuco, Chile
- Died: 23 September 2000 (aged 86); Santiago, Chile
- Education: University of Chile, 1945; Pontifical Catholic University of Chile
- Occupations: Painter; printmaker; professor
- Movement: Generation of '40; Group of Five; Rectangle Group

Aída Poblete del Solar (16 April 1914 (Note: Also cited as 1916.) – 23 September 2000) was a Chilean painter, printmaker and professor. A representative of the Chilean Generation of '40 (Spanish: Generación del Cuarenta), Poblete played a key role in the development of abstract art in Chile.

== Early life and education ==
Poblete was born on 16 April 1914 in Temuco. From 1938 to 1945, Vicuña studied at the Arts Faculty of the University of Chile where she was student of Pablo Burchard. Poblete later studied engraving under Eduardo Vilches at the Pontifical Catholic University of Chile.

In Argentina Poblete studied under Julio E. Payró and Jorge Romero Brest.

== Career ==
Poblete belonged to the Generation of '40 group of Chilean painters. In 1951, Poblete exhibited at the 1st Hispano-American Art Biennial in Madrid.

In 1953, Poblete co-founded of the Group of Five (Spanish: Grupo de los cinco) along with Matilde Pérez, Ximena Cristi, Sergio Montecinos and Ramón Vergara. The group aimed to move away from traditional figurative representation and held an exhibition at the Instituto Chileno-Francés de Cultura in Santiago.

In 1955, Poblete joined the Rectangle Group (Spanish: Grupo Rectángulo), which rejected figurative art and explored abstraction through the use of geometric forms.

Poblete's work is known to have been influenced conceptually by Emilio Pettoruti.

=== Academia ===
Poblete first worked as an assistant professor on the introductory course to painting and drawing at the Arts Faculty of the University of Chile. Poblete later worked as assistant professor and lecturer in commercial art, before becoming a professor of drawing. In 1976, Poblete retired from teaching in order to concentrate on her artistic practice.

== Personal life ==
On 23 September 2000 Poblete died in Santiago, aged 86.
