= María Teresa López Boegeholz =

Chilean oceanographer (1927–2006)

María Teresa López Boegeholz (August 1, 1927 – June 6, 2006) was a Chilean oceanographer and academic. She was considered a pioneer in the field of marine sciences.

== Early life and education ==
Boegeholz was born on August 1, 1927 in La Unión. She moved to Santiago in 1948 and studied biology and chemistry at the Instituto Pedagógico de la Universidad de Chile.

== Career ==
In 1952, she began working as a teaching assistant at the Liceo Manuel de Salas. She subsequently worked as a researcher at the Instituto Pedagógico and at the Centro de Investigaciones Zoológicas. In 1966, she became a professor of zoology at the Pontifical Catholic University of Chile. During this period, her interest was mainly focused on organisms in aquatic environments.

From 1966 to 1998, when she retired, she was professor at the University of Concepción; she taught courses on ecology, aquaculture, socioecology, women and the environment, marine biology and sustainable development. She was involved with aquaculture and ecologic projects in the Chiloé Archipelago in cooperation with the Instituto de Fomento Pesquero, the Agriculture and Livestock Service of Chile and the Austral University of Chile. She also organized seminars and workshops for the Food and Agriculture Organization of the United Nations and advised the Confederación Nacional de Pescadores Artesanales de Chile (a national artisanal fishing organization). Boegeholz helped support the participation of women in artisanal fishing.

In 2005, she earned a diploma in gerontology for professionals from the Pontifical Catholic University of Chile with the aim of helping to prevent the elderly from being marginalized.

== Death ==
She died in Valdivia on June 6, 2006, after a long illness, at the age of 78.
