= Julieta Campusano =

Chilean politician

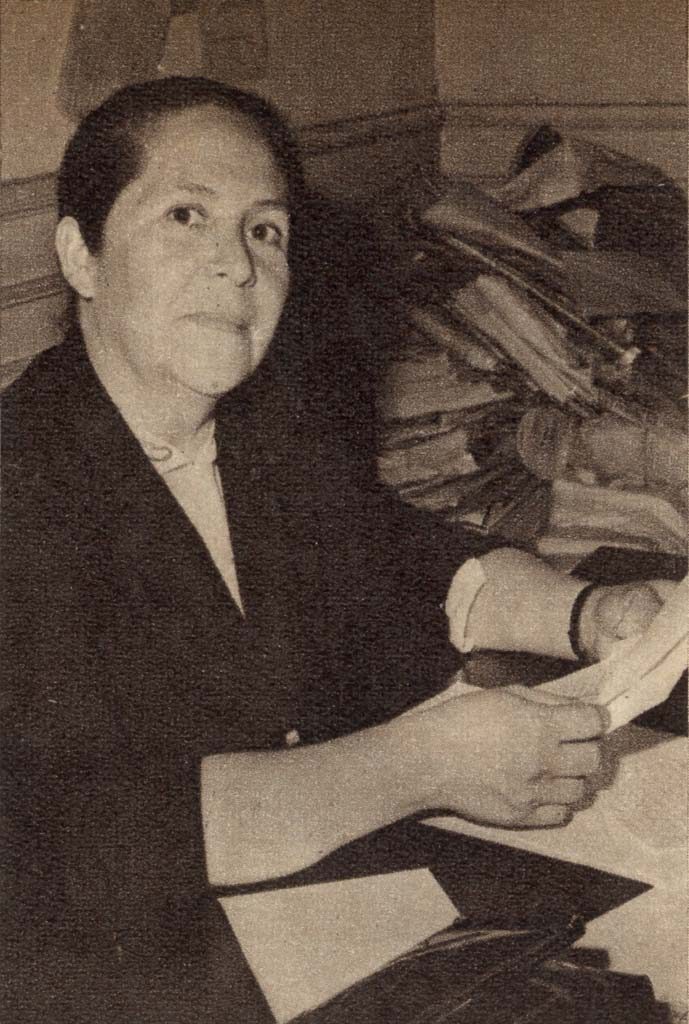

Julieta Campusano (31 May 1918, Coquimbo – 11 June 1991) was a Chilean politician, belonging to the Communist Party of Chile. Campusano was a member of the Central Committee of the Communist Party.

In 1944 the Chilean Federation of Women's Institution (FECHIF) was founded, with Campusano as one of its leaders. In 1947, Campusano was elected municipal councilor in Santiago de Chile.

Campusano went into exile after the September 11, 1973 coup d'état. In the 1980s she returned to Chile, but was arrested. In May 1987, she was sentenced to banishment to Sierra Gorda in northern Chile. She died of cancer in 1991.
