= Mario Iriarte =

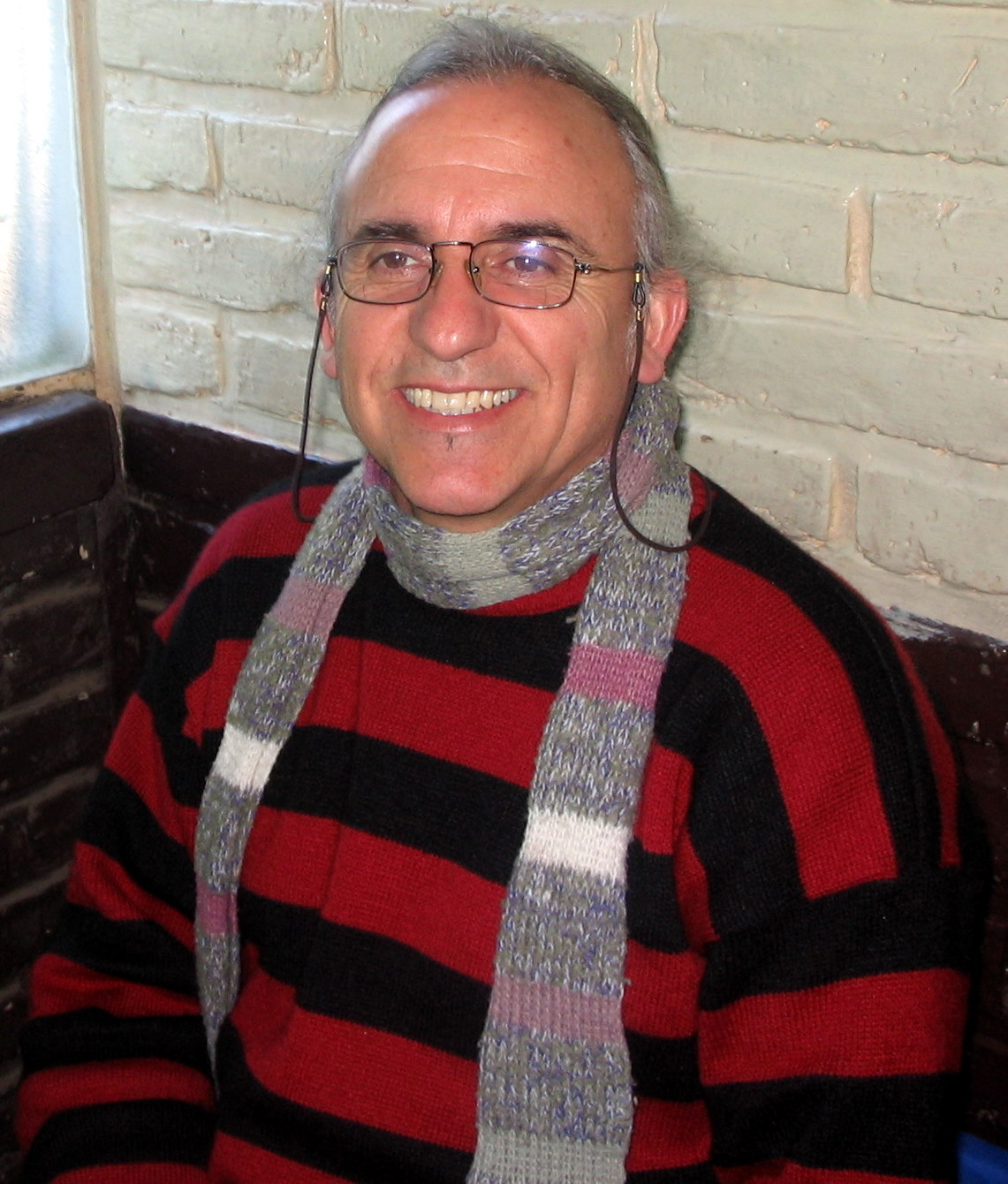
- Iriarte in 2009.

Background information
- Born: August 18, 1955 (age 70)
- Origin: Santa Cruz, Chile
- Genres: Folk, singer-songwriter, Latin music, Chilean music, cueca
- Occupation(s): Vocalist, songwriter, teacher
- Instrument(s): Vocals, guitar, piano
- Years active: 1982–present

Mario Antonio Iriarte Donoso (born August 8, 1955) is a Chilean musician, singer, songwriter and teacher, originary from Santa Cruz.

== Life ==
Iriarte completed his Musical Arts studies in the University of Chile in 1986. He has since worked since as a teacher in Liceo Santa Cruz.

In 2004 and 2008, he was part of the jury of the National Competition of Unpublished Cueca Compositions in Santa Cruz (Spanish: Concurso Nacional de Composiciones Inéditas de Cueca en Santa Cruz).

Iriarte is also a member of the Sociedad Chilena del Derecho de Autor (Chilean Copyright Society, SCD).

== Reír o Llorar ==
Reír o Llorar

Studio album by Mario Iriarte
- Released: 2008
- Recorded: 2008
- Genre: Rock, pop music
- Label: Palma
- Producer: Cristián Palma V. and Manolo Palma

In 2008, Iriarte released a self-composed album called Reír o Llorar (To Laugh or To Cry) under the label Palma Records. Iriarte reportedly collaborated with Chilean New Wave artist Luis Dimas during the album production.

=== Track listing ===
1. "Egoístamente Mía"
2. "Llora Corazón"
3. "De Tanto Amarte"
4. "No Quiero Volver"
5. "Amiga es Mi Dolor"
6. "Volveré a Encontrar"
7. "Mi Enemiga"
8. "Si te Vas de Mí"
9. "Me Duele el Corazón"
10. "Amor No Soy Feliz"
11. "Mi Estupidez"
12. "Reír o Llorar"

All tracks written and composed by Mario Iriarte.

=== Personnel ===
- Mario Iriarte – lead vocals
- Cristián Palma V. – drums, bass guitar, conga, minor percussion; record producer, arrangements (all tracks but 1–2, and 5), sequential production, and planning
- Manolo Palma – organ; executive producer, arrangements (track 1–2)
- Jorge Seguel – acoustic guitar; arrangements (track 5)
- Leslie Moraga – electric guitar
- Álvaro Rivera G. – graphic artist.
- Andrés Rebolledo – bongo drums; recording and mixing engineer
