= Federico Assler =

Chilean sculptor

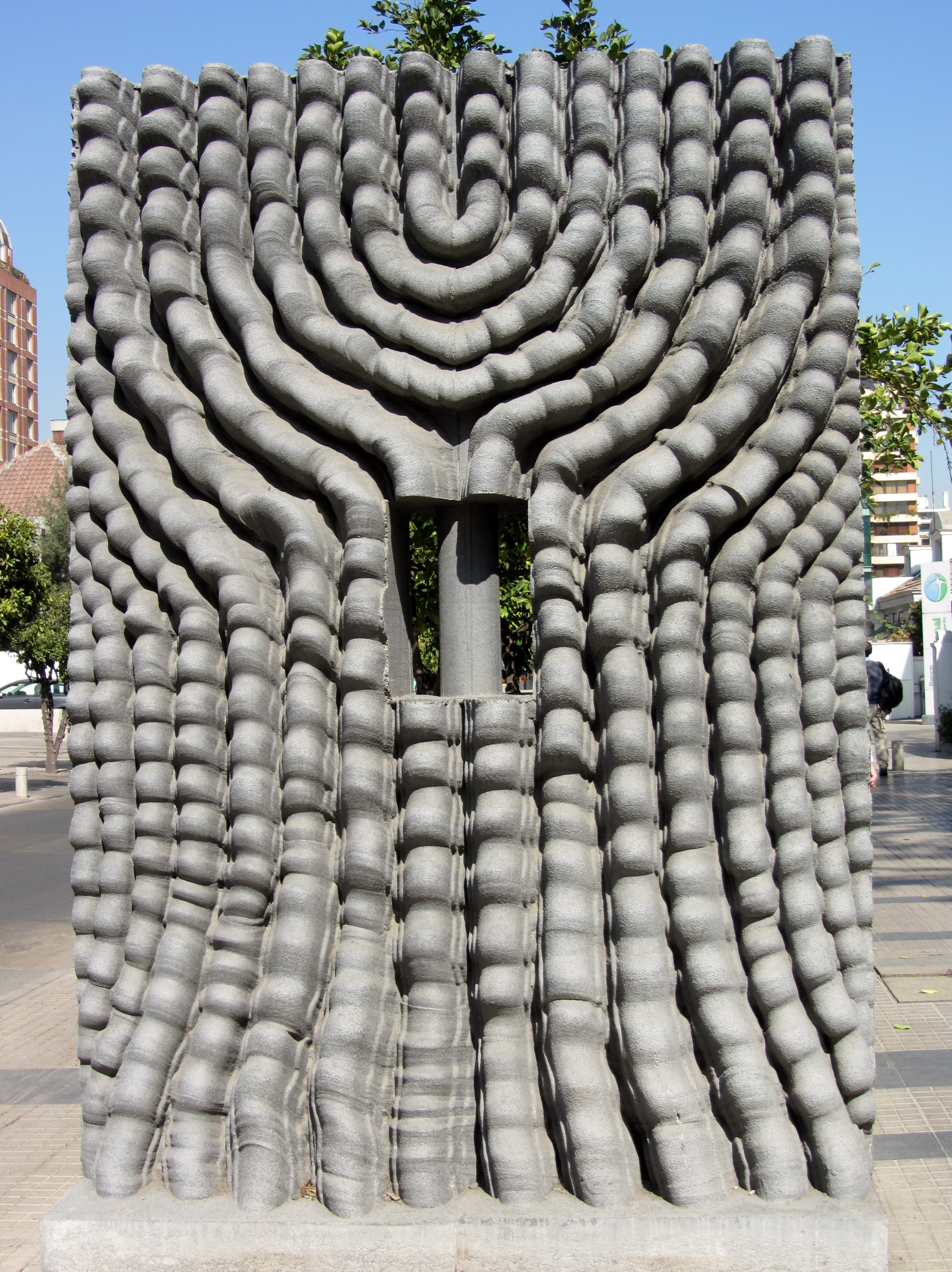
- Doble relieve y columna, artwork by Assler
- Born: April 24, 1929; Santiago, Chile
- Education: University of Chile
- Occupation: Sculptor
- Awards: National Prize for Plastic Arts (2009); Altazor Award (2004, 2005, 2010)

Federico Assler is a Chilean sculptor known for his public monuments. He received Chile's National Prize for Plastic Arts in 2009.

== Biography ==
In 1954, he enrolled in the School of Architecture at the Pontifical Catholic University of Valparaíso, where he stayed for two years; later, he would join the School of Fine Arts in Viña del Mar. His initial works were connected to painting, but his interest in representing volume led him towards sculpture. Alongside Raúl Valdivieso, Sergio Mallol, Sergio Castillo Mandiola, and others, he became part of the so-called Generation of Fifty, a group of sculptors known for their experimentation with new techniques and materials. He also was a member of the Rectangle Group (Spanish: Grupo Rectángulo).

On August 24, 2009, Assler was awarded the National Prize for Visual Arts in Chile. Moreover, he has also been honored with the Altazor Prize for National Arts three times: in 2004, 2005, and 2010.

== Artwork ==
In his early pieces, Assler created cut-out templates on particleboard, which, when repeated with gradual enlargements and glued together, formed volumes with a stepped texture and various shapes. However, his desire for sculptures to relate to humans and nature in outdoor settings led him to use concrete in his works. This material, known for its greater durability, predominates in his artistic career. To achieve this, he creates molds from expanded polystyrene, commonly referred to as "plumavit" or "aislapol" in Chile, into which he later pours the concrete mixture.

== Gallery ==
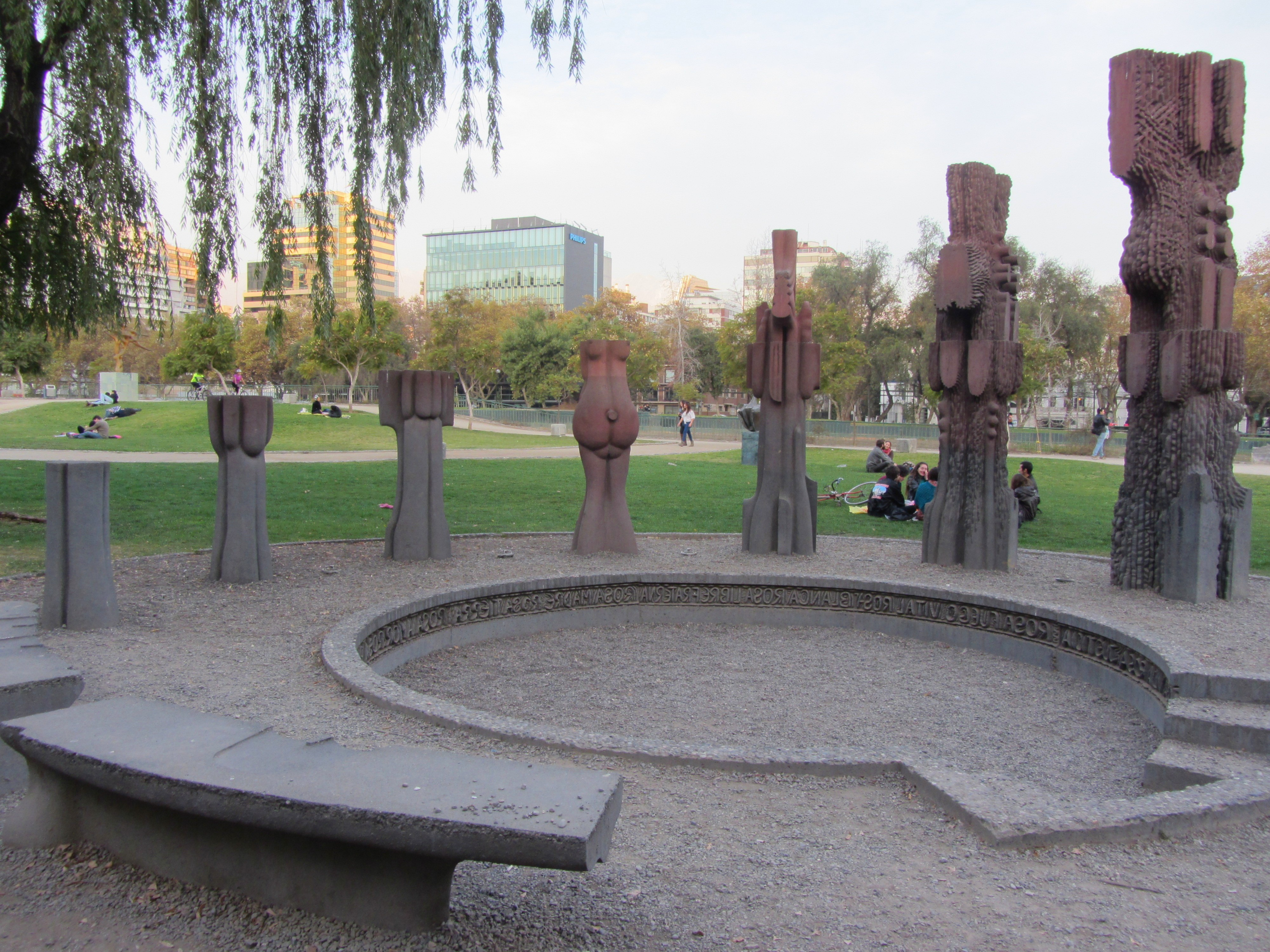
Conjunto escultórico in Parque de las Esculturas, Santiago.

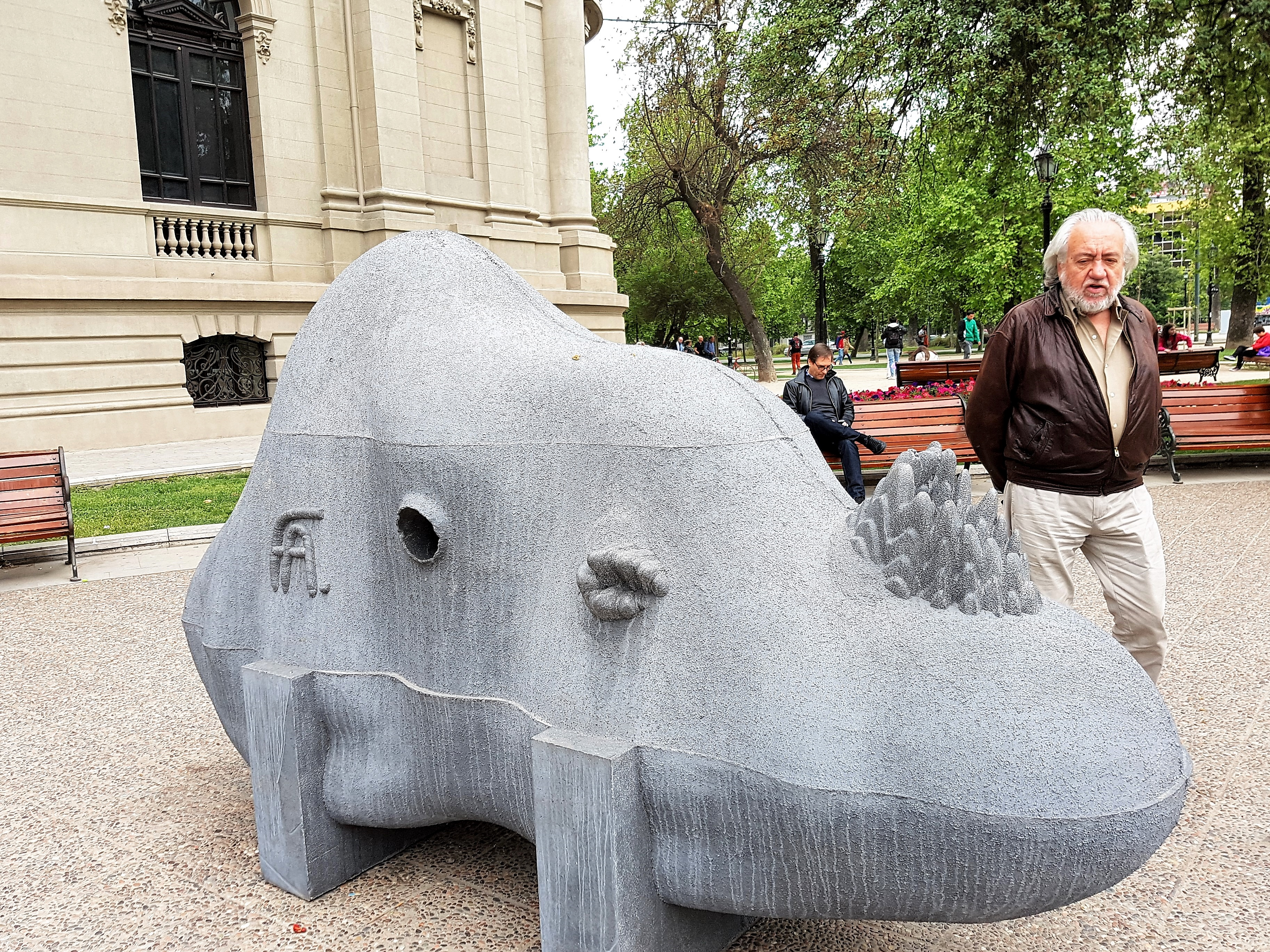
Patata in Chilean National Museum of Fine Arts

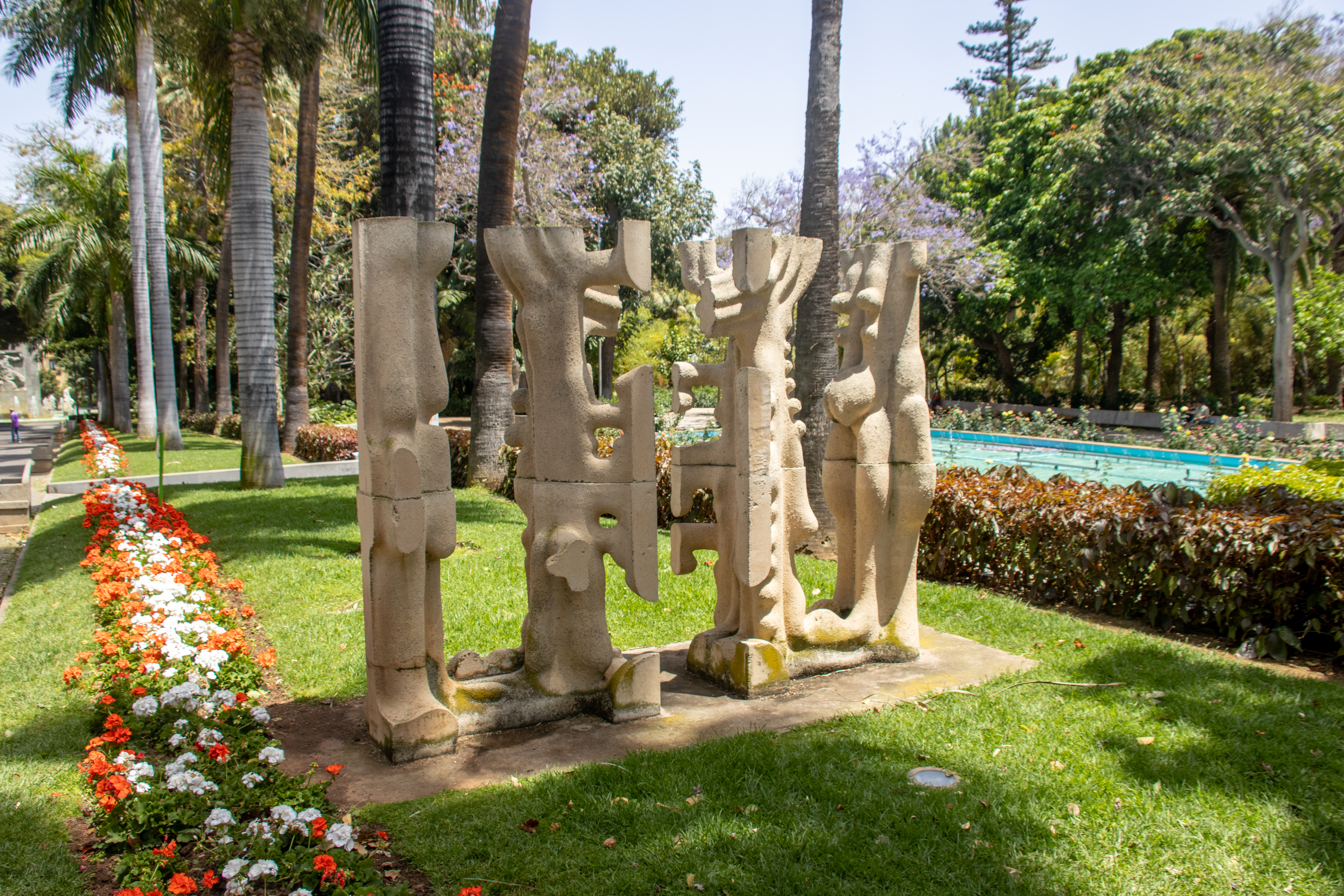
Sculpture in I Exposición Internacional de Escultura en la Calle, Spain

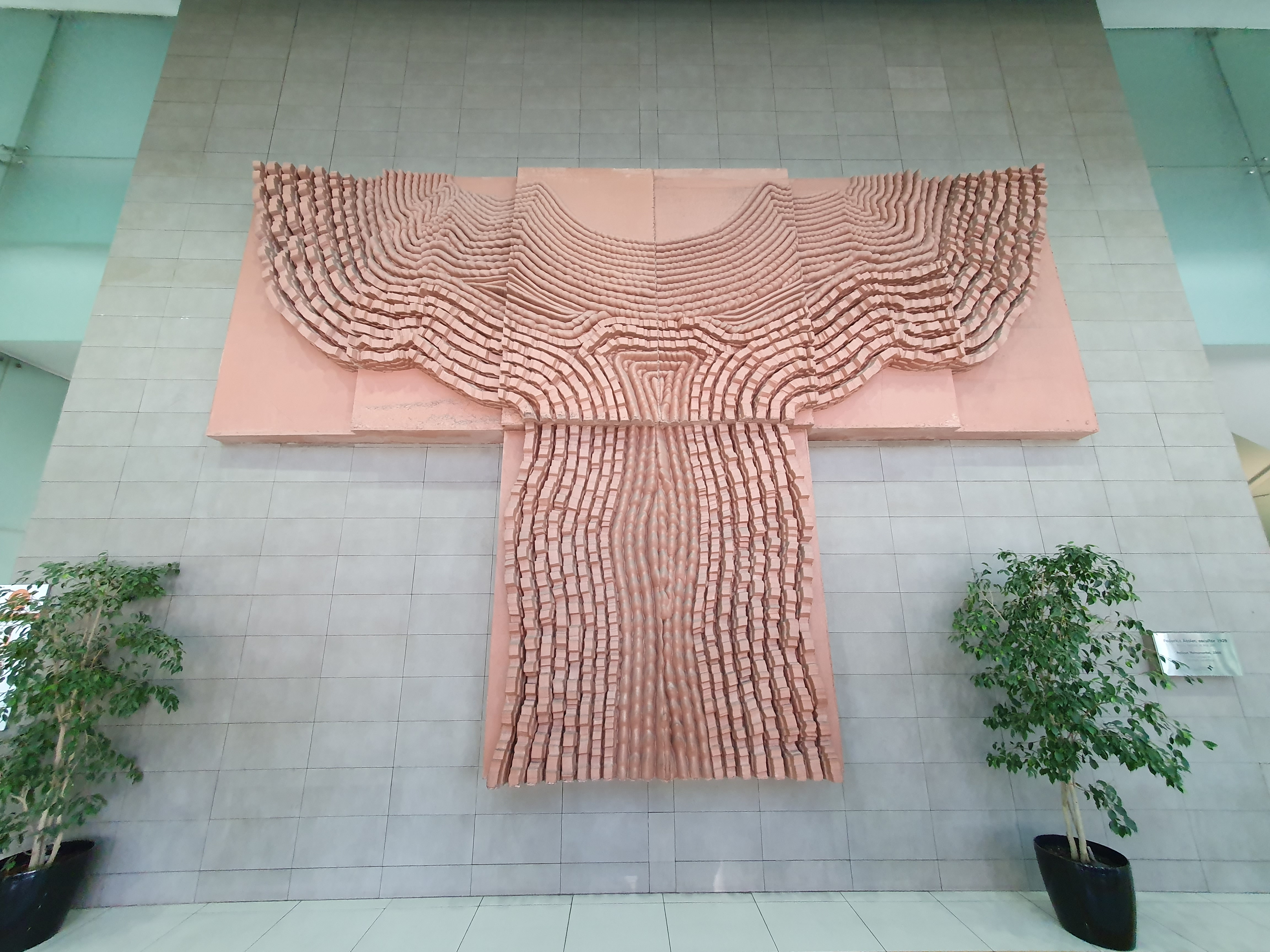
Relieve monumental, public monument in Santiago.
