= Cristina Dorador =

Chilean microbiologist, former constituent assembly member

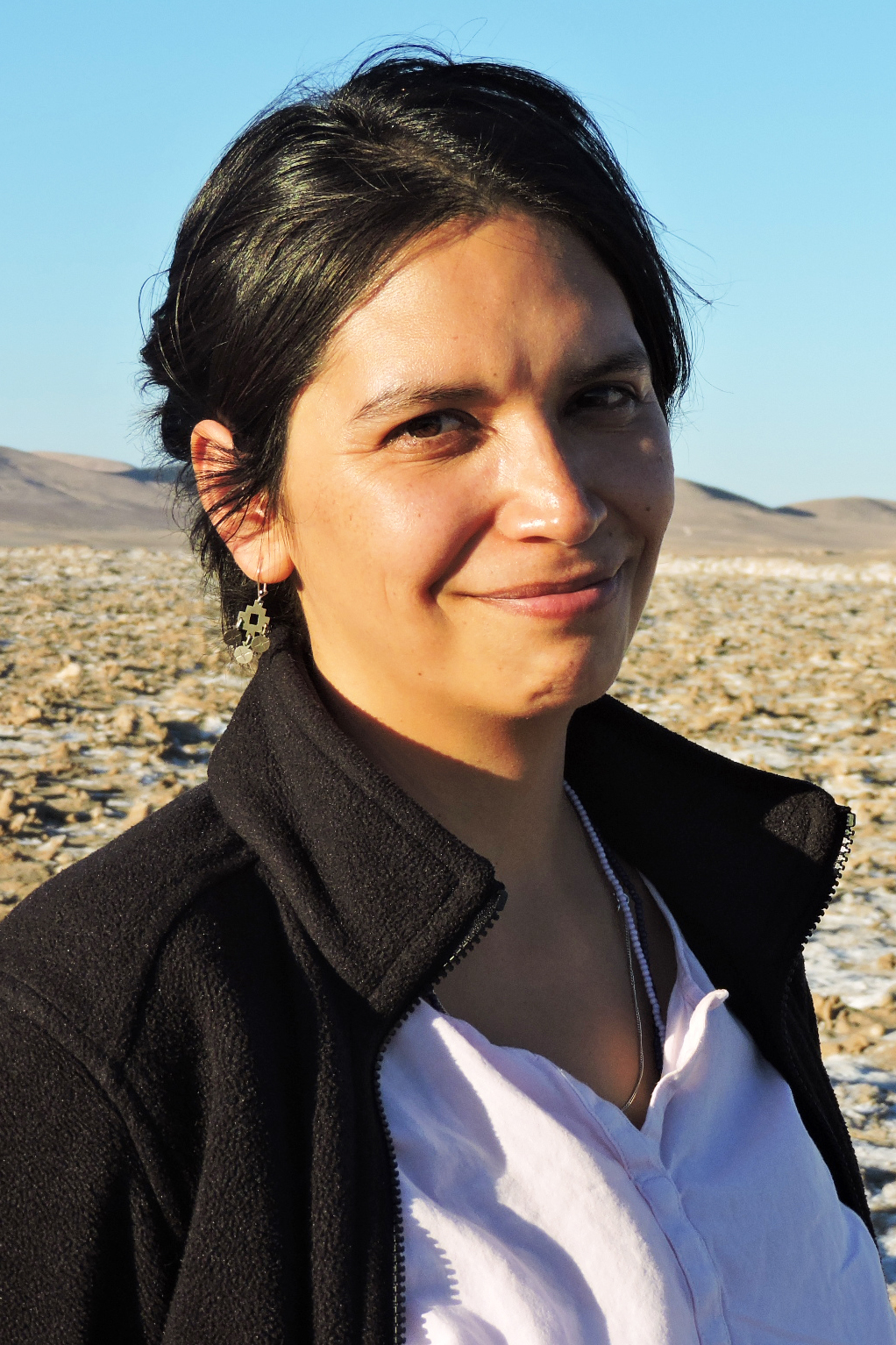

Member of the Constitutional Convention
- In office 4 July 2021 – 4 July 2022
- Preceded by: Office established
- Constituency: 3rd District

Personal details
- Born: Cristina Dorador Ortiz; 28 February 1980 (age 46) Antofagasta, Chile
- Education: University of Chile; Max Planck Institute
- Occupation: Scientist

Cristina Dorador Ortiz (born February 28, 1980, in Antofagasta) is a Chilean scientist, doctor, and former assembly member of the Chilean Constitutional Convention who conducts research in microbiology, microbial ecology, limnology and geomicrobiology. She is also an associate professor in the department of biotechnology of the Faculty of Marine Sciences and Natural Resources at the University of Antofagasta.

She coordinates in Chile of the Extreme Environment Network for the study of ecosystems in the geographical extremes of Chile and has developed biotechnological tools to value the unique properties of some highland microbial communities such as resistance to ultraviolet radiation for elaborate cosmetic creams, joining the field of cosmetic biotechnology. She has also led the development of textile material using the photoprotective properties of highland bacteria.

She was a member of the transition council of the National Commission for Scientific and Technological Research in 2019 that gave rise to the National Agency for Research and Development of Chile, and has been recognized nationally and internationally as one of the most relevant researchers in Chile.

From July 2021 to July 2022, she served as a conventional constituent for District 3, which represents the Antofagasta Region.

== Biography ==
Cristina Dorador was born in Antofagasta in 1980, where she spent her childhood and completed her primary and secondary studies. She later obtained her degree in biology from the Faculty of Sciences at the University of Chile in Santiago. She then did a Ph.D. at the University of Kiel in Germany and the Max Planck Institute for Limnology in Plön and obtained a job at the University of Antofagasta.

She is the daughter of teacher and poet Wilfredo Dorador and Milena Ortiz, also a teacher. She formed her family with the English researcher Chris Harrod with whom she has two children.

== Education and scientific activities ==
Dorador is a biologist from the University of Chile. She subsequently obtained her Ph.D. in Natural Sciences with a minor in microbiology at the Christian-Albrechts Universität zu Kiel in Kiel, Germany in 2007.

She has studied ecosystems of the highland salt flats system, investigating the importance of microbes for the extreme systems of the Atacama Desert.

Dorador has described the ability of bacteria to degrade synthetic compounds such as polyesters and plastics. She has also highlighted the microbial diversity at high altitudes and the properties that make them resistant to extreme conditions. The microbial activity of salt flats in northern Chile is today a relevant issue for the biological heritage of Chile thanks to the field studies carried out by Dorador and her team in the last 10 years.

=== Scientific dissemination ===
She has been a scientific advisor to the PAR Explora Antofagasta program of the National Commission for Scientific and Technological Research and participated in other dissemination bodies such as Puerto de Ideas, Congreso Futuro and TEDx. In parallel, she is a columnist in the Chilean scientific dissemination blog Ethylmercury. She is a member of the Asociación Red de Investigadoras.

== Politics ==
She was registered as an independent candidate in the 2021 conventional constituent elections for district 3 (Calama, María Elena, Ollagüe, San Pedro de Atacama, Tocopilla, Antofagasta, Mejillones, Sierra Gorda and Taltal), forming part of the independent movement of the north. She was elected with 12.68% of the votes, reaching the first majority of the district.

== Awards and distinctions ==
Dorador is a member of the international panel of the international society for microbial ecology. and she was a member of the transition council of the National Commission for Scientific and Technological Research in 2019 that gave rise to the National Research and Development Agency of Chile.

According to the report "Ciencias Imagen Chile" developed by Marca Chile in 2018, Dorador is among the most prominent Chilean researchers in international media. She was also chosen in 2017 as one of the 100 leading women in the country by El Mercurio.

Her commitment to the communities of northern Chile was reflected in the laboratory that bears her name at the Liceo Radomiro Tomic in Calama. Cristina was the representative of Chile as a young scientist in the book “Young Scientists. A bright future for the Americas," published by the InterAmerican Network of Academies of Sciences.

== Selected publications ==
- Junier, Pilar; Molina, Verónica; Dorador, Cristina; Hadas, Ora; Kim, Ok-Sun; Junier, Thomas; Witzel, Karl-Paul; Imhoff, Johannes F. (January 2010). "Phylogenetic and functional marker genes to study ammonia-oxidizing microorganisms (AOM) in the environment". Applied Microbiology and Biotechnology. 85 (3): 425–440. doi:10.1007/s00253-009-2228-9. ISSN 0175-7598. PMC 2802487. PMID 19830422.
- Dorador, Cristina; Meneses, Daniela; Urtuvia, Viviana; Demergasso, Cecilia; Vila, Irma; Witzel, Karl-Paul; Imhoff, Johannes F. (June 2009). "Diversity of Bacteroidetes in high-altitude saline evaporitic basins in northern Chile". Journal of Geophysical Research: Biogeosciences. 114 (G2): n/a. Bibcode:2009JGRG..114.0D05D. doi:10.1029/2008JG000837.
- Dorador, Cristina; Vila, Irma; Imhoff, Johannes F.; Witzel, Karl-Paul (15 April 2008). "Cyanobacterial diversity in Salar de Huasco, a high altitude saline wetland in northern Chile: an example of geographical dispersion?: Cyanobacteria in Salar de Huasco". FEMS Microbiology Ecology. 64 (3): 419–432. doi:10.1111/j.1574-6941.2008.00483.x. PMID 18410357.
- Dorador, Cristina; Vila, Irma; Remonsellez, Francisco; Imhoff, Johannes F.; Witzel, Karl-Paul (19 April 2010). "Unique clusters of Archaea in Salar de Huasco, an athalassohaline evaporitic basin of the Chilean Altiplano: Archaeal diversity in Salar de Huasco". FEMS Microbiology Ecology. 73 (2): 291–302. doi:10.1111/j.1574-6941.2010.00891.x. PMID 20491927.
- Schulz, Dirk; Beese, Pascal; Ohlendorf, Birgit; Erhard, Arlette; Zinecker, Heidi; Dorador, Cristina; Imhoff, Johannes F (December 2011). "Abenquines A–D: aminoquinone derivatives produced by Streptomyces sp. strain DB634". The Journal of Antibiotics. 64 (12): 763–768. doi:10.1038/ja.2011.87. ISSN 0021-8820. PMID 21952099.
