= Pachi y Pablo =

- Also known as: Pachi y Pablo
- Born: Sonia Paz Soto-Aguilar Orellana and Pablo Rosetti
- Genres: Pop
- Occupation: Singer-songwriter
- Instruments: Guitar, vocals

Pachi y Pablo was a Chilean musical duo, famous in Chile during the 1970s. Sonia Paz Soto-Aguilar Orellana and Pablo Rosetti were both students at Universidad de Chile. Pachi in the Drama and Performing Arts School and Pablo in the Music School

They recorded two hit songs: "Que Maravilla" "How Marvelous" and "Y te dire que hay amor" "I tell you, Love is here".

Both songs were in first and second place in the Chilean Musical Billboard charts for 16 weeks in 1972.

“Que Maravilla” Can be found in YouTube under “Pachi y Pablo Que Maravilla”

“Y te diré qué hay amor” Can be found in YouTube under “Pachi y Pablo Y te diré Qué hay amor.”

They appeared on many magazine covers, and did many television programs.

The first one was The Show of Alexander on Televisión Nacional de Chile, Canal 7.

Then Sábados Gigantes on Canal 13 Catholic University.

And several other programs on Chilevisión Canal 9 University of Chile.

They toured Chile, where the public was so taken by them, that it was necessary the assistance of the local police to keep the duo safe from their fans.

The duo separated in 1973.

Pachi went on to study at Rutgers University in New Jersey, USA. Later got married, made a family and a happy life in California.

Pablo went on to sing and made a living in El Salvador and Paris, France.

Pachi was presented with a Gold Record from the Asfona Recording Label in 2007 during a 10-day reality show based on her life by MegaChile Mega Television Chile.

Pablo unfortunately died on May 26, 2019, due to cancer.

Pablo sent this message from Chile to Pachi in California Before he died. It can be found in YouTube under the title “Pachi y Pablo tributo.”

Pachi recorded “Que Maravilla” in 2012 at age 60 yrs old as a soloist, with musical arrangements by the Chilean musician Hugo Jimenez in a Bossa Nova style.

“Que Maravilla” can be found on You Tube under the title “Pachi canta Que Maravilla.”
