= Armando Di Filippo =

Armando Di Filippo is an Argentine economist, an economic science faculty member at the University of Rosario and Magíster in economic science at the University of Chile.

== Economic Commission for Latin America and the Caribbean ==
From 1970 until 2000, he served as international officer and researcher for the Economic Commission For Latin America and the Caribbean-United Nations Economic Commission for Latin America and the Caribbean, a subsidiary of the United Nations in Santiago de Chile. During this period he occupied different posts. Among the most outstanding were:

- Director of Planning and Training at the Latin American Institute of Economic and Social Planning-ILPES, pertaining to the ECLAC system.
- Training Activities Director for United Nations Economic Commission for Latin America and the Caribbean (from the ILPES).
- Coordinator in the area of Regional Integration for ECLAC (from the Division of International Trade and Development).
- Special Advisor of the United Nations Economic Commission for Latin America and the Caribbean Executive Secretary on teaching and training activities.

He also organized and/or was a guest in multiple conferences and seminars in the United Nations System such as UNDP, UNCTAD, UNESCO, etc. He also was invited as a professor to the training activities of the World Trade Organization.

== Academic career ==
Armando Di Filippo's academic activities during the last thirty years include teaching at universities across South America and Mexico, France, Spain, Portugal and the United States. Most recently, he has been professor in the following universities:

- Stanford University CLAS & Economics
- Barcelona University (masters program in Economic Policy)
- Paris University III, Sorbonne Nouvelle (Institut de Hautes Etudes de L´Amerique Latine
- Stanford University (Overseas Studies Program)
- Universidad de Chile (Institute of International Studies)
- Universidad Alberto Hurtado Jesuit University (Chile) visiting professor at Stanford University, 2004–2005 and 2006

== Publications ==
He has authored several books including: "Poder Capitalismo y Democracia, RIL editores, Santiago, Chile 2014, Desarrollo y Desigualdad Social en América Latina (Colección Lecturas del Fondo de Cultura Económica), Mexico 1981, Raíces Históricas de las Estructuras Distributivas de América Latina, Publicaciones de la CEPAL, Santiago, 1979, Integración Regional, Desarrollo y Equidad (coautoría con Rolando Franco), CEPAL/SIGLO XXI Editores, México, 2000.

He is also an author or various compilations, of which the most recent is Las Dimensiones Sociales de la Integración Regional en América Latina, Libros de la CEPAL, 2000, with Rolando Franco.

Finally, he is the author of multiple articles and essays about economic and social topics published by CEPAL, CELADE, ILPES, etc. He has published in economic academic journals such as Revista de la CEPAL (Santiago), Trimestre Económico (México), Pensamiento Iberoamericano (Madrid), Revista de CELADE (Santiago), Revista Persona y Sociedad (Santiago), etc. He is the father of Armando, Nicolas, Colomba and Antonia.
