= Hugo K. Sievers =

Hugo Sievers

Minister of Agriculture
- In office 31 May 1955 – 18 August 1955
- President: Carlos Ibáñez del Campo
- Preceded by: Roberto Infante
- Succeeded by: José Suárez Fanjul

Personal details
- Born: 1903
- Died: 1972 (aged 68–69)

Hugo Konrad Sievers (1903–1972) was a Chilean scientist descending from a Hamburg merchant family. He was the founder of the Chilean Veterinary College and served as minister of agriculture in 1955.

He was born in Rengo 23 October 1903, where he studied in the German School. In 1925 he graduated as veterinary from the University of Chile. After further research in Argentina, Brazil, at the Institut Pasteur in Paris and at the Institute for tropical diseases in Hamburg, he received his PhD in 1929 in Hamburg.

Sievers was sent by the Chilean Government and the University of Chile on missions to Peru, Mexico, the United States, Japan, China, Korea, Indochina, India, Egypt and Italy.

Sievers was President of the Scientific Society of Chile, member of the Chilean Academy of Natural Sciences, Chilean Society of Microbiology, Chilean Society of Natural History, Scientific Society of Chile, Society of Biology and Veterinary Medicine Society. He appears in respective acts like cofounder of the Academy of Students of Veterinary Medicine, Veterinary Medicine Society, Chilean Natural Medicine Society, Society of Normal and Pathological Anatomy.

== Literature ==
- Sievers, Hugo K.: Chile: Desarrollo de la Medicina Veterinaria durante la República (1810–1970). Col. Médico Veterinario de Chile. Impr. Horizonte, Santiago
- Sievers, Hugo K.:"Chilenos en la Amazonía" 1949. Santiago de Chile: Editorial Universitaria.
