= Kei Takei =

Japanese dancer and choreographer (born 1946)

Kei Takei (武井 慧; born December 30, 1946) is a dancer-choreographer and the creator of Moving Earth dance company.

== Early years ==
Born in Tokyo, Takei studied a variety of dance styles including folk dances, ballet, and Japanese classical dance. She arrived in New York from Japan in 1967 for a Fulbright Scholarship at Juilliard School of Music based on the recommendation of Anna Sokolow. In 1969, Takei formed her dance troupe, Moving Earth. She has been the recipient of two Guggenheim Fellowships (1978 and 1988).

== Main work ==
Her signature work, Light, is an ongoing creation composed of more than 30 parts and spanning 30 years, with the choreographer drawing on both Western dance traditions as well as Japanese dance, martial arts, and theater. Each section of Light has a different theme and are both autonomous and woven into the whole opus and are not necessary performed in chronological order. The parts range from solo performances to works for more than 20 performers. Light premiered in 1969 with Takei's Moving Earth company performing part 1 at The National Shakespeare Company Cubiculo Theater in New York.

== Personal life ==
Takei married dancer-choreographer Lazuro Brezer in 1980. They had one son, Raishun. Brezer became Associate Director Takei's Moving Earth company in 1981. After 25 years in New York City, Takei returned to her native Japan in 1992 and created Moving Earth Orient Sphere.
