= Elsa Bolívar =

Chilean painter and educator (1929–2021)

- Born: Elsa Bolívar Bravo; 21 September 1929; Santiago, Chile
- Died: 9 April 2021 (aged 91); Santiago, Chile
- Education: University of Chile
- Occupations: Painter; educator
- Movement: Rectangle Group; Form and Space Movement

Elsa Bolívar Bravo (21 September 1929 – 9 April 2021) was a Chilean painter and educator. In 1965, Bolívar co-founded the Form and Space Movement (Spanish: Movimiento Forma y Espacio).

== Early life and education ==
Bolívar was born on 21 September 1929 (Note: Also cited as 1930.) in Santiago. From 1942 to 1946, Bolívar was educated at the Liceo Manuel de Salas.

In 1947, Bolívar enrolled at the Arts Faculty of the University of Chile where she studied under Carlos Pedraza Olguín, Jorge Letelier, Israel Roa and Jorge Caballero. From 1949 to 1952, Bolívar studied visual arts education and between 1953 and 1956 she studied painting at the University of Chile.

== Career ==
In 1950, participated in a painting workshop led by Emilio Pettoruti, and held her first solo show at the Chilean National Museum of Fine Arts. Bolívar began exhibiting regularly at official salons from 1953 onwards.

In the 1956, Bolívar joined the Rectangle Group (Spanish: Grupo Rectángulo) which aimed to develop abstraction through the exploration of geometric forms, and to eliminate the referential link between art and reality. The same year Bolívar exhibited at the groups first exhibition at the Círculo de Periodistas (Spanish: Círculo de Periodistas) in Santiago. In 1960, Bolívar exhibited at the 1st International Exhibition of Modern Art in Buenos Aires.

Bolívar later co-founded the Rectangle Group's successor the Form and Space Movement (Spanish: Movimiento Forma y Espacio) in 1965. Bolívar left the group in either 1974 or 1975.

Bolívar worked as a set designer for Enrique Noisvander's Mime Theatre.

=== Teaching ===
Bolívar taught drawing, composition and colour at the Arts Faculty of the University of Chile from 1954 (Note: Also cited as 1955.) to 1988, when she retired from university teaching. From 1979 to 1982, Bolívar served as the director of the Arts Faculty's visual arts department.

Bolívar also taught in secondary schools from the mid-1950s onwards.

== Personal life ==
On 9 April 2021 Bolívar died in Santiago, aged 91.
