= Matilde Pérez =

Chilean artist

- Born: December 7, 1916; Santiago, Chile
- Died: October 1, 2014 (aged 97); Santiago, Chile
- Known for: kinetic art

Matilde Pérez Cerda (December 7, 1916 – October 1, 2014) was a Chilean visual artist who specialised in kinetic art. She was a pioneer of modern and kinetic art in Chile. Her best known public pieces include Túnel Cinético (Kinetic Tunnel) in 1970, and el Friso, which was originally constructed at the Centro Comercial Apumanque in 1982, but is now located at the University of Talca.

== Biography ==
She was born in Santiago, Chile, on December 7, 1916. Studied Art in the University of Chile, where was student of Pablo Burchard and Jorge Caballero, also receiving lectures by Pedro Reszka and Laureano Guevara. In the Fine Arts School she married Gustavo Carrasco Délano, and they had a son, the architect Gustavo Carrasco Pérez.

In 1953, Pérez co-founded of the Group of Five (Spanish: Grupo de los cinco) along with Aída Poblete, Ximena Cristi, Sergio Montecinos and Ramón Vergara. The group aimed to move away from traditional figurative representation and held an exhibition at the Instituto Chileno-Francés de Cultura in Santiago. Pérez later became a part of the Rectangle Group (Spanish: Grupo Rectángulo).

She moved to Paris, France, during the early 1960s, where she became interested in kinetic art, which focuses on movement, including the work of Victor Vasarely. She joined the movement and became a kinetic artist herself. Her work shows the "experimentation with the possibilities of creation of virtual movement through the optical illusion", and "is based in the investigation of the visual effects of the abstract forms and the use of colour. Her paint combinates the study of the space, the line, the colour and the materials, which reveals a rigour in the composition, a rational control of colour and a respect to the support"

Perez opened more than fifty art shows worldwide during the 2000s and 2010s, including El Ojo Latino, Colección Luciano Benetton at the Contemporary Arts Museum of Santiago (2008), Exposición Arte en América at the La Moneda Palace's Cultural Centre (2010–2011), Mavi la Colección at the Visual Arts Museum of Santiago (2011), and her participation in the Chilean Fine Arts National Museum's Official Hall in 1939, 1943, 1944, 1947 and 1947.

In 2004, she received the Altazor Award of National Arts in the Engraving and Drawing category for her work Serigrafías, while in 2011 she received a new nomination to the same award by Acá en la Estructura. In the 2013 version of this prize, she was nominated in the Painting category by Open Cube. At the same year, she received the Academia Prize, otorgated by the Chilean Fine Arts Academy.

In 2012, her retrospective exhibition opened at Pinta, the largest annual Latin American art show in London, when she was 95 years old. She was still creating new artistic works at the time and expressed no interest in retiring from her work. The BBC called her "one of the most widely acclaimed women in the international art world." In an interview with BBC Mundo, she was quoted, "One changes if you're bored. If you're not bored you don't change." Her last major exhibition, "Matilde X Matilde, Espacio móvil," featuring previously unpublished sketches and other materials, was held in 2013.

== Death ==
Matilde Pérez died from cardiac arrest in Santiago, Chile, on October 1, 2014, at the age of 97. Her funeral was held at the Iglesia San Patricio in Las Condes with burial at Parque del Recuerdo in Huechuraba.

== Tribute ==
On 7 December 2015, Google Doodle commemorated her 99th birthday.
