= Héctor Herrera Cajas =

Chilean historian (1930–1997)

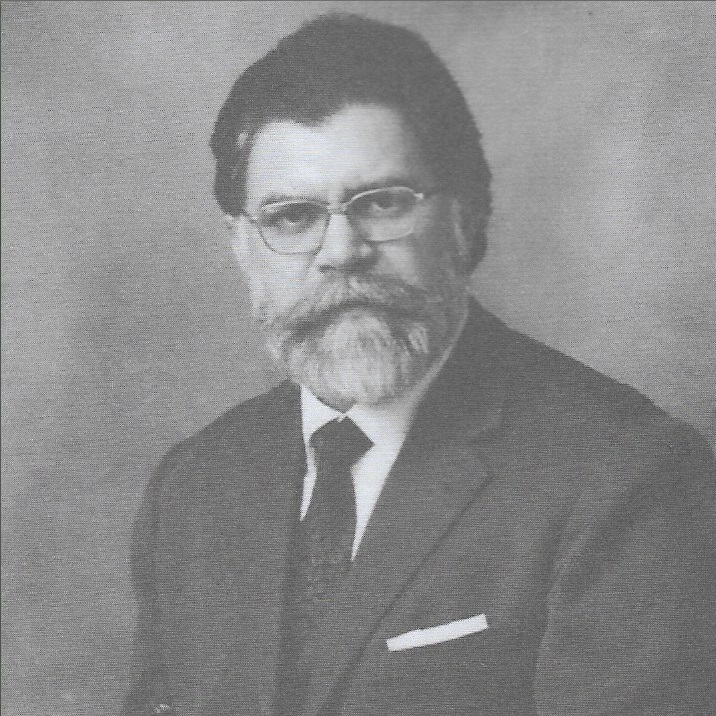
- Herrera Cajas as Head of the Universidad Metropolitana de Ciencias de la Educacion (UMCE) in 1986–1989
- Born: Héctor Enrique Herrera Cajas; 13 September 1930; Pelequén, Chile
- Died: 6 October 1997 (aged 67); Vina del Mar, Chile
- Citizenship: Chile
- Occupations: Historian and author
- Spouse: Ivone Lavanchy (m. 1967)

Academic background
- Education: Universidad de Chile (BA in history, 1953); University of Bordeaux (PhD in ancient history, 1968)
- Influences: Eugenio Pereira • Mario Góngora • Jean Daniélou • Juan Gómez Millas • Fotios Malleros

Academic work
- Discipline: History of Byzantine Empire; History of mentalities Medieval history Cultural history Art history History of Foreign Affairs
- Institutions: Pontifical Catholic University of Valparaíso (1954–1997); University of Educational Sciences (1986–1989)
- Doctoral students: Gabriel Salazar (1960)
- Notable works: Tacitus' Germany. The problem of the meaning of the shield (1957); History of Byzantine Empire Foreign Affairs (1958); Res privata-Res publica-Imperium (1977)
- Influenced: Gabriel Salazar • Eduardo Cavieres • José Marín • Miguel Castillo Didier • Umberto Laffi

Héctor Enrique Herrera Cajas (13 September 1930 – 6 October 1997) was a Chilean historian and scholar who specialized in Byzantine studies. He is remembered as a polyglot and as the teacher of two recipients of Chile’s National History Prize: Gabriel Salazar and Eduardo Cavieres, both noted scholars of economic and social history.

Herrera was a disciple of the Greek historian Fotios Malleros, and is regarded as the first Byzantinist in Latin America. His scholarship on the history of Byzantium focused particularly on Byzantine foreign relations and art. At the Universidad de Chile, his alma mater, he taught regular courses and co-founded the Universidad de Chile Center for Byzantine and Neohellenic Studies, the only institution of its kind in the subcontinent. He later served as professor at the Pontifical Catholic University of Valparaíso (PUCV) and, from 1954 onward, at the Pontifical Catholic University of Chile (PUC).

Among his most significant works are Tacitus' Germany: The problem of the meaning of the shield (1957) and "Res Privata–Res publica–Imperium" (1977). The former is considered a pioneering contribution to the history of mentalities in Chilean historiography. In it, Herrera examines Tacitus’ account to analyze the symbolic meaning of the shield among early Germanic peoples and explores its implications for the transition toward medieval history. José Marín remarked that Herrera makes “the source speak in a really remarkable way, since Tacitus himself says little about the subject in question”.

His article "Res Privata–Res publica–Imperium" "conceptually examines the trajectory of Roman institutions from their foundation until the fall of the Western Empire", and analyzes the relationship between the private sphere and public institutions, arguing that by the end of the Empire these institutions socially re-privatized themselves. Herrera maintained that this process resulted from the influence of Germanic peoples and their private institutional structures, rejecting both rupture and continuity theories as explanatory models between the Roman and post-Roman worlds.

From 1958 until his death, Herrera devoted sustained research to the foreign affairs of the Byzantine Civilization, examining themes such as the formation of its imperial ideology, its relations with the Church, its artistic expressions, and the symbolism of imperial power in relation to the Frankish Kingdom and the Abbasid Caliphate.

Herrera served as head of the Universidad Metropolitana de Ciencias de la Educación (UMCE) from 1986 to 1989, where he also founded its Classical Studies Center. A few days after his death, the Finis Terrae University inaugurated the Jornadas de Historia Héctor Herrera Cajas. (Note: In English Héctor Herrera Cajas History Weeks.) In 1989, he was admitted as a full member of the Academia Chilena de la Historia and, since November 1997, the main lecture hall of the PUCV History Institute has borne his name.

Among those influenced by Herrera, Salazar stated that he valued him “for his human quality and his way of teaching”. This admiration did not obscure their antagonistic political positions, as Salazar was a member of the Revolutionary Left Movement (MIR), whereas Herrera opposed the rebel movements of the 1960s. Likewise, from the beginning of Augusto Pinochet's dictatorship (1973–1990), Herrera aligned himself with the doctrinal orientation of the Ministry of Education under the military regime.

== Biography and Academic career ==
=== Early life and beginnings: 1930–1953 ===
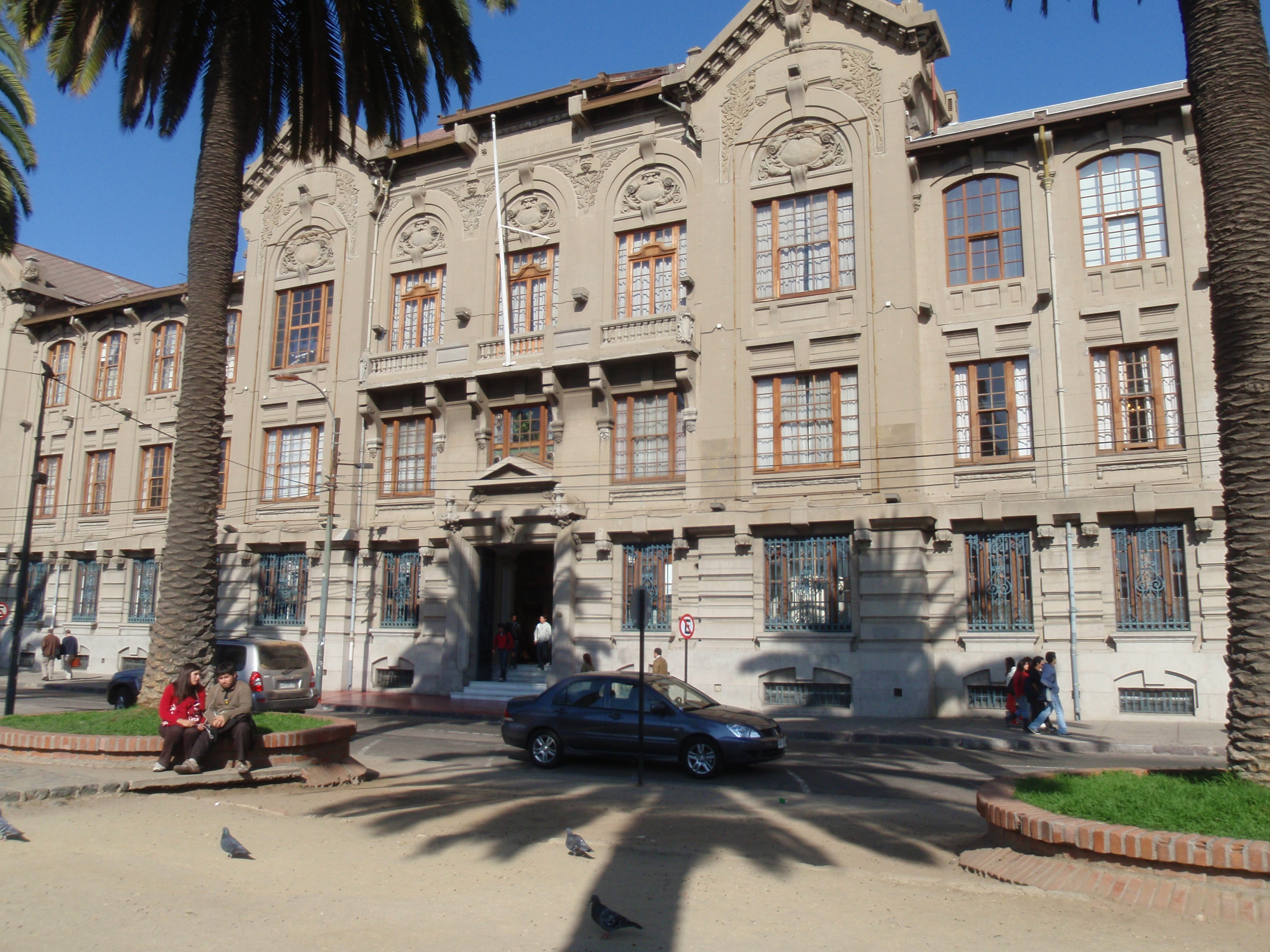
Pontifical Catholic University of Valparaíso Casa Central, first headquarter of the current PUCV Institute of History.

Born in Pelequén, a town about 125 kilometers south of Santiago, Herrera first attended Hermanos Maristas School in San Fernando, Colchagua. During his last years in the school he served as a mathematics teacher.

After finishing his high-school education, Herrera moved to Santiago, and in 1948 joined the Universidad de Chile. He graduated in 1953 as a history, geography and social sciences teacher. Apart from his regular and compulsory courses, he studied Latin, Greek, German and Sanskrit, and became fluent in English, French and Italian. He was also interested in Chinese, Arabic and Russian, but he did not reach fluency in them. His philology studies were decisive in his intellectual training. In his classes, according to his student and close friend José Marín, the etymology of words was key in his narration of history. During his undergraduate period, Herrera was influenced by teachers like Eugenio Pereira, Mario Góngora, (Note: Héctor Herrera was Mario Góngora's assistant.) Juan Gómez Millas and Fotios Malleros.

=== Arrival at PUCV: 1953–1973 ===
In 1953, Pontificia Universidad Católica de Valparaíso (PUCV) hired him with the goal of organizing its then-nascent History Institute. In 1960, he became the dean of the PUCV Faculty of Philosophy and Education and the rector of the linked Rubén Castro School.

He continued his studies in Germany (1957–1958), where he attended several universities.

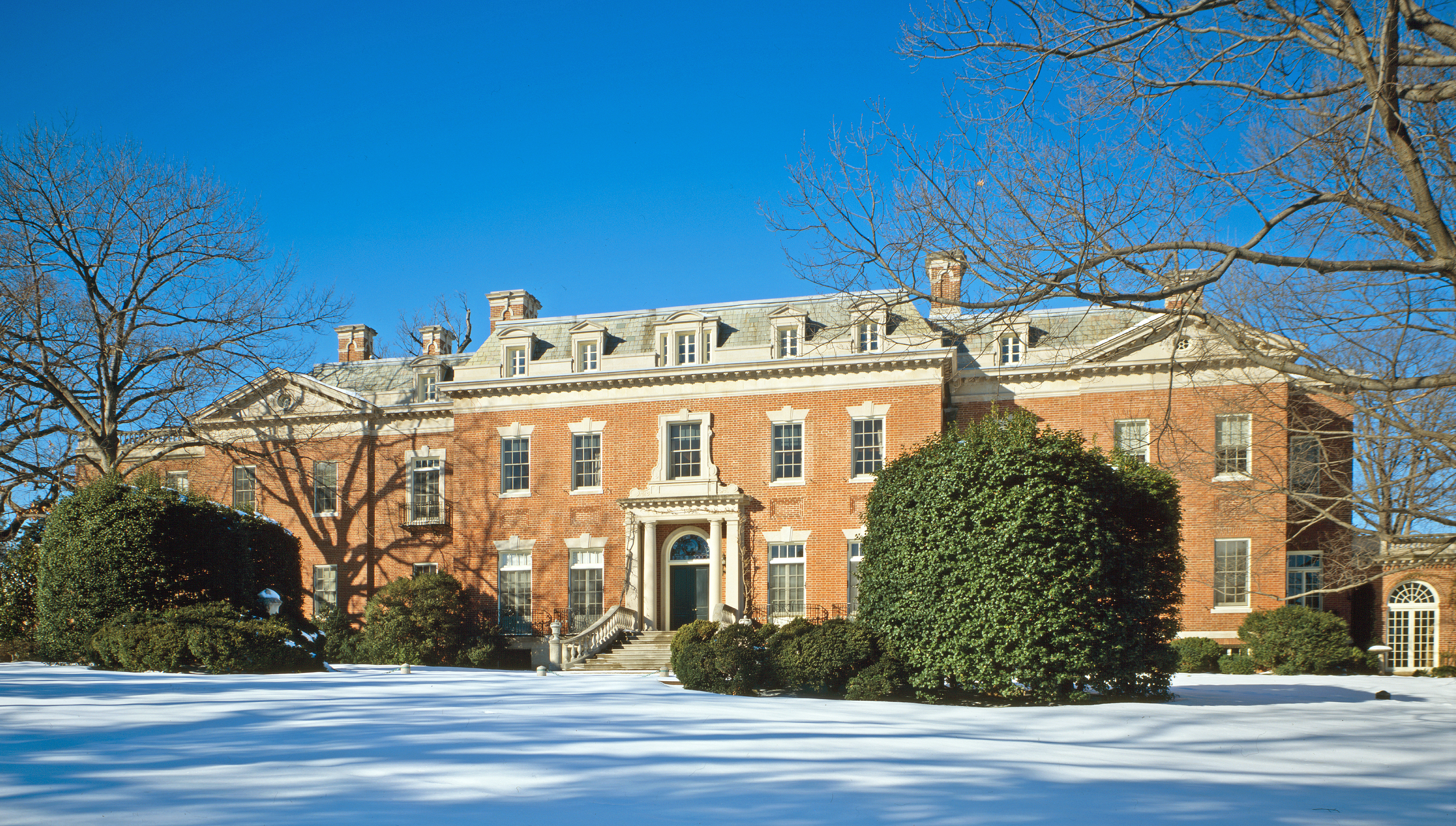
The Dumbarton Oaks compound.

In 1964, he married Ivonne Lavanchy, who was a member of the Fulbright Commission that was based in Washington D.C., and whose funding had allowed Herrera to dedicate himself to researching Byzantine affairs for seven months in Dumbarton Oaks, which was considered the world's leading center for Byzantine studies, and where he met prominent Byzantinists. A year earlier, accompanied by his family, Herrera had traveled to France on a scholarship obtained after successful negotiations with the Cultural Attaché of the French embassy in Chile: M. Pommier. He obtained his Ph.D. at the University of Bordeaux in 1968 with his thesis "The International Relations of the Byzantine Empire during the time of the great invasions".

According to Herrera, among "favorable factors" which allowed him to present his thesis project to the French university was the "fraternal friendship" with Professor Rómulo Santana, who encouraged him to undertake the task and who helped him "to resolve any difficulties that may arise, lavishing [the faculty] with his enthusiastic advice". Santana's connection with the University of Bordeaux meant that Herrera could obtain an "invitation from the German Academic Exchange Service (DAAD) to visit Germany" and meet with professors such as Franz Altheim or Rubin, whose advice he described as valuable. Around that time he made contact with professors like Guillemain, who became his thesis director. Similarly, his Fulbright scholarship allowed him to enrich the bases of his research, which was complemented by his bibliography from access to PUCV, PUC and his alma mater libraries, for which he gave special thanks to their respective rectors.

During his term in France, Herrera was a witness of the May 68 unrest and, according to Marín, his epistolary shows how he opposed the so-called "Reform" that was carried out in parallel in Chile. The reform in his country had been promoted by the Christian-Democrat government of Eduardo Frei Montalva, whose party was involved in the 1968 PUCV Rector Elections. Despite his opposition to the reform, according to Alejandro Guzmán Brito in 2013 Roman Studies Week, Herrera supported Vial through his collaboration with Oscar Godoy, with whom he met in Arica.

=== Academic maturity: 1973–1986 ===
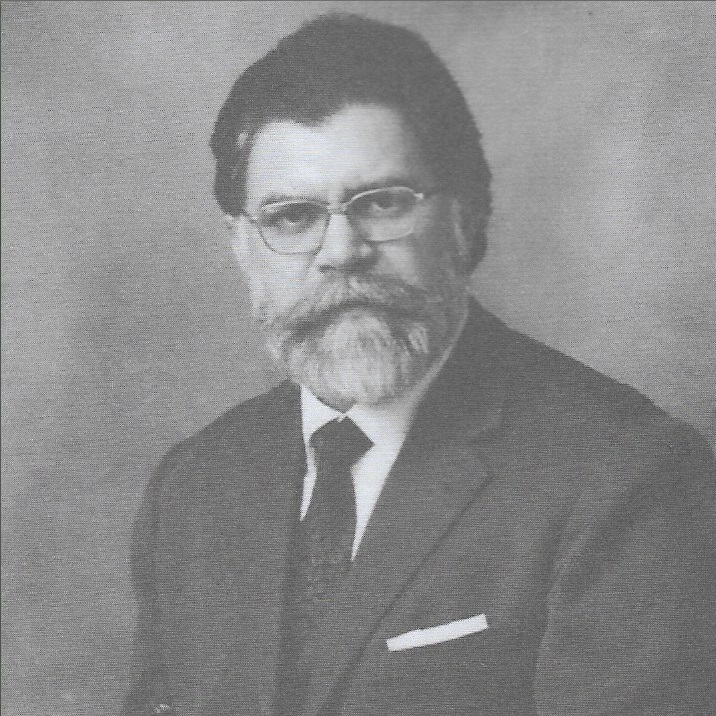
Herrera Cajas in 1973

Despite Herrera's discomfort in the then-rebellious France, he finished his thesis on the Byzantine Empire's international relations during the Migration Period. The work was published in 1972 in Santiago by the Universidad de Chile Center for Byzantine and Neohellenic Studies, in which Marín says: "It's a study of great intellectual rigor, with an impeccable critical apparatus which all existing sources for the subject are cited and commented; in short, it's a highest level research which has deservedly placed its author among most important Byzantinists of the second half of the 20th century." Herrera's thesis was the only work in the Spanish language which German historian Günther Weiss included in his specialized bibliographic repertoire, which covered everything relevant that occurred in Byzantinistics between 1968 and 1985.

Weiss pointed out: "On Byzantine and Neohellenic Studies Centre publication in Santiago, scholar Professor Héctor Herrera Cajas presents all the (Byzantine) important diplomatic relations at great migrations time, treated from Persian border to Danube. The text is worked directly from sources and illustrates very well each moment's political background. Byzantine diplomacy oscillates between demand for universality, and harshest, often painful and distressing."

In 1973 at PUCV, Herrera launched Roman Studies Week, which is held every year and has become one of Latin America's most prestigious academic exchanges relative to the history of ancient Rome. Herrera presented works in each of the Roman Studies Week seasons celebrated between 1973 and 1997. In 1976, the PUCV Federation of Students elected him as "the best teacher".

In 1986, the XVII Byzantine International Congress' Administrative Committee, held in Dumbarton Oaks, accepted his presentation on "The Steppe Peoples and Byzantine Art Formation: From the Tent to Christian Church", but its author could not attend to read it.

=== UMCE Rectorate: 1986–1989 ===
In 1986, Herrera was appointed by authorities as the head of the Universidad Metropolitana de Ciencias de la Educación for three years, according to Decree No. 754 on 22 August.

According to No. 159 Edition of Analysis Magazine (opposed to Pinochet), Herrera's rectorate had to face the alleged controversy of discriminatory practices towards the admission and permanence of students. According to testimonies, its indirect restrictions were based on measures such as the requirement of annual tuition of $15,000. This amount made it, for a good number of students, practically inaccessible to enter the institution. Likewise, he was criticized for adding an additional Spanish test, whose result was weighted more than the consideration given to the Academic Aptitude Test score. He was also accused of having promoted a moral and psychological assessment test whose evaluation verified the "reviewing the political background of the students" according to Alejandro Millán, then president of UMCE's Visual Arts Student Center. These arguments explain why current academics from that university, such as Luis Rubilar Solís, describe Herrera as a "repressor par excellence".

In regards to budgeting, another faculty member questioned one of Herrera's measures when the School of Philosophy was closed, an academic unit that had stopped receiving students since the year when he was appointed as the university's highest authority. In his detractors' opinion, financial reasons given by his rectorate are not convincing considering that he inherited the surplus budget of 1985; that is, $700 million that were used to build two new casinos.

On 25 April 1989, Herrera submitted his resignation according to Decree No. 341 provisions.

=== Later life and death: 1990–1997 ===
On 6 October 1997, Herrera died of a myocardial infarction at Vina del Mar.

== Historical thought ==
The historiography of Herrera is hegemonized by a philosophy linked to religious-spiritual transcendence. The emphasis is explained by using a theoretical framework to globally study the reality of human culture (both abstract and material), which must also include an interdisciplinary view that gives "good sense" to the historical narrative from "different paths" that form the "same sense". The circumstantial reasons that motivated the author to opt for that perspective are found in his intellectual concerns inspired by the faith of the priests (or "fathers") of the Catholic Church and enriched by his contact with the work of religious authors such as Henri Marrou, Eric Dardel or the theologian Jean Daniélou, all French intellectuals.

According to Paola Corti, a scholar of Herrera's school of thought, one of the greatest priorities of this historian lay in the search for the "[...] mystery of the unity of history, the mystery of the origin, the end of she, and finally, Mysteries of the Lord himself of History; the mystery of God [...]". To justify those judgments regarding the author's work, Corti as a methodology to make a dialogue or conference by Herrera from two articles, where his main idea is that for "the definitive conquest of history", one must even overcoming "the most complex formal investigation" to seek to enter the zeitgeist that imbues historical subject. Herrera would point out that the historian's attitude should be based on respect and humility, since values that both project respectively is based on both the special valuation of the processes, characters or facts.

== Political views ==
=== National–conservatism ===
Although Herrera was not a member of any political party, he supported Ibañismo during the 1950s. In the 1964 presidential elections, he assumed directive functions in nationalist candidate Jorge Prat's campaign in an administration where he was a member of the anticommunist faction of a national-popular government that had two phases: one of a statist policies that received support from the Chilean Socialist Party and was close to Peronism (1953–1955), and another marked by proto–neoliberal economic reforms linked to the Klein-Saks Mission (1955–1958).

Between 1973 and 1990, Herrera collaborated with Gral. Augusto Pinochet dictatorship's educational policy— through military junta—decided to take on free-market reforms that neither Ibáñez nor Jorge Alessandri wanted to apply, and the initial nationalist line of the 1974 curricular framework was later contradicted by neoliberal economic principles enshrined by the junta in the 1980 Constitution. During the whole regime, there was no major contradiction in the anti-Marxist narrative, which was consensual between classical Western values and the predominance of civic duties over rights (then curtailed). Proof of Herrera's consonance with at least two of the three points (except anti-Marxism) are given by two of his testimonies in a seminar carried out in September 1987 titled "The role of culture in the new institutionality". Politicians from the Second Republic (1925–1973), such as Mario Arnello Romo, attended. There Herrera declared:

A true homeland is made up more of the dead people than of the living people, and we are the current representatives of those generations...

According to Isabel Jara Hinojosa, the author that accredits the statements, (Note: The article is "Nationalism and artistic-cultural policy of the Chilean dictatorship: the secretariat of cultural relations".) Herrera showed an "evident Francoist spirit" in the first appointment which, in his opinion, was reinforced when he later talked about the concept of tradition, where he states:

To be aware of what country and nation are, it's necessary to reach a certain level of historical existence. That is because not all people fully understand the meaning to belong to a nation. After all, it occurs when we feel that there is something we must defend through our being, feeling which we call "the national being".

== Works ==
=== Books ===
- El mundo del ayer. Manual de Historia Antigua y Medieval para Educación Básica. Ediciones Pedagógicas (1971)
- Las Relaciones Internacionales del Imperio Bizantino durante la Época de las Grandes Invasiones. Universidad de Chile Center for Byzantine and Neohellenic Studies Editions (1972)
- Antigüedad y Edad Media. Manual de Historia Universal, I. Academia Superior de Ciencias Pedagógicas (1983)
- Dimensiones de la Responsabilidad Educacional. Editorial Universitaria (1988)
- Dimensiones de la Cultura Bizantina. Arte, Poder y Legado Histórico. Universidad de Chile Center for Byzantine and Neohellenic Studies Editions and Universidad Gabriela Mistral Editions (1998)
- El Imperio Bizantino. Introducción Histórica y Selección de Documentos. Universidad de Chile Center for Byzantine and Neohellenic Studies Editions (1998)
- Ensayos sobre el Mundo Medieval de Héctor Herrera Cajas. Colección de escritos inéditos, compilado por Leonardo Carrera Airola (2018)

=== Articles ===
- "La Germania de Tácito. El problema del significado del escudo" (1957) (Note: It was re–edited in 1995.)
- "El Chou-King y la concepción del poder real" (1953)
- "Acerca del Duelo" (1955)
- "El problema del significado del escudo en La Germania de Tácito" (1957)
- "Las relaciones internacionales del Imperio Bizantino" (1958)
- "El Presente, tiempo de la acción" (1963)
- "Engaño y desengaño en la historiografía actual" (1969)
- "Synésios de Cirene. Un crítico del Imperio" (1970)
- "Dagoberto y Heraclio. Un capítulo de Historia Diplomática" (1971)
- "La caída del Imperio Romano en Occidente" (1976)
- "Res privata-Res publica-Imperium" (1977)
- "San Benito y la formación de Occidente" (1980)
- "Bizancio y la formación de Rusia (Los tratados bizantino-rusos del s. X)" (1982)
- "Las estepas euroasiáticas. Un peculiar espacio histórico" (1982)
- "El sentido de la crisis en Occidente" (1983)
- "Apelación a la Historia en el De Officiis de Cicerón" (1984)
- "Los orígenes del arte bizantino, ensayo sobre la formación del arte cristiano" (1985)
- "Aproximación al Espíritu Imperial Bizantino" (1986)
- "Temas de Claudiano" (1986)
- "La Constitución del ámbito cívico en el Mundo Grecorromano" (1986)
- "Una utopía medievalː la "Orden Nueva" concebida por Joachim of Fiore" (1988)
- "El totalitarismo como persistencia de la mentalidad primitiva" (1988)
- "José Ignacio Víctor Eyzaguirre, Historiador" (1989)
- "Los pueblos de las estepas y la formación del arte bizantino. De la tienda a la iglesia cristiana" (1990)
- "Notas sobre el significado de la guerra" (1990)
- "La arquitectura del 'Discurso sobre la Historia Universal' de Bossuet "(1990)
- "Los estudios superiores en Bizancio" (1990–1992)
- "Los árabes y el Islam" (1991)
- "La Espiritualidad Bizantina" (1993)
- "La Doctrina Gelasiana" (1994)
- "La idea imperial bizantinaː representación y concentración del poder" (1995)
- "La espiritualidad bizantina en el arte" (1995)
- "Simbología política del poder imperial en Bizancioː los pendientes de las coronas" (1993–1996)
- "Príncipe e Imperio en el panegírico de Trajano de Plinio el Joven" (1996)
- "El Milenarismo en la Historia Antigua y Medieval" (1996)
- "Fiestas imperiales en Constantinopla" (1997)
- "Cómo leer a Floro" (1998)
- "Lo cotidiano, ayer y hoy, aquí y allá" (1997–1998)
- "Ética y educación. Una reflexión sobre los valores en nuestra sociedad" (1998)
- "San Benito y el Ordo Romano" (1999)

== See also ==
- Fotios Malleros
- PUCV History Institute
- Universidad de Chile Center for Byzantine and Neohellenic Studies

== Sources ==
- Buono-Core Varas, Raúl (2004). Pontificia Universidad Católica de Valparaíso: desde su fundación hasta la reforma 1928-1973: Un espíritu, una identidad (in Spanish). Vol. I. Ediciones Universitarias de Valparaíso.
- Corti, Paola (2009). "El Pensamiento Histórico de Hector Herrera Cajas" (PDF). Temas de Historia. Santiago de Chile: Universidad Gabriela Mistral. Archived from the original (PDF) on 15 July 2010.
- Herrera Cajas, Héctor (1972). Las Relaciones Internacionales del Imperio Bizantino durante la época de las grandes invasiones (in Spanish). Byzantion Nea Hella. pp. 463–466.
- Herrera Cajas, Héctor (1988). Dimensiones de la responsabilidad educacional (in Spanish). Editorial Universitaria. ISBN 978-84-8340-281-8.
- Moulián, Tomás (2006). Fracturas: de Pedro Aguirre Cerda a Salvador Allende (1938-1973) (in Spanish). LOM Ediciones. ISBN 978-956-282-828-4.
- Rubilar Solís, Luis H. (2009). Universidad Metropolitana de Ciencias de la Educación (ex-pedagógico), 1889-2010. Santiago de Chile: Univ. Metropolitana de Ciencias de la Educación, Fondo Ed. UMCE. ISBN 978-956-7062-70-6.
- Salazar, Gabriel (2010). Conversaciones con Carlos Altamirano. Santiago de Chile: Debate. ISBN 978-9568410391.
- Torres Duijisin, Isabel (2014). La crisis del sistema democrático: las elecciones presidenciales y los proyectos políticos excluyentes; Chile 1958-1970. Santiago de Chile: Centro de Investigaciones Diego Barros Arana. ISBN 978-9561124257.
- Vitale, Luis (1998). Interpretación marxista de la historia de Chile. Santiago de Chile: LOM. ISBN 9789560002488.
- Marín, José Luis; Pezoa, Álvaro; Widow, José (2009). Un Magisterio Vital: Historia, Educación y Cultura. Homenaje a Héctor Herrera Cajas. Editorial Universitaria.
