= Sebastián Salinas Gaete =

Chilean historian

Personal details
- Born: Chile
- Education: University of Chile (BA) (MA)
- Occupation: Researcher
- Profession: Historian

Sebastián Salinas Gaete

Sebastián Salinas Gaete is a Chilean historian and a sports commentator, who is known for publishing a book on the history of Colo-Colo.

He has taught courses at the University of Chile Center for Byzantine and Neohellenic Studies and at the Center for Arab Studies of the same university.

== Works ==
- Por empuje y coraje: Los albos en la época amateur 1925−1933 (2004)

== See also ==
- University of Chile Center for Byzantine and Neohellenic Studies
