= Claudio Elórtegui Gómez =

Chilean journalist (born 1976)

- Born: Claudio Domingo Elórtegui Gómez; 18 October 1976 (age 49); Valparaíso, Chile
- Education: Pontificia Universidad Católica de Valparaíso
- Occupations: Journalist, scholar, author

Claudio Domingo Elórtegui Gómez (born 18 October 1976) is a Chilean journalist and specializes in political communication and mass media.

== Biography ==
Gómez is the son of the Chilean economist Claudio Elórtegui Raffo. He is a professor at Pontificia Universidad Católica de Valparaíso. Prior to being a professor at PUCV, he received both a MA degree and a PhD in Communication Sciences at Spain's Autonomous University of Barcelona.

He has been the host of news program UCV Televisión Noticias' central edition as well as he worked for Chamber of Deputies of Chile Channel in programs like Puntos de Vista (Points of view). On January 11, 2010, he represented UCV Televisión in the ANATEL 2009–10 presidential election debate appearing in the ballotage between centre-right candidate Sebastián Piñera (from National Renewal party) and centre-leftist Eduardo Frei Ruiz-Tagle, member of the Christian Democratic Party and son of former Chilean President, Eduardo Frei Montalva (1964–1970).

== Works ==
- Populismo y Comunicación. Barcelona, UOCPress, 2013
- Fuente-Mella, Hanns de la; Umaña-Hermosilla, Benito; Fonseca-Fuentes, Marisela; Elórtegui-Gómez, Claudio (1 September 2021). "Multinomial Logistic Regression to Estimate the Financial Education and Financial Knowledge of University Students in Chile". openurl.ebsco.com.
- Elórtegui Gómez, Claudio; De La Fuente-Mella, Hanns (2022). "Analysis of Political Debate Programs to Identify the Elements of Political Transition Process in Chile". doi:10.54941/ahfe1002296.
- Araya, Rodrigo; Gómez, Claudio Elórtegui (2019). "Data Journalism in Chile: Towards a Critical Appropriation". Data Journalism in the Global South (in Ukrainian). pp. 301–315. doi:10.1007/978-3-030-25177-2_16.
- Elórtegui Gómez, Claudio; Mellado Ruiz, Claudia (17 July 2019). "Roles del periodismo político en un contexto multiplataforma y de crisis institucional". Comunicación y Sociedad. pp. 1–23. doi:10.32870/cys.v2019i0.7136.
