= Claudio Elórtegui Raffo =

Chilean economist (born 1951)

Claudio Elórtegui

Head of the Pontifical Catholic University of Valparaíso
- In office 26 July 2010 – 26 July 2022
- Preceded by: Alfonso Muga
- Succeeded by: Nelson Vásquez Lara

Personal details
- Born: Claudio Elórtegui Raffo; 9 December 1951 (age 74) Valparaíso, Chile
- Party: Christian Democratic Party; Amarillos por Chile
- Education: Pontifical Catholic University of Valparaíso; University of Pittsburgh (MA)
- Occupation: Economist, scholar

Claudio Hipólito Elórtegui Raffo (born 9 December 1951) is a Chilean economist who is the current rector of the Pontifical Catholic University of Valparaíso.

Elórtegui received as a commercial engineer from Pontifical Catholic University of Valparaíso (PUCV) in 1975. Then, in 1979, he completed a Master of Arts in economics at the University of Pittsburgh. Among his scholar interests also are the Foreign Affairs, an area where he completed – after completing his MA at United States — a postgraduate diploma in the university where he began: the PUCV, institution that then offered a specialization in Latinamerican affairs with a mention in economics. During his professional career, he has also served as director of companies in both public and private business.

In 2010, he became PUCV's rector, being reelected in 2014 and 2018. That charge has allowed him serving as president of Chilean Non-State Public Universities Network (commonly known as G9). Among his publications in the economics area, it highlights «Endeudamiento externo y conversión de deuda en la economía chilena» (or External indebtedness and debt conversion in the Chilean economy).

== Scholar career ==
In 1975, he debuted as a teacher of the School of Business and Economics, where he taught courses in microeconomics, macroeconomics and international economics in both undergraduate and graduate programs. This trajectory in his curriculum allowed him to reach a position as director of the career's academic unity (June 1984–April 1990). After April 1990, and already with christian-democrat Patricio Aylwin as President of the Republic, he was appointed as regional ministerial secretary of finances of Valparaíso Region, serving in this position until 1994. Besides, during this period, he was president of the Regional Administration's Productive Development Committee, being a titular member of the Regional Preventive Commission (Antitrust law).

From August 1994 to July 2010, Elórtegui served as vice-rector of PUCV administration and finances. Likewise, he was an academic representative of economics area in Valparaíso Regional Adjudication Committee for Public Criminal Defense Office (2003–2010).

== Politics ==
On 18 February 2022, it was reported he joined Amarillos por Chile.

== Personal life ==
He is father of Claudio Elórtegui Gómez, journalist of the PUCV.

== Works ==
- Endeudamiento externo y conversión de deuda en la economía chilena. Ediciones Universitarias de Valparaíso. 1988. 194 pages.
