= Bernardo Donoso =

Chilean politician

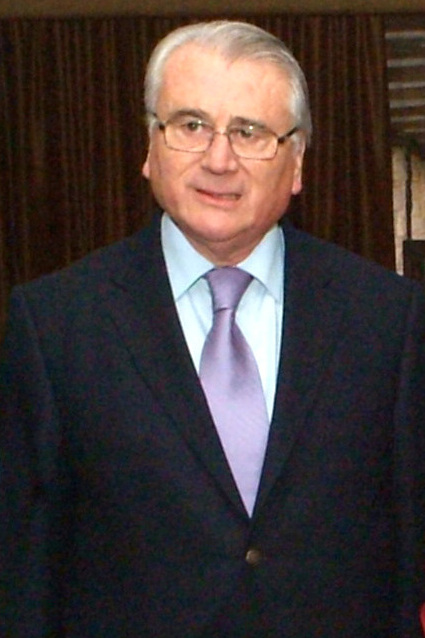

Head of the Pontifical Catholic University of Valparaíso
- In office 1990–1998
- Preceded by: Juan Enrique Frömel
- Succeeded by: Alfonso Muga

Personal details
- Born: 12 February 1946 (age 80) Limache, Chile
- Party: Christian Democratic Party
- Children: Two
- Education: Pontifical Catholic University of Valparaíso (BA); Michigan State University (MA)
- Occupation: Researcher and Scholar
- Profession: Business manager

Bernardo Alfonso Modesto Donoso Riveros (born 12 February 1946) is a Chilean scholar and researcher who served as head of the Pontifical Catholic University of Valparaíso (1990−1998) during the first years of the transition to democracy.

== Biography ==
=== Scholar life ===
After obtaining his BA in business administration at the PUCV, he did a master's degree at the Michigan State University, specifically Labor Relations and Communication.

After all that, Donoso established as a professor at the PUCV School of Commercial Engineering, in which he taught organizational behavior and human resources.

=== In the TV ===
From 1997 to 2000, Donoso was president of Asociación Nacional de Televisión (ANATEL), position in which he again served from 2008 to 2012. Similarly, he was president of the National Television Council (CNTV) from 2000 to 2001 as well as a member of the Ethics Council of the Chilean Social Media Federation (2002−2006)

From 2000s to 2010s, Donoso was president of the Board of Directors of UCV Televisión. There, he hosted the program "Pensando Chile" and also served four times as moderator of the presidential debates.
