= Enrique Wiegand Frödden =

Chilean politician

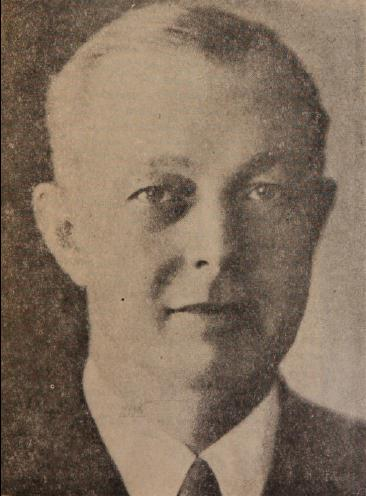

Member of the Chamber of Deputies
- In office 5 April 1946 – 15 May 1953
- Preceded by: Ismael Carrasco
- Constituency: 6th Departamental Agrupation

Mayor of Viña del Mar
- In office 1935–1938
- In office 1938–1945

Personal details
- Born: 1 January 1895 Quillota, Chile
- Died: 12 June 1962 (aged 67) Santiago, Chile
- Party: Conservative Party
- Spouse: Elisa Graham
- Education: Pontifical Catholic University of Valparaíso (LL.B)
- Profession: Lawyer

Enrique Wiegand Frödden (20 January 1895−12 June 1947) was a Chilean lawyer and politician who was member of the Chamber of Deputies of Chile.

He taught at the Pontifical Catholic University of Valparaíso.

== Early life and education ==
Born in Valparaíso to Augusto Wiegand and María Rosalba Frödden, he studied at the Colegio de los Sagrados Corazones de Valparaíso, where he also pursued legal studies. He was sworn in as a lawyer on 27 June 1917 with the thesis De la patria potestad.

He married Elisa Garnham.

== Professional career ==
Wiegand practiced law in institutions such as the Bank of London, the Bank of South America, Fideos Carozzi and the insurance company La Central. He served as President of the Aurífera Ocoa Association, the Cooperativa de Consumo Porteña and the Empresa Municipal de Desagües. He was Consul of Portugal in Valparaíso until 1952.

He contributed to the press on legal matters and was a professor of Procedural Law in Valparaíso, and of Civic Education at the Arturo Prat Naval Academy and the Colegio de los Sagrados Corazones. He served as Secretary-General of the Pontifical Catholic University of Valparaíso and secretary of the Faculty of Law of the Sagrados Corazones.

== Political career ==
A member of the Conservative Party, he was Councillor (Regidor) of the Municipality of Viña del Mar (1935–1938; 1938–1941).

He was elected Deputy for the 6th Departamental Group (Valparaíso, Casablanca, Quillota, Limache) in the 1946 by-election held after the death of Radical Deputy Ismael Carrasco Rábago. He was proclaimed on 25 June 1946 with 21,304 votes, defeating Rolando Rivas Fernández (PRD), Esteban Delgadillo (Communist), and Francisco Vío (Falange Nacional).

During his first term he sat on the Standing Committee on Constitution, Legislation and Justice. He obtained reelection for 1949–1953 and served on the Standing Committee on Foreign Relations.

== Memberships ==
He was a member of the Colegio de Abogados, the Club de Viña del Mar and the Golf Club.
