= José María Pinedo Goycochea =

Chilean politician

José María Pinedo G.

Member of the Chamber of Deputies
- In office 15 May 1941 – 15 May 1945
- Constituency: 23rd Departamental Agrupation

Personal details
- Born: 22 August 1893 Iquique, Chile
- Died: 3 September 1971 (aged 78) Santiago, Chile
- Party: Conservative Party
- Spouse(s): Inés Navarrete; Carmen Navarro
- Children: 7
- Parent(s): Serafín Pinedo; Juana Goycochea
- Education: Pontifical Catholic University of Valparaíso (LL.B)
- Profession: Lawyer

José María Pinedo Goycochea (22 August 1893−3 September 1971) was a Chilean politician who served as deputy.

Pinedo was professor at the Law Schools of the University of Chile (1934−1937) and the Pontifical Catholic University of Valparaíso, his alma mater.

He also was a member of the Chilean Bar Association, the Catholic Action of Valparaíso, and the Rotary Club, where he served as secretary for one term.

== Biography ==
He was born in Iquique, Chile, the son of Serafín Pinedo Gandazegui and Juana Goycoechea Ibarrán. He completed his early studies at the Seminary of Valparaíso and at the Colegio de los Sagrados Corazones of Valparaíso.

He later enrolled in the Faculty of Law of the Pontifical Catholic University of Valparaíso, qualifying as a lawyer on 18 April 1916. His graduation thesis was titled Comments on Article 193 of the Code of Civil Procedure.

He married Inés Navarrete Benítez in 1921, with whom he had seven children. In a second marriage, he married Carmen Navarro Arrau, and they had two children.

== Scholar career ==
He practiced law in Valparaíso until 1934. Alongside his legal practice, he developed an extensive academic career, teaching Constitutional Law, Commercial Law, and Administrative Law at the Colegio de los Sagrados Corazones. He also served as professor of Constitutional Law at the University of Chile campus in Valparaíso, and taught Labour Legislation at the Federico Santa María Technical University.

In Santiago, he joined the School of Law as an extraordinary professor of Constitutional Law in 1934. By 1937, he was teaching at the same institution as professor of the History of Constitutional Law. He also lectured on the History of Political Law and Oratory at the Air Force Academy.

== Political career ==
A member of the Conservative Party, he was elected deputy for the Twenty-third Departmental Electoral District (Osorno and Río Negro) for the legislative period 1941–1945. During his term, he served as a substitute member of the Standing Committee on Constitution, Legislation and Justice, as well as on the Committees on Public Education, Finance, Public Works and Roads, and Labour and Social Legislation.

He died in Santiago, Chile, on 3 September 1971.
