= Manuel Hinojosa =

Chilean politician

Ambassador of Chile at Dominican Republic
- In office 2008–2013
- President: Michelle Bachelet (2006−2010); Sebastián Piñera (2010−2014)

Personal details
- Education: Pontifical Catholic University of Valparaíso (BA); Catholic University of Leuven (MA)
- Occupation: Diplomat
- Profession: Geographer

Manuel Enrique Hinojosa Muñoz is a Chilean diplomat who served as ambassador of Chile in Bulgaria, Romania and the Dominican Republic.
