= Eduardo Cavieres =

Chilean historian (1945–2021)

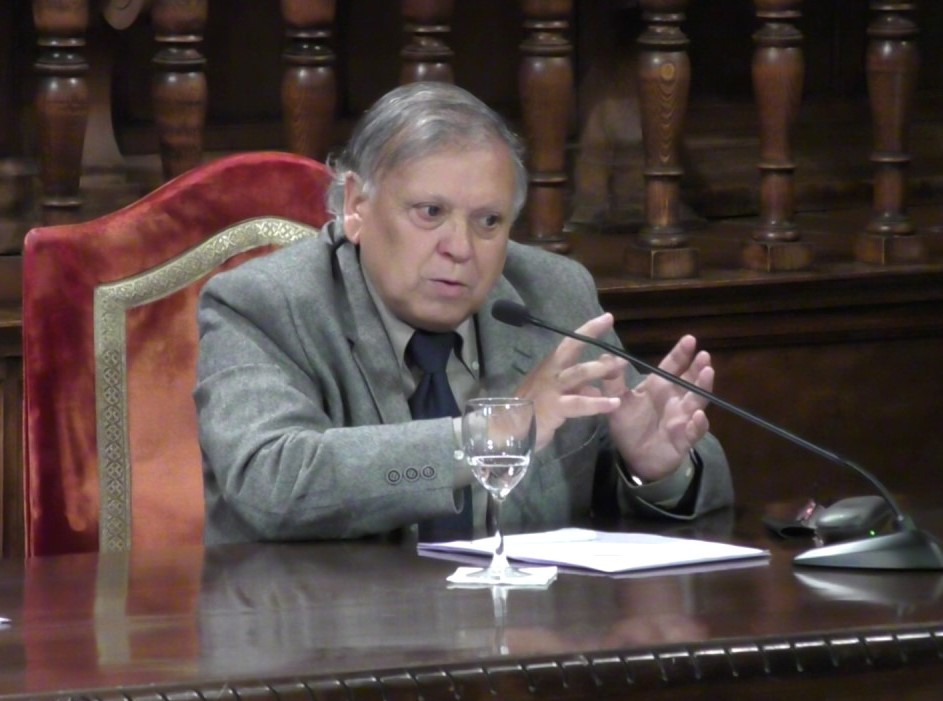

Director of the Institute of History, PUCV
- In office 1990–1993
- Preceded by: Héctor Herrera Cajas
- Succeeded by: Santiago Lorenzo

Personal details
- Born: 16 August 1945 Valparaíso, Chile
- Died: 12 December 2021 (aged 76) Santiago de Chile
- Occupations: Researcher; Historian

Academic background
- Education: Pontifical Catholic University of Valparaíso (BA); Madison University (MA); Essex University (PhD)

Eduardo Lincoyán Cavieres Figueroa (16 August 1945 − 12 December 2021) was a Chilean historian and academic who won the Chilean National History Award in 2008.

His greatest contributions were in the field of Social and Economic history of Chile during the eighteenth and nineteenth centuries. Likewise, he had collaborated in the social history of the Andean region shared by Bolivia, Peru and his country.

== Education ==
In 1976 he graduated as Historian at the History Institute of the Pontificia Universidad Católica de Valparaíso (PUCV). In 1982 he concluded his master's degree in history in the Madison University. Then, in 1987 he finished his PhD at Essex University.

== Career ==
He taught lessons at institutions the PUCV Institute of History, the University of Chile or the University of Playa Ancha.

On 22 November 2018, he was invested as an Emeritus Professor of his alma mater.

== Death ==
Cavieres died on 12 December 2021, at the age of 76.

== Works ==
=== Books ===
- Comercio chileno y comerciantes ingleses, 1820−1880 (1988)
- El comercio chileno en la economía. Mundo colonial (1996)
- Sociedad y mentalidades en perspectiva histórica (1998)
- Servir al Soberano sin detrimento del vasallo. El comercio hispano colonial y el sector mercantil de Santiago de Chile en el siglo XVIII (2003)
- Chile-Perú. La historia y la escuela. Conflictos nacionales, percepciones sociales (2006)
- Chile-Perú, Perú-Chile. Desarrollos políticos, económicos y culturales, 1820-1920 (2005)
- Del altiplano al desierto. La construcción de espacios y la gestación de un conflicto. Bolivia, Chile y Perú desde fines de la colonia a la primera mitad del siglo XIX (2007)
- Circulando mercaderías, construyendo una economía: Historia del comercio en Chile, siglos XVIII-XX. Del comercio colonial a los centros comerciales actuales (2010)
- Sobre la Independencia de Chile: el fin del Antiguo Régimen y los orígenes de la representación moderna (2012)
- El oficio del historiador: Entre pasados y futuros (2019)
- 2020 (antes y después): Persistencias de las desigualdades; fragilidad de las libertades (2020)

=== Articles ===
- Educación y sociedad en los inicios de la modernización en Chile, 1840-1880 (1989)
- Mercados y espacios extrarregionales en la economía chilena del siglo XVIII. Fuentes y perspectivas (1994)
- Liberalismo y financiamiento del Estado: Un problema secular. Chile, 1860-1930 (1996)
- Del crédito tradicional colonial al crédito moderno. Perspectivas y fuentes. Chile: El crédito de la periferia (1996)
- Expansión del capitalismo periférico en el Pacífico sur, siglo XIX. Crecimiento económico dependiente (1998)
- Medir y pensar la historia (1999)
- La organización de la Hacienda pública chilena, 1817-1822: Las bases de una experiencia exitosa ¿Ideas o decisiones? (2000)
- Anverso y reverso del liberalismo en Chile, 1840-1930 (2001)
- El sinceramiento de la vida privada y la recuperación de lo público, individuos, prácticas y familia a través de testamentos en Valparaíso de 1860 (2006)
- La historia regional en perspectivas historiográficas: problemas temáticos y metodológicos (2006)
- Desplazando el escenario: Los araucanos en el proceso de Independencia de Chile (2009)
- Francisco Bilbao. Análisis del texto y proyecciones temáticas: ayer y hoy, ¿es posible la integración latinoamericana? (2009)
- En busca de la identidad: Del autogobierno a la ruptura con España (2010)
- Lo deseado y lo ejecutado: Ideas y acciones, temas y problemas sobre la Independencia nacional, las representaciones y la construcción del Estado (2010)
- El Bicentenario en reflexiones temporales: el legado de 1810 y las responsabilidades de la historia (2010)
- Mercados y comercio informal en el Chile de la transición de Colonia a República (2011)
- Región y nación: Relaciones vecinales, historia e integración. Desafíos pendientes y tareas inconclusas (2013)
- ¿Neomalthusianismo o falta de desarrollo social?: A propósito de población y oportunidades en Arica en las últimas décadas (written along with Pablo Chávez Zúñiga) (2014)
- Las incertidumbres del tiempo en presente y la recuperación de la conciencia de ser (2016)
- La guerra de Chile contra la Confederación Perú-Boliviana (1836-1839): El trigo y la agricultura como bases de un proyecto nacional (written along with Gonzalo Serrano del Pozo) (2018)

== See also ==
- Héctor Herrera Cajas
