= Uqbar Editores =

Chilean publishing house

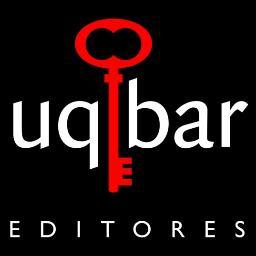
- Founded: 2006
- Founder: Isabel Buzeta Page
- Country of origin: Chile
- Headquarters location: Las Condes, Santiago
- Official website: Uqbar Editores Website

Uqbar Editores is a Chilean independent publishing company founded in 2006. Since its founding it has been characterized by the versatility of its catalog, which encompasses publications including specialist knowledge such as wealth bailout, without putting aside publishing trends of the market.

== History ==
Uqbar was established in the second half of 2006 under the publishing management of Isabel Buzeta, professor of languages and literature graduate, who had already worked at Random House Mondadori (now Penguin Random House Grupo Editorial, the Spanish language division of Penguin Random House), Grupo Editorial Norma, and Editorial Grijalbo. The publisher emerged from the necessity for Buzeta to link to projects which, for marketing reasons, would have been rejected by transnational publishing groups.

The name of Uqbar Editores is a homage to the story "Tlön, Uqbar, Orbis Tertius" by Argentinian writer Jorge Luis Borges.

== Collections and imprints ==
Uqbar possesses collections of cinema, fiction, architecture, politics, historical accounts, journalism and psychology. It also distributes works of other Chilean publishers, such as Sangría Edioria and Ediciones Kultrún.

== Publications ==
2014

No.	Title	Author
1	Señales del Dresden	Martín Pérez Ibarra

2013

No.	Title	Author
1	2323 Stratford ave.	Marcelo Rioseco
2	Movimientos sociales en Chile	Gabriel Salazar
3	Para gritar, para cantar, para llorar. Mundiales inolvidables	Bárbara Fuentes, Marcelo Simonetti
4	Historia de una mujer bomba y otras crónicas de América Latina	Benjamín Galemiri
5	No acceptes caramelos de extraños	Andrea Jeftanovic
6	Apuntes para la Historia de la Cocina Chilena	Eugenio Pereira Salas
7	(Des)montando fábulas	Pedro Chaskel
8	Golpe, 11 de septiembre de 1973. Las 24 horas más dramáticas del siglo 20	Ascanio Cavallo, Margarita Serrano
9	Historia de mi madre muerta	Ascanio Cavallo
10	El poder de la paradoja	Ascanio Cavallo
11	La viga maestra y el sueldo de Chile, mirando el futuro con los ojos del cobre	Patricio Meller
12	Entrevista de golpe	Bárbara Fuentes
13	Matrimonio y Patrimonio / Las estrategias matrimoniales de la elite económica chilena actual	Sebastián Huneeus

2012

No.	Title	Author
1	Confianza lúcida	José Andrés Murillo
2	Shakespearean Blues	Armando Roa
3	Taller de escritura de telenovelas. 8 clases teóricas y ejercicios	José Ignacio Valenzuela
4	Abierta: Gestión de controversias y justificaciones	Eugenio Tironi
5	¿Por qué no me quieren?: Del Piñera way a la rebelión de los estudiantes	Eugenio Tironi
6	Universitarios, el problema no es el lucro, es el mercado	Patricio Meller
7	Cuaderno de recetas	Pilar Hurtado y Pilar Larraín
8	La historia oculta del régimen militar	Ascanio Cavallo, Manuel Salazar, Óscar Sepúlveda
9	Al alba de las emociones	Susana Bloch
10	Surfeando la ola emocional	Susana Bloch
11	El arte de sanar en la medicina mapuche	Ziley Mora
12	Palabras mágicas para reencantar la tierra	Ziley Mora
13	La historia oculta de la transición. Memoria de una época 1990-1998	Ascanio Cavallo
14	Movimientos sociales en Chile	Gabriel Salazar
15	Ponte tus pantalones, súbete a tus tacos	Ximena Torres Cautivo
16	Horóscopo 2013	Bárbara Canale
17	América Latina en 130 documentales	Jorge Ruffinelli
