= Umberto Laffi =

Italian historian

- Born: 25 August 1939 (age 87); Belluno, Italy
- Citizenship: Italian
- Education: Università di Pisa (B.A. in history, 1953)
- Scientific career
- Fields: History of Rome; History of Greece; Cultural history Art history

Umberto Laffi (born 25 August 1939) is an Italian historian.

He has been named as Emeritus Professor at Università di Pisa where he has taught History of Greece, History of Rome or Latin Epigraphy. He is also a member of the Accademia Nazionale dei Lincei.

== Works ==
- Adtributio e contributio. Problemi del sistema politico-amministrativo dello stato romano. Pisa: Nistri.Lischi. 1966.
- M. Pasquinucci (ed.). Storia di Ascoli Piceno nell'età antica (= Asculum I). Pisa: Nistri.Lischi. 1975.
- Ricerche antiquarie e falsificazioni ad Ascoli Piceno nel secondo Ottocento (= Asculum II.2). Pisa: Nistri-Lischi. 1982.
- E. Gabba, ed. (2000). Sociedad y política en la Roma republicana (siglos III-I a.C.). Pisa: Pacini Editore.
- Studi di storia romana e di diritto. Roma: Eizioni di Storia e Letteratura. 2001.
- Kodai Roma to Italia/Roma antica e l'Italia (raccolta di saggi tradotti in giapponese. Pisa: ETA. 2003.
- Colonie e municipi nello stato romano. Roma: Edizioni di Storia e Letteratura. 2007.
- Emilio Gabba, ed. (2009). Conversazione sulla storia. Pisa-Cagliari: Della Porta editori.
- Il trattato fra Sardi ed Efeso degli anni 90 a.C. Fabrizio Serra Editore. 2010.
- In greco per i Greci. Ricerche sul lessico greco del processo civile e criminale romano nelle attestazioni di fonti documentarie romane. Roma: IUSS Press. 2013.

== See also ==
- Pontifical Catholic University of Valparaíso
- PUCV Institute of History
- Héctor Herrera Cajas
