= Alfonso Muga =

Chilean politician

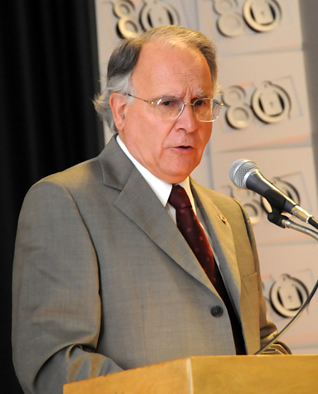

Head of the Pontifical Catholic University of Valparaíso
- In office 1998 – 26 July 2010
- Preceded by: Bernardo Donoso
- Succeeded by: Claudio Elórtegui Raffo

Personal details
- Born: 2 June 1944 (age 82) Rancagua, Chile
- Party: None
- Spouse: María Cristina Urquiza
- Children: Two
- Education: Pontifical Catholic University of Valparaíso (BA); University of Chile (MA)
- Occupation: Researcher and Scholar
- Profession: Economist

Alfonso Muga Naredo (born 2 June 1944) is a Chilean scholar and researcher who served as head of the Pontifical Catholic University of Valparaíso (1998−2010).
