= Fotios Malleros =

Greek historian and philologist

- Born: Fotios Malleros Kasimatis; 1914; Athens, Greece
- Died: 1986 (aged 71–72); Santiago, Chile
- Occupations: Historian, writer, scholar

Education
- Education: University of Athens

Fotios Malleros Kasimatis (1914–1986) was a Greek historian, philologist and scholar specialist in Byzantinology. His academic career was mainly developed in Chile.

== Biography ==
He studied at University of Athens, graduating there as a philologist and historian. Juan Gómez Millas, a Chilean politician then Universidad de Chile Faculty of Philosophy and Letters Dean, arrived his country in 1947. Initially he taught there, at the Pedagogical Institute, teaching courses on Greek language, history and literature. Although in Chile there was already, since colonial times, a remarkable academic dedication around Classical Age themes, the specific study of Byzantium had not reached the depth that it achieved with Malleros' work and academic activity, who dedicated his life to Byzantinology, both through the publication of specialized books and articles, as well as outreach and extension works, including conferences and even broadcasting programs.

His work played a central role so that Byzantinology main works published in Europe and United States were known in Chile, where until then were practically unknown in its intellectual circles.

His book's publication, The Byzantine Empire, 395–1204, marked a milestone for Latin American Byzantinology, since for the first time there was a manual on the history of Byzantium in Spanish and published in Latin America. The book was transformed into a standard didactic work and was republished in 1987.

He collaborated in 1953 in carrying out the first extension course on the subject (under the title "Byzantium and Western Culture") at Pontificia Universidad Católica de Valparaíso. Likewise, in 1958, five hundred six years after Fall of Constantinople, he held the first Byzantine Week sponsored by that institution.

In 1968, Malleros promoted the creation of Universidad de Chile Center for Greek, Byzantine and Neohellenic Studies. This university institution, which has been officially named after it since 1998, receives sponsorship from Greek state through an annual contribution to its financing. Initially, that contribution was managed by himself. The center, which has a library of several thousand volumes, mostly in greek language, has edited several works on its area of study, in addition to publishing magazine Byzantion Nea Hellás.

== See also ==
- Héctor Herrera Cajas
- Miguel Castillo Didier
