= National Television Council (Chile) =

Agency of Chilean government

- Consejo Nacional de Televisión
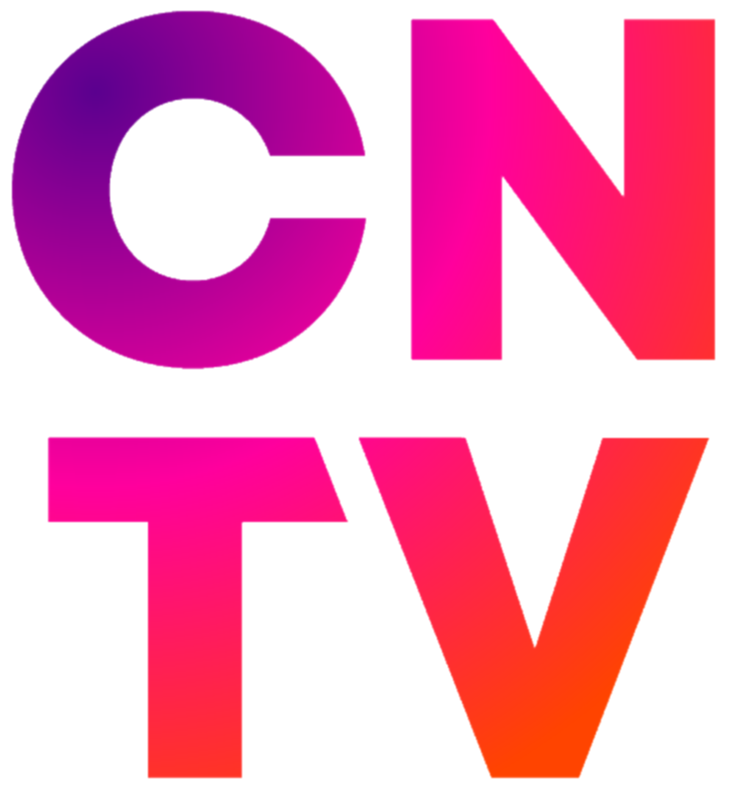

Agency overview
- Formed: 24 October 1970
- Jurisdiction: National
- Headquarters: Mar del Plata 2147; Providencia, Santiago
- Annual budget: US$21,030,236; CLP$9,684,519,000
- Agency executive: Catalina Parot, President
- Parent agency: Ministry General Secretariat of Government
- Website: CNTV official website

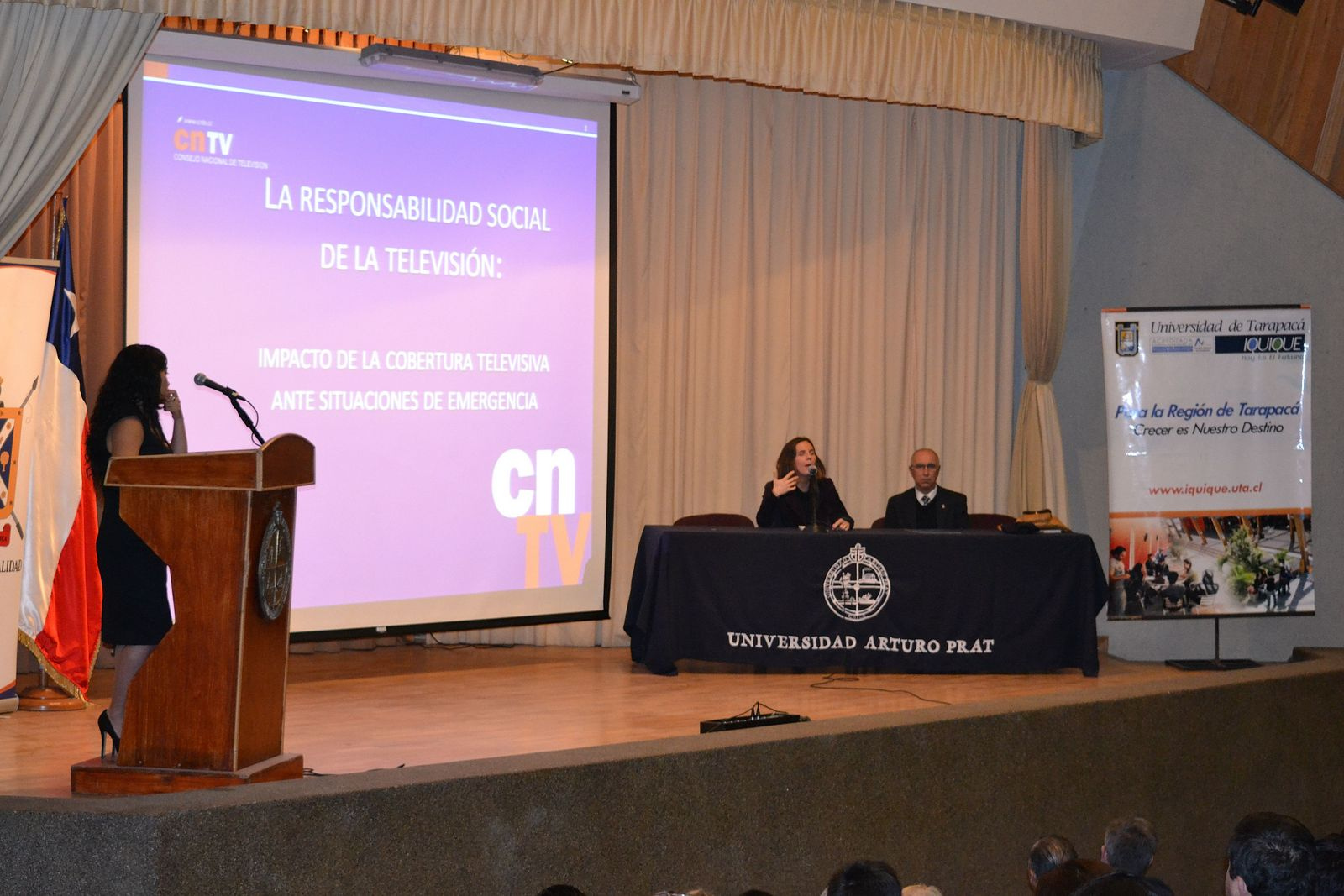
Council panel forum held in Iquique.

The National Television Council (Spanish: Consejo Nacional de Televisión or CNTV) is a Chilean government agency whose function is to oversee the operation of television services.

It was first created by Law 17377 on October 24, 1970. Its existence is formalized in the Constitution of Chile, with its composition, organization, and powers defined in Law 18838 of 1989 and Law 19131 of 1992.

Since 2001, it has participated in creating the contents of CNTV Infantil, an educational channel for cable television.

== Composition ==
=== 1970—1989 ===
After the passage of Law 17377 in 1970, the council was composed of:

- The minister of public education, who acted as the president of the council.
- A representative of the president of the Republic, of his free choice.
- Three representatives, not members of Congress, elected by the Senate, in a single election where each member had a single vote and the three parties with the highest vote total were elected.
- Three representatives, not members of Congress, elected by the Chamber of Deputies in the same manner as above.
- Two representatives of the Supreme Court, selected by it.
- The rector of the University of Chile.
- The rector of the Pontifical Catholic University of Chile.
- The rector of the Pontifical Catholic University of Valparaíso.
- The president of the board of directors of Televisión Nacional de Chile.
- A representative of the workers of Televisión Nacional and another of the workers of the three existing university channels (Canal 9, Canal 13 and UCV Televisión).

Decree Law 113 of October 29, 1973, modified the composition of the council by eliminating the representatives of the Senate and the Chamber of Deputies (due to the dissolution of the National Congress after the coup d'état of September 11) and the representatives of the workers of TVN and the university channels.

=== 1989—1992 ===
Law 18838 of September 30, 1989, established that the Council be composed of:

- The president of the council, appointed by the president of the republic with the consent of the Senate.
- A representative of the president of the republic, of his free choice.
- A representative of the Supreme Court, appointed by the latter, and who has served as minister of the court or lawyer of the same.
- Two representatives of the commanders-in-chief of the Armed Forces and the general director of the Carabineros.
- Two representatives of Chilean universities, appointed by their rectors. The rectors of those universities that, directly or indirectly, were concessionaires of television services could not participate in the appointment of directors.

=== 1992 to the present ===
Currently, after the reforms introduced by Law 19131 of 1992, the CNTV must be composed of 11 members, one of whom, appointed by the president of the republic, presides over the council. The rest are designated by agreement of the Senate. The directors must be persons of relevant personal and professional merits. In addition, the law requires pluralism both in the selection of directors and in the functioning of the body.

==== Current members (as of November 2025) ====
- Mauricio Muñoz (president)
- Andrés Egaña
- Francisco Cruz
- Daniela Catrileo
- Beatrice Ávalos
- Hernán Viguera
- Bernardita del Solar
- María de los Ángeles Covarrubias
- Constanza Tobar
- Gastón Gómez

==== Presidents ====
- Alfonso Márquez de la Plata (September 30, 1989–April 20, 1992)
- José Joaquín Brunner (April 20, 1992–September 20, 1994)
- Pilar Armanet (October 10, 1994–April 12, 2000)
- Bernardo Donoso (April 12, 2000–May 7, 2001)
- Patricia Politzer (May 7, 2001–March 27, 2006)
- Belisario Velasco (June 19, 2006–July 13, 2006)
- Jorge Navarrete Martínez (August 31, 2006–December 17, 2010)
- Herman Chadwick (December 17, 2010–September 8, 2014)
- Óscar Reyes (September 8, 2014–April 11, 2018)
- Catalina Parot (April 11, 2018–)

== Criticism and controversies ==
Due to its power, the council has been accused of being an archaic, conservative and obsolete body for modern times. Lately, it has also been accused of censoring content on television.
