= Nelson Vásquez =

Chilean chancellor

Head of the Pontifical Catholic University of Valparaíso
- Incumbent
- Assumed office 26 July 2022
- Preceded by: Claudio Elórtegui Raffo

Personal details
- Born: Nelson Vásquez Lara Chile
- Education: Pontifical Catholic University of Valparaíso (Lic., 1991) (MA, 2003); University of Barcelona (PhD, 2004)
- Occupation: Teacher, historian Scholar

Nelson Vásquez Lara is a Chilean historian who is the current chancellor of the Pontifical Catholic University of Valparaíso.

After serving as a lecturer and staff member at the PUCV Institute of History (PUCV) during the 1990s and 2000s, in 2009 he was promoted to Dean of the Faculty of Philosophy and Education of that university. Afterwards, he assumed the position of Vice-Rector between 2010 and 2022, credentials that later allowed him to reach the Rectorship of his alma mater.

He has been a columnist for media outlets such as El Mostrador and the “Observatorio de Historia y Política,” a platform connected to the current affairs division of the Institute of History of his alma mater. In these spaces, he has frequently reflected on the role that universities should play in the 21st century amid the digital era that defines their context.

== Biography ==
Vásquez began his academic career in 1992 after earning a bachelor’s degree in historiography (1990) and a teaching credential in History and Geography (1991). He thus joined the academic staff of the Institute of History at PUCV during the 1990s, where he served as Head of Extension of the Institute from 1996 to 1999, in addition to coordinating teaching practicums. By the end of that decade, he also held the position of Head of Teaching at the Institute of History (1999–2000).

In 2003, he completed his Master’s degree in History at his alma mater, which he combined with his doctoral studies in Didactics of History and the Social Sciences (2004) at the University of Barcelona, completed one year after earning his master’s.

After obtaining his doctorate, he became a tenured professor at PUCV, from which position he again contributed to the coordination of teaching practicums between 2003 and 2008. Two years later, with the arrival of Claudio Elórtegui Raffo as rector, Vásquez collaborated in Elórtegui’s three successive terms (2010–2022) as Vice-Rector.

On 26 July 2022, Vásquez officially took office as Rector of his alma mater, the Pontifical Catholic University of Valparaíso.
