= Susana Bloch =

German Chilean research psychologist

- Born: 1931 (age 93–94); Berlin, Germany
- Other names: Susana Bloch Arendt
- Education: University of Chile; Harvard University; Boston University
- Occupation: Experimental psychologist
- Organizations: University of Chile; French National Centre for Scientific Research; Pierre and Marie Curie University
- Known for: Alba Emoting
- Website: albaemoting.cl

Susana Bloch Arendt (born 1931) is a German Chilean research psychologist whose focus is in neurophysiology and psychophysiology. She is known for creating Alba Emoting, a psychophysiological technique that allows a person to consciously induce, express, and change in and out of basic emotions.

== Early life and education ==
Susana Bloch was born in Berlin, Germany, in 1931 and emigrated with her family to Santiago, Chile in 1936. She studied at the University of Chile in Santiago and was graduated in 1960 with teaching degrees in psychology and English. She then pursued graduate studies at Harvard University and Boston University.

== Research and career ==
Bloch began her career as a visiting professor in experimental psychology and neuroscience applied to the study of animals, at Harvard University and Boston University, as well as at the University of São Paulo. By 1970 Bloch was a full professor of neurophysiology in the department of psychology at the University of Chile in Santiago. She also was a research associate in the department of physiology at the University of Chile Faculty of Medicine.

When the department of theater at the University of Chile invited Bloch to teach a psychology course to their students, she proposed an experimental research workshop in emotions instead. The workshop moved forward, and drama professor Pedro Orthous and neurophysiologist Guy Santibáñez joined her. During this collaboration they discovered "emotional effector patterns" and named their work the "BOS Method" (after their surname initials). The Chilean coup d'état on 11 September 1973 brought an end to their studies. Bloch moved to France, Santibáñez moved to a different country, and Orthous died the following year.

In 1974, Bloch became director of research at the French National Centre for Scientific Research (CNRS) in Paris, France. She created her laboratory at the Pierre and Marie Curie University, where she worked for 23 years.

In her ongoing research in the psychophysiology of human emotions, Bloch reworked and refined the BOS Method. While collaborating with filmmaker and writer Pedro Sándor, she renamed the method to "Alba Emoting". The new name evolved after they worked together on Lorca's The House of Bernarda Alba while using the method. "Alba" was chosen because in Spanish it means both "dawn" and "white", by which Bloch says the ideas of "aurora" and "purity" are reflected. The choice of "Emoting", from the English verb "to emote", was selected by Bloch during collaboration with an American colleague. (Note: The term "emoting" also is used in the title of a film directed by Sándor about research of emotional effector patterns.) The refined method and collaboration with Sándor enabled Bloch to bring her discoveries beyond the laboratory and into the theater.

Bloch eventually returned to Chile, where she continues to teach, develop new practical applications, and write.

== Alba Emoting ==
Alba Emoting allows a person to induce, express, and modulate in and out of six basic emotions using posture, facial expression, and breathing patterns.

In a 2020 scientific journal article, Juan Pablo Kalawski, a clinical psychologist trained in Alba Emoting, writes that recent theoretical and empirical work suggests that anger, fear, sadness, joy, eroticism, and tenderness "are distinct emotions and that each includes a specific respiratory, postural, and/or facial pattern".

Bloch explains in her book, entitled The Alba of Emotions, that her process allows a person the ability to recognize emotions "accurately, without confusion, and to express them genuinely, just as children do".

Each emotion has its own set of bodily responses that Bloch calls "emotional effector patterns". By reproducing these patterns through breathing, posture, and facial expression, a person can experience and express genuine emotion at will, without having to recall personal memories or images.

With a seventh pattern called a "step-out", a person can exit any emotion and return to a neutral state. This ability is considered central to safe emotional practice.

By 1995, Bloch had certified the earliest Alba Emoting trainers to teach independently. She organized the training into six levels. Levels 1 (self-use/practitioner) and 2 (teaching apprentice) as student level; while levels 3, 4, 5, and 6 graduate to certified teaching levels.

Certified instruction by Bloch grew organically, then organized as the group, Alba Emoting North America. It is currently certified by the Alba Method Association.

=== Alba Emoting and actors ===
Primarily, Alba Emoting has been a tool for actors and directors, introduced through private lessons, theater workshops, and becoming part of the applied skills curriculum for some drama teachers. For them, it is a purely physical alternative to emotion memory and other psychological techniques for releasing, maintaining, and controlling emotional states on stage. "Actors can learn to control the levels and intensities of these emotions, enter and leave an emotional state at will", the description of a workshop advertised for actors in 2012 explains, "all without the use of personal memories to trigger the emotional state".

Illinois Wesleyan University theater professor and director, Nancy Loitz became a certified teacher after training with Bloch during a 1992 sabbatical in South America and has used the technique with casts of plays she directs.

Australian actress Louise Siversen described her experience with the method in a 2014 radio interview. "You can step in and out of it incredibly quickly", she said, "[s]o it's protecting the psyche of the actor. Because actually the seventh primary state is called step out, and... This is the neutral state: breathing in through the nose and out through the mouth, looking towards the horizon line, softening the eyes, you can get out of any state that you're in, regardless of how intense it may be. And you're completely free of it, because it is purely a physical state."

The principles of the method have begun to interest people in other fields. Computer graphics animators have started to recognize how acting skills can enhance emotional states and responses in their animations. In those crossover studies, some texts teach animators to combine understanding of Alba Emoting with the likes of Bioenergetic analysis, essences, Laban Effort Shapes, classic training in voice-over acting, lip sync, foundations of Commedia dell'arte, and Michael Chekhov and Konstantin Stanislavski methods. As the authors of the 2009 text Action! Acting Lessons for CG Animators say, "Countless acting theories have been developed to capture, control, and maintain emotion. For the animator, this trouble is compounded by the fact that they must create the sense of emotion in an inanimate object, imbuing something nonliving with the subtle signs of human emotion."

Bloch says in her 2017 book, entitled Alba Emoting: A Scientific Method for Emotional Induction, that beyond science, theater, film, and visual arts, she believes "there is a large new world open for exploration" in other possible applications of her method. Some examples she gives of how it might be used are in publicity, organizational development, and psychotherapy.

== Published works ==
=== Journal articles ===
Bloch is the author of more than 100 scientific publications on topics such as visual perception, the role of the cerebral cortex in learning, and the psychophysiology of human emotions. Articles include:

- Bloch, S.; Silva, A. (1959). "Factors involved in the acquisition of a maze habit, analyzed by means of tranquilizing and sedative drugs". Journal of Comparative and Physiological Psychology. 52 (5): 550–554. doi:10.1037/h0043560. PMID 13801512.
- Bloch-Rojas, S.; Toro, A.; Pinto-Hamuy, T. (1964). "Cardiac versus somatomotor conditioned responses in neodecorticated rats". Journal of Comparative and Physiological Psychology. 58 (2): 233–236. doi:10.1037/h0043193. PMID 14215395.
- Bloch, S.; Rey, J; Martinoya, C. (1981). "Visual acuity as a function of distance for frontal and lateral viewing in the pigeon". Sensory Functions: 471–476. doi:10.1016/B978-0-08-027337-2.50059-6. ISBN 9780080273372. S2CID 126852092.
- Bloch, S.; Martinoya, C. (1982). "Comparing frontal and lateral viewing in the pigeon. I. Tachistoscopic visual acuity as a function of distance". Behavioural Brain Research. 5 (3): 231–244. doi:10.1016/0166-4328(82)90031-6. PMID 7115567. S2CID 13328073.
- Bloch, S.; Martinoya, C. (1983). "Specialization of Visual Functions for Different Retinal Areas in the Pigeon". Advances in Vertebrate Neuroethology. pp. 359–368. doi:10.1007/978-1-4684-4412-4_18. ISBN 978-1-4684-4414-8. S2CID 117271601.
- Bloch, S.; Rivaud, S.; Martinoya, C. (1984). "Comparing frontal and lateral viewing in the pigeon. III. Different patterns of eye movements for binocular and monocular fixation". Behavioural Brain Research. 13 (2): 173–182. doi:10.1016/0166-4328(84)90147-5. PMID 6487407. S2CID 9549452.
- Bloch, S.; Lemeignan, M.; Martinoya, C. (1987). "Coordinated vergence for frontal fixation, but independent eye movements for lateral viewing, in the pigeon". Eye Movements from Physiology to Cognition: 47–56. doi:10.1016/B978-0-444-70113-8.50009-6. ISBN 9780444701138. S2CID 130201419.
- Bloch, S.; Lemeignan, M.; Aguilera-T, N. (1991). "Specific respiratory patterns distinguish among human basic emotions". International Journal of Psychophysiology. 11 (2): 141–154. doi:10.1016/0167-8760(91)90006-J. PMID 1748589. S2CID 4293802.
- Lemeignan, M.; Aguilera-T, N.; Bloch, S. (1992). "Emotional effector patterns: recognition of expressions". Cahiers de Psychologie Cognitive. S2CID 151606857.

=== Books ===
Books authored by Bloch include:

- 1996, 1998, 2014 Biología del Emocionar y Alba Emoting, Bailando Juntos (Humberto Maturana R., Co-Author) Santiago de Chile: Dolmen Ediciones Re-edición: Uqbar Editores (2014)
- 2002, 2011 Al Alba de las Emociones: Respiracion y Manejo de las Emociones Random House Mondadori (2002) Uqbar Editores (2011)
- 2002 Alba Emoting: Bases científicas del Emocionar Santiago de Chile: Editorial Universitaria
- 2003 The Development of Alba Emoting (Hyrum Conrad, Editor) Brigham Young University Press
- 2008 Surfeando La Ola Emocional Uqbar Editores
- 2017 Alba Emoting: A Scientific Method for Emotional Induction (Patricia Angelin, Editor, Introduction; Elizabeth Townsend, Editor; Pedro Sándor, Introduction) CreateSpace (English translation of the 2002 Al Alba de las Emociones)

== Recognition, honors, and awards ==
In the history of Chilean psychology, the pioneering role of women during the second half of the twentieth century has only begun to be recognized. At the University of Chile, Bloch was part of a team of researchers that included Vera Kardonsky, María de los Ángeles Saavedra, and Teresa Pinto, as well as Carlos Descouvieres and Guy Santibáñez. In a 2015 article, one interviewee remembered: "I think that all of that little group are the ones who transformed the vision of biology and psychobiology in the school." (Translated from Spanish)

Honors and awards Bloch has received include:

- National Psychology Prize awarded in 2010 by the Chilean College of Psychologists
- Life Care Award given in 2016 by the IST Work Safety Institute in Chile
