= Miguel Castillo Didier =

Chilean hellenist, translator, scholar and musicologist

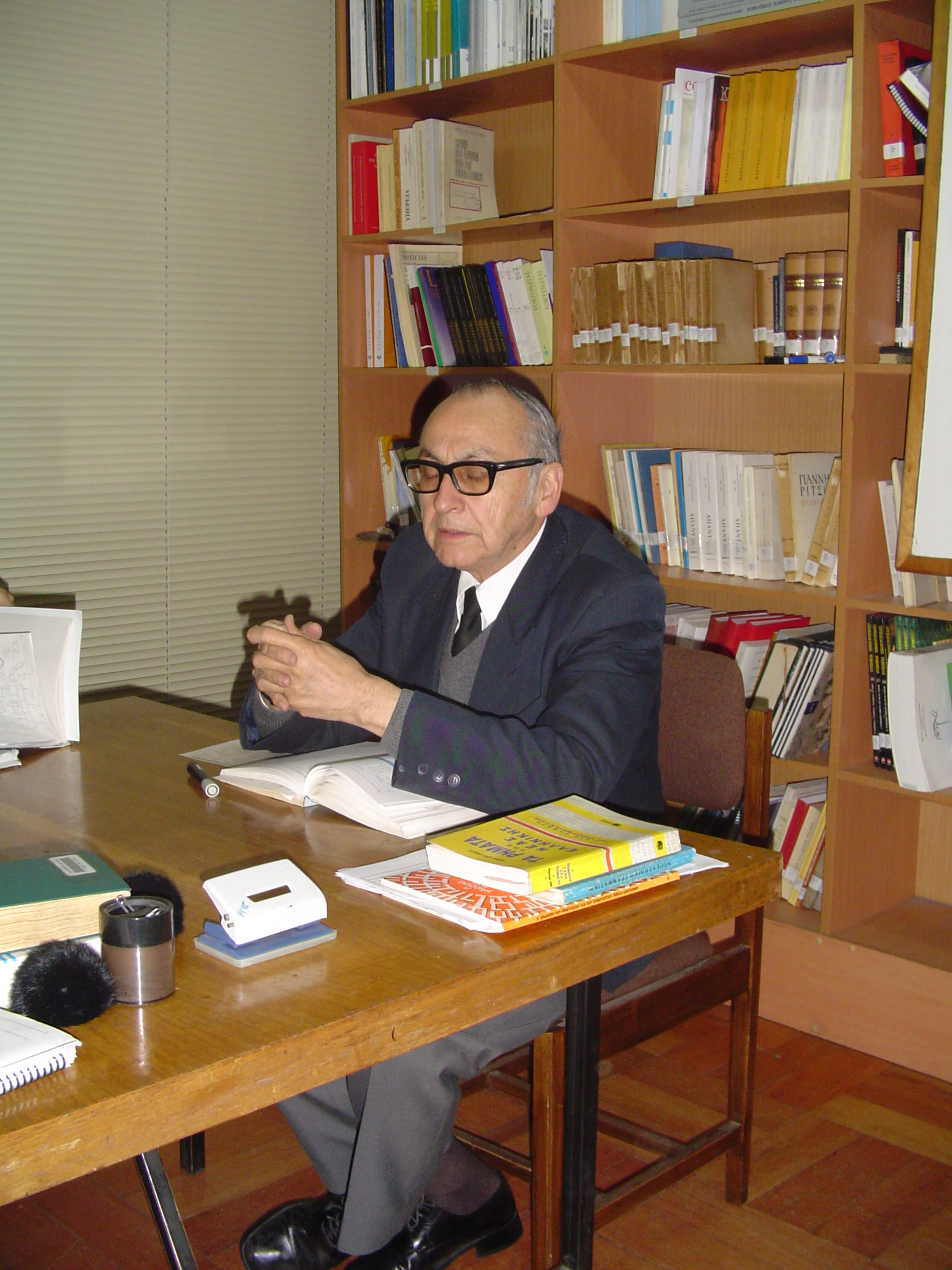

Director of the Universidad de Chile Center for Byzantine and Neohellenic Studies
- Incumbent
- Assumed office 1993
- Preceded by: Alejandro Zorbas Daskalakis

Personal details
- Born: 14 April 1934 (age 92) Chile
- Education: University of Chile (BA)
- Occupation: Researcher
- Profession: Historian

Miguel Castillo Didier

Miguel Ángel Castillo Didier (born 14 April 1934) is a Chilean hellenist, translator, scholar and musicologist.

Castillo Didier has been recognized as one of the most prestigious translators of the poets Constantine P. Cavafy, Giorgos Seferis and Nikos Kazantzakis, so his work is also recognized and awarded by the Greek government itself.

== Biography ==
He was born in Santiago, Chile.

During Augusto Pinochet's regime, he was exiled in Venezuela.

On 27 March 2012, the State of Chile, on National Council for Culture and the Arts behalf, awarded Castillo the Pablo Neruda Order of Artistic and Cultural Merit in National Library of Chile dependencies.

== Publications ==
- Grecia y Francisco de Miranda. Precursor, héroe y martir de las Independencia Hispanoamericana. Santiago: University of Chile, 1995.

== See also ==
- Fotios Malleros
- Héctor Herrera Cajas
- Universidad de Chile Center for Byzantine and Neohellenic Studies
