= University of Chile Center for Byzantine and Neohellenic Studies =

The Universidad de Chile Center for Byzantine and Neohellenic Studies is an institution which for over fifty years has been dedicated to the study of Greek history and culture. The centre is located in Santiago and operates within the Universidad de Chile system. Since its founding, the center has been headquartered at the Greek Pavilion, a building donated to Universidad de Chile by Messrs. Gabriel and Jorge Mustakis Dragonas, General Consuls of Greece in Santiago and Valparaíso, respectively. Since 1998, the institution's official name is Centro de Estudios Griegos Bizantinos y Neohelénicos Fotios Malleros. The centre's research field and teaching extends to Greek culture's three great social and political stages: Ancient, Byzantine and Neo-Greek.

The institute has been a mainstay in relations between Chile and Greece.

== History ==
The centre was founded in 1968 as the Centro de Estudios Bizantinos y Neohelénicos, under the Dean of the Faculty of Philosophy and Humanities, Hernán Ramírez Necochea. Its founding professors were Fotios Malleros (1914–1986), Héctor Herrera Cajas (1930–1997), Alejandro Zorbas and Miguel Castillo Didier (1934–present).

In 1972, the institution published Herrera Cajas's thesis on the Byzantine Empire's international relations during the migration period. Its release was a milestone. In the words of Medieval History PhD José Marín: "It is a study of great intellectual rigor, with an impeccable critical apparatus in which all existing sources for the subject are cited and commented; in short, it is a highest-level research effort which has deservedly placed its author among the most important Byzantinists of second half of the 20th century" Considering that German historian Günther Weiss included it in his specialized bibliographic repertoire. Likewise, Günter Weiβ pointed out: "On Byzantine and Neohellenic Studies Centre publication in Santiago, scholar Professor Héctor Herrera Cajas presents all the important (Byzantine) diplomatic relations during a period of great migrations, treated from the Persian border to the Danube. The text is worked directly from sources and illustrates very well each moment's political background. Byzantine diplomacy oscillates between demand for universality, and at its harshest is often painful and distressing".

Among its most important members, Miguel Castillo Didier, was honored by the Chilean Ministry of Culture and Arts to recognize his over 160 works on Greek studies and musicology through this study center, which have been translated into English, French and Greek.
