= Pelequén =

Town in Chile

Coordinates: 34°28′S 70°55′W

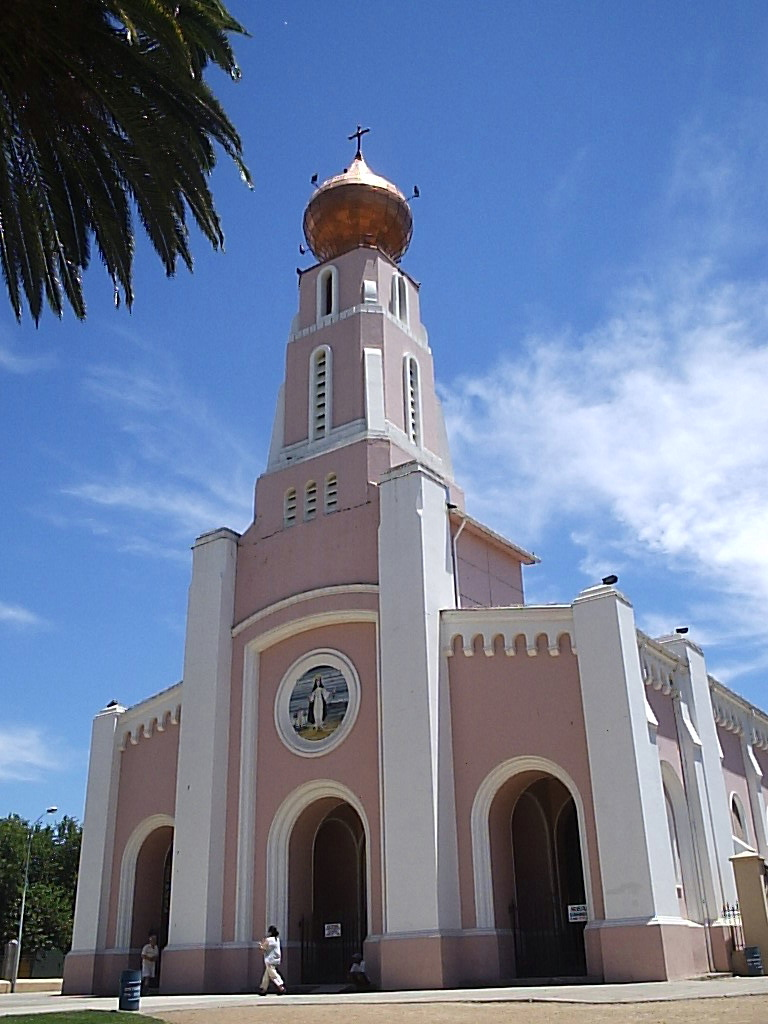
Saint Rose of Pelequén Sanctuary

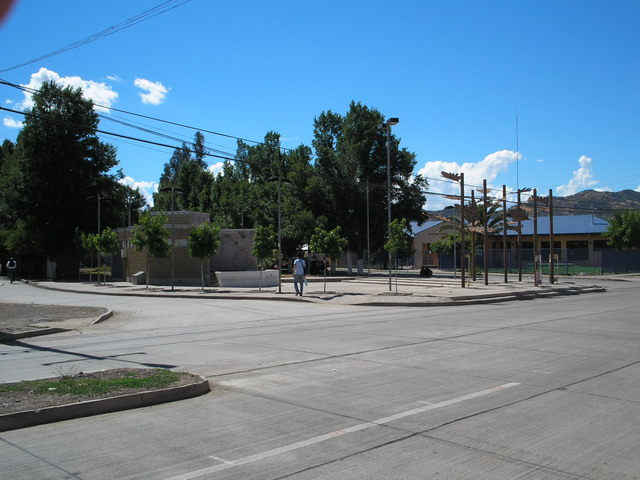
Pelequén's streets

Pelequén is a Chilean town located in the commune of Malloa, O'Higgins Region. Pelequén is 41 km southwest of the city of Rancagua.

== Culture ==
Pelequén is famous for the religious festivity in honor of Saint Rose of Lima, whose image is in the Sanctuary of the locality.

== Economy ==
The town's economy is based mainly on wine production, agriculture and handicrafting. There are several wineries in the area, including the Adventura Winery which was opened in 2023 by the Morandé Wine Group.

In 2025, a fruit fly eradication campaign was organised by local government to protect agriculture.

== See also ==
- List of towns in Chile
