= Eugenio Pereira Salas =

Chilean historian

Eugenio Pereira Salas (May 19, 1904 - November 17, 1979) was a Chilean historian. He was president of the Academia Chilena de la Historia from 1962 until his death in 1979.

== Works ==
- The origins of Musical Art in Chile (1941)
- Colonial Games and Joys in Chile (1947)
- Notes on the History of Chilean Cuisine (1943)
- Bibliographical Guide to the Study of Chilean Folklore (1952)
- Pepe Vila. The Zarzuela Girl in Chile (1952)
- South America. Peru - Bolivia - Paraguay - Argentina - Chile. National Period (1956)
- History of Music in Chile (1850 - 1900) (1957)
- Art History in the Kingdom of Chile (1965)
- The First Contacts Between Chile and the United States, 1778 - 1808 (1971)
- Theatre History in Chile From its Origins to the Death of John Casacuberta, one thousand eight hundred forty-eight (1974)
- Notes on the History of Chilean Cuisine (1977)
- Biobibliography Musical Backgrounds into Chile from 1886 (1978)
- Research on the History of Art in Chile Republican (1992, posthumous)
