= Maitencillo =

Town in Chile

- Town
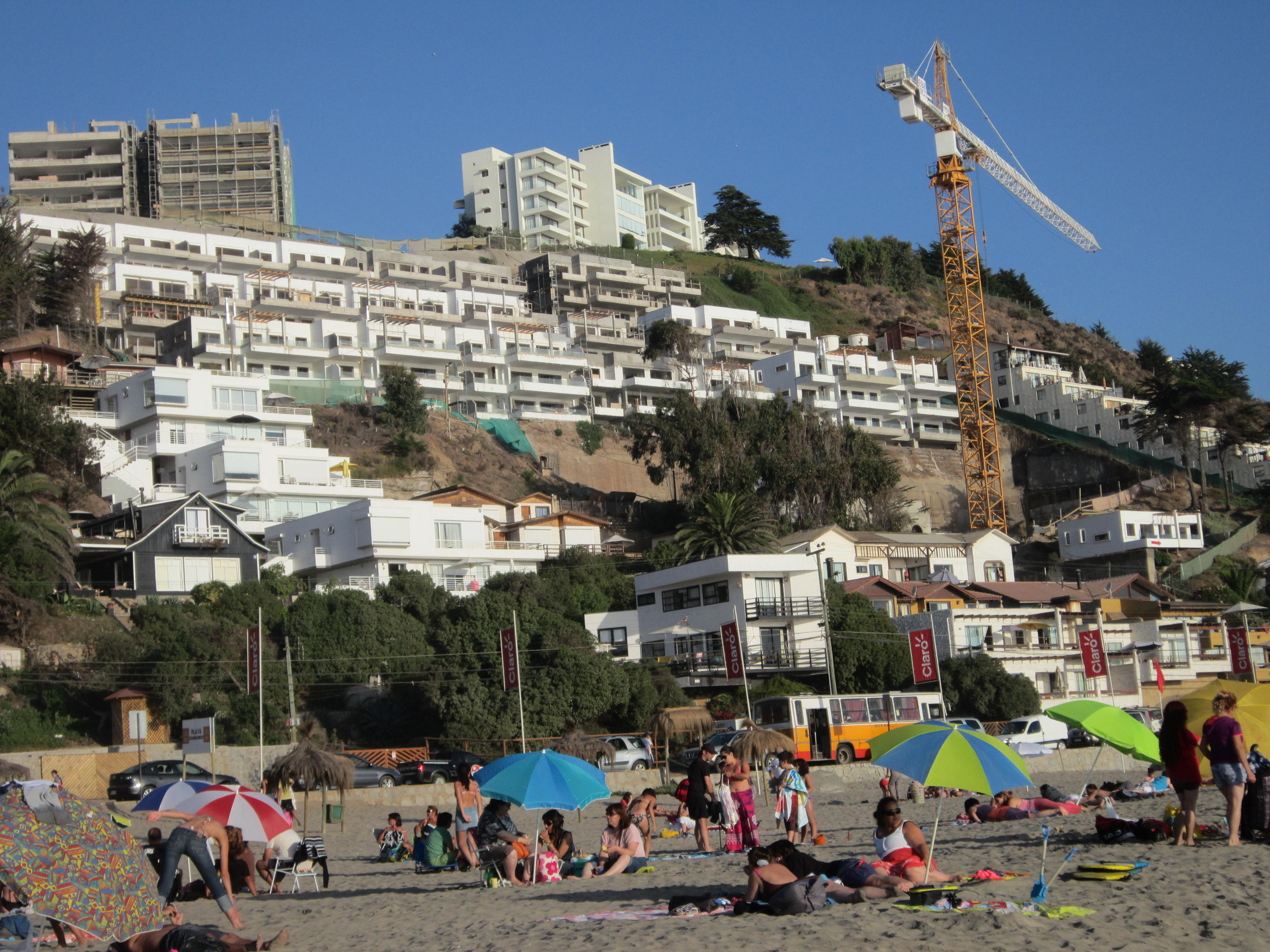
- Interactive map of Maitencillo
- Country: Chile
- Region: Valparaiso
- Province: Valparaiso
- Commune: Puchuncaví

Population (2024)
  - Total: 2,554

Maitencillo is a town located in the Valparaiso Region of Chile, about 57km north of Viña del Mar. The town's coast is divided in 7 beaches, which are known for having optimal conditions for surfing and kayaking, making the town a popular tourist destination, with the town´s population increasing from 1,300 to 12,000 during high tourist season. It is the longest and narrowest "Balneario" of the Valparaiso region.

In November 2026, the first formal drinking water network was inaugurated in Maitencillo, benefiting nearly 2,500 people.
