= Academia Chilena de la Historia =

The Chilean Academy of History is a Chilean institution dedicated to fostering interest in historical studies through publications, conferences, and competitions.

== History ==
The institution traces its roots to the Chilean Society of History and Geography. In 1897, Enrique Matta Vial, the then undersecretary of public instruction, secured a decree for the establishment of the National Academy of History. Despite the initial efforts, the project was not realized due to a lack of interest. Nevertheless, the proposed statutes for the National Academy of History served as the foundation for the regulatory framework of the Chilean Society of History and Geography, which adhered to these statutes until 1958.

The founding of the society in 1911 initially involved a proposal to establish it as an academy rather than a society. This proposal was not accepted, and the organization was established as a society. Despite the initial decision, the concept of forming an academy persisted and nearly came to fruition around 1930, largely due to the keen interest of several members, notably Jaime Eyzaguirre.

The Royal Spanish Academy extended an offer to the society, which was subsequently declined. As a result of this decision, Jaime Eyzaguirre and several other members chose to withdraw from the society.

The inaugural session of the Chilean Academy of History occurred on January 4, 1933, under the sponsorship of the Catholic University. The first board of directors was elected, comprising Miguel Varas Velasquez, Juan Luis Espejo, and Jaime Eyzaguirre, with Agustín Edwards Mac-Clure serving as president. Despite efforts, Edwards Mac-Clure was unsuccessful in uniting the disparate associations.

Of the 36 founding members of the Chilean Academy of History, 26 were also members of the Chilean Society of History and Geography, indicating that the Academy can be considered an offshoot of the latter society.

Since 1964, the Chilean Academy of History has been affiliated with the Instituto de Chile, an organization that encompasses all the Chilean academies.

The primary publication of the Chilean Academy of History is the Boletín de la Academia Chilena de la Historia. The first issue was published in 1933, and the journal continues to be published to this day.
