= Juan Gómez Millas =

Chilean politician and educator (1900–1987)

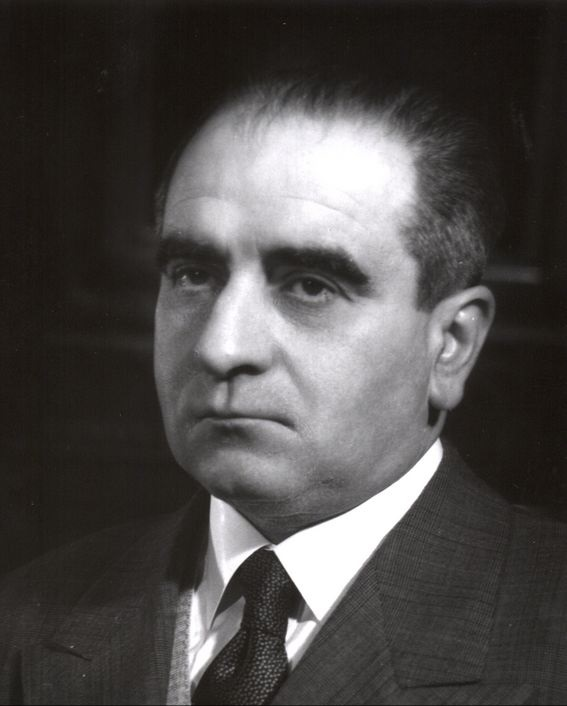

Minister of Education
- In office 3 November 1964 – 4 March 1968
- President: Eduardo Frei Montalva
- Preceded by: Alejandro Garretón
- Succeeded by: Máximo Pacheco Gómez

Personal details
- Born: 18 July 1900 Santiago, Chile
- Died: 16 March 1987 (aged 86) Maitencillo, Chile
- Education: University of Chile
- Profession: Historian

Juan Gómez Millas (Spanish pronunciation: [xwaŋ ˈɡomes ˈmiʝas]; July 18, 1900 – March 16, 1987) was a Chilean politician and educator.

In 1925, he was accepted as a professor of universal history from the Pedagogical Institute. Years later, he became director of the Institute of History and Geography at the same university, where he devoted himself to promoting ideas for change in education in Chile. In 1931, he was appointed general secretary of the organization. During his administration, he created the Editorial Universitaria and Welfare Department. He would later be elected Dean of the Faculty of Education.

Gómez Millas was founder of the far-right political party Partido Unión Nacionalista de Chile, which existed from 1943 until 1945. Gómez Millas aligned the party with Nazism and Fascist Italy. The party dissolved after the end of WWII.

In 1952, he was appointed Minister of Education by President Ibáñez, a position he was a year before he was elected rector of the University of Chile. During his presidency, which lasted until 1963, the university opened its regional headquarters.
