= Pontifical Catholic University of Valparaíso =

University in Chile

- Pontificia Universidad Católica de Valparaíso (Spanish)
- Pontifical Catholic University of Valparaíso coat of arms
- Other names: PUCV; UCV
- Former names: Catholic University of Valparaíso
- Motto: Fides et labor (Latin)
- Motto in English: "Faith and work"
- Type: Private, Traditional
- Established: 15 March 1928 (98)
- Religious affiliation: Catholic Church
- Budget: CLP$ 61,879,000,000 (year 2013)
- Chancellor: Mgr. Gonzalo Duarte García de Cortázar SS.CC.
- Vice-Chancellor: Pbr. Dietrich Lorenz Daiber
- Rector: Nelson Vásquez Lara
- Secretary-General: Juan Carlos Gentina Morales
- Academic staff: 1,501(of these about 650 are full time faculty)
- Administrative staff: 1,266
- Students: 18,327
- Undergraduates: 16,798
- Postgraduates: 1,078
- Doctoral students: 451
- Other students: 314 (International student exchange)
- Location: Valparaíso, Region of Valparaíso, Chile; 33°2′41″S 71°36′20″W
- Campus: Urban 255 089 m² of land 143 817 m² built
- Language: Spanish
- Colors: Dark blue Dark red Golden
- Website: pucv.cl
- Data Source: Cuenta Anual "CLAUSTRO PLENO ORDINARIO 2023"

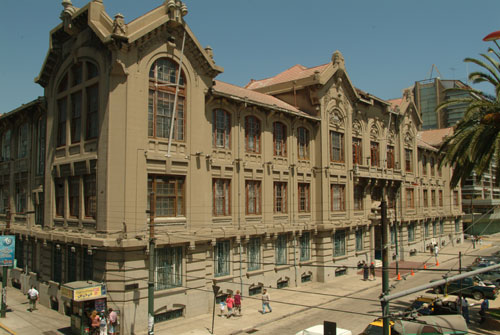
Casa Central, the primary building of PUCV

The Open City of Ritoque, teaching and research ground of the PUCV Architecture School.

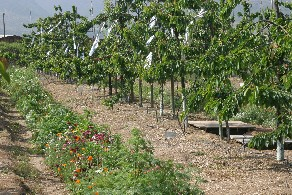
Sweet cherry orchard at the PUCV Experiment Station in Quillota. This picture shows a view of the orchard floor including a floral biodiversity strip and the access door to a rhizotron.

The Pontifical Catholic University of Valparaíso (Spanish: Pontificia Universidad Católica de Valparaíso) (PUCV), also known as Universidad Católica de Valparaíso (UCV), is one of six Catholic universities in Chile and one of the two pontifical universities in the country, along with the Pontifical Catholic University of Chile. Founded in 1928, it is located in Valparaíso Region and has about 18,000 students.

It is recognized in Chile as an institution with high academic prestige and as a research university due to its acquired research funds and offered postgraduate degrees in the fields of science, engineering, humanities and arts. As a Catholic university, it answers directly to the Holy See and the Bishopric of Valparaíso. The PUCV is a traditional university and one of the twenty-five institutions within the Chilean Rectors' Council (Consejo de Rectores). Although it is not state-owned, a substantial part of its budget is given by state transfers under different programs.

PUCV is an urban university. It has a central campus known as Casa Central (Central House) located in downtown Valparaíso, only a few blocks away from the Chilean Congress, the Metro, and the Pacific Ocean. One of the drawbacks of being an urban university is the difficulty of growing at the original site of its foundation, close to the city center. Hence, while some PUCV buildings are on the historic palm-tree-lined Avenida Brasil, several of its schools are dispersed throughout Valparaíso, Viña del Mar, Quilpué and Quillota.

At the 2019 edition of the América Economía magazine university ranking, the university was positioned 4th nationwide and the QS Latin America University Ranking of 2023 has placed it 22nd out of 428 qualifying institutions (and 5th nationwide). The university is accredited for seven years, the maximum number of years awarded by the National Accreditation Commission, for the period between 2021 and 2028. The PUCV, the University of Chile, the Catholic University, the University of Santiago and the University of Concepción are the only institutions in Chile that have received the highest number of years in accreditation.

PUCV attracts students from different regions of Chile, as well as hundreds of exchange students from Europe, North America and several countries from South America, due to its student exchange programs.

== Profile ==
The PUCV offers undergraduate degrees subjects including architecture, design, horticulture, industrial engineering, business, law, accounting and finance and Spanish.

The school of architecture, also called "The Valparaíso School", constructed an experimental city called the Open City, a few kilometers North of Valparaíso, where the professors teach and live in the houses that they and the students design and build. Similarly, in the Quillota campus the program in horticulture is offered within an experimental station. This campus is visited by more than 1,500 people each year, and has collections of subtropical and temperate fruit trees, and a nursery. The station of 500,000 square metres has more than 50,000 square metres of greenhouses.

The diversity of the PUCV is one of its strengths, with a rainbow trout farm near Los Andes, a legislative consultancy group (CEAL), a farm in Quillota with an area of 6 km^{2}, a fruit packing house specialized in avocados and citrus fruits (joint venture with Exportadora Santa Cruz), a TV station, that has been on the air since 1957 (the first in the country), a radio station, a publishing house, and an experimental grade school and high school for boys in Viña del Mar. All of these units welcome interns and scholars, both from PUCV and other universities.

The PUCV houses the editorial offices of journals in marine biology, law, religion, philosophy, psychology, and biotechnology. Explora, a special government program to promote science in primary and secondary schools, is also hosted by the PUCV.

== History ==
It was founded in March 1928, supported by the generous contribution of Isabel Caces de Brown. Even older, the Law School was established in 1894 as an independent college by the Sacred Heart Fathers, and was later incorporated into the university (since both were units of the Roman Catholic Church). The first undergraduate majors offered by the PUCV were electrical engineering, construction, chemistry, mining, business administration, mechanical engineering, decorative arts, and merchant marine studies.

The Pontifical title was conferred by Pope John Paul II and announced at the inauguration of the 2003 academic year by Zenon Grocholewski, Cardinal Prefect of the Congregation for Catholic Education.

University rankings

Global – Overall
- QS World: 791-800 (2026)

== Administration ==
PUCV is a private institution dependent upon the Roman Catholic Church. As some other old private universities in Chile, PUCV receives some funding from the Chilean government. PUCV's Grand Chancellor is the Bishop of Valparaíso, who appoints representatives in the Academic Council but does not directly run the university (responsibility of a faculty-elected Rector). The Council includes the Deans of each faculty, all of whom are elected by the faculty.

The appointment of PUCV officers and structural changes in its administration need the approval of the Holy See, with periodic reviews by the Congregation for Catholic Education of the Roman Curia. Doctoral honoris causa degrees need to be approved by the Congregation.

== Faculties and undergraduate programs ==
Currently, PUCV has 62 undergraduate programs, 19 doctorate programs, 39 master programs and 82 other postgraduate programs.

- Faculty of Architecture and Urbanism
  - Art, Architecture, Graphic Design, Industrial Design
- Faculty of Agriculture
  - Fruit Science, Vegetable Crops and Ornamentals, Environmental Management, Food Technology
- Faculty of Science
  - Mathematics, Statistics, Biology, Physics, Chemistry
- Faculty of Economic and Management Sciences
  - Management, Accounting Auditing, Social Work, Journalism
- Faculty of Engineering
  - Biochemical Engineering, Chemical Engineering, Civil Engineering, Computing Engineering, Construction Engineering, Electrical and Electronic Engineering, Industrial Engineering, Mechanical Engineering, Transportation Engineering
- Faculty of Law ― Central Campus
  - Law
- Faculty of Natural Resources
  - Geography, Oceanography, Aquaculture and Fisheries
- Faculty of Philosophy and Education
  - Philosophy, Psychology, Education, Special Education, Physical Education, History, Spanish and English, Music
- Ecclesiastical Faculty of Theology – Institute of Religious Studies
  - Religious Studies

== International relations ==
PUCV has a long history of academic relations with institutions all over the world, with more than 260 agreements concentrated in European universities. Student exchange is most active with universities of Spain, US, France, Germany; a few students are from countries in Latin America. The list of institutions includes some of the oldest universities in the world, such as Université catholique de Louvain (founded in 1425 by Pope Martin V), Università di Pisa (founded in 1343 by Pope Clement VI) and Ruprecht Karl University of Heidelberg.

== Notable alumni ==
- Bishop Carlos Camus, a human rights leader during Augusto Pinochet's dictatorship.
- Jorge Sharp Fajardo, lawyer and current mayor of Valparaíso.
- Ricardo Ezzati Andrello, Archbishop of Santiago.
- Juan Carlos García Pérez de Arce, Architect and politician, Minister of Public Works in Gabriel Boric's government.
- Alejandro Foxley, economist and politician, Foreign Affairs Minister in Michelle Bachelet's government.
- Jorge Martínez Busch, former commander-in-chief of the Chilean Navy, as well as an appointed senator in the Senate of Chile from 1998 to March 2006, when a reform of the Constitution of Chile put an end to non-democratic senators.
