= Jannacci =

Jannacci is an Italian surname. Notable people with the surname include:

- Enzo Jannacci (1935 – 2013), Italian singer-songwriter, pianist, actor and comedian
- Paolo Jannacci (born 1972), Italian singer, pianist and composer

== See also ==
- Giannini
