= Giannini (surname) =

Giannini is a surname of Italian origin. The name refers to:

- Adriano Giannini (born 1971), Italian actor and voice actor, son of Giancarlo
- Agnes Giannini (died 1977), American politician
- Amadeo Giannini (1870–1949), Italian-American banker; founder of Bank of America
- Brett Giannini, American politician
- Dusolina Giannini (1902–1986), Italian-American opera soprano
- Eli Giannini (born 1956) Australian architect
- Ettore Giannini (1912–1990), Italian screenwriter and film director
- Ferruccio Giannini (1868–1948), Italian naturalized American tenor, and a pioneer of opera recording
- Frida Giannini (born 1972), Italian fashion designer
- Giancarlo Giannini (born 1942), Italian actor and voice actor, father of Adriano
- Giuseppe Giannini (born 1964), Italian professional football player
- Gustavo Giannini (born 1968), Argentine filmmaker
- Humberto Giannini (1927–2014), Chilean philosopher
- Joe Giannini (1888–1942), American professional baseball player
- John Giannini (born 1962), American college basketball coach
- Jorge Giannini (born 1948), Argentine retired field hockey player
- Luca Giannini (born 2004), Welsh rugby union player
- Margaret Giannini (1921–2021), American physician, government official
- Osvaldo Giannini (1934−1999), Chilean lawyer and politician
- Stefania Giannini (born 1960), current Italian Minister of Education, Universities and Research
- Tula Giannini, American academic and musicologist
- Vittorio Giannini (1903–1966), American composer

Others

- Elena Gianini Belotti (1929–2022), Italian writer
- Juan Pablo Gianini (born 1978), Argentine racing driver

== See also ==
- Giannini (disambiguation)
