= María Manzano =

Spanish mathematician (born 1950)

- María Gracia Manzano Arjona
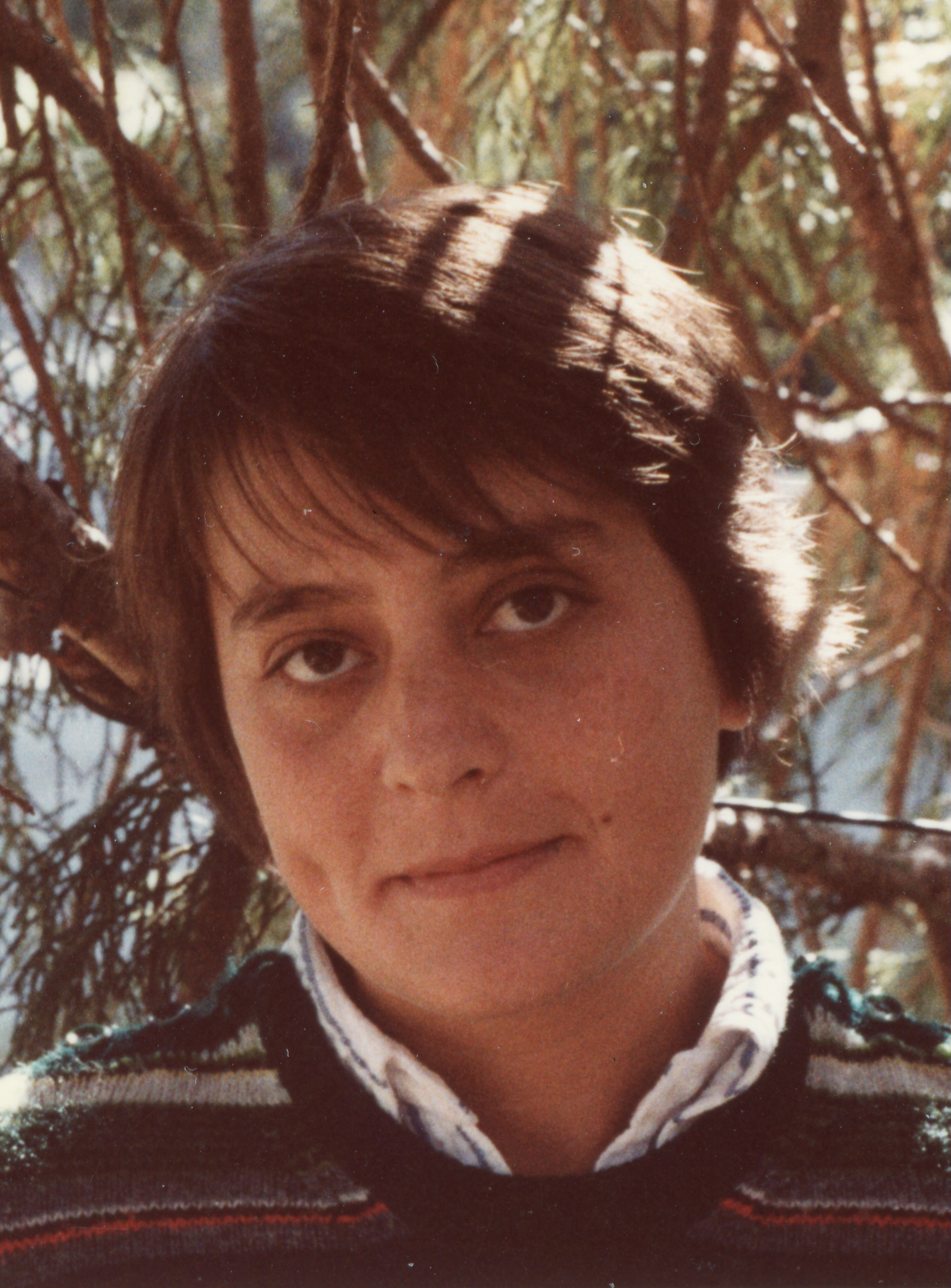
- Manzano in 1977
- Born: 1950 (age 75–76); Archidona
- Education: University of Barcelona
- Scientific career
- Fields: mathematical logic
- Workplaces: University of Salamanca.
- Thesis: Sistemas generales de la lógica de segundo orden (1978)
- Doctoral advisor: Jesús Mosterín
- Doctoral students: Alfonso Cabanzo Vargas; Cuitláhuac Rodríguez Campos; José Javier González López; Julián Mauricio Valdés Toro
- Website: Official website

María Gracia Manzano Arjona (born 1950) is a Spanish philosopher specializing in mathematical logic and model theory.

Manzano earned her Ph.D. in 1977 from the University of Barcelona. Her dissertation, Sistemas generales de la lógica de segundo orden [General systems of second-order logic], was supervised by Jesús Mosterín. She is a professor of logic and the philosophy of science at the University of Salamanca.

She is the author of several books on logic and model theory:

- Manzano, María (1989), Teoría de modelos (in Spanish), Alianza Editorial, ISBN 9788420681269

Model Theory, Oxford Logic Guides, vol. 37, translated by De Queiroz, Ruy, Oxford University Press, 1999 [1989], ISBN 978-0198538516

- Manzano, María (1996), Extensions of First Order Logic, Cambridge Tracts in Theoretical Computer Science, vol. 19, Cambridge University Press, ISBN 0521354358
- Manzano, María; Huertas, Antonia (2004), Lógica para principiantes (in Spanish), Alianza Editorial
