= National Prize for Humanities and Social Sciences (Chile) =

- To the humanist, scientist, or academic, who has distinguished himself for his contribution in the field of Human Sciences
- Country: Chile
- First award: 1992

The National Prize for Humanities and Social Sciences (Spanish: Premio Nacional de Humanidades y Ciencias Sociales) was created in Chile in 1992 under Law 19169. It is granted "to the humanist, scientist, or academic, who has distinguished himself for his contribution in the field of Human Sciences" (Article 8 of the aforementioned law). The history field has its own National Award.

The prize, which is awarded every two years, consists of a diploma, the sum of 6,576,457 pesos (US$8,665) which is adjusted every year, according to the previous year's consumer price index, and a pension of 20 monthly tax units (approximately US$1,600).

It is part of the National Prize of Chile, awarded by the President of the Republic.

== Winners ==
- 1993, Félix Schwartzmann (philosophy)
- 1995, Aníbal Pinto Santa Cruz (economics)
- 1997, Juan de Dios Vial Larraín (law and philosophy)
- 1999, Humberto Giannini (philosophy)
- 2001, Francisco Orrego Vicuña (law)
- 2003, José Zalaquett (law)
- 2005, Ricardo Ffrench-Davis (economics)
- 2007, Manuel Antonio Garretón (sociology)
- 2009, Agustín Squella (law and journalism)
- 2011, Carla Cordua and Roberto Torretti (philosophy)
- 2013, Sonia Montecino (anthropology)
- 2015, Tomás Moulian (sociology)
- 2017, Elizabeth Lira (psychology)

== See also ==
- List of social sciences awards
- List of psychology awards
