= Jorge Millas Award =

Chilean award

- Awarded for: Academic merit
- Sponsored by: Austral University of Chile
- Country: Chile
- First award: 1996
- Website: humanidades.uach.cl/claves/premio-jorge-millas/

The Jorge Millas Award (Spanish: Premio Jorge Millas) was instituted in 1996 to remember the work of the distinguished intellectual Jorge Millas (1917–1982), an academic at the University of Chile and dean of the Faculty of Philosophy and Social Sciences of the Austral University of Chile.

The recognition consists of an economic stimulus, a commemorative medal with the effigy of the philosopher, and an official diploma.

It is given by the Austral University of Chile on a biennial basis.

For the 2010 edition, the jury was made up of the 2008 winner, the former rector of the University of Chile, Jaime Lavados, the former rector of the Pontifical Catholic University of Valparaíso, Alfonso Muga, and the rector of the Austral University, Víctor Cubillos. They resolved unanimously to present the award to Juan de Dios Vial Correa.

== Awardees ==
- 1996: Humberto Giannini
- 1998: Agustín Squella
- 2000: Fernando Oyarzun Peña
- 2002: Italo Caorsi Chouquer
- 2004: Luis Eduardo González Fiegehen
- 2006: Carla Cordua
- 2008: Jaime Lavados
- 2010: Juan de Dios Vial Correa
- 2012: Humberto Giannini
- 2014: Pablo Oyarzún
- 2016: Francisco Javier Gil
