= Carla Cordua =

Chilean philosopher

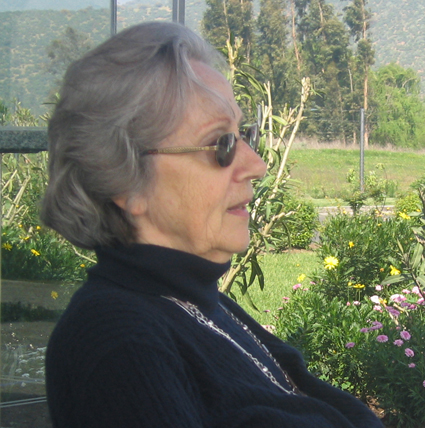
- in 2004
- Born: 25 December 1925 (age 99); Los Ángeles, Chile
- Education: University of Chile
- Awards: Jorge Millas Award (2006); National Prize for Humanities and Social Sciences (2011)

Carla Cordua (born 25 December 1925) is a Chilean philosopher.

== Life ==
Cordua was born in Los Ángeles, Chile on Christmas Day, 1925. She entered the University of Chile in 1948 and studied under Bogumil Jasinowski and Oscar Marín.

In 2006 she received the Jorge Millas Award for academic merit from the Austral University of Chile.

She was married to Roberto Torretti who was also a philosopher. During the period of military dictatorship the two left Chile. In 2011 they were jointly awarded Chile's National Prize for Humanities and Social Sciences.
