= Scarlett O'Phelan Godoy =

Peruvian historian and university professor

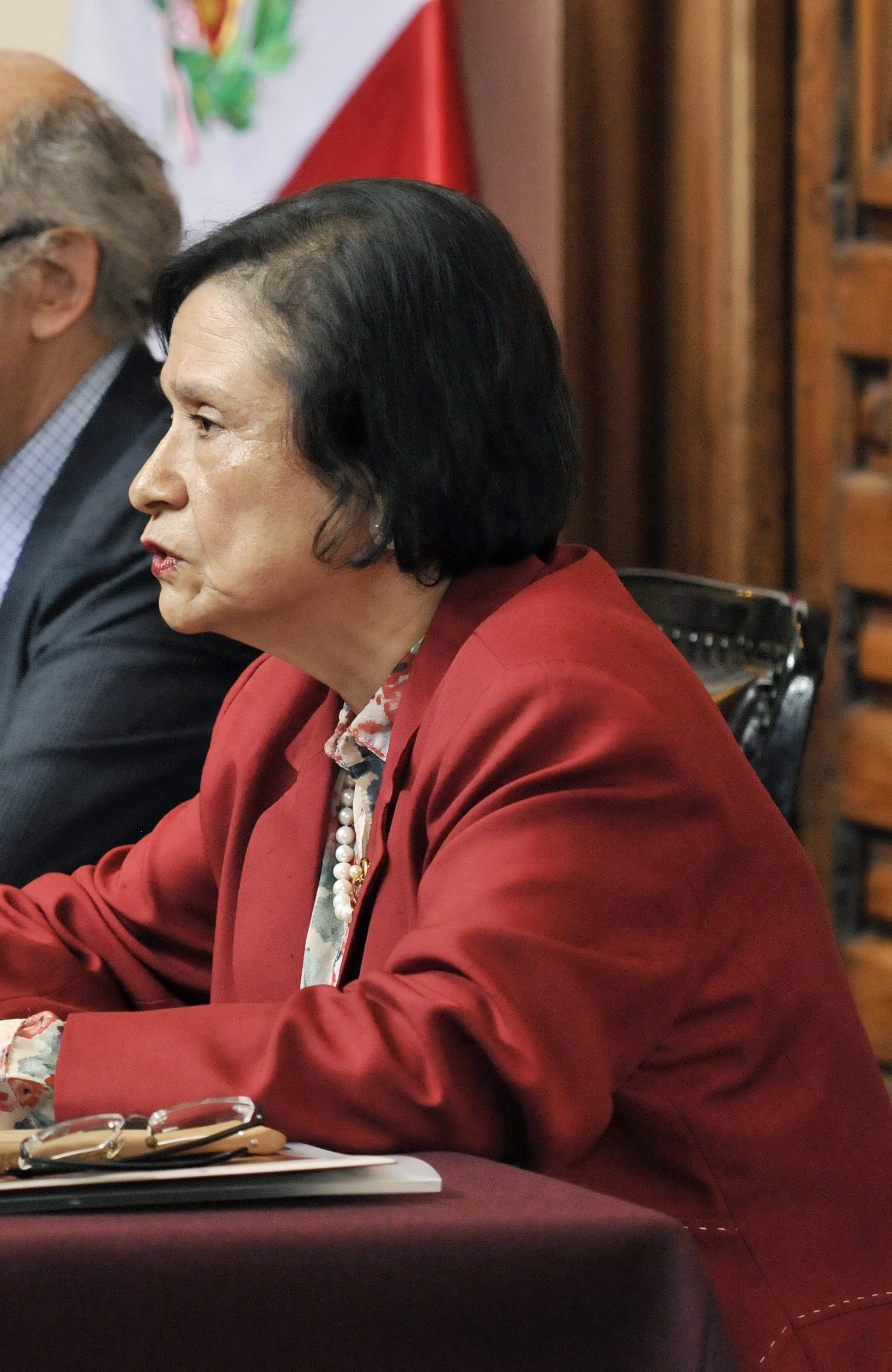
- Born: 1951; Lima
- Occupation: University teacher
- Awards: Guggenheim Fellowship (history of the Iberian Peninsula, history of Latin America, 1988)
- Scientific career
- Fields: History

Scarlett Rebeca O'Phelan Godoy (Lima, April 27, 1951) is a Peruvian historian and university professor. Her research focuses on the Peruvian emancipation process, which begins in the 18th century and goes up to the first 35 years of the 19th century. As a professor, she covers the 19th century, as well as the 20th century up to the period of Fujimori's government. She deals with Chinese, Japanese, Jewish, Arab, German, and Italian immigration, as well as other topics. In 2008–09, she held the Simón Bolívar Chair in Latin American Studies.

== Early life and education ==
Scarlett O'Phelan was born in Lima on April 27, 1951 to Rafael O'Phelan and Rebeca Godoy. She is descended from Irish immigrants who moved from Waterford to Peru in the late 1700s. She attended school at Colegio María Alvarado (Lima High School). She completed her higher education at the Pontifical Catholic University of Peru (PUCP), where she graduated with a bachelor's degree in humanities with a major in history with the thesis, El carácter de las revueltas campesinas del siglo XVIII en el norte del Virreinato del Perú (1976). She taught at PUCP as head of internships (1973-1976). In 1977, she earned a bachelor's degree at PUCP in History).

She pursued doctoral studies at Birkbeck, University of London (1982) and post-doctoral studies at the University of Cologne, Germany (1983-1985) and at the Spanish National Research Council, Escuela de Estudios Hispano-Americanos (1991-1993). Her doctorate (Ph.D.) was obtained with her thesis, Rebellions and Revolts in Eighteenth Century Peru and Upper Peru (1982), published six years later in Spanish as Un siglo de rebeliones anticoloniales. Peru and Bolivia 1700-1783 (1988).

== Career ==
After a period of work as a researcher for various institutes in Peru and other countries, she returned to teaching at PUCP as a contract professor of history (1985-1988). She then became a regular professor of the Master's program in History at the PUCP Graduate School (1988-1997).

She has also been an associate professor at the University of Virginia; professor in the Master's program in History at the Universidad Iberoamericana de Andalucía; visiting professor at the University of Chicago, the University of Liverpool, the University of Texas at Austin, Duke University in North Carolina, and the School for Advanced Studies in the Social Sciences in Paris, as well as professor at the Academia Diplomática del Perú Javier Pérez de Cuéllar. She is currently a professor in history in the Department of Humanities at PUCP.

She has been awarded several fellowships, including: Ford Foundation doctoral fellowship (1977-1979), Central Research Fund of the University of London (1978, 1980), Latin American Research Fellowship (London, 1980–1981), British Academy Award in Humanities (1981-1982), Alexander von Humboldt Stiftung (1983-1985), Social Science Research Council (New York, 1985–1986), John Simon Guggenheim Fellowship (1989-1990), and Maison des Sciences de L'Homme Research Fellowship (Paris, 1991).

O'Phelan is a full member of the National Academy of History (Peru); member of the Association of Latin American Historians, AHILA (1982). She served as editorial advisor of the German Jahrbuch für Geschichte (1983-1984).

She has written several books as well as numerous articles for specialized magazines.

== Selected works ==
=== Books ===
- El carácter de las revueltas campesinas del siglo XVIII en el norte del Virreinato peruano (1978)
- Rebellions and Revolts in Eighteenth Century Peru and Upper Peru (Colonia, 1985), traducido al castellano como Un siglo de rebeliones anticoloniales. Perú y Bolivia 1700-1783 (Cuzco, 1988; Lima, 2012)
- La gran rebelión de los Andes: de Túpac Amaru a Túpac Catari (Cuzco, 1995)
- Kurakas sin sucesiones. Del cacique al alcalde de indios (Cuzco, 1997)
- El norte en la historia regional (Lima, 1998), compiladora junto a Yves Saint-Geours
- El Perú en el siglo XVIII. La era borbónica (Lima, 1999; 2015), compiladora.
- La Independencia del Peru. De los Borbones a Bolívar (Lima, 2001), compiladora.
- Historia de la familia en el Virreinato del Perú (Lima, 2001).
- Bernardo O'Higgins y su estancia en el Perú (Lima, 2010).
- Perú. Crisis imperial e independencia (Lima, 2013).
- Mestizos Reales en el virreinato del Perú: Indios nobles, caciques y capitanes de mita (Lima, 2013).
- Abascal y la contraindependencia de América del Sur (Lima, 2013). Ed. con G. Lomné.
- Voces americanas en las Cortes de Cádiz: 1810-1814 (Lima, 2014). Ed. con G. Lomné.
- La Independencia en los Andes. Una historia conectada (Lima, 2014).
- Siete Ensayos sobre la Gran Rebelión de los Andes: de Túpac Amaru a Túpac Catari (Lima, 2016).
