= Giannini =

Giannini may refer to:

- Giannini (surname), Italian surname
- Giannini Automobili, Italian tuning company and a former producer of cars
- Giannini (guitar company), Brazilian musical instruments manufacturing company
- Giannini Hall, historic building in Berkeley, California
- The Giannini Foundation of Agricultural Economics
- Giannini sextuplets, set of sextuplets born to Rosanna Caviglia Giannini and Franco Giannini at Careggi, Florence, Italy
- Giannini Controls Corporation, an American aerospace and industrial control company

== See also ==
- Gianni
