= Ricardo Ffrench-Davis =

Chilean economist (born 1936)

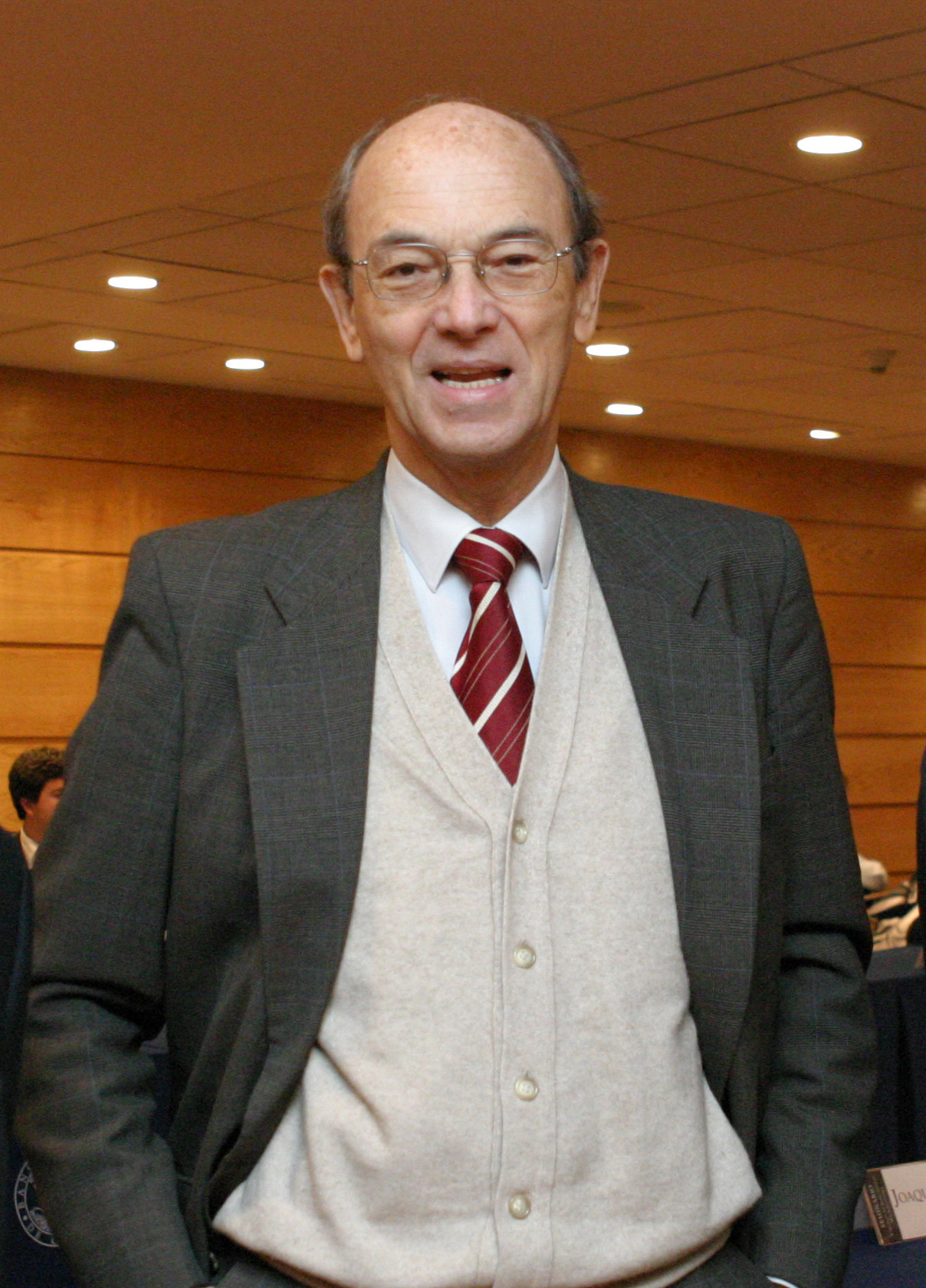
- Born: 27 June 1936 (age 90)
- Political party: Christian Democratic Party (1958−present)

Academic background
- Education: Pontifical Catholic University of Chile

Academic work
- Discipline: Macroeconomics
- School or tradition: Chicago school of economics
- Institutions: Pontifical Catholic University of Chile, Corporación de Estudios para Latinoamérica, Central Bank of Chile, United Nations Economic Commission for Latin America and the Caribbean
- Notable ideas: Applied macroeconomics
- Awards: National Prize for Humanities and Social Sciences (2005)
- Website: Information at IDEAS / RePEc

Ricardo Ffrench-Davis (born 27 June 1936) is a Chilean economist. He is Professor of the Department of Economics and the Instituto de Estudios Internacionales at the University of Chile. Along with a few other Chilean students, Ffrench-Davis got the chance to study at the University of Chicago in the 1960s. He earned his Ph.D. in Economics from the University of Chicago in 1971. Although the students were later named Chicago Boys, Professor Ffrench-Davis was a critic of the neo-liberal policies implemented in Chile by the Pinochet dictatorship.

From 1964 to 1970, Ffrench-Davis was Deputy Manager of the Central Bank of Chile. He was Co-founder of the think tank Center for Economic Research on Latin America (CIEPLAN) where he acted as Vice-President from 1976 to 1990. Between 1990 and 1992, he was Director of Research and Chief Economist, of the Central Bank of Chile, when Chile designed the successful countercyclical regulation of the external accounts. From 1992 to 2004 he became Principal Regional Adviser at the United Nations Economic Commission for Latin America and the Caribbean (CEPAL/ECLAC)

Ffrench-Davis was awarded the National Prize for Humanities and Social Sciences from the State of Chile in 2005. He was Chairperson of the Committee for Development Policy of the United Nations in 2007–2010; in 2004–2010 he represented Presidents Ricardo Lagos and Michelle Bachelet in the International Initiative to Fight Hunger and Poverty, launched by Brazil, Chile, France and Spain.
