= Manuel Antonio Garretón =

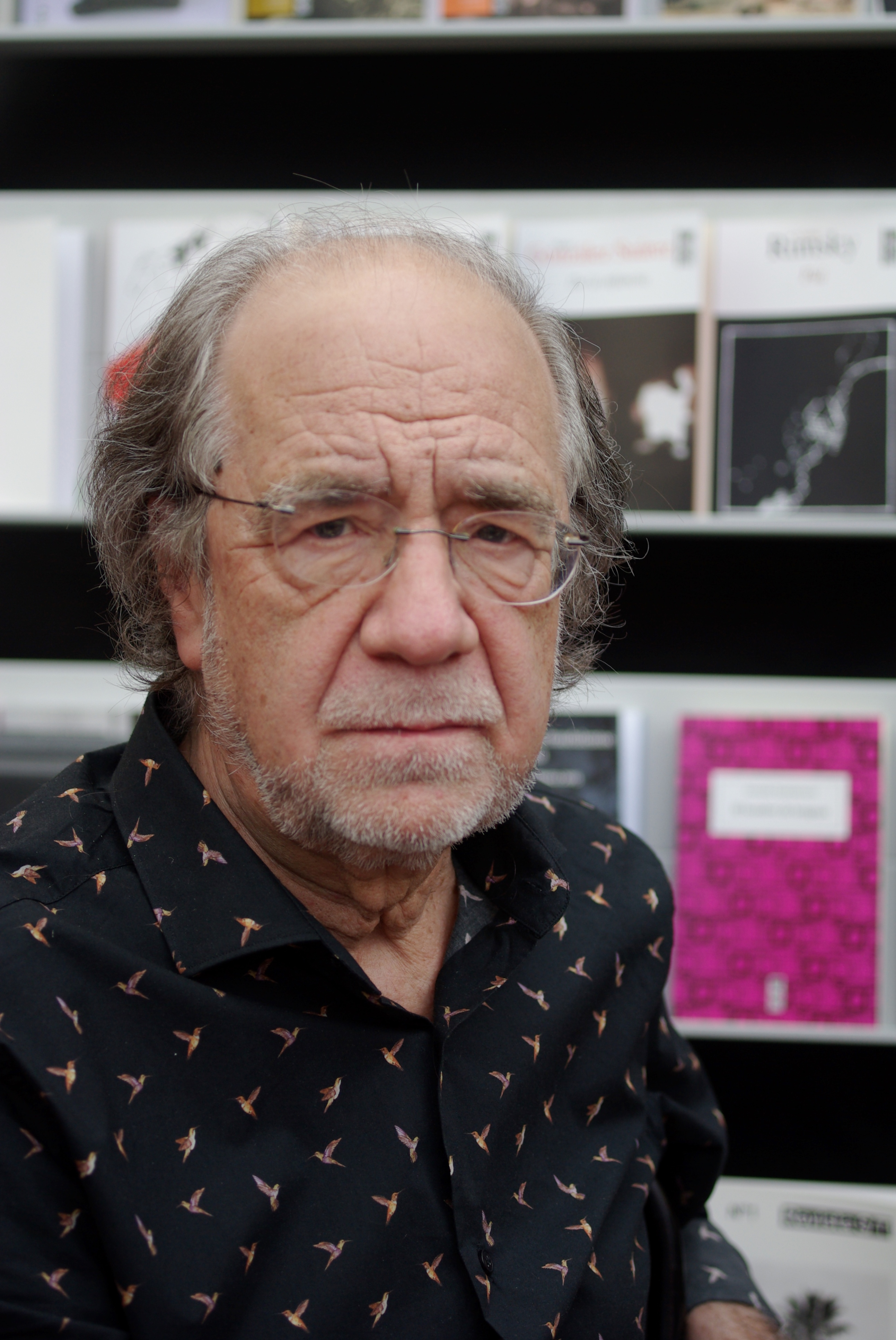
Garretón in 2016

Manuel Antonio Garretón (Santiago, May 23, 1943) is a Chilean sociologist, political scientist and essayist. He received the National Prize for Humanities and Social Sciences in 2007 for his lifetime contribution to the field.

== Scholarly and academic career ==
Garretón studied Sociology in the Catholic University of Chile and graduated in 1967. He received his PhD at the École des Hautes Études en Sciences Sociales of Paris. He directed the Catholic University of Chile's Centro de Estudios de la Realidad Nacional (CEREN) from 1970 until its closing in 1973. He also edited CEREN's journal Cuadernos de la Realidad Nacional during those same years. In 1973, he was the Dean of the Area of Interdisciplinary Social Studies at the Catholic University. After the 1973 military coup, Garretón coordinated emergency groups in the social sciences in Chile. Between 1975 and 1995 he was at the Facultad de Ciencias Sociales (FACSO), Chile, as Research Professor. Since 1994 Garretón has been full professor at the Department of Sociology, School of Social Sciences, at the University of Chile.

Garretón has served as visiting professor at European, North, and South American universities, and as Director and Dean of numerous academic institutions. He was awarded the Guggenheim Fellowship in 1983, and chosen as the Simón Bolívar Professor of Latin-American Studies at the University of Cambridge, UK, for 2012-13. He has acted as advisor and consultant to government and private institutions within Chile and internationally. He has also served on the board of several academic journals and has been a jury member for the award of research scholarships and fellowships.

Garretón research and teaching has concentrated on political sociology, democratization, state and society, authoritarian regimes, social actors and social movements, political parties, university and higher education, public opinion and social demands, culture and education, development of the social sciences, political and sociological theory, reform of the state and public policies, and modernization and society in Latin America.

In 2015, the Latin American Studies Association bestowed the Kalman H. Silvert award upon Garretón for his lifetime contribution to the study of Latin America.

== Political life ==
Garretón entered political life as a student, and served as President of the Student Federation of the Catholic University of Chile in 1963–64. As a professor, he represented the faculty in the Superior Council of the Catholic University of Chile between 1970 and 1972.
Garretón was among the founders of the Grupo por la Renovación Socialista, and was one of its leaders in 1979–1985. Garretón was an executive of the Socialist Bloc between 1983 and 1985, was elected to the Socialist Party's Central Committee from 1985 to 1995, was a member of the Technical Committee for the Concertación de Partidos por el NO, and of the Concertación de Partidos por la Democracia for the plebiscite of 1988. In 1993, Garretón headed the Education Program of the electoral campaign of President Eduardo Frei.
Through publications, columns, interviews, in different fora and the mass media, Garretón intervenes actively in the political, intellectual and cultural debates of Chile and Latin America: in the opposition to military dictatorships, in the democratic transition and the new democratic era, in the processes of Socialist renewal, in the debates on the quality of politics, in the debate around constituent processes and the new Constitution.

== Books published ==
- Integración nacional y marginalidad (Ensayo de regionalización social de Chile) (with Armand Mattelart), 1969
- Problemas y perspectivas del Socialismo en Chile (coordinator), 1971
- Revolución y legalidad : problemas del Estado y el Derecho en Chile (co-editor with Norbert Lechner), 1972
- Sobre la justicia en Chile (co-editor with Norbert Lechner), 1973
- Ideología y medios de comunicación (editor), 1974
- Economía política en la Unidad Popular (co-editor with Rodrigo Atria), 1975
- Cultura y comunicación de masas. Materiales de la discusión chilena 1970‑1973 (co-editor with Hernán Valdés), 1975.
- Análisis coyuntural y proceso político. Las fases del conflicto en Chile 1970‑1973 (with Tomás Moulián), 1978
- Las ciencias sociales en Chile. Situación, problemas y perspectivas, 1983
- El Proceso político chileno, 1983. In English: The Chilean Political Process, 1989
- La Unidad Popular y el conflicto político en Chile (with Tomás Moulián), 1983. Second enhanced edition, 1993
- Dictaduras y democratización, 1984
- Escenarios e itinerarios para la transición, 1985
- Reconstruir la política. Transición y consolidación democrática en Chile, 1987
- Biblioteca del Movimiento Estudiantil (5 vols) (coordinator with Javier Martínez), 1986
- Muerte y Resurrección. Los partidos políticos en el autoritarismo y las transiciones del Cono Sur (co-editor with Marcelo Cavarozzi), 1989
- Propuestas Políticas y Demandas Sociales (3 vols) (coordinator), 1989
- Militares y Política en una transición atípica (co-editor with Domingo Rivarola and M. Cavarozzi), 1991
- Fear at the edge. State terror and resistance in Latin America (co-editor with Patricia Weiss Fagen and Juan E. Corradi), 1992
- Los partidos políticos en el inicio de los noventa. Seis casos latinoamericanos (coordinator), 1992
- Los chilenos y la democracia. La opinión pública 1991-1994 (with Marta Lagos and Roberto Méndez)(4 vols), 1993, 1995
- Los partidos y la transformación política de América Latina (editor), 1993
- Modernización, democracia y descentralización. Materiales del IV Congreso Chileno de Sociología (co-editor with Malva Espinosa, Cecilia Jara, Eduardo Morales, Sergio Contreras), 1993
- Cultura, autoritarismo y redemocratización en Chile (co-editor with Saúl Sosnowski and Bernardo Subercaseaux), 1993
- La faz sumergida del iceberg: ensayos sobre la transformación cultural, 1994
- Hacia una nueva era política. Estudio sobre las democratizaciones, 1995
- Dimensiones actuales de la Sociología (co-editor with Orlando Mella), 1995
- Social Movements in Latin America in the context of economic and socio-political transformation (editor), 1996
- La encrucijada de lo político (co-editor with R. Lanz), 1996
- Las transformaciones en América Latina y las perspectivas de la integración (co-editor with J. Lira and A. Ajens), 1997
- Por la fuerza sin la razón. Análisis y Textos de los Bandos de la Dictadura Militar (with Roberto and Carmen Garretón), 1998
- América Latina: un espacio cultural en el mundo globalizado (coordinator), 1999
- Política y sociedad entre dos épocas. América Latina en el cambio de siglo, 2000
- La sociedad en que vivi(re)mos. Introducción sociológica al cambio de siglo, 2000, 2a ed. 2015
- Cultura y Desarrollo en Chile. Dimensiones y perspectivas en el cambio de siglo (coordinator), 2001
- Democracy in Latin America. (Re)Constructing political Society (co-editor with E. Newman) 2001
- Latin America in the 21st century. Toward a new socio-political matrix (with M. Cavarozzi, P. Cleaves, G. Gereffi, J. Hartlyn), 2003. In Spanish: América Latina en el siglo XXI. Hacia una nueva matriz socio-política, 2004. In Portuguese: America Latina no seculo XXI, 2007
- El espacio cultural latinoamericano. Bases para una política de integración cultural (coordinator) (with Jesús Martín Barbero, Marcelo Cavarozzi, Néstor García Canclini, Guadalupe Ruiz-Jimenez and Rodolfo Stavenhagen), 2003
- Democracia en las Américas: desafíos, peligros, expectativas (co-organizador), 2003
- The incomplete democracy. Studies on politics and society in Latin America and Chile, 2003
- Encuentros con la memoria. Archivos y debates de memoria y futuro (co-editor with Faride Zerán, Sergio Campos, and Carmen Garretón), 2004
- Las Ciencias Sociales en América Latina en perspectiva comparada (with Helgio Trindade, org, Jerónimo De Sierra, Miguel Murmis, José Luis Reyna) Siglo XXI, 2007. In Portuguese: As Ciencias Sociais na America Latina em perspectiva comparada, 2006. English version: Social Sciences in Latin America (1930-2003), 2005
- Del post-pinochetismo a la sociedad democrática. Globalización y política en el bicentenario, 2007
- Dimensiones sociales, políticas y culturales del desarrollo. Antología de Enzo Faletto (editor), 2007
- Neoliberalismo corregido y progresismo limitado. Los gobiernos de la Concertación en Chile, 1990-2010, 2012
- Las ciencias sociales en la trama de Chile y América Latina. Estudios sobre transformaciones sociopolíticas y movimiento social, 2014
- La gran ruptura. Institucionalidad política y actores sociales en el Chile del siglo XXI (coordinator), 2017
