= Tomás Moulian =

Chilean political scientist and sociologist (born 1939)

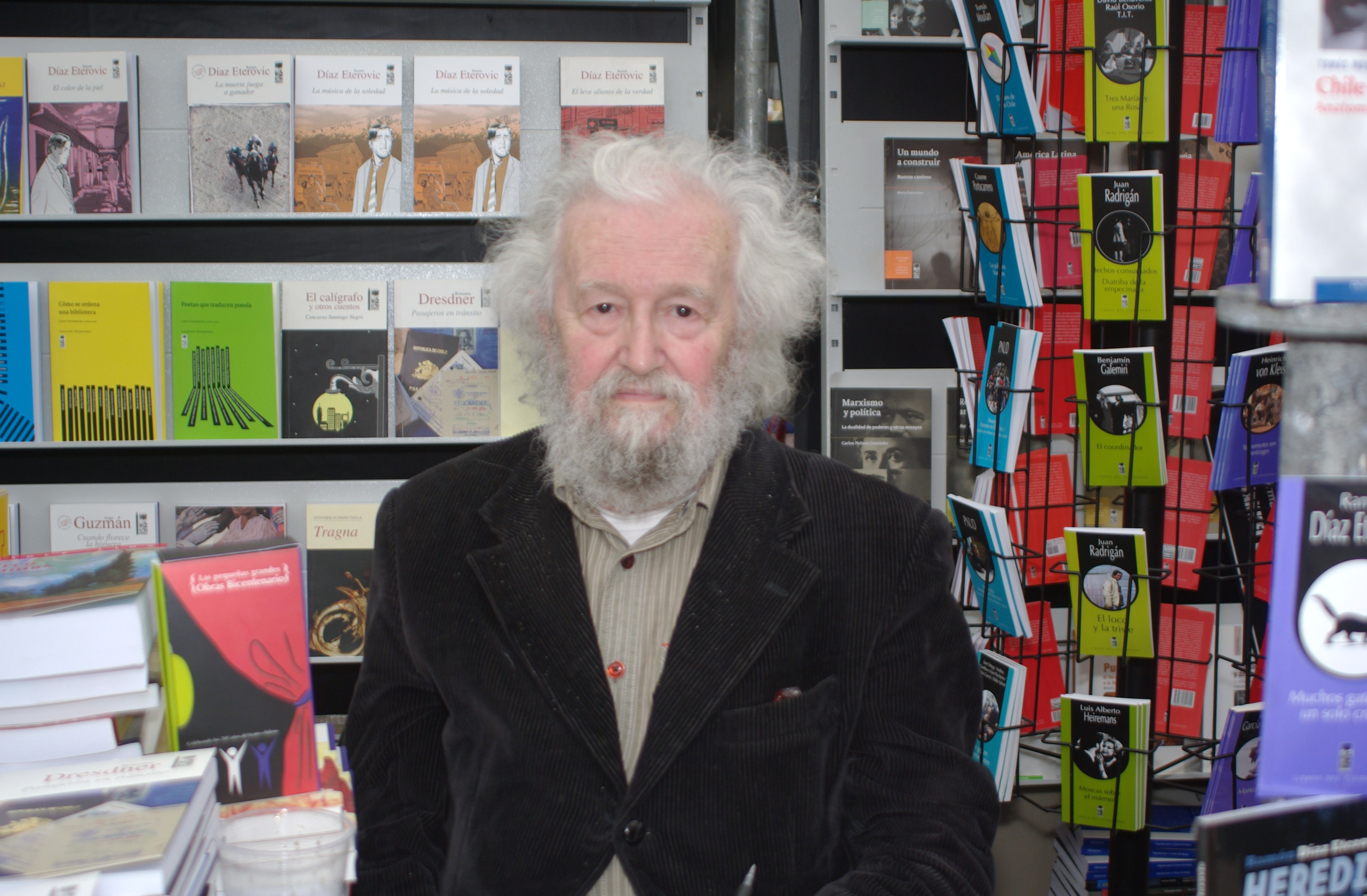
- At FILSA 2015
- Born: Tomás Moulian Emparanza; 21 September 1939 (age 86); Santiago, Chile
- Education: UCLouvain
- Occupations: Sociologist, political scientist
- Title: Rector of University ARCIS
- Term: 2003–2006
- Predecessor: Pedro Domancic
- Successor: Jorge Arrate
- Political party: Democratic Revolution (2016–present)
- Awards: Santiago Municipal Literature Award (1998); National Prize for Humanities and Social Sciences (2015)

Tomás Moulian Emparanza (born 21 September 1939) is a Chilean political scientist and sociologist. A Guggenheim Fellow and winner of the National Prize for Humanities and Social Sciences, he is known for being a critic of the socio-economic structure of his country after the dictatorship of Augusto Pinochet.

== Biography ==
The brother of historian Luis Moulian, and uncle of businessman Vasco Moulian, Tomás Moulian studied sociology at the Pontifical Catholic University of Chile (PUC), and did postgraduate studies at the University of Louvain (UCLouvain) in Belgium and Paris.

He was director of the sociology schools of his alma mater and of University ARCIS. At the latter he also served as Vice Chancellor for Research, and Rector from 2003 to 2006. He was deputy director of the Latin American Social Sciences Institute (FLACSO) in Chile (1990–1991), where he also taught from 1974 to 1994. He has been director of the Paulo Freire Institute of Social Training.

He was a member of the Christian Democratic Youth, and during the Popular Unity government he was a member of the MAPU Obrero Campesino. After the return of democracy he identified himself as an independent close to the Communist Party of Chile (PCCh). This same party proclaimed him presidential candidate for the 2005 election, where he finally yielded his selection to the humanist Tomás Hirsch.

== Thought ==
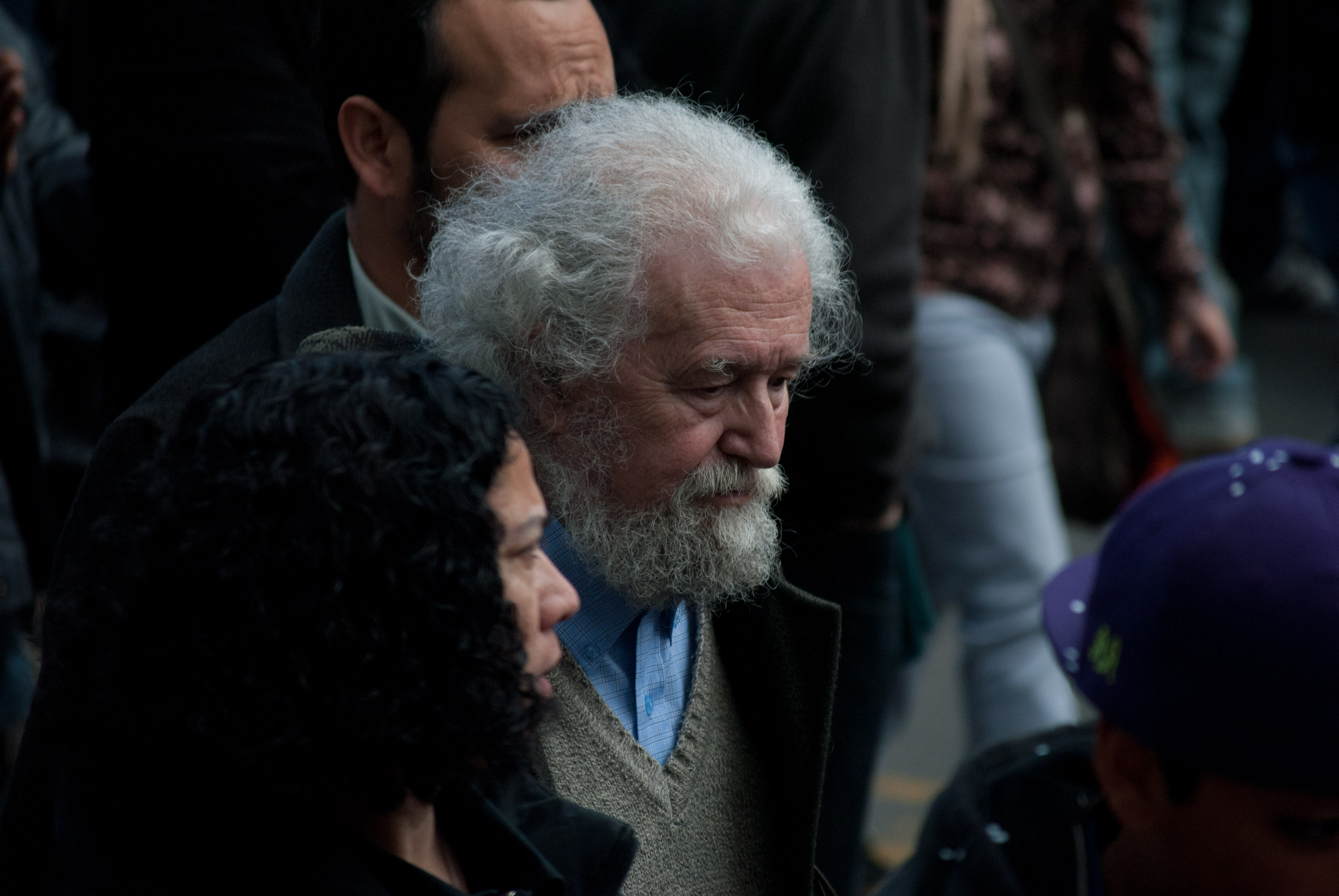
Moulian at the 2011 student protests

Moulian's works of historical interpretation of the 20th century have been very influential, despite not having the training of a historian. He has published works on the Popular Front, Popular Unity, and political projects of the right. In the same way, his reflections on the process experienced after the end of the Pinochet dictatorship have become prominent.

His 1997 essay Chile actual: anatomía de un mito – which won the Santiago Municipal Literature Award the following year and which has had several subsequent editions – is well-known. In this he unveiled the "transvestism" of the political sectors that led the transition towards democracy, who would have allowed the fundamental pillars of the fallen regime to remain.

== Works ==
- Discusiones entre honorables: las candidaturas presidenciales de la derecha entre 1938 y 1946, Santiago: FLACSO, 1987 (together with Isabel Torres Dujisin)
- La forja de ilusiones: El sistema de partidos, 1932-1973, FLACSO, 1993, ISBN 978-9567370016
- Crisis de los saberes y espacio universitario, 1995
- Chile actual: anatomía de un mito, Santiago: LOM Ediciones, 1997, ISBN 978-9562820226
- Conversación interrumpida con Allende, Universidad ARCIS, 1998, ISBN 978-9562821186
- El consumo me consume, Santiago: LOM Ediciones, 1999, ISBN 979-9562820805
- Socialismo del siglo XXI: La quinta via, Santiago: LOM Ediciones, 2000, ISBN 978-9562823265
- Ein Sozialismus für das 21. Jahrhundert, Zürich: Rotpunktverlag, 2003, ISBN 978-3858692658
- En la brecha. Derechos humanos, críticas y alternativas, Santiago: LOM Ediciones, 2002, ISBN 9789562825122
- De la política letrada a la política analfabeta, Santiago: LOM Ediciones, 2004, ISBN 978-9562820806
- Fracturas: de Pedro Aguirre Cerda a Salvador Allende (1938-1973), Santiago: LOM Ediciones, 2006, ISBN 978-9562828284
- Contradicciones del desarrollo político chileno, 1920-1990, Santiago de Chile: LOM Ediciones, 2009, ISBN 978-956-00-0075-0
