= José Zalaquett =

Chilean lawyer (1942–2020)

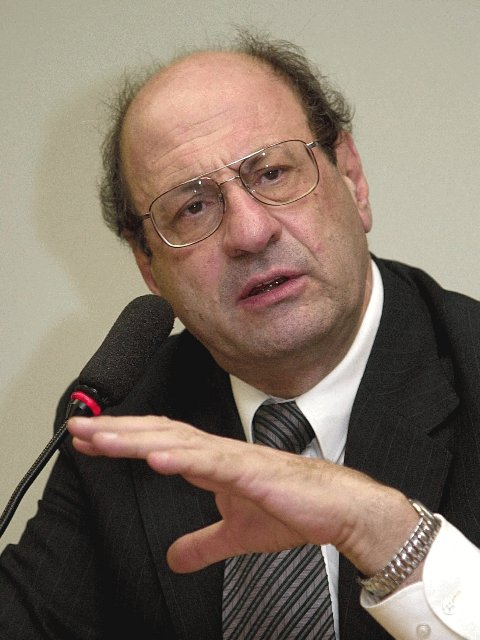
José Zalaquett, President of the IACHR, 2004–05 Photo: J. Freitas/ABr

José "Pepe" Zalaquett Daher (10 March 1942 – 15 February 2020) was a Chilean lawyer, renowned for his work in the defence of human rights during the de facto regime that governed Chile under General Augusto Pinochet from 1973 to 1990.

== The coup d'état and the Pro Paz Committee ==
Zalaquett graduated from the law school of the University of Chile in 1967.

Following the coup d'état of 11 September 1973, he became involved with the Comité Pro Paz, a non-governmental organization for human rights established by various Christian churches and other religious organizations on the initiative of Roman Catholic Cardinal Raúl Silva Henríquez. Serving as the director of its legal department from late 1973 until the committee was wound up in December 1975, his job was to direct and coordinate the efforts of internal and external lawyers in defending human rights. This entailed work in three broad areas:

- Serving as counsel for defendants accused by the military courts (consejos de guerra).
- Filing for constitutional relief and habeas corpus remedies (amparo) on behalf of detainees held by the military.
- Attempting to conduct investigations into the whereabouts of detainees.

On 15 November 1975, agents of the National Intelligence Directorate (DINA) arrested Zalaquett and took him to the Tres Álamos detention centre. He was released on 30 January 1976, arrested again on 5 April, and sent into exile on 12 April. He did not return to Chile until 1986.

During his years abroad, he served as the head of the international executive committee of Amnesty International from 1979 to 1982.

== Restoration of democracy ==
During Chile's transition to democracy, Zalaquett was appointed by President Patricio Aylwin to serve on the National Truth and Reconciliation Commission, a truth commission set up in 1990 to investigate human rights violations committed by the military regime. In 1999 and 2000 he served on the dialogue panel (mesa de diálogo) on human rights between members of the armed forces and human rights lawyers.

From 2002 to 2005 he served as a member of the Inter-American Commission on Human Rights, including a stint as its president in 2004–05.

== Academic work and awards ==
Zalaquett taught law at the University of Chile and lectured there in international human rights law and in ethics and government. He held Honoris Causa doctorates in law from the University of Notre Dame and City University of New York (United States). He was a member of the Geneva-based International Commission of Jurists and member of the board of the International Centre for Transitional Justice.

Along with Cecilia Medina, a Chilean judge on the Inter-American Court of Human Rights, Zalaquett directed the Human Rights Centre at the University of Chile's law school.

In 1994 UNESCO awarded him that year's Prize for Human Rights Education.

In 2003 he was awarded Chile's National Prize for Humanities and Social Sciences for his "contribution to the protection of the rights of individuals and of ethics in politics". In August 2006, Santiago's Alberto Hurtado University gave him the San Alberto Hurtado Medal in recognition of his human rights work. He was patron of the Media Legal Defence Initiative.

On 12 November 2009, in a ceremony at the Palacio de la Moneda he was given "The Notre Dame Prize", from the University of Notre Dame, that recognizes "the efforts of visionary leaders in Latin America to promote the welfare of the region by strengthening democracy and improving the quality of life of its citizens ".

From 2014, he conducted free online courses on Human Rights at the MOOC Chile project, from the Ford Foundation and the Universidad Diego Portales.

== Publications ==
- The Human Rights Issue and The Human Rights Movement. World Council of Churches, Geneva. (1982)
- Derechos Humanos y Limitaciones Politicas en las Transiciones Democraticas del Conosur. Colección Estudios Cieplan, Santiago. (1991)
- "Moral Reconstruction in the Wake of Human Rights Violations and War Crimes". In: Hard Choices: Moral Dilemmas Relating to Humanitarian Intervention. Edited by Jonathan Moore of the John F. Kennedy School of Government, University of Harvard, and sponsored by the International Committee of the Red Cross. Rowman & Littlefield Publishers, USA. (1998)
- Los Límites de la Tolerancia. Libertad de Expresion y Debate Publico en Chile. LOM Ediciones, Santiago de Chile. (1998)
- "Truth, Justice and Reconciliation: Lessons For The International Community". In: Comparative Peace Processes In Latin America. José Zalaquett Daher. Cynthia Arnson. Woodrow Wilson Center Press/Stanford University Press, Washington, D.C. (1999)
- Procesos de Transición a la Democracia y Políticas de Derechos Humanos en América Latina (1998)
- La reconstrucción de la unidad nacional y el legado de violaciones de los derechos humanos. (1999)
- La Mesa de Diálogo sobre Derechos Humanos y el proceso de transición política en Chile. (2000)
- "No hay mañana sin ayer”: Análisis de la propuesta del presidente Lagos sobre Derechos Humanos. (2003)
- Transparencia, rendición de cuentas y lucha contra la corrupción en América 2004. (2004)

== Sources ==
The earliest version of this article was translated, with minor adaptations, from the corresponding article on the Spanish-language Wikipedia.
