= Natalia Majluf =

Peruvian historian

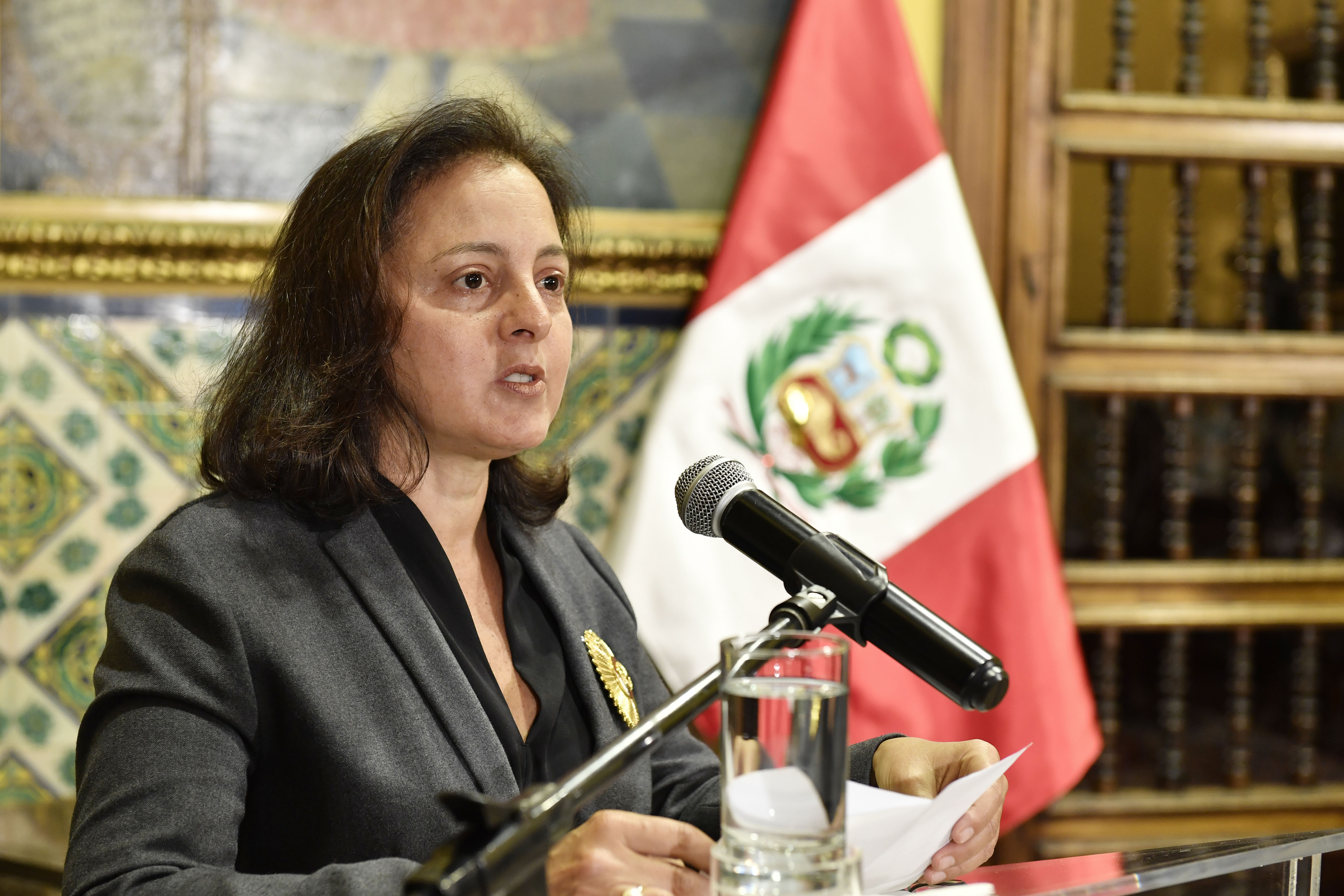
- Majluf in 2018
- Born: 1967 (age 58–59); Lima, Peru
- Occupations: Curator; historian
- Awards: Guggenheim Fellowship (2011)

Academic background
- Education: Boston College; New York University Institute of Fine Arts; University of Texas at Austin
- Thesis: The Creation of the Image of the Indian in 19th-Century Peru: The Paintings of Francisco Laso (1823-1869) (1995)
- Doctoral advisor: Jacqueline Barnitz

Academic work
- Discipline: Art history
- Sub-discipline: Peruvian art
- Institutions: Lima Art Museum

Natalia Majluf Brahim (born 1967) is a Peruvian curator and historian. She was head curator of the Lima Art Museum from 1995 to 2001, before serving as director from 2002 until 2018. She was a 2011 Guggenheim Fellow and the 2018-2019 Simón Bolívar Professor of Latin-American Studies, and wrote the 2022 book Inventing Indigenism.

== Biography ==
Majluf was born in 1967 in Lima, to a Palestinian-Peruvian family. She was educated at San Silvestre School. She got a BA at Boston College, earned an MA at the New York University Institute of Fine Arts in 1990, and a PhD at University of Texas at Austin in 1995. Her doctoral dissertation The Creation of the Image of the Indian in 19th-Century Peru: The Paintings of Francisco Laso (1823-1869) was supervised by Jacqueline Barnitz.

Majluf joined the Lima Art Museum (MALI) in 1988. In 1995, she became the first head curator of the museum, holding the position until 2001. In 2002, she became director of the museum. As director, she supervised a large repertoire of works and exhibitions in the field of Peruvian art. She also curated exhibitions outside of Peru, specifically at the Americas Society and the Musée du Quai Branly – Jacques Chirac. She was a University of Cambridge Centre of Latin American Studies (CLAS) Visiting Fellow in 2007. In 2011, she was awarded a Guggenheim Fellowship in History.

In 2018, Majluf stepped down as director of MALI to serve as Simón Bolívar Professor of Latin-American Studies at the CLAS, a position she held until the next year. She continued to operate as director of MALI's "Historias. Arte y cultura del Perú" resource page even after leaving MALI. She was a 2021-2022 Tinker Visiting Professor in Art History at the University of Chicago.

Majluf's historical research is centered around Latin American art (particularly Peruvian art) and post-colonial issues in visual art. She has edited and authored several exhibition catalogues and works, including El primer siglo de la fotografía: Perú, 1842-1942 (2001), Los Incas, reyes del Perú (2005), Tipos del Perú (2008), Luis Montero: The Funerals of Atahualpa (2011), Sabogal (2013) and Chambi (2015). In 2021, she published Inventing Indigenism, a history book on the depictions of indigenous people in painter Francisco Laso; it won the 2023 Association for Latin American Art Book Award. She worked for the Pontifical Catholic University of Peru's art history graduate program.

== Bibliography ==
- Inventing Indigenism (2022)
