= Sonia Montecino =

Chilean writer and anthropologist

Sonia Cristina Montecino Aguirre (born November 12, 1954) is a Chilean writer and anthropologist. In 2013, she was awarded the Premio Nacional de Humanidades y Ciencias Sociales (National Prize of Social Science and Humanities.)

== Biography ==
She studied Anthropology in Universidad de Chile where she graduated in 1980 and in 2016 she received her doctorate in Leiden University in Holland. She is married to the anthropologist Rolf Foerster González.

She has been an associate professor in the Department of Anthropology, Faculty of Social Sciences, and holder of the UNESCO Chair with a headquarter in the Interdisciplinary Center for Gender Studies of the aforementioned faculty, a center of which she was one of its founders and has been assistant director and director.

Sonia Montecino has also been editor of the Revista Chilena de Antropología at Universidad de Chile, as well as having been coordinator of the Magíster in Género y Cultura en las facultades de Ciencias Sociales y de Filosofía y Humanidades (Master in Gender and Culture at the faculties of Social Sciences and Philosophy and Humanities), and finally director of the Archivo Central Andrés Bello (August 2007.).

She has participated in numerous and varied cultural initiatives, from working in various committees to be a member of editorial boards of magazines (Rocinante, Hoja de Warmi, Mazorca.)

In July 2010, she was appointed Vice-Rector for Extensión y Comunicaciones at Universidad de Chile.

She has published essays, works of fiction, and numerous specialized articles. She has dedicated herself to the study of gender and ethnic identities, as well as to the relationships between anthropology and literature. Her work has received various awards.

== Awards ==
- 2005: Mujer Generación Siglo XXI (Universidad de Chile.)
- 2005: Prize Altazor Essay Award for Mitos de Chile. Diccionario de seres, magias y encantos.
- 2005: Prize Círculo de Cronistas Gastronómicos by Cocinas mestizas de Chile. La olla deleitosa.
- 2005: Gourmand World Cookbook Awards (category Best Culinary History Book in Spanish of Latin America) by Cocinas mestizas de Chile, la olla deleitosa.
- 2011: Award from the Association of Chefs of Chile Les Toques Blanches for her career as a culinary anthropologist.
- 2012: Prize Academia for Madres y huachos, alegorías del mestizaje chileno.
- 2013: Altazor Award Finalist, category of literature for children and young people, with Hazañas y Grandezas de los animales chilenos. Lecturas de mitos originarios para niños, niñas y jóvenes.
- 2013: National Prize for Humanities and Social Sciences (Chile)

== Works ==
=== Books ===
- Los sueños de Lucinda Nahuelhual, testimonial story; Santiago, Ediciones Pemci-Academia of Christian Humanism, Serie stories Nº1, 1983
- Ya me voy de este pueblo tan querido, testimonial story; Santiago, Ediciones Pemci-Academia of Christian Humanism, Serie stories Nº3, 1983
- Mujeres de la tierra, Santiago, Ediciones CEM-Pemci, 1984.
- Quinchamalí: reino de mujeres, Santiago, Ediciones Cem, 1985
- El zorro que cayó del cielo, oral tradition, Santiago, Ediciones Cem
- La revuelta, novel; Santiago, Ediciones del Ornitorrinco, 1988
- Madres y huachos. Alegorías del mestizaje chileno, Santiago: Cuarto Propio-CEDEM, 1991 (It has been edited by Sudamericana and in his fourth edition of Catalonia, in 2007
- Sangres cruzadas: mujeres chilenas y mestizaje, Santiago, SERNAM, 1993
- Ritos de vida y muerte: brujas y hechiceras, Santiago, SERNAM, 1994
- Sol Viejo, Sol Vieja. Lo femenino en la cultura mapuche, Santiago, SERNAM, 1996
- Modelando el barro. Celos y sueños de la alfarería, Santiago, SERNAM, 1996
- Palabra dicha. Ensayos sobre identidades, género y mestizaje, selection of articles and essays; published on Internet: Collection of electronics books, Serie: Studies, Social Cience faculty, Universidad de Chile, 1997.
- Juego de identidades y diferencias: representaciones de lo masculino en tres relatos de vida de hombres chilenos, PIEG, Social Cience Faculty, Universidad de Chile, 1999
- Sueño con menguante. Biografía de una Machi, Editorial Sudamericana, 1999
- Mitos de Chile: diccionario de seres, magias y encantos, Editorial Sudamericana, 2003
- Cocinas mestizas de Chile. La olla deleitosa, edited by the Museo de Arte Precolombino with the auspice of Banco Santander, Santiago, 2005
- Lucila se llama Gabriela, Ediciones Castillo, México D.F., 2006
- Materia y memoria. Tesoros patrimoniales de la Universidad de Chile, en coautoría con Alejandra Araya; Tinta Azul. Ediciones de la U. de Chile, Santiago, 2012
- Hazañas y grandezas de los animales chilenos. Lecturas de mitos originarios para niños, niñas y jóvenes, en coautoría con Catalina Infante e ilustraciones de Macarena Ortega; Catalonia, Santiago, 2012
- La tierra del cielo. Lecturas de mitos chilenos sobre los cuerpos celestes, con Catalina Infante and illustrations from Leonor Pérez; Catalonia, Santiago, 2017.

=== As a compiler ===
- 2005, Revisitando Chile: identidades, mitos e historias, Cuadernos Bicentenario Presidencia de la República, editor Arturo Infante.
- 2005, Reencantando Chile. Voces populares, Cuadernos Bicentenario, Santiago.
- 2007, Mujeres chilenas: fragmento de una historia, Ediciones Cátedra Género de la UNESCO-Catalonia.

=== Articles in specialized magazines ===
- Diversidad Cultural y equidad de género: avances y desafíos pendientes, en Persona y Sociedad, vol. 15 Nº1, May 2001, magazine ILADES
- Género y etnicidad una experiencia de aula, magazine VETAS del Colegio de San Luis, México, año IV, number from January to April, 2002
- Nuevas feminidades y masculinidades: Una mirada de género al mundo evangélico de La Pintana, Public center of studies Nº87, 2002, pp. 73–103
- Presentación del libro 'Emergencias' de Diamela Eltit, Anales de Literatura Chile, año 3, December 2002, Nº3, 151-157
- Piedras, mitos y comidas, antiguos sonidos de la cocina chilena. La Calapurca y el curanto, magazine Atenea, first semester 2003, Nº487, pp. 33–49, Universidad de Concepción
- El cuerpo femenino como 'circulante' del mercado, magazine Creaciones Ciudadanas, la sociabilidad chilena, Nº2, winter 2003
- Notas para una reflexión sobre las identidades de género en Chile. Tiempos de neomachismo y representaciones de lo femenino/masculino, magazine Testimonio Nº205, 2004, pp. 7–16
- Inicios de siglo y debates inconclusos, revista Análisis, Política, Economía, Sociedad, topics of the year 2003, Depto. de Sociología de la Facultad de Ciencias Sociales de la Universidad de Chile, 2004, pp. 111–117
- Signos de exclusión: Las relaciones de género y el juego de lo invisible/visible, magazine MAD. New exclusions in the contemporary complex Ediciones MAD, Universidad de Chile, pp. 139–148, 2006
- Reflexiones sobre oralidad y escritura, magazine Patrimonio Cultural; Calapurca, anniversary edition, 2007
