= Roberto Torretti =

Chilean philosopher, author and academic (1930–2022)

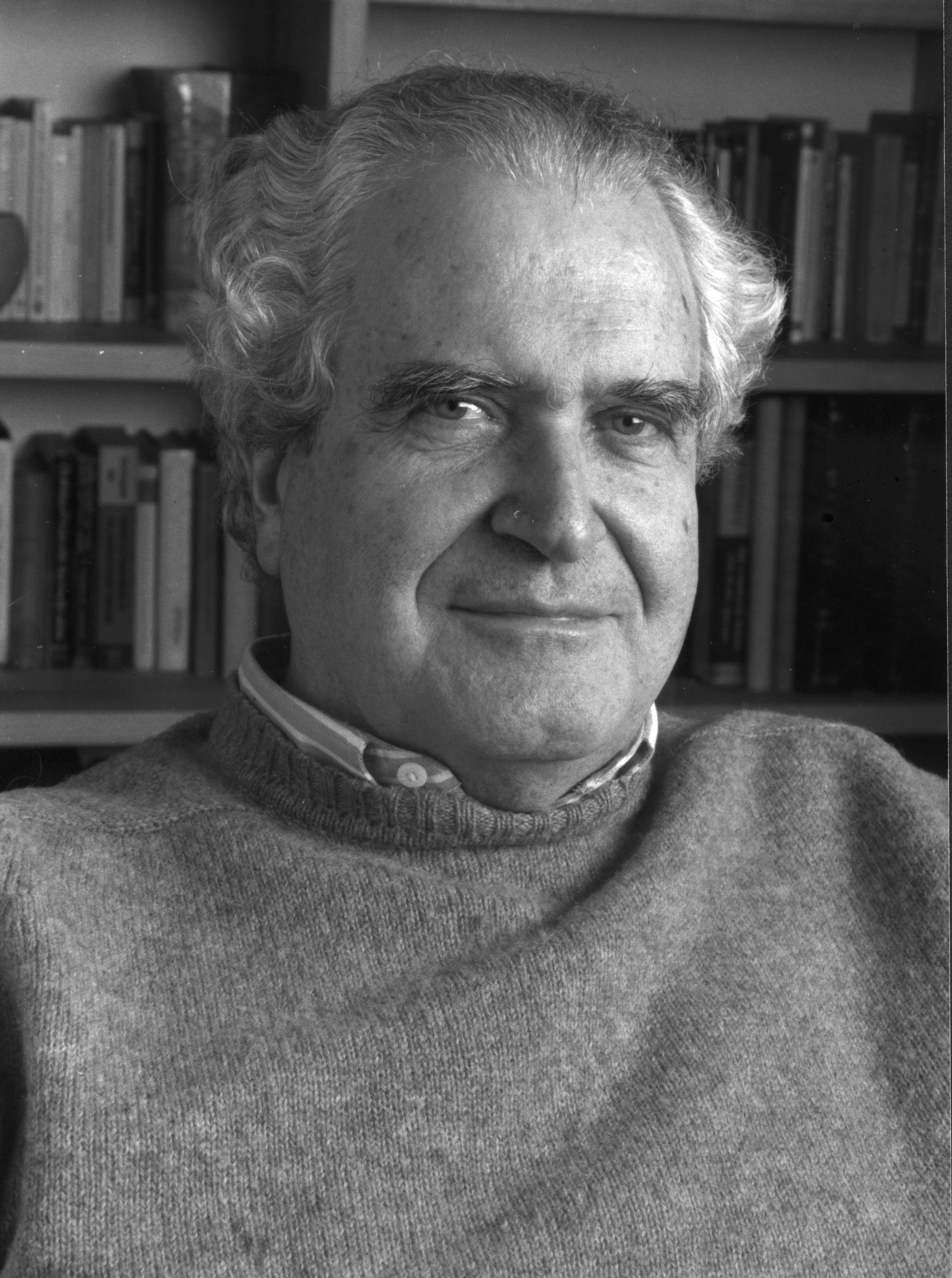
- Born: February 15, 1930; Santiago de Chile, Chile
- Died: November 12, 2022 (aged 92)
- Awards: National Prize for Humanities and Social Sciences (2011)

Education
- Education: University of Freiburg
- Doctoral advisor: Wilhelm Szilasi

Philosophical work
- Era: 20th-century philosophy
- Region: Western philosophy
- School: Pragmatic realism
- Main interests: History of philosophy, philosophy of physics, philosophy of mathematics

Roberto Torretti (February 15, 1930 – November 12, 2022) was a Chilean philosopher, author and academic who was internationally renowned for his contributions to the history of philosophy, philosophy of physics and philosophy of mathematics.

== Biography ==
Torretti received a doctorate from the University of Freiburg under the supervision of Wilhelm Szilasi in 1954. Shortly thereafter he began lecturing in philosophy and psychology at the Institute of Education of the University of Chile in Valparaíso. He also worked for the United Nations before commencing an academic career that lasted for more than forty years, during which he taught philosophy in the University of Puerto Rico and the University of Chile. Torretti was professor emeritus of the University of Puerto Rico, and a member of the Institut International de Philosophie. In April 2005 Torretti was awarded an honorary doctorate by the Universitat Autònoma de Barcelona in Spain. Torretti resided in Santiago, Chile and was married to the academic and philosopher Carla Cordua. In September 2011 Cordua and Torretti were jointly awarded the National Prize for Humanities and Social Sciences by the Republic of Chile.

Torretti died on November 12, 2022, at the age of 92.

== Philosophical work ==
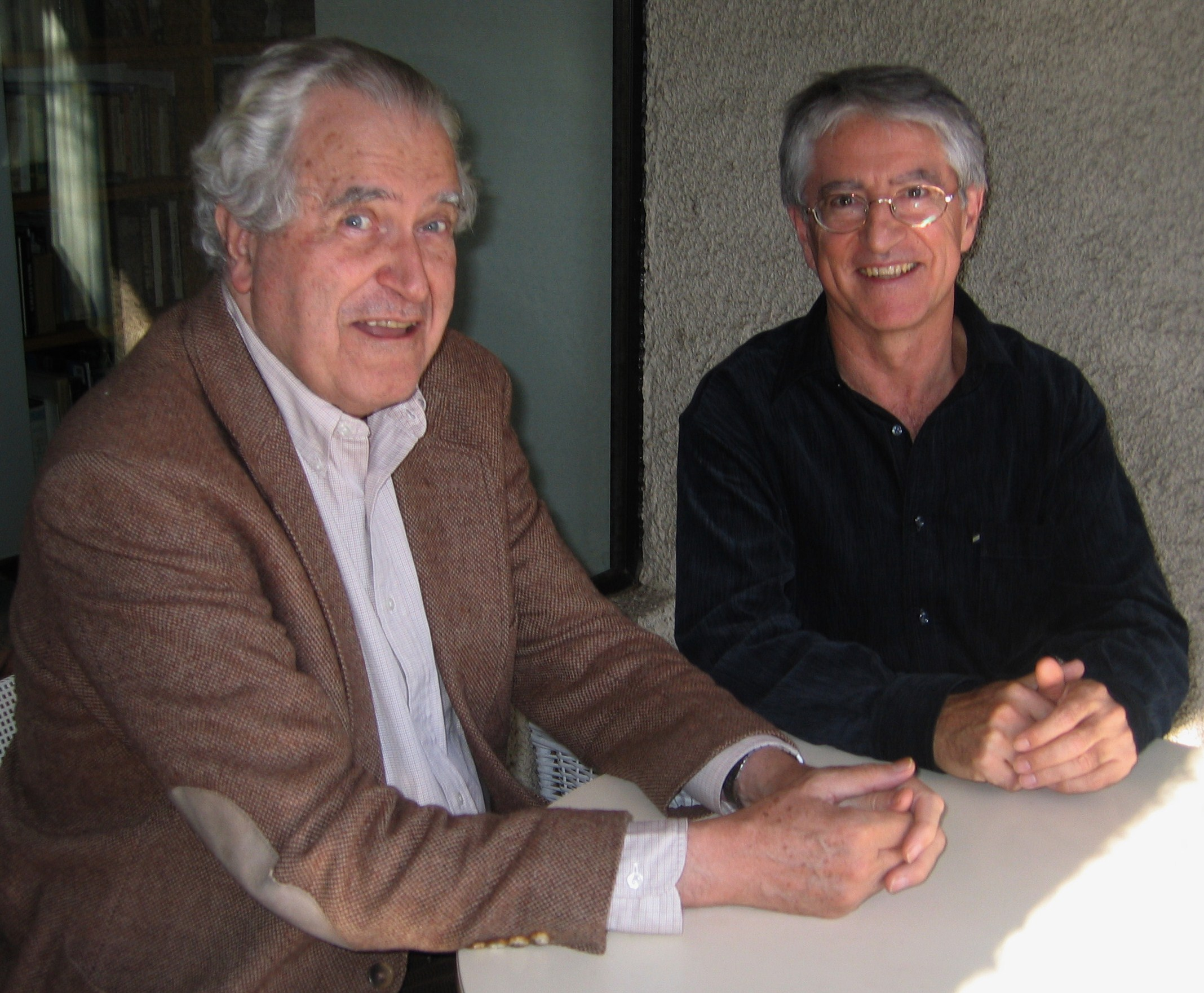
Roberto Torretti and Jesús Mosterín in Santiago (Chile) in 2004

Torretti was greatly influenced by the German philosopher Immanuel Kant and dedicated many of his works to Kant's thought. His work Manuel Kant: estudio sobre los fundamentos de la filosofia critica is considered one of the most important literary works on the thoughts of the 18th century German philosopher. Publications such as Philosophy of Geometry from Riemann to Poincaré (1978), Relativity and Geometry (1983) and El paraíso de Cantor (1998) made Torretti a leading authority on the philosophy of science. Much of Torretti's work dealt with physics and mathematics, with a major focus on relativity theory and 19th-century geometry. He devoted the book El Paraíso de Cantor to the set-theoretical tradition in logic and philosophy of mathematics. Together with Jesús Mosterín, he wrote an original and comprehensive dictionary of logic and philosophy of science.

== Academic awards ==
- National Prize for the Humanities, República de Chile, 2011
- Doctor honoris causa, Universitat Autonoma de Barcelona, 2005
- Fellow, Pittsburgh Center for the Philosophy of Science, 1983–1984
- John Simon Guggenheim Memorial Fellow, 1980–1981
- John Simon Guggenheim Memorial Fellow, 1975–1976
- Alexander-von-Humboldt Dozentenstipendiat, Kant-Archiv, Bonn, 1964–1965

== Bibliography ==
- Manuel Kant. Estudio sobre los fundamentos de la filosofía crítica. (1967, 4th edition 2013)
- Filosofía de la Naturaleza. Textos Antiguos y Modernos. (1971)
- Problemas de la Filosofía. Textos filosóficos clásicos y contemporáneos. (w. Luis O. Gómez) (1975)
- Philosophy of Geometry from Riemann to Poincaré. (1978)
- Relativity and Geometry. (1983)
- Creative Understanding: Philosophical Reflections on Physics. (1990)
- Variedad en la Razón: Ensayos sobre Kant. (w. Carla Cordua) (1992)
- La geometría del universo y otros ensayos de filosofía natural. (1994)
- Sophocles' Philoctetes. - Text and Commentary. (1997)
- El Paraíso de Cantor: La tradición conjuntista en la filosofía matemática. (1998)
- The Philosophy of Physics. (1999)
- Diccionario de lógica y filosofía de la ciencia. (w. Jesús Mosterín) (2002, 2nd edition 2010)
- Relatividad y espaciotiempo. (2003)
- Pensar la ciencia. [w. Miguel Espinoza]
- En el cielo solo las estrellas: Conversaciones con Roberto Torretti. (w. Eduardo Carrasco)
- Estudios filosóficos 1957-1987. (2006)
- Estudios filosóficos 1986-2006. (2007)
- De Eudoxo a Newton: Modelos matemáticos en la filosofía natural. (2007)
- Crítica filosófica y progreso científico. (2008)
- Estudios filosóficos 2007-2009. (2010)
- Estudios filosóficos 2010-2011. (2013)
- Estudios filosóficos 2011-2014. (2014)
- Perspectivas. (w. Carla Cordua). (2017).
- Por la razón o la fuerza: Tucídides 5.84-116. (2017).
