= Simón Bolívar Professor of Latin-American Studies =

The Simón Bolívar Chair in Latin American Studies is a visiting professorship at Cambridge University, funded by the Venezuelan government. It is awarded to a distinguished Latin American scholar or other intellectual. The position is associated with Cambridge's Centre for Latin American Studies.

== Former Simón Bolívar Professors ==
- 1968/1969 Arnoldo Gabaldón
- 1969/1970 Octavio Paz (Nobel Prize in Literature 1990)
- 1970/1971 Marcel Roche
- 1971/1972 Sergio Villalobos
- 1972/1973 Alvaro Jara
- 1973/1974 Celso Furtado
- 1974/1975 Pedro Grases
- 1975/1976 Ignacio Bernal
- 1976/1977 Fernando Henrique Cardoso
- 1977/1978 Mario Vargas Llosa (Nobel Prize in Literature 2010)
- 1979/1980 Tulio Arends
- 1981/1982 Pablo González Casanova
- 1982/1983 Ramón Escovar Salom
- 1985/1986 Allan Brewer Carias
- 1986/1987 Carlos Fuentes
- 1988/1989 Blas Bruni-Celli
- 1989/1990 Gustavo Gutiérrez
- 1991/1992 Beatriz Sarlo
- 1992/1993 Luis Castro Leiva
- 1993/1994 José de Souza Martins
- 1994/1995 Jaime Requena
- 1995/1996 Julio Ortega
- 1996/1997 Enrique Florescano
- 1997/1998 Eduardo Viveiros de Castro
- 1998/1999 Rodolfo Cerdas-Cruz
- 1999/2000 Enrique Tandeter
- 2000/2001 Fernando Pérez Oyarzún
- 2001/2002 Asdrúbal Baptista
- 2002/2003 Guillermo O'Donnell
- 2003/2004 Guillermo de la Peña
- 2004/2005 Mercedes González de la Rocha
- 2007/2008 José Luis Lanata
- 2008/2009 Scarlett O'Phelan Godoy
- 2009/2010 Carlos Iván Degregori
- 2010/2011 Fabián Michelangeli
- 2011/2012 Adrián Gorelik
- 2012/2013 Manuel Antonio Garretón
- 2013/2014 Rosalva Aida Hernández
- 2014/2015 Diamela Eltit
- 2015/2016 Leonardo Waisman
- 2016/2017 Antônio Sérgio Guimarães
- 2017/2018 Juan Fernando Calderón Gutiérrez
- 2018/2019 Natalia Majluf
- 2019/2020 Ángel Luis Viloria Petit
- 2022 Maristella Svampa
