= Humberto Giannini =

Chilean philosopher (1927–2014)

- Born: Humberto Giannini Íñiguez; 25 February 1927; San Bernardo, Chile
- Died: 25 November 2014 (aged 87); Santiago, Chile
- Education: University of Chile
- Occupation: Philosopher
- Organization: Academia Chilena de la Lengua (1998–2014)
- Awards: Santiago Municipal Literature Award (1982); National Prize for Humanities and Social Sciences (1999); Altazor Award (2009)

Humberto Giannini Íñiguez (25 February 1927 – 25 November 2014) was a Chilean philosopher of Italian descent. A disciple and continuator of Enrico Castelli, he was a member of the Academia Chilena de la Lengua and winner of the National Prize for Humanities and Social Sciences in 1999.

== Biography ==
The son of Osvaldo Giannini and Olga Íñiguez Maturana, Humberto Giannini was born in San Bernardo, and grew up in Valparaíso. He was the brother of deputy Osvaldo Giannini Iñíguez.

Giannini described his studies as "a life a bit uneven". He was thrown out of school because of discipline problems and was a sailor for two years. Then he resumed his studies at a night school and became "a great reader of philosophy." He enrolled at the University of Chile's Pedagogical Institute in 1953, where he would teach beginning in 1958, and where he would become, years later, professor emeritus and director of the UNESCO Chair of Philosophy based in Santiago.

He studied Hermeneutics and Philosophy of Religion at the Sapienza University of Rome, a two-year scholarship from the Italian government. His degree thesis was on the Metaphysics of Language. After the military coup of 11 September 1973, he got on "very badly...I received reprimands; they did not promote me for a long time and they suppressed the philosophy department of which I was director (at the Santiago North Headquarters of the University of Chile)."

In 1998 he was elected an active member of the Academia Chilena de la Lengua, where he occupied chair No. 12. That same year, he received the honorary title of Doctor Honoris Causa from Paris 8 University Vincennes-Saint-Denis.

Regarding his work, it has been said:

In the field of global and local contingency, his thinking is recognized as marked by the breaks of the certainties of the rationalist systems and by the crisis of political coexistence in Chile in 1973. His thinking is characterized by his reflection on the everyday that, for him, is much more than a theoretical formulation, because it is framed in the exercise of tolerance and in the practices of communicative and topographic coexistence. In its spatial aspect, the daily reflection is the route of journeys, since the highlighted human condition is that of assistant, whose identity is played in routines, journeys, pauses, and conversations. Under this imprint, the link with the world is emotional and political.

Several essays have been dedicated to his work, some of which have been collected in Humberto Giannini: filósofo de lo cotidiano (LOM Ediciones/Academy of Christian Humanism University, Santiago, 2010, ISBN 978-956-00-0204-4). In El pensamiento filosófico latinoamericano, del Caribe y 'latino' (1300–2000), edited by Enrique Dussel, Eduardo Mendieta, and Carmen Bohórquez, a section is dedicated to his thinking (Siglo XXI Editores/Crefal, Mexico, 2009).

== Death ==
On 25 November 2014, he fell into a coma and later died at Santiago's Clínica Santa María.

== Awards and distinctions ==
- Santiago Municipal Literature Award (1982)
- Manuel Montt Award (1993)
- Doctor Honoris Causa from the University of Paris (1998)
- National Prize for Humanities and Social Sciences (1999)
- National Book and Reading Council Award (2008), Essay category, for La metafísica eres tú
- Altazor Award (2009), Essay category, for La metafísica eres tú
- Jorge Millas Award (2012)
- Municipality of Ñuñoa Illustrious Distinction (2011) for his invaluable contribution to the world of philosophy and the humanities
- Juvenal Hernández Jaque Medal (2013)

== Selected works ==
- Reflexiones acerca de la convivencia humana (1965)
- El mito de la autenticidad (1968)
- Desde las palabras (1981)
- Breve Historia de la Filosofía (1985; numerous reprintings by Editorial Universitaria and Editorial Catalonia)
- La reflexión cotidiana: hacia una arqueología de la experiencia (1987; 6th edition in 2004), 338 pgs., ISBN 956-11-1720-7
- La experiencia moral (1992)
- Del bien que se espera y del bien que se debe (1997)
- El pasar del tiempo y su medida (2001), Editorial Universitaria, ISBN 956-11-1581-6
- La metafísica eres tú, Editorial Catalonia, 2007
