= Jesús Mosterín =

Spanish philosopher (1941–2017)

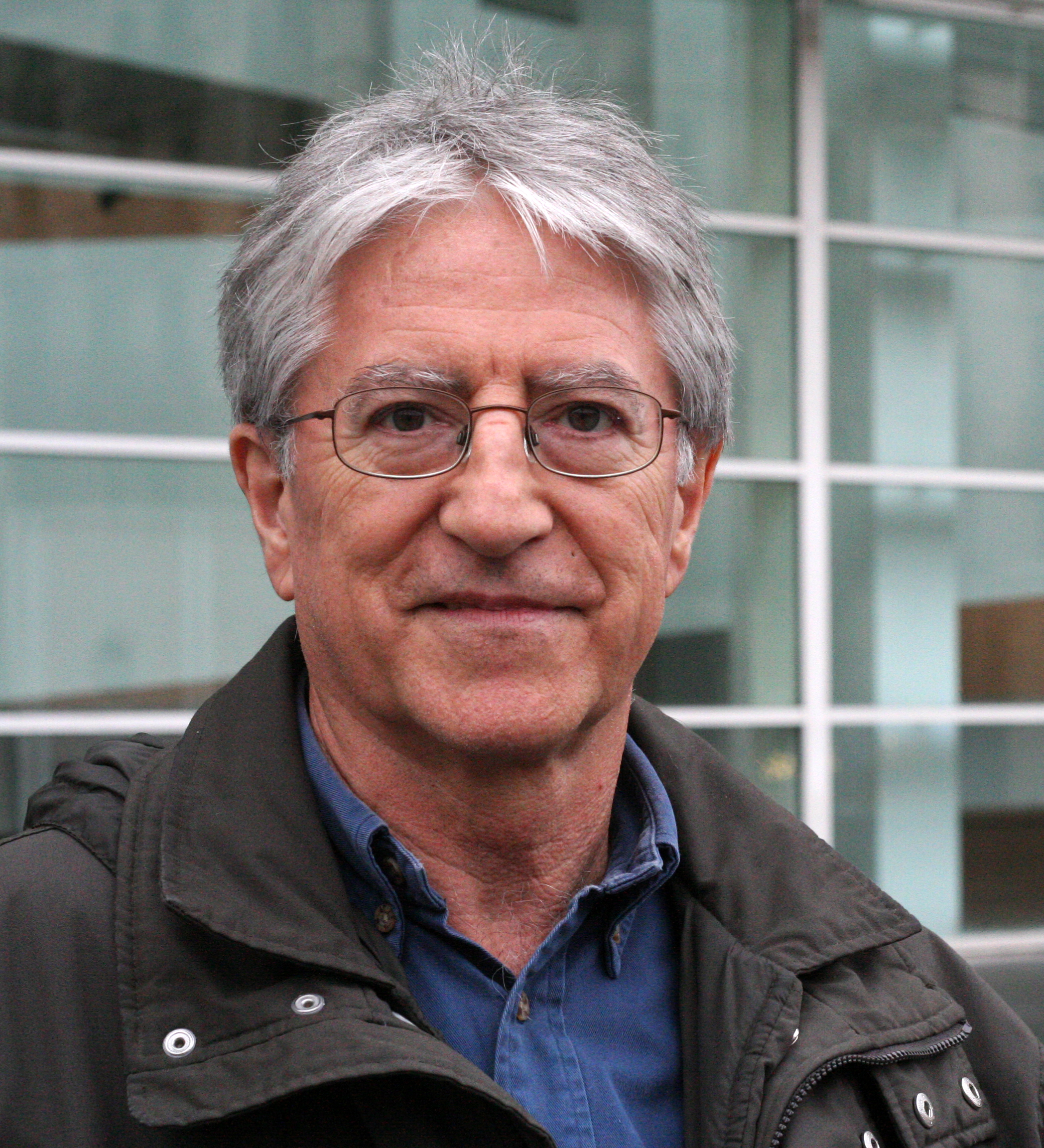
- Born: September 24, 1941; Bilbao, Spain
- Died: October 4, 2017 (aged 76)

Jesús Mosterín (24 September 1941 – 4 October 2017) was a leading Spanish philosopher and a thinker of broad spectrum, often at the frontier between science and philosophy.

== Biography ==
He was born in Bilbao in 1941. He studied in Spain, Germany, and the USA. Professor of Logic and Philosophy of Science at the University of Barcelona since 1983, he founded there an active Department of Logic, Philosophy and History of Science. From 1996, he was Research Professor at the National Research Council of Spain (CSIC). He was a fellow of the Center for Philosophy of Science in Pittsburgh and a member of several international academies. He played a crucial role in the introduction of mathematical logic, analytical philosophy and philosophy of science in Spain and Latin America. Besides his academic duties, he fulfilled important functions in the international publishing industry, especially in the Salvat and Hachette groups. He was actively involved in the protection of wildlife and its defense in the mass media. He died on October 4^{th} 2017 from pleural mesothelioma, caused by exposure to asbestos.

== Logic ==
Mosterín acquired his initial logical formation at the Institut für mathematische Logik und Grundlagenforschung in Münster (Germany). He published the first modern and rigorous textbooks of logic and set theory in Spanish. He has worked on topics of first and second order logic, axiomatic set theory, computability and complexity. He has shown how the uniform digitalization of each type of symbolic object (such as chromosomes, texts, pictures, movies or pieces of music) can be considered to implement a certain positional numbering system. This result gives a precise meaning to the notion that the set of natural numbers constitutes a universal library and indeed a universal data base. Mosterín has edited the first edition of the complete works of Kurt Gödel in any language. Together with Thomas Bonk, he has edited an unpublished book of Rudolf Carnap on axiomatics (in German). He has also delved in the historical and biographical aspects of the development of modern logic, as shown in his original work on the lives of Gottlob Frege, Georg Cantor, Bertrand Russell, John von Neumann, Kurt Gödel and Alan Turing, intertwined with a formal analysis of their main technical contributions.

== Philosophy of science ==
=== Concepts and theories in science ===
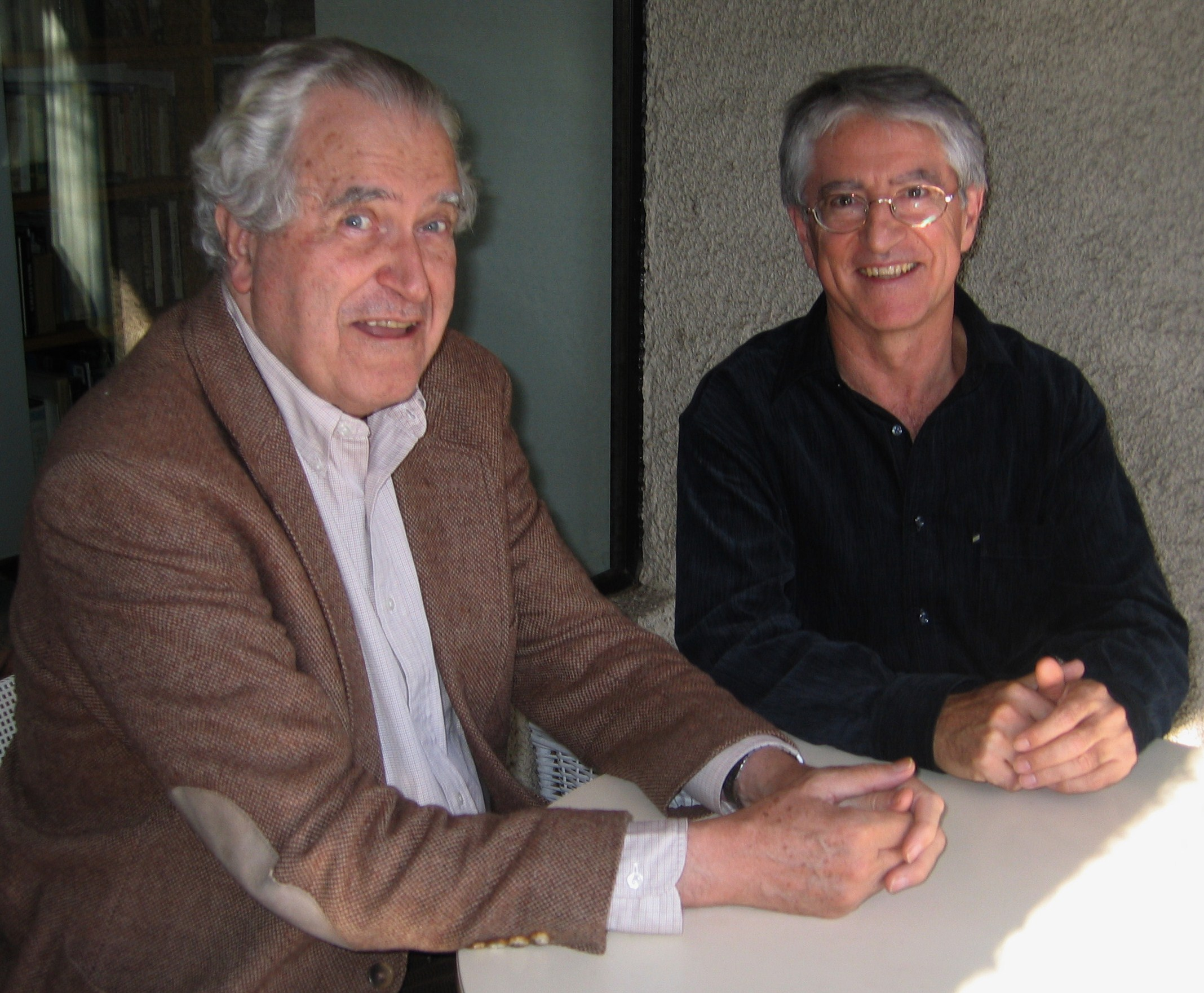
Roberto Torretti and Jesús Mosterín in Santiago (Chile) in 2004

Karl Popper tried to establish a criterion of demarcation between science and metaphysics, but the speculative turn taken by certain developments in theoretical physics has contributed to muddle the issue again. Mosterín has been concerned with the question of the reliability of theories and claims. He makes a distinction between the standard core of a scientific discipline, that at a certain point in time should only include relatively reliable and empirically supported ideas, and the cloud of speculative hypotheses surrounding it. Part of the theoretical progress consists in the incorporation of newly tested hypotheses of the cloud to the standard core. In this connection, he has analyzed epistemic notions like detection and observation. Observation, but not detection, is accompanied by awareness. Detection is always mediated by technological instruments, but observation only sometimes (like glasses in vision). The signals received by detectors have to be transduced into types of energy accessible to our senses. Following the path open by Patrick Suppes, Mosterín has paid much attention to the structure of metric concepts, because of their indispensable mediating role at the interface between theory and observation where reliability is tested. He has also made contributions to the study of mathematical modeling and of the limits of the axiomatic method in the characterization of real-world structures. The real world is extremely complex, and sometimes the best we can do is to apply the method of theoretical science: to pick up in the set-theoretical universe a mathematical structure with some formal similarities with the situation we are interested in, and use it as a model of that parcel of the world. Together with Roberto Torretti, Mosterín has written a uniquely comprehensive encyclopedic dictionary of logic and philosophy of science.

=== Philosophy of biology ===
Besides actively participating in the current discussions on evolutionary theory and genetics, Mosterín has also tackled issues like the definition of life itself or the ontology of biological organisms and species. Following in Aristotle’s and Schrödinger’s footsteps, he has been asking the simple question: what is life? He has analyzed the main proposed definitions, based on metabolism, reproduction, thermodynamics, complexity and evolution, and found all of them wanting. It is true that all organisms on Earth share many characteristics, from the encoding of genetic information in DNA to the storage of energy in ATP, but these common features merely reflect the inheritance from a common ancestor that possibly acquired them in a random way. From that point of view, our biology is the parochial science of life on Earth, rather than a universal science of life in general. Such a general biology seems impossible, as long as we do not detect and come to know other forms of life in the galaxy (if they exist). Concerning the ontological thesis of Michael Ghiselin and David Hull on the individuality of biological species, Mosterín shows that they are neither classes nor individuals in the usual meaning of these words. He tries to extend and make more precise the available conceptual framework of the discussion. Specifically, he shows the formal equivalence of the set-theoretical and the mereological (or part and individual) approach, so that everything that can be said about the classes can be translated into the jargon of individuals, and the other way around. All these concerns converge in his recent philosophy of animality, which combines the ontology of animals as paradigmatic individuals with the insights and results of biological research. This general theory of animals provides a solid foundation for the development of anthropology, conceived as the science of human primates.

=== Philosophy of cosmology ===
The role of our scientific image of the universe in a rational world view has always caught the attention of Mosterín. He has devoted much work to the epistemic analysis of cosmological theories and of the reliability of their claims. Together with John Earman, he has undertaken a thorough critical review of the paradigm of cosmic inflation. Earman and Mosterín conclude that, despite the widespread influence of the inflationary paradigm and the fact that it does not contradict any known results, there are as yet no good grounds for admitting any of the models of inflation into the standard core of scientific cosmology. He has also dealt with the role of speculation in cosmology. In particular, Mosterín has shown the multiple misunderstandings underlying the so-called anthropic principle and the use of anthropic explanations in cosmology. Mosterín concludes that "in its weak version, the anthropic principle is a mere tautology, which does not allow us to explain anything or to predict anything that we did not already know. In its strong version, it is a gratuitous speculation". Mosterín also points to the flawed “anthropic” inferences from the assumption of an infinity of worlds to the existence of one like ours:

“The suggestion that an infinity of objects characterized by certain numbers or properties implies the existence among them of objects with any combination of those numbers or characteristics [...] is mistaken. An infinity does not imply at all that any arrangement is present or repeated. [...] The assumption that all possible worlds are realized in an infinite universe is equivalent to the assertion that any infinite set of numbers contains all numbers (or at least all Gödel numbers of the [defining] sequences), which is obviously false.”

== Practical philosophy ==
=== Theory of rationality ===
Kant had distinguished theoretical from practical reason. Rationality theorist Jesús Mosterín makes a parallel distinction between theoretical and practical rationality, although, according to him, reason and rationality are not the same: reason would be a psychological faculty, whereas rationality is an optimizing strategy. Humans are not rational by definition, but they can think and behave rationally or not, depending on whether they apply, explicitly or implicitly, the strategy of theoretical and practical rationality to the thoughts they accept and to the actions they perform. Theoretical rationality has a formal component that reduces to logical consistency and a material component that reduces to empirical support, relying on our inborn mechanisms of signal detection and interpretation. Mosterín distinguishes between involuntary and implicit belief, on the one hand, and voluntary and explicit acceptance, on the other. Theoretical rationality can more properly be said to regulate our acceptances than our beliefs. Practical rationality is the strategy for living one's best possible life, achieving your most important goals and your own preferences in as far as possible. Practical rationality has also a formal component, that reduces to Bayesian decision theory, and a material component, rooted in human nature (lastly, in our genome).

=== Ethics, animals and rights ===
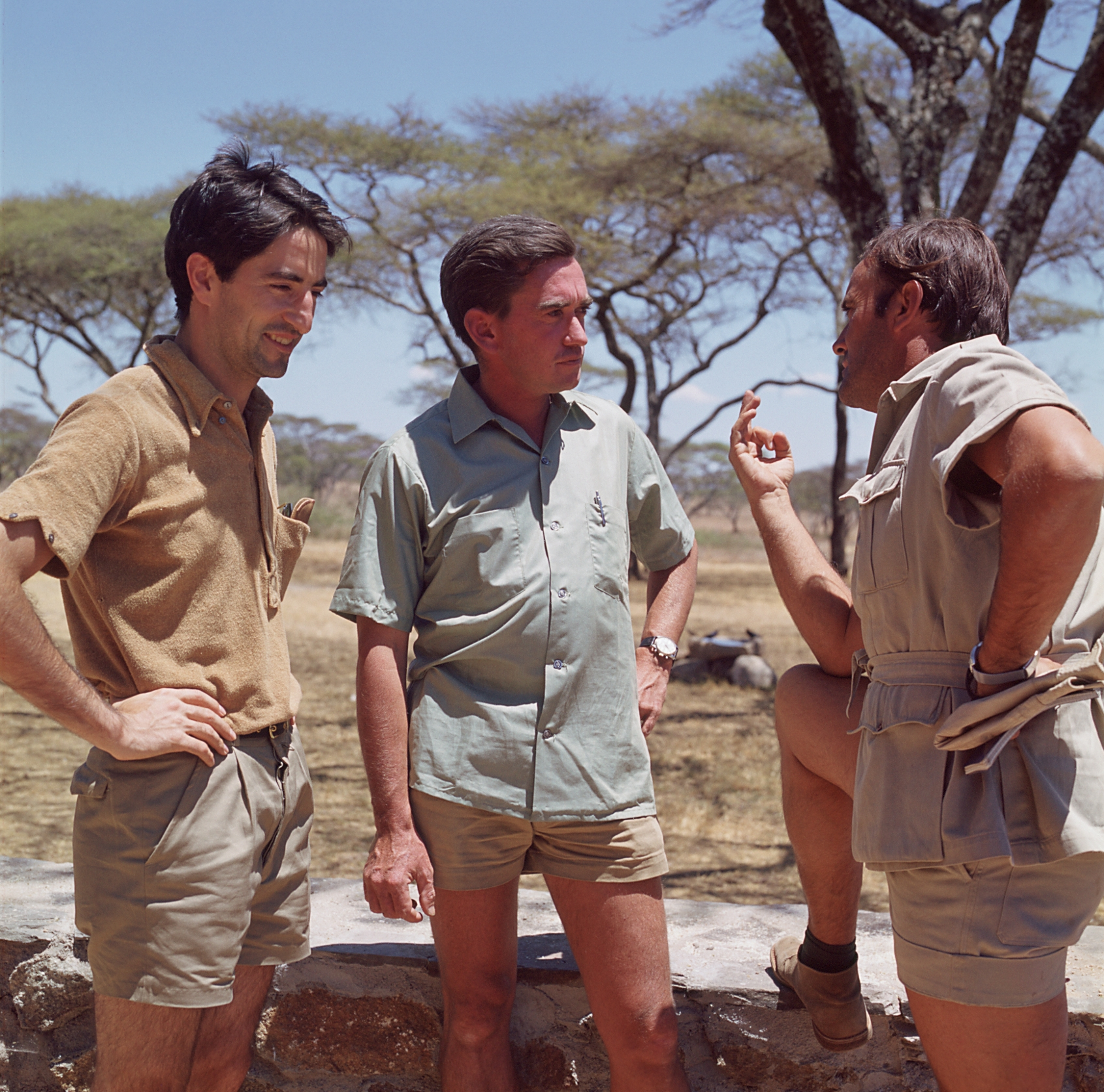
Jesús Mosterín, Hugo van Lawick and Félix Rodríguez de la Fuente in Africa in 1969

Mosterín's interest in wildlife led to an early collaboration with Félix Rodríguez de la Fuente, the famous Spanish naturalist and documentary director, for promoting public awareness and appreciation of wild nature; this included the successful Fauna Encyclopedia. Opposed to all spectacles of cruelty, Mosterín has taken a firm stand against bullfighting. He contributed decisively to the discussion leading to the ban of bullfights in Catalonia (Spain) in 2010. Subsequently, he has published two books analyzing this cruel tradition and offering a devastating refutation of all proposed attempts to justify it. As honorary president of the Spanish Great Ape Project, he has cooperated with Peter Singer in advocating certain minimal legal rights for great apes. While firmly rejecting all forms of gross cruelty to animals, Mosterín has adopted a realist point of view in the controversies about the use of animals in research and nutrition, taking into account the various dimensions of the problems and insisting in the implementation of obligatory standards of animal welfare. He proposes the elimination of unnecessary and painful experiments, the abolition of factory farming based on confinement that prevents animals from displaying their genetically programmed behavior, and stopping the specially destructive and cruel forms of commercial fisheries like bottom trawling. In as far as meat continues to be eaten in the future, Mosterín suggests that the steaks could be grown in vitro from stem cells.

As a moral philosopher, Mosterín does not believe in the existence of intrinsic or natural rights (neither for animals in general nor for humans in particular), but he thinks that any political society can create rights through legislative action. Following Hume and Darwin, and taking into account Giacomo Rizzolatti’s results on mirror neurons, Mosterín suggests that our inborn capacity for compassion, fed by knowledge and empathy, is a more solid basis for the moral consideration of non-human animals than abstract and uncheckable speculations about intrinsic rights. This fits his emphasis on the relevance of moral emotions (like compassion) to ethics, somehow comparable with the role played by perception in empirical science.

=== Political philosophy ===
Modern liberal democracy is a compromise between the twin ideals of freedom and democracy. Mosterín emphasizes their differences: freedom comes down to doing what I want to do; democracy, to doing what (the majority of) the others want me to do. Rejecting as muddled the metaphysical notion of free will, he focuses on political freedom, the absence of coercion or interference by others in my personal decisions. Because of the tendencies to violence and aggression that lurk in human nature, some constraint on freedom is necessary for peaceful and fruitful social life, but the more freedom we enjoy, the better. Especially, there is no rational ground for curtailing the cultural freedoms (of language, religion and customs) in the name of the nation, the church or the party. From this point of view, Internet provides a much more attractive model than the obsolete nation-state or the nationalistic movements. Mosterín thinks that the nation-state is incompatible with the full development of freedom, whose blossoming requires the reorganization of the world political system along cosmopolitan lines. He proposes a world without nation-states, territorially organized in small autonomous but not-sovereign cantonal polities, complemented by strong world organizations.

== Anthropology ==
=== Human nature ===
The 21st century has witnessed a vigorous revival of the idea of human nature in the hands of authors like Edward Wilson, Steven Pinker and Jesús Mosterín. The successful sequencing of the human genome and the ongoing research on the function of genes and of regulatory sequences, together with the insights on the workings of the brain, have brought a new actuality and significance to this classical notion. According to Mosterín, the nature of our species Homo sapiens is the information genetically transmitted and present in the human genome (in the genetic pool). Your individual nature lies in your own genome, present in the chromosomes of your cells. The human genome has a layered structure and (up to a point) recapitulates the history of our human lineage. The oldest and deepest strata of our nature represent the living functions common to all life on Earth. Subsequent strata reflect later novelties. The newest layers are devoted to the most recent acquisitions, like bipedalism, grip of precision, large brain cortex, language and other abstract or recursive cognitive processes. Mosterín has dealt with the methods and criteria for distinguishing natural from cultural aspects of human capacities and behaviors and has provided a solid basis to theoretical anthropology. He has also engaged in the discussion and clarification of bioethical issues, like research with embryonic stem cells, birth control, abortion and euthanasia, taking always a scientific point of view and a position in favor of human freedom.

=== Human culture ===
Building on the wide understanding of culture brought about by cultural anthropology, archeology and biology, Mosterín has developed a new philosophical understanding of what culture is, where it is localized and how it evolves in time. Human nature is information, and so is human culture, but both are distinguished by their different means of transmission: whereas nature is transmitted genetically and is encoded in the genome, culture is transmitted through social learning and is encoded in the brain. Only individuals have a brain, and only they have a culture. Talk of collective cultures has to be understood as a statistical artifact for talking about a plurality of individual cultures. The set of elementary chunks of culture (variously known as memes, cultural variants or cultural traits) codified as neuronal circuits in the long term memory of the individual make up that individual's culture. Corresponding to the different uses of ‘culture’ in ordinary and scientific language, Mosterín defines several notions of collective culture, going from the cultural pool (the union of the cultures of all individuals of the group) to the unanimous culture (the intersection of all those cultures). In 2009 he has completed a thoroughgoing analysis of the forces driving cultural change, paying special attention to the role of Internet and other factors of information technology. He considers that preserving the freedom and efficiency of Internet is crucial for the future thriving of human culture.

== History of philosophy ==
An admirer of Bertrand Russell’s History of Western Philosophy, whose foreword he composed, as well as a critic of some of its shortcomings, Mosterín had undertaken the ambitious plan of writing all by himself a universal history of thought, not only Western, but also Asian and even Archaic. His series of books on Historia del Pensamiento aims at covering all main intellectual traditions from an interdisciplinary approach dealing simultaneously with developments in philosophy, science and ideology. The analysis of the ideas is critical and uncompromising, combining rigor with clarity and straightforward language. Besides, he delves into the arguments and does not hesitate to dig out their eventual flaws.

Some of the books of the series are devoted, for example, to Archaic thought, Aristotle and the philosophy of India. The examination of Archaic thought delves mainly into the intellectual contributions of old Mesopotamia, well documented in the cuneiform texts. Aristotle is presented not only as a philosopher, but also as a seminal scientist in different fields. The volume on India, besides dealing with linguistics and mathematics, contains a compact presentation of the main philosophical schools, from the Upanishad, through the Jaina and Buddhist developments, to the Advaita Vedanta of Shankara, which obviously attracts the author.

The three most recent volumes of the series, devoted to the Jews, the Christians and the Muslims, deal with the different traditions of monotheism. The Jewish tradition is presented as the source of the others. The Jewish myths are not spared, but a deeply sympathetic position is taken to such important thinkers as Maimonides (ben Maimon), Spinoza and Albert Einstein. The book on the Christians is the largest of the series. Jesus is presented as a typical Jew. Most of the original Christian ideas come from Paul, not from Jesus. After Constantine became a sort of Christian, theological discussions about such issues as the Holy Trinity were settled by force. The intellectual contributions of the main Christian thinkers (like Augustine, Thomas Aquinas and Luther) are analyzed and evaluated, but also the great historical processes are covered, like the Crusades, the universities, the Reformation and Counter-Reformation. Less attention is devoted to the last two centuries, as Mosterin thinks that in this period Christianity has decoupled itself from all new developments in science and philosophy, and Christian ideas have become increasingly irrelevant. The book devoted to Islam offers a critical description of the formation of the Quran and of the history of Muslim law, theology, Sufism, philosophy, mathematics and empirical science. Special attention is paid to the main thinkers of the period of splendor of Islamic civilization (8th to 12th centuries), like Avicenna, Averroes, Omar Khayyam and Al-Khwarizmi. The coverage of the contemporary period is more superficial, but up-to-date, as Mosterín deals with the 2011 Arab revolutions and gives his own assessment of the actual Islamic dilemmas.

== See also ==
- List of animal rights advocates

== Works ==
- El triunfo de la compasión: Nuestra relación con los otros animales [Triumph of Compassion: Our Relation with the other Animals]. Madrid: Alianza Editorial, 2014. 354 pp. ISBN 978-84-206-8465-9.
- Ciencia, filosofía y racionalidad [Science, Philosophy and Rationality]. Barcelona: Gedisa Editorial, 2013. 358 pp. ISBN 978-84-9784-776-6.
- El reino de los animales [The Kingdom of Animals]. Madrid: Alianza Editorial, 2013. 403 pp. ISBN 978-84-206-7450-6.
- El islam: Historia del pensamiento [History of Islamic Thought]. Madrid: Alianza Editorial, 2012. 403 pp. ISBN 978-84-206-6991-5.
- Epistemología y racionalidad [Epistemology and Rationality], 3rd edition. Lima: Fondo Editorial UIGV, 2011. 376 pp. ISBN 978-612-4050-16-9.
- A favor de los toros [In Favor of Bulls]. Pamplona: Editorial Laetoli, 2010. 120 pp. ISBN 978-84-92422-23-4.
- Diccionario de Lógica y Filosofía de la Ciencia [Dictionary of Logic and Philosophy of Science] (coauthored with Roberto Torretti), 2nd edition. Madrid: Alianza Editorial, 2010. 690 pp. ISBN 978-84-206-8299-0.
- Naturaleza, vida y cultura [Nature, Life and Culture]. Lima: Fondo Editorial UIGV, 2010. 160 pp. ISBN 978-612-4050-12-1.
- Los cristianos: Historia del pensamiento [History of Christian Thought]. Madrid: Alianza Editorial, 2010. 554 pp. ISBN 978-84-206-4979-5
- La cultura humana [Human Culture]. Madrid: Espasa-Calpe, 2009. 404 pp. ISBN 978-84-670-3085-3.
- La cultura de la libertad [The Culture of Freedom]. Madrid: Espasa-Calpe, 2008. 304 pp. ISBN 978-84670-2697-9.
- Lo mejor posible: Racionalidad y acción humana [The best possible: Rationality and Human Action]. Madrid: Alianza Editorial, 2008. 318 pp. ISBN 978-84-206-8206-8.
- La naturaleza humana [Human Nature], 2nd edition, Austral series. Madrid: Espasa Calpe, 2008. ISBN 978-84-670-2813-3.
- Los lógicos [The Logicians], 2nd edition, Austral series. Madrid: Espasa Calpe, 2007. 418 pp. ISBN 978-84-670-2507-1.
- Helenismo: Historia del pensamiento [History of Hellenistic Thought]. Madrid: Alianza Editorial, 2007. ISBN 978-84-206-6187-2.
- India: Historia del pensamiento [History of Indian Thought]. Madrid: Alianza Editorial, 2007. 260 pp. ISBN 978-84-206-6188-9.
- China: Historia del pensamiento [History of Chinese Thought]. Madrid: Alianza Editorial, 2007. 282 pp. ISBN 978-84-206-6187-2.
- Kurt Gödel, Obras completas [Complete Works], 2nd enlarged edition. Madrid: Alianza Editorial, 2006. 470 pp. ISBN 84-206-4773-X.
- Ciencia viva: Reflexiones sobre la aventura intelectual de nuestro tiempo [Living Science: Reflections on the Intellectual Adventure of Our Time], 2nd enlarged edition. Madrid: Espasa-Calpe, 2006. 386 pp. ISBN 84-670-2355-4.
- Crisis de los paradigmas en el siglo XXI [Crisis of 21st Century Paradigms]. Copublished by University Inca Garcilaso and University Enrique Guzmán. Lima, 2006. ISBN 9972-888-38-X.
- La naturaleza humana [Human Nature]. Madrid: Espasa-Calpe, 2006. 418 pp. ISBN 84-670-2035-0.
- El pensamiento arcaico [History of Archaic Thought]. Madrid: Alianza Editorial, 2006. 285 pp. ISBN 84-206-5833-2.
- La Hélade [History of Greek Thought]. Madrid: Alianza Editorial, 2006. 292 pp. ISBN 84-206-5833-2.
- Aristóteles [Aristotle]. Madrid: Alianza Editorial, 2006. 378 pp. ISBN 978-84-206-5836-0.
- Los judíos [History of Jewish Thought] . Madrid: Alianza Editorial, 2006. 305 pp. ISBN 84-206-5837-5.
- Diccionario de Lógica y Filosofía de la Ciencia [Dictionary of Logic and Philosophy of Science] (coauthored with Roberto Torretti). Madrid: Alianza Editorial, 2002. 670 pp. ISBN 84-206-3000-4.
- Teoría de la Escritura [Theory of Writing], 2nd edition. Icaria Editorial. Barcelona 2002. 384 pp. ISBN 84-7426-199-6.
- Filosofía y ciencias [Philosophy and Science]. Lima: Fondo Editorial UIGV y Editorial de la Universidad P. A. Orrego, 2002. 156 pp. ISBN 9972-888-04-5.
- Ciencia viva: Reflexiones sobre la aventura intelectual de nuestro tiempo [Living Science: Reflections on the Intellectual Adventure of Our Time]. Madrid: Espasa-Calpe, 2001. 382 pp. ISBN 84-239-9765-0.
- Conceptos y teorías en la ciencia [Concepts and Theories in Science], 3rd, enlarged edition. Madrid: Alianza Editorial, 2000. 318 pp. ISBN 84-206-6741-2.
- [Original edition of] Rudolf Carnap, Untersuchungen zur allgemeinen Axiomatik [Investigations on the general theory of axiomatic systems], coedited with Thomas Bonk. Darmstadt: Wissenschaftliche Buchgesellschaft, 2000. 166 pp. ISBN 3-534-14298-5.
- Los Lógicos [The Logicians]. Madrid: Espasa-Calpe, 2000. 324 pp. ISBN 84-239-9755-3.
- ¡Vivan los animales! [Long Live to the Animals!]. Madrid: Editorial Debate, 1998. 391 pp. ISBN 84-8306-141-4.
- Los derechos de los animales [Animals’ Rights]. Madrid: Editorial Debate, 1995. 111 pp. ISBN 84-7444-857-3.
- El pensamiento de la India [Indian Thought]. Barcelona: Salvat Editores, 1982. 65 pp. ISBN 84-345-7864-6.
- Ortografía fonémica del español [Phonemic Spelling for Spanish]. Madrid: Alianza Editorial, 1981. 205 pp. ISBN 84-206-2303-2.
- Un cálculo deductivo para la lógica de segundo orden [Deductive Calculus for Second Order Logic]. Valencia: Cuadernos Teorema, 1979. 52 pp. ISBN 84-370-0100-5.
- Racionalidad y acción humana [Rationality and Human Action]. Madrid: Alianza Editorial, 1978, 1987. 199 pp. y 218 pp. ISBN 84-206-2223-0.
- Teoría axiomática de conjuntos [Axiomatic Set Theory]. Barcelona: Ariel, 1971, 1980. 141 pp. ISBN 84-344-1003-6.
- Lógica de primer orden [First-order Logic]. Barcelona: Ariel, 1970, 1976, 1983. 141 pp. ISBN 84-344-1003-6.
