= Osvaldo Giannini =

Chilean politician

Member of the Chamber of Deputies of Chile
- In office 15 May 1965 – 15 May 1973

Personal details
- Born: 6 April 1934 Valparaíso, Chile
- Died: 1 September 1999 (aged 65) Valparaíso, Chile
- Party: National Falange (1952−1957); Christian Democratic Party (1957−1971); Christian Left (1971)
- Children: Five
- Relatives: Humberto (brother)
- Education: Pontifical Catholic University of Valparaíso (BA)
- Profession: Lawyer

Osvaldo Giannini Iñíguez (6 April 1934−1 September 1999) was a Chilean lawyer and politician who served as deputy.
