= Agustín Squella =

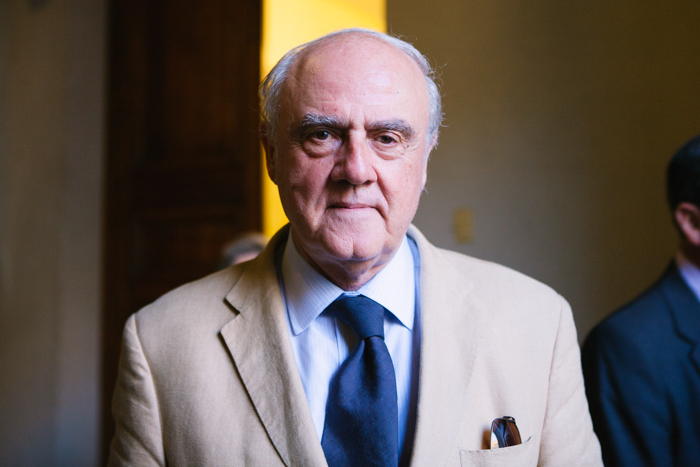

Member of the Constitutional Convention
- In office 4 July 2021 – 4 July 2022
- Constituency: 7th District

Head of the University of Valparaíso
- In office 1990–1998

Personal details
- Born: 26 April 1944 (age 82) Santiago, Chile
- Education: University of Chile (LL.B); Complutense University of Madrid (PhD)
- Occupation: Scholar
- Profession: Lawyer

Agustín Squella Narducci (born 26 April 1944) is a Chilean lawyer, legal philosopher, academic, writer, journalist, and independent politician. He served as a member of the Constitutional Convention between 2021 and 2022, representing the 7th District of the Valparaíso Region.

He was Rector of the University of Valparaíso from 1990 to 1998 and served as Presidential Advisor on Culture between 2000 and 2003 during the administration of President Ricardo Lagos. In 2009, he was awarded the National Prize for Humanities and Social Sciences of Chile.

== Early life and family ==
Squella was born on 26 April 1944 in Santiago, Chile, and has lived in the Valparaíso Region since May 1944.

He is the son of Hernán Squella Guzmán and Adelaida Narducci Pastor. He is married to Sylvia Urquiza Salgado and has three daughters.

== Scholar career ==
He completed his primary and secondary education at Colegio de los Sagrados Corazones in Viña del Mar and Colegio Seminario San Rafael in Valparaíso. He studied law at the University of Chile (Valparaíso campus) and was admitted to the bar on 23 July 1973. In 1975, he earned a PhD in Law from the Complutense University of Madrid, receiving the Prize of the Instituto de Cultura Hispánica for the best doctoral thesis of that year.

Squella has had an extensive academic career as a professor at the Faculty of Law of the University of Valparaíso, where he served two terms as rector between 1990 and 1998. He has also taught at the University of Chile, Adolfo Ibáñez University, and Diego Portales University, where he was a member of the Senior Governing Council. In addition, he served as Executive Secretary of the Television Channel of the Pontifical Catholic University of Valparaíso and, in 1999, as an associate justice of the Valparaíso Court of Appeals.

In 2000, President Ricardo Lagos appointed him Presidential Advisor on Culture, a position he held until 2003. Since 1995, he has been a full member of the Chilean Academy of Social, Political, and Moral Sciences. He has participated in multiple cultural and academic initiatives and has published numerous works on human rights and legal philosophy, as well as serving as a columnist for various Chilean media outlets.

== Political career ==
In the elections held on 15–16 May 2021, Squella ran as an independent candidate for the Constitutional Convention representing the 7th District of the Valparaíso Region, as part of La Lista del Apruebo, on a quota of the Liberal Party of Chile.

He was elected with 17,737 votes, corresponding to 5.35% of the valid votes cast.

== Awards ==
In 2009, Squella was awarded the National Prize for Humanities and Social Sciences of Chile.
