= Academy of Painting (Santiago, Chile) =

Chilean fine art school

Academy of Painting, Santiago
- Academia de Pintura

Location
- Santiago, Chile

Information
- Other names: Department of Visual Arts, Arts Faculty, University of Chile
- Former names: School of Fine Arts of Santiago, Escuela de Bellas Artes (1891–1932)
- School type: Fine art school
- Established: March 17, 1849

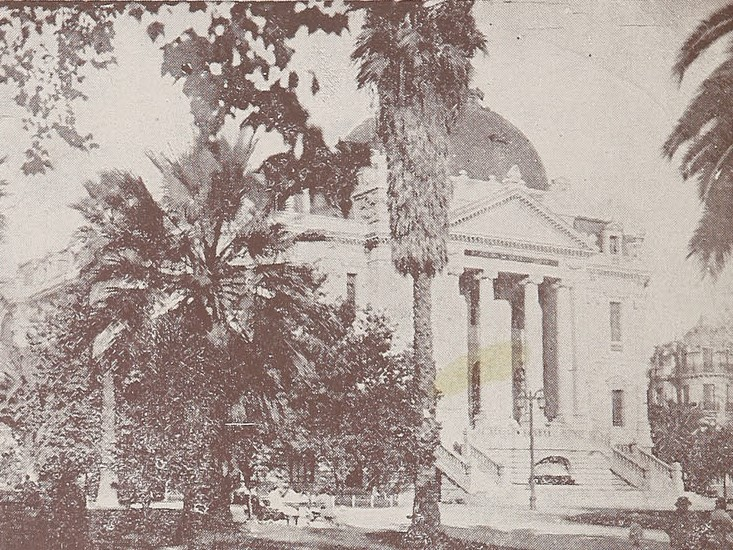
Former Parque Forestal location of the school, circa 1934. Now the location of the Santiago Museum of Contemporary Art.

Academy of Painting (Spanish: Academia de Pintura), also known as the School of Fine Arts of Santiago (Spanish: Escuela de Bellas Artes de Santiago), was a Chilean art school, founded on March 17, 1849 in Santiago, Chile. Initially located in a building of the University of San Felipe, now the site of the Municipal Theater of Santiago, it underwent relocation in 1891 and adopted the name Escuela de Bellas Artes. In 1910, the institution merged with the Museo de Bellas Artes, effectively discontinuing its operations as a separate entity. In 1932, it merged with and is now known as the Department of Visual Arts within the Arts Faculty, University of Chile.

The academy trained several early Chilean artists, including figures later recognized as the "four great masters of Chilean painting," as well as artists influenced by Pedro Lira and Antonio Smith, and those associated with the Generation of 1913. Its directors included Alejandro Ciccarelli, Ernesto Kirchbach, Juan Mochi, Cosme San Martín—the first Chilean to hold the position—and Virginio Arias.

Many of its students originated from regions outside Santiago, including Alfredo Valenzuela Puelma and Alfredo Helsby from Valparaíso, and Valenzuela Llanos from San Fernando.

== History ==
The creation of the Academy of Painting was part of the educational plan of President Manuel Bulnes. These initiatives were part of broader efforts to educate Chilean youth in diverse fields of intellectual activity, resulting in the establishment of primary schools, teacher training programs, high schools, and the University of Chile.

The promotion of various artistic disciplines continued with the founding of the School of Arts and Crafts (1849), the Conservatory of Music (1850), the introduction of architecture classes under the supervision of French architect François Brunet de Baines (1849), and the establishment of ornamentation and sculpture classes (1854) under the direction of Auguste François.

On 4 January 1849, following the end of the conflict with the Peruvian-Bolivian Confederation, the decree establishing the Academy of Painting was signed. Writers and philologists including José Victorino Lastarria, Hermógenes Irisarri, and Jacinto Chacón supported its creation. The official founding took place on 17 March 1849, under the direction of Neapolitan painter Alejandro Ciccarelli, at the facilities of the National Institute.

The academy was originally located in the building belonging to the San Felipe University, in what is today the Municipal Theatre of Santiago. Various changes led the academy to merge with the Chilean National Museum of Fine Arts (Spanish: Museo Nacional de Bellas Artes) in 1910, and then later to hand its administration over to the University of Chile in 1932.

According to Memoria Chilena:

The academy was relocated in 1891 to a new facility on Maturana Street—between Rosas and San Pablo—and renamed the "Escuela de Bellas Artes." In 1910, it was transferred once again to a new building in the Forest Park, adjacent to the newly established Museo de Bellas Artes.

In La pintura en Chile. Desde la colonia hasta 1981, authors Gaspar Galaz and Milan Ivelic note:

The founding of the Academy of Painting was an event of great importance, marking a milestone in the history of Chilean painting. Its creation allowed artistic activity to become systematic and continuous, leading to greater complexity in the study and understanding of national painting.

During this period, the academy sought a unified style in Chile, reflecting the neoclassical preferences of Ciccarelli. In Europe, academies set uniform standards and guidelines to maintain what was considered "true art." This approach was adapted to the Chilean context, drawing on French methodologies.

Initially, the academy offered three main areas of instruction: head and limb studies, whole-figure drawing, and sculpture. The final stage included working with live models, drawing clothing from life, and studying anatomy. Over time, the curriculum and teaching staff expanded to accommodate the growing student body following the academy's merger with the facilities of the National Institute.

The Academy of Painting produced some of Chile's first national artists. Despite the significance of the academy, some art historians criticized the early period (1849 to 1915) as one of the dullest in the history of Chilean art and have based their criticism on first Director Alejandro Ciccarelli's attempt to copy the European model of teaching art.

== Criticism of the academy ==
Despite the academy's significance, many art critics consider this period one of the least notable in Chilean history. In Europe, easel painting had been refined over centuries, supported by numerous masters, extensive collections, and patronage throughout the continent. By contrast, Chile was in the early stages of developing its own artistic tradition, with limited local painting and a nascent national identity. Efforts to replicate European techniques without a firmly established local context proved challenging for the academy, especially during the more than two decades of leadership by its first director, Alejandro Ciccarelli.

According to the Spanish critic Antonio Romera, Ciccarelli was:

... a dogmatic and inflexible master in defending his aesthetic ideal. He lacked the flexibility and eclecticism necessary to allow students to follow the path indicated by their own sensibility, their vocation, and their internal impulses.

The same author notes that Ciccarelli did not succeed in educating disciples who fully adhered to his methods.Instead, several advanced students, including Pedro Lira and Antonio Smith, parted ways and explored different artistic styles and workshops.

According to Pedro Lira, Ciccarelli's setbacks were largely due to the limited artistic knowledge among Chilean aristocracy in the mid-19th century, with few points of reference beyond the "precursors of Chilean painting." This environment made significant educational progress difficult and challenged the Italian's neoclassical approach. While his rigid methods drew criticism from several students, they also introduced a neoclassical tradition in Chilean painting.

== Notable people ==
It would be the starting point for some of the most prominent Chilean painters, including the four great masters of Chilean painting, Pedro Lira, Juan Francisco González, Alfredo Valenzuela Puelma, and Alberto Valenzuela Llanos; their pupils; and also the future "Generación del 13" (13 Generation) painting collective. Notable academy students included Antonio Smith, Elisa Berroeta, Cosme San Martín, Onofre Jarpa, and Manuel Antonio Caro.

=== Directors ===
The academy's early Directors were Europeans, the Neapolitan artist Alejandro Ciccarelli; the German artist Ernst Kirchbach; and the Florentine Giovanni "Juan" Mochi. The first Chilean to hold the Director position was Cosme San Martín.

- Alejandro Ciccarelli (1849 to 1869)
- Ernst Kirchbach (1869 to 1875)
- Juan Mochi (1876 to 1881)
- Cosme San Martin (1881 to 1893)
- Pedro Lira (1893 to 1900)
- Virginio Arias (1900 to 1911)
- Fernando Alvarez de Sotomayor (1911 to 1915)

== Students of Ciccarelli (1849–1869) ==
Ciccarelli's neoclassical style introduced themes previously unseen in Chile, including mythological motifs and scenes referencing ancient classical cultures.

Despite receiving instruction at the academy, many students—particularly those who achieved prominence, such as Pedro Lira and Antonio Smith—resisted Cicarelli’s teaching methods. Nevertheless, the following figures stand out among those who passed through his workshop:

- Pedro Lira, described by Ricardo Bindis in Chilean Painting 200 Years as the “natural leader” of the Academy. He is often cited as the foremost of the “four great masters” of Chilean painting. Historians, including Antonio Romera, identify him as part of the “Generation of the Mid-Century.”
- Antonio Smith, a Romantic painter recognized for establishing Chile’s national landscape school. He is also regarded as Chile’s first caricaturist and worked for Correo Literario.
- Manuel Antonio Caro, a historical costumbrist painter considered one of the early figures in Chilean painting. Among his works are La Abdicación de O’Higgins and La Zamacueca.
- Pascual Ortega, a painter known for his genre and religious subjects. His style shares notable similarities with Cicarelli’s.
- Onofre Jarpa, a Romantic painter noted for his landscape works and also served as a diplomat.
- Cosme San Martín, a notable painter who later became the first Chilean to serve as director of the Academy.
- Abraham Zañartu, a painter primarily devoted to genre scenes and oil portraits.
- Miguel Campos, a prominent student of the Academy who distinguished himself as a draftsman in Paris.

Other students included Luciano Lainez, Manuel Mena, José Castañeda, Nicolás Guzmán, Albina Elguín, and Clarisa Donoso Bascuñán. In 1866, Agustina Gutiérrez enrolled, becoming the institution’s first recorded female student.

After several years, the Neapolitan master shifted his approach, “either due to pressure from some of his disciples or as the result of personal development,” incorporating elements of landscape painting into his work.

Antonio Smith was a strong critic of his instructor. In Correo Literario, he wrote:

Arrives in these beautiful regions

A painter who was a portent: he showed plaques, distinctions and medals for drawers...

But he did not show talent

Chilean artistic rebellion emerged during this director’s tenure, although its impact would not become evident until several decades later.

In 1859, by supreme decree, the Academy was granted the status of an institution of higher education and was renamed the University Section of Fine Arts, integrating the architecture and sculpture classes that had previously been taught separately. This decree also merged the Academy with facilities of the National Institute, a significant development as many students were simultaneously enrolled in both institutions.

In the same year, under the administration of President Manuel Montt, a new decree reorganized the Sculpture division, dividing it into statuary and monumental sculpture. After two decades as director, the Italian resigned in 1869 and was succeeded by the German artist Ernesto Kirchbach.

== Students of Ernesto Kirchbach (1869–1875) ==
Ernesto Sigismund Kirchbach was a German painter born in Dresden in 1832 and died there in 1880. He began working in Chile at age 37, introducing a strict academic approach and promoting Romanticism among his students.

According to Ivelic and Galaz:

The new director operated within a limited thematic range, his primary innovation being an interest in medieval historical subjects. His technique remained within the academic tradition, strictly adhering to thematic description.

According to Pedro Lira, Kirchbach showed signs of eccentricity and nervous outbursts, making his classes unpopular among students. Nonetheless, they acknowledged his talent for painting.

Among Kirchbach’s notable students were:

- Pedro Lira: A prominent Chilean painter who also studied under Cicarelli. Cosme San Martín: A painter who later became director of the Academy; he, too, was a former student of Cicarelli.
- Alberto Orrego Luco: A Chilean landscape painter who has been identified by Ricardo Bindis as one of “the greatest Chilean painters of the 19th century.”
- Alfredo Valenzuela Puelma: One of the four “great masters” of Chilean painting, known for introducing the trend of painting nudes in Chile.
- Onofre Jarpa: A Romantic landscape painter and former student of Cicarelli. Pedro León Carmona: Regarded by Kirchbach as one of his most accomplished students. Carmona later founded both the Academia de Pintura del Círculo Católico and the Academia de Pintura de la Pontificia Universidad Católica de Chile.

== Students of Juan Mochi (1876-1883) ==
The third director of the academy was the Florentine painter Giovanni Mochi Pinx, known in Chile as Juan Mochi. He was the first to cultivate direct disciples, owing to his more innovative teaching method that emphasized guiding and encouraging students’ inherent abilities, rather than adhering strictly to the academic constraints of previous years.

Mochi was the first director to earn consistent appreciation from his students, many of whom developed distinctive personal styles under his instruction. Because his tenure overlapped with the War of the Pacific, numerous works he produced relate to that conflict.

Mochi’s innovative approach is also reflected in his own body of work. Although initially associated with Romanticism, he adopted a more realist style after arriving in Chile. Critics such as Ivelic and Galaz compare his costumbrista pieces to those of Manuel Antonio Caro, Mauricio Rugendas, and Ernesto Charton de Treville. As director, he encouraged students to experiment beyond traditional academic conventions, integrating elements of local (Creole) painting with European influences.

Several significant figures in Chilean fine arts studied under his guidance, including three of the four traditional “great masters” of Chilean painting.

- Alfredo Valenzuela Puelma: An academic painter known for his portraits and depictions rooted in a strict natural representation of the subject. He is recognized as one of Chile’s four great masters of painting and also studied under Kirchbach.
- Alberto Valenzuela Llanos: A landscape painter counted among the four great masters of Chilean painting, widely considered by some authors to be Chile’s most internationally awarded artist. His honors include the Knight’s Cross of the French Legion of Honor.
- Juan Francisco González: A painter sometimes described as an Impressionist. His work and role as a teacher influenced movements such as the Generation of 1913 and the Montparnasse Group.

He also taught Ernesto Molina, Nicanor González Méndez, Abraham Zañartu, and the sisters Aurora Mira and Magdalena Mira, as well as Celia Castro, considered Chile’s first professional woman painter.

During Mochi’s tenure, many established Chilean artists practiced independently. Figures such as Pedro Lira and his associates, Antonio Smith with his landscape focus, Alberto Orrego Luco, Juan Francisco González, Thomas Somerscales, and his student Casanova Zenteno demonstrated that artistic development was not limited to Academy instruction. Their approach took shape under the influence of Spanish painter Fernando Álvarez de Sotomayor, who provided the final impetus for what became the Generation of 1913—considered a formative stage in the emergence of a distinctly Chilean art.

Sources offer inconsistent information about the events following Mochi’s tenure, with essential dates varying across different accounts. It is known, however, that Cosme San Martín served as interim director, becoming the first Chilean to hold that position. Before assuming this role, he had already taught several notable artists, including Enrique Lynch, Pablo Burchard, Marcial Plaza Ferrand, and Arturo Gordon.

In 1891, the academy was renamed the School of Fine Arts and relocated to Matucana Street.

== Virginio Arias (1900-1911) ==
After a period marked by low enrollment and diminished activity, Virginio Arias assumed the directorship of the School of Fine Arts. The renowned Chilean sculptor successfully recruited qualified instructors and actively supported students in completing their training. One of his most notable hires was the Spanish painter Fernando Álvarez de Sotomayor, who introduced elements of Goya-influenced painting into Chilean art.

In 1908, the School became part of the Universidad de Chile. In 1910, it underwent a final major transition, relocating its facilities to the recently established National Museum of Fine Arts.

== Álvarez de Sotomayor (1911-1915) ==
In 1911, following the departure of Virginio Arias, Fernando Álvarez de Sotomayor assumed leadership of the School of Fine Arts. He had arrived in Chile a few years prior, initially hired by the government as a professor of color theory.

Sotomayor made it his goal to reintroduce Iberian heritage to his students, including those from the Generation of 13, by demoting himself and returning to Spain.

Álvarez de Sotomayor introduced Iberian influences to his students, including members of the Generation of 13. After the group's official formation, he stepped back from his role in Chile and returned to Spain, where he later served as director of the Prado Museum and the San Fernando Academy.

For the art critic Luis Álvarez Urquieta:

Alvarez de Sotomayor's time at our school could not have been more fruitful; he reformed its regulations, almost doubled the number of students and trained numerous disciples who were a hope for the future of our art.

== Legacy ==
Over time, Chilean painting underwent significant transformations. It shifted away from its pre-Hispanic roots, where it served as a form of indigenous art, and from its colonial function, when it was used to instruct and unify social classes. It also moved beyond the dispersed stylistic approaches that characterized the early “precursors” of national painting.

During this period, access to the academy—and to painting and sculpture in general—became largely confined to Chile’s wealthier social classes. Many works created at that time drew heavily on European masters, limiting the development of a distinctly Chilean style.

Although the Academy’s early years were marked by various limitations, they also reflected Chile’s emerging commitment to advancing artistic standards. Furthermore, the institution served as a launching point for several independent painters who, discontented with its rigid methods, sought out new techniques and directions.

The Academia–Escuela de Bellas Artes enrolled students who played a significant role in Chilean painting, including members of the Generation of 1913 and several notable artists. Although most works produced at the institution are now privately owned, a number of oil paintings and sculptures remain in Chilean museums and other public venues.

== See also ==
- Chilean art
- National Museum of Fine Arts
- Arts Faculty, University of Chile
