= Antonio Smith (artist) =

Chilean painter, engraver, caricaturist and teacher

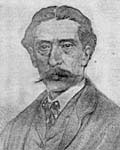
- Born: Miguel Antonio Smith Irisarri; 29 September 1832; Santiago, Chile
- Died: 24 May 1877 (aged 44); Santiago, Chile
- Education: Academy of Painting (didn't graduate)
- Occupations: Painter, printmaker, educator
- Relatives: Hermógenes Irisarri (uncle); Antonio José de Irisarri (grandfather)
- Family: Larraín family

Miguel Antonio Smith Irisarri (29 September 1832 – 24 May 1877) was a Chilean landscape painter, engraver, caricaturist and art teacher.

== Biography ==
Smith was born on 29 September 1832 in Santiago to Jorge Smith, the British Consul to Chile, and Carmen Irisarri Trucíos, a member of the Los Ochocientos branch of the Larraín family. Through his mother, Smith was the nephew of Hermógenes Irisarri, a poet, journalist, editor and diplomat, and the grandson of Antonio José de Irisarri, a Guatemalan writer, statesman, journalist and politician.

His family wanted him to be a lawyer. With his own money, he purchased brushes and paints, but they were thrown away.

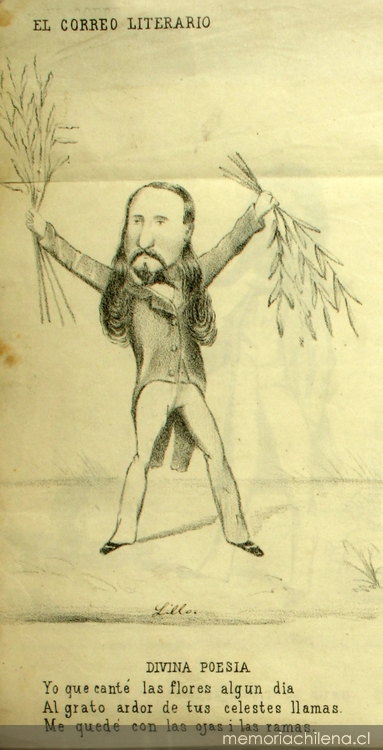
Eusebio Lillo, author of the Chilean National Anthem

He continued to insist so vehemently that, in 1849, his family gave in and allowed him to study at the new Academy of Painting (Santiago, Chile), founded by President Manuel Bulnes. His first teacher there was the Director, an Italian-born artist named Alejandro Ciccarelli, who worked to instil the Academic style in his students. Smith wanted to paint landscapes instead of mythological subjects, but Ciccarelli was adamant in his opposition. In 1851, thoroughly frustrated, Smith left the school to paint on his own.

A year later, unsuccessful, he enlisted in a squadron of mounted grenadiers. He was stationed in Chillán, where he got married and abandoned his military career at the end of his five-year enlistment. On his return to Santiago, he became an employee of a savings bank managed by a former classmate of his, José Arrieta, who would later become a well-known diplomat.

After only a year, he quit and became an illustrator for the political daily El Correo Literario, which was critical of the Conservative Republic. Although handicapped by old, malfunctioning equipment and a dearth of decent supplies, he created a huge number of portrait caricatures of notable people (including his old nemesis, Ciccarelli), with humorous captions or poems by Guillermo Matta. As might be expected, there was much official opposition. President Manuel Montt called on them to stop publishing "esos monos groseros" (those crude monkeys). After less than a year of operation, they had to close up shop, at least temporarily.

=== Time abroad ===
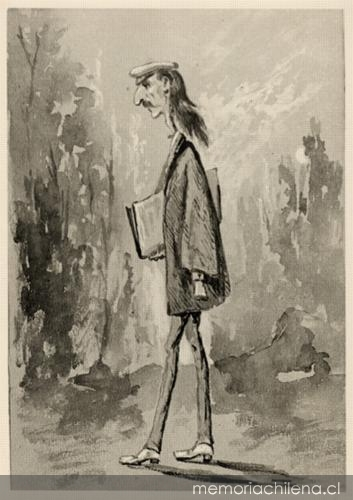
Self-portrait

The failure of the Revolution of 1859 forced him to emigrate. He decided to go to France and, after a short time, became reasonably successful. However, the Bohemian lifestyle he had adopted caused him to squander his money, so he had to go to the United States to seek financial assistance from his grandfather, Antonio José, who at that time was a diplomat in New York. He then went to Italy, where he spent a year working with the landscape painter Carlo Marco. After that, he decided to return to Chile, despite the dangers involved in sea travel during the Chincha Islands War.

In 1866, following a difficult six-month voyage, he landed at San Antonio and joined a group of firefighters from Santiago, although he did not remain with them for long. Serious cultural reforms were sweeping the country, but he was amazed to see how little had changed at the Academy. That is, Ciccarelli was still in charge, so Smith established his own teaching workshop. In 1869, Ciccarelli was replaced by Ernst Kirchbach, a German painter who was more amenable to Smith, and they began sharing students. Some of his best-known students include Alfredo Valenzuela Puelma, Pedro Lira, Alberto Orrego Luco, Onofre Jarpa and Cosme San Martín.

Although an excellent teacher, he was very disorganized, painting when the mood struck him. As a result, many of his works were done quickly or left unfinished. His many imitators often make it difficult to assign authorship with certainty. The majority of his paintings are in private collections.

== Landscapes ==
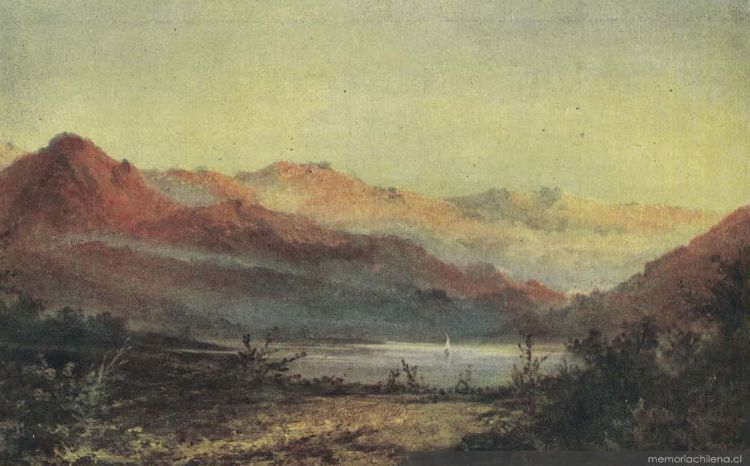
Cordillera and Lake

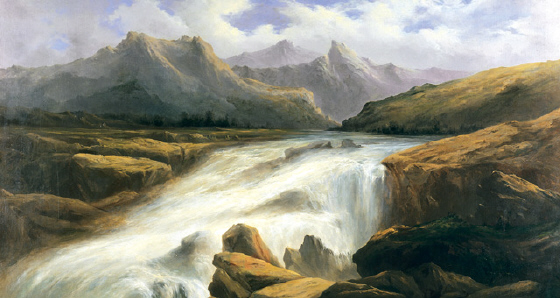
Cachapoal River

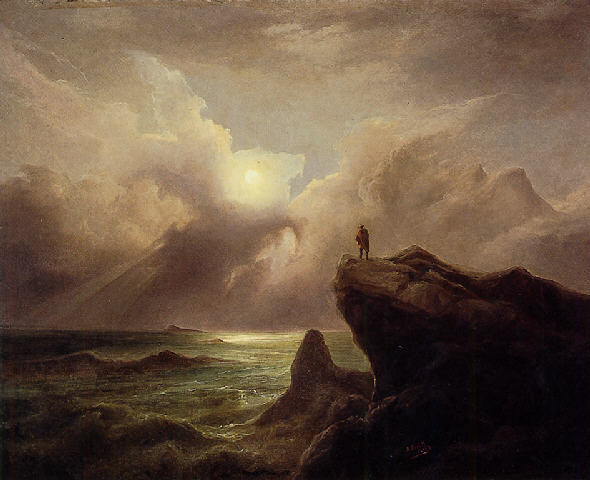
Twilight on the Shore
