= Pablo Burchard =

Chilean painter and professor (1875–1964)

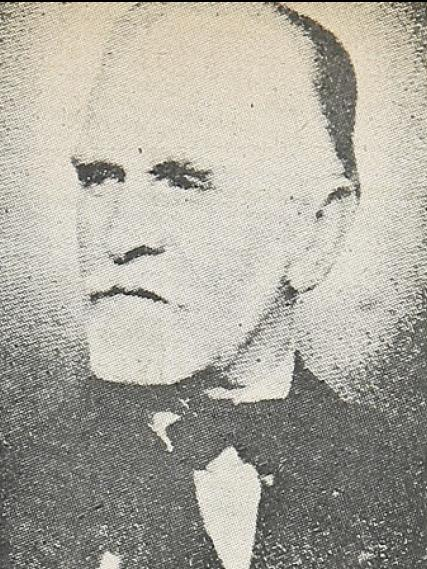
- Burchard in 1941
- Born: Pedro Pablo Burchard Eggeling; 4 November 1875; Santiago, Chile
- Died: 13 July 1964 (aged 88); Santiago, Chile
- Education: University of Chile; Academy of Painting
- Occupations: Painter; professor
- Spouse: Julia Aguayo Trujillo (m. 1917)
- Awards: National Prize of Art of Chile, 1944

Academic work
- Institutions: Arts Faculty, University of Chile
- Notable students: See list: Herminia Arrate, Ximena Cristi; Irene Domínguez; Sergio Montecino; Carlos Pedraza Olguín; Aída Poblete; Inés Puyó; Reinaldo Villaseñor

Pedro Pablo Burchard Eggeling (November 4, 1875 – July 13, 1964) was a Chilean painter and professor at the Arts Faculty of the University of Chile. Awarded the inaugural National Prize of Art of Chile in 1944, Buchard's paintings focused on nature, the essence of painting and the representation of the everyday and simple objects.

== Early life and education ==
Burchard was born on 4 November 1875 in Santiago to Teodoro Burchard, a German architect, and María Luisa Eggeling Metzger. Burchard was one of fifteen children.

Initially studying architecture at the University of Chile, Burchard later studied at the Academy of Painting under Cosme San Martín, Pedro Lira and Fernando Álvarez de Sotomayor y Zaragoza.

== Career ==
In 1903, Burchard worked as a teacher at secondary school in Talca and later taught drawing at the Girls' High School No. 6 in Santiago.

During 1904 to 1905, Burchard frequented the Tolstoyan Colony (Spanish: Colonia Tolstoyana). Although a contemporary of the Generación del 13, Burchard's work differed in both inspiration and aesthetic. Burchard's work focused on nature, the essence of painting and on the representation of everyday and simple objects.

In 1931, Burchard was appointed the administrator of the re-opened Arts Faculty of the University of Chile. Burchard served as the facilities director from 1932 to 1935, and as a professor of painting and landscape until 1959. Burchard was notably the teacher of Herminia Arrate, Ximena Cristi, Irene Domínguez, Sergio Montecino, Carlos Pedraza Olguín, Aída Poblete, Inés Puyó and Reinaldo Villaseñor.

In 1944, Burchard was awarded the inaugural National Prize of Art of Chile.

== Personal life ==
On 3 May 1917, Burchard married Julia Aguayo Trujillo. Burchard and Aguayo had three children including Pablo Burchard Aguayo, a painter, and Cuca Burchard, a painter and potter.

An active Freemason, Burchard left the organization in 1948 following a conversion to Christianity.

On 13 July 1964 Burchard died in Santiago, aged 88.
