= Luis Fernando Rojas =

Chilean illustrator, lithographer and caricaturist

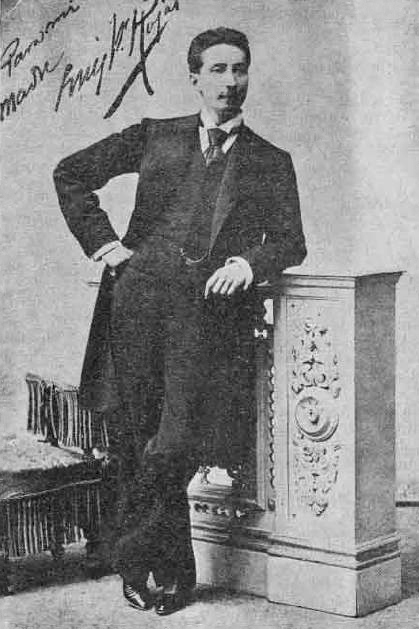
- Luis Fernando Rojas c. 1911
- Born: Luis Fernando Rojas Chaparro; 1857; Casablanca, Chile
- Died: 6 July 1942 (aged 84–85); Santiago, Chile
- Education: Academy of Painting (Santiago, Chile)
- Known for: illustrations and cartoons

Luis Fernando Rojas Chaparro (1857 – 6 July 1942) was a Chilean illustrator, lithographer and caricaturist.

== Biography ==
He was born to a humble family and attended the local schools. Later, he and his mother moved to Santiago, where he enrolled at the Instituto Nacional and studied drawing with Ernesto Kirchbach. After three years, due to his exceptional talent, he was admitted to the Academy of Painting (Santiago, Chile) in 1874, aged only seventeen. He was there for less than two years, however, when he came into serious disagreement with the new Director, Juan Mochi, and left the school to continue his studies on his own.

He managed to earn a decent living doing commissioned portraits, but soon decided that he would need to expand his technical knowledge to be truly successful. In pursuit of this goal, he took lessons in lithography. Soon after, he began doing illustrations.

In a short time, he would become a major contributor to the Chilean press. His clients included dailies and weeklies, such as La Época, and El Nuevo Ferrocarril, as well as the magazines, El Taller Ilustrado and Zig-Zag. He also collaborated with the writer, Juan Rafael Allende, on works for several satirical publications, including El Padre Cobos. For this type of work, he often signed his drawings with the pseudonym, "Marius".

A large part of his output consisted of illustrating historical episodes, naval combat, and famous battles. His portraits of national heroes drew particular attention, and have long been sought by historians for use in their works. They appeared in the Álbum de la gloria de Chile, by Benjamín Vicuña Mackenna, as well as in some works by Diego Barros Arana, and articles by José Toribio Medina in the Diccionario Biográfico Colonial de Chile.

It is believed that a large number of his works were published anonymously, and little is known about his life after his early years. The last detailed review of his career was written in 1911. Rojas would die in obscurity in 1942. It was only in 1994 that the Biblioteca Nacional presented a retrospective exhibition devoted exclusively to him.

== Selected works ==
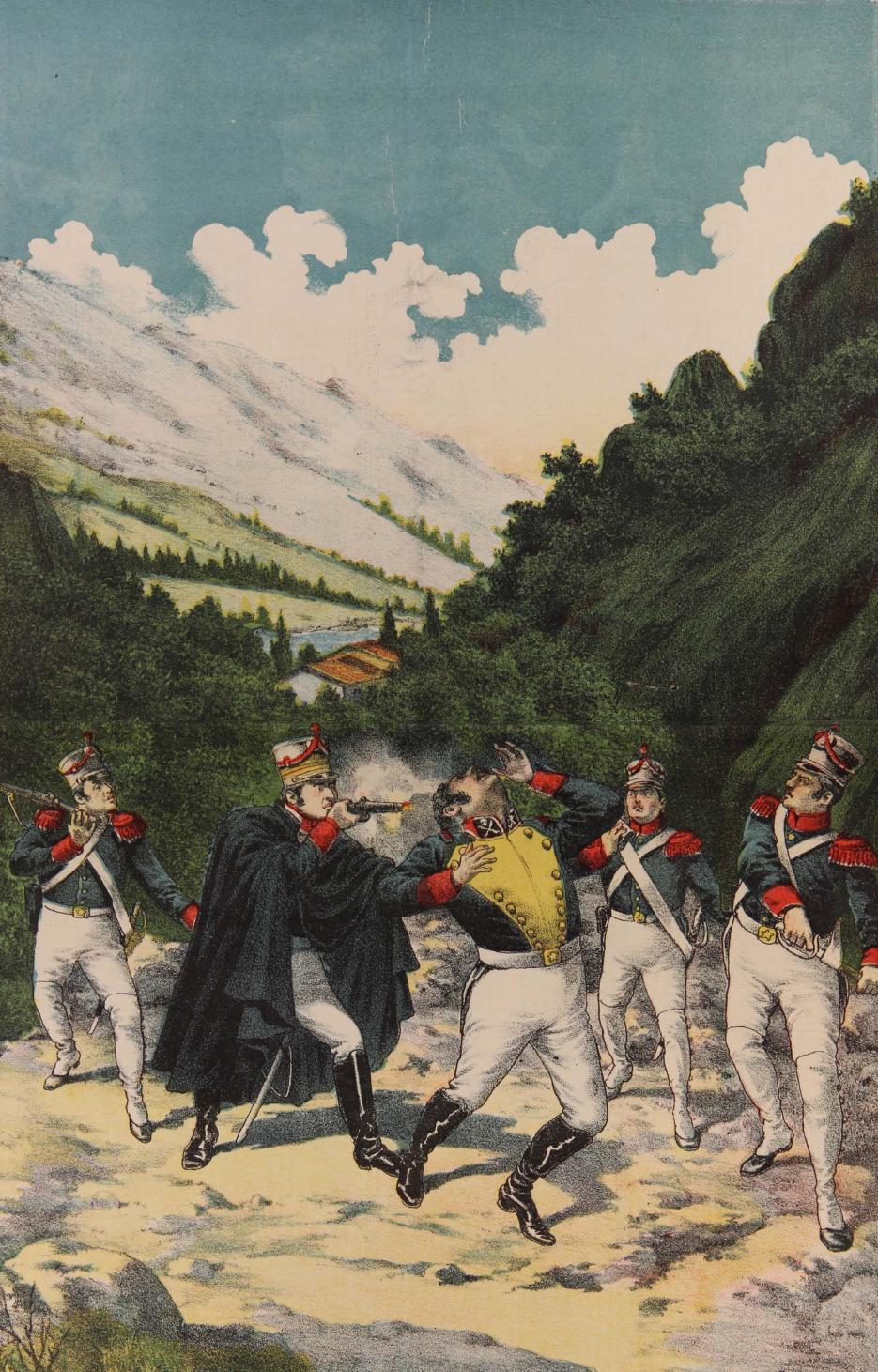
Assassination of Manuel Rodríguez

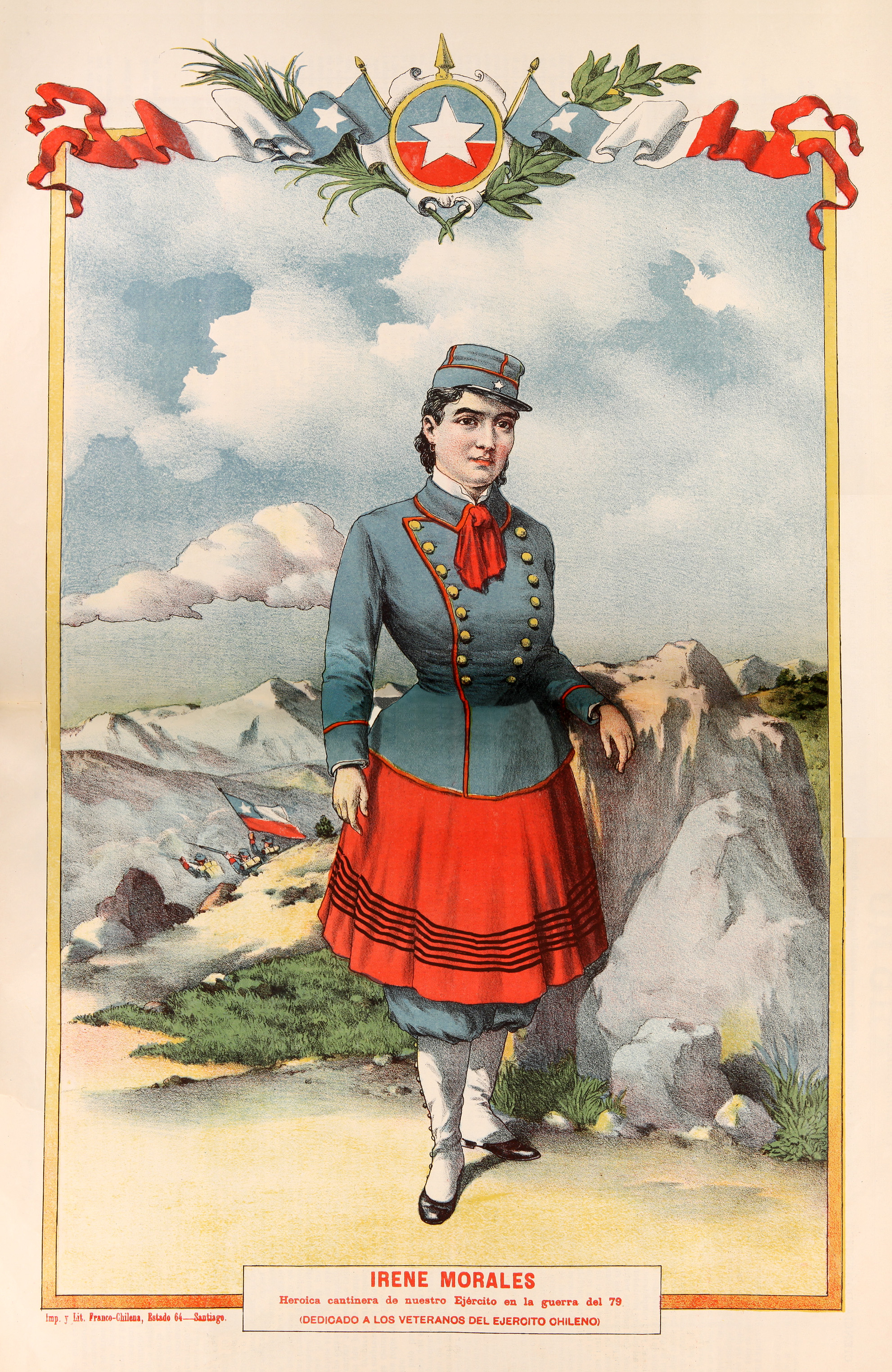
Homage to
Irene Morales

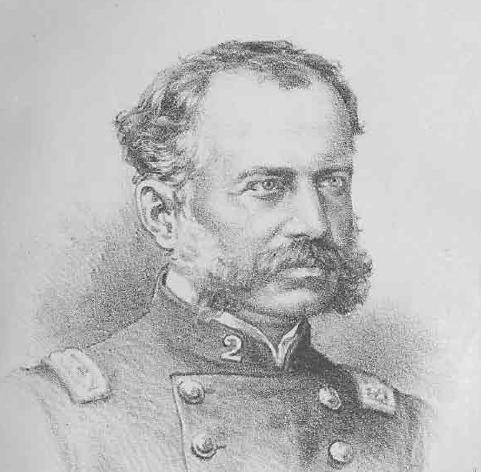
Eleuterio Ramírez

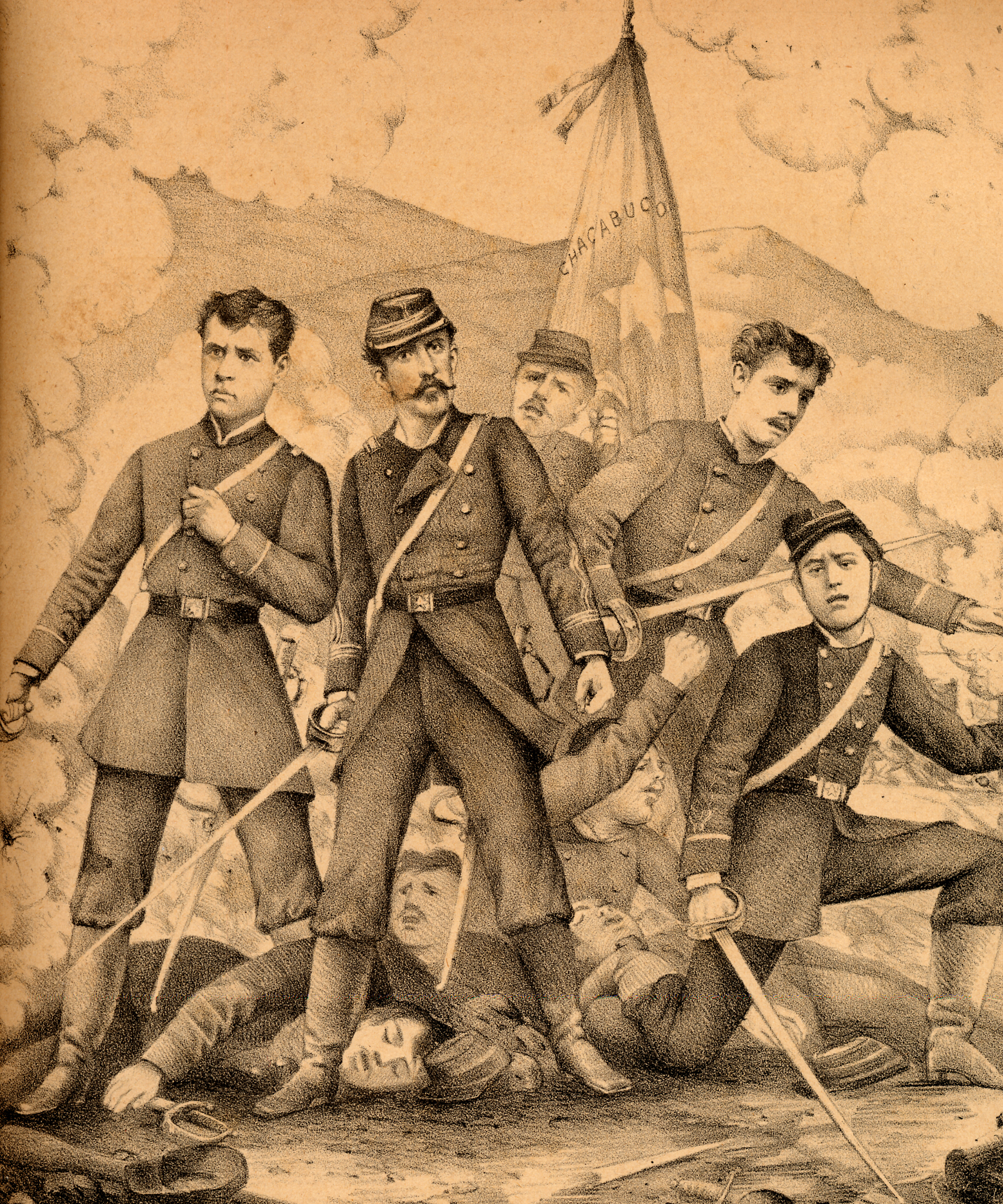
Ignacio Carrera Pinto
(Battle of La Concepción)

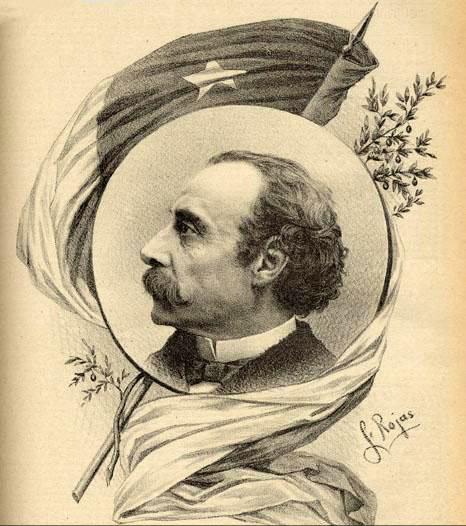
José Manuel Balmaceda

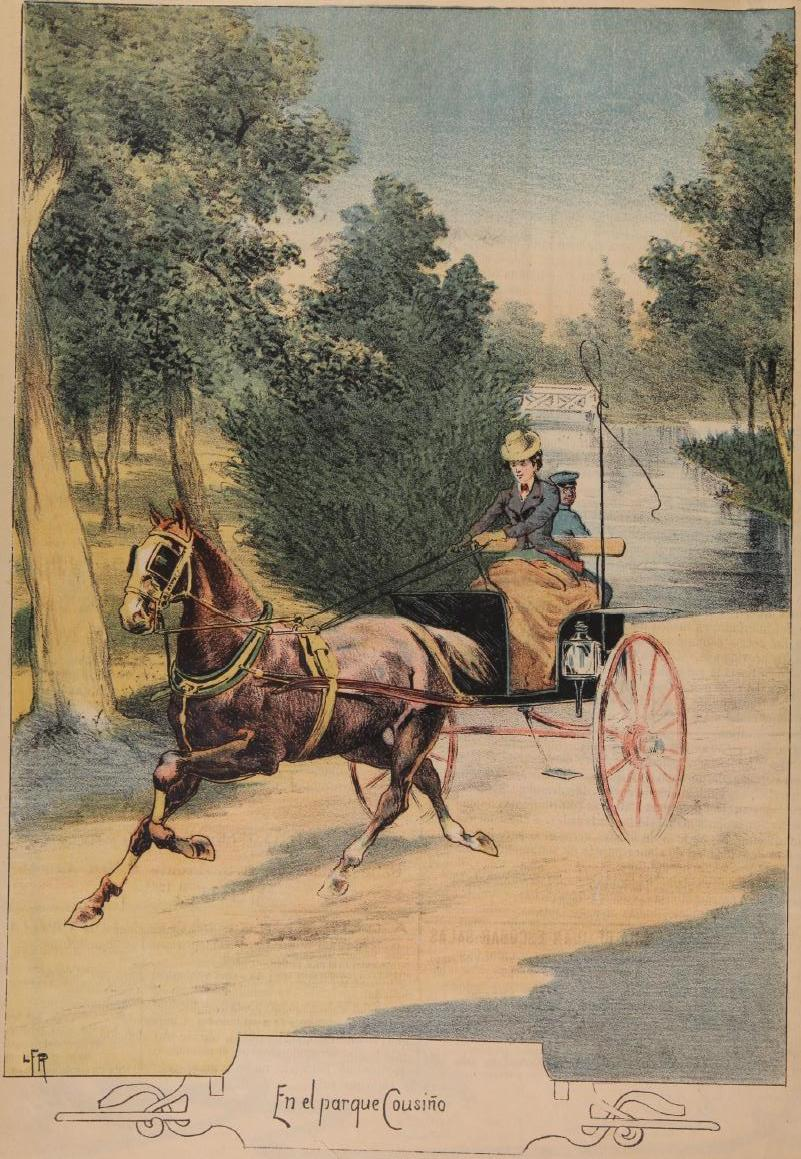
In O'Higgins Park

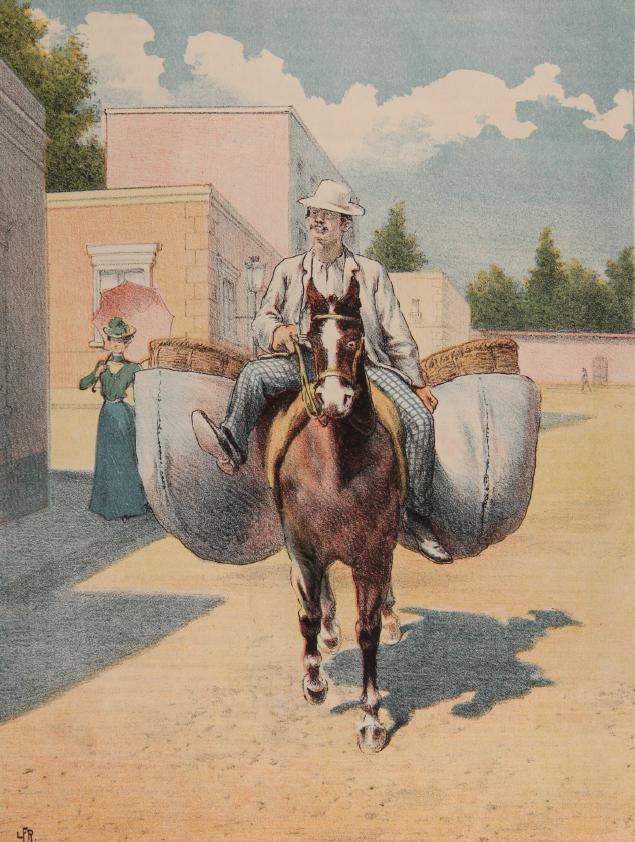
Fig Seller

== Sources ==
- "Luis Fernando Rojas: Ilustrador Ilustre de Chile" by Paz Vásquez, Revista Patrimonio Cultural #59, 2014 pp.34–43
- "Un ilustrador de la sociedad chilena" (biography) @ Memoria Chilena
- Brief biography from Artistas Visuales Chilenos @ the Chilean National Museum of Fine Arts
