= Iglesia del Dulce Nombre de María (Santiago de Chile) =

Catholic church in Santiago, Chile

Coordinates: 33.4457°S 70.6424°W

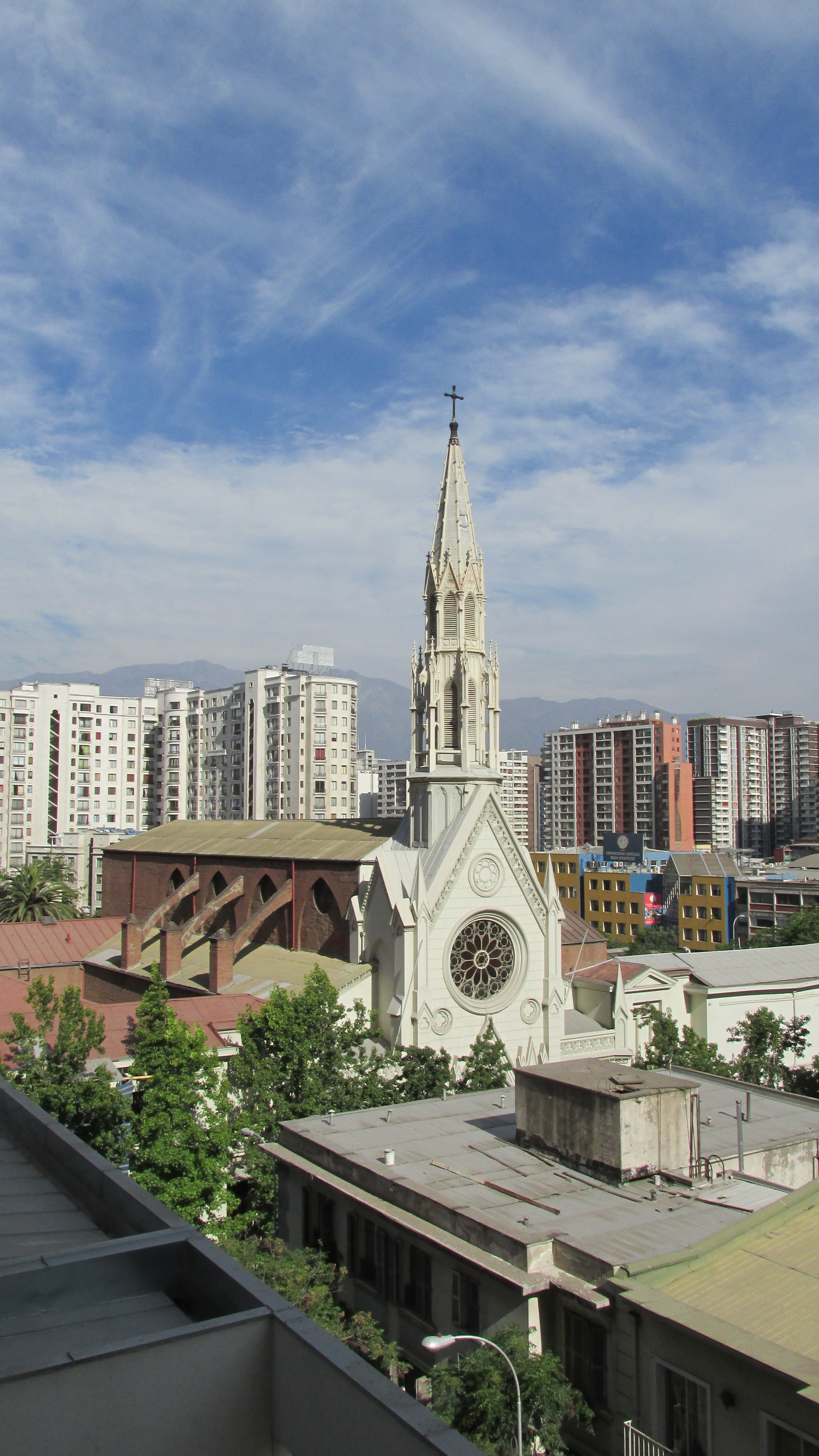

Religion
- Affiliation: Catholic Church

Location
- Municipality: Santiago
- Country: Chile
- Interactive map of Iglesia del Dulce Nombre de María

Architecture
- Architect: Teodoro Burchard
- Style: Neo Gothic
- Groundbreaking: 1878
- Completed: 1879

The Iglesia del Dulce Nombre de María is a Catholic Church located at the intersection of Carmen Street and Curicó Street, in downtown Santiago, Chile.

== History ==
In 1856, the presbyter Blas Cañas founded the first religious congregation of Chile, the House of the Holy Mary, whose purpose was to provide refuge for young girls. The congregation was established on land donated by painter Alejandro Cicarelli.

The construction of the church and annex buildings began in 1878 following the design of architect Teodoro Burchard. The church complex included an orphanage for girls, a convent, and a school.

Earthquakes in 1985 and 2010 damaged the church building, after which it was closed for a year for renovation.

== Description ==
The church is built of brick. Columns and pointed arches divide the nave from the side aisles. The south aisle contains a longer chapel.

The church has a timber roof truss. The center tower and the rib vaulted ceiling are also made from wood.

== Bibliography ==
- Pallarés Torres, Mirtha (2018). Templos católicos neogóticos. Santiago 1850-1950. Santiago: Editorial Universitaria. ISBN 9789561125957.
