= Elisa Berroeta =

Chilean engraver, artist

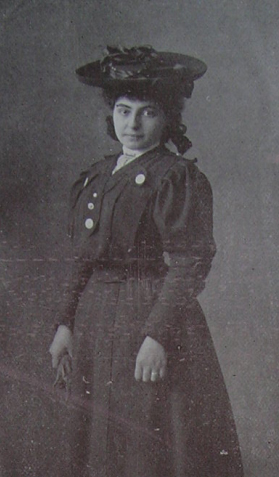
- Born: Elisa Berroeta–Araya; Ovalle, Coquimbo, Chile
- Occupations: Engraver, illustrator, visual artist
- Years active: 1904–1912

Elisa Berroeta Araya was a Chilean 20th-century engraver, illustrator, and visual artist. She is known as one of the first female artists awarded scholarships by the Chilean government for studies in Europe.

== Biography ==
Elisa Berroeta–Araya was born in the late 19th century in Ovalle, in Coquimbo, Chile. She studied engraving at the Academy of Painting in Santiago (formerly Escuela de Bellas Artes de Santiago) under French artist León Bazin.

In 1905, Berroeta obtained a scholarship granted by the Chilean government to continue her artistic studies in Paris, where she lived and worked for three years. The same year, the Chilean magazine Zig Zag named Berroeta "a national artist (of Chile)" for her representation of her country abroad. From roughly the 1880s to 1920s, it was common for wood engravings to be used for fine-art reproduction and for illustration. In France she created many wood engraving reproductions of French art, some of which were published in the Chilean magazine Selecta.

Berroeta participated in the annual salon Exhibition of Fine Arts, Santiago (Spanish: Exposiciones de Bellas Artes, Santiago) in 1904, 1906, and 1907. In 1904, she was awarded a third-prize medal for her two engravings at the Exhibition of Fine Arts, Santiago.
