= South American Continental Exhibition =

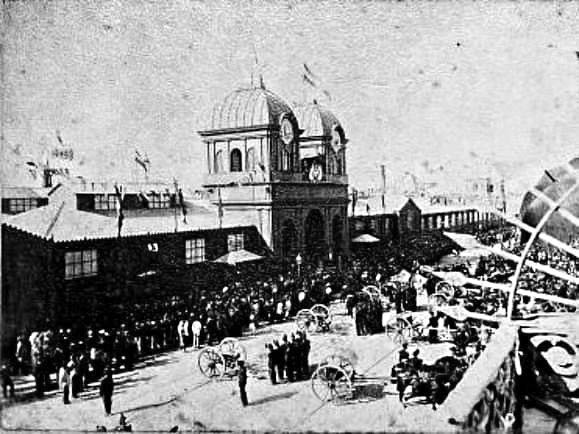

Overview
- BIE-class: Unrecognized exposition
- Name: South American Continental Exhibition
- Visitors: 50,000
- Organized by: Industrial Club of Buenos Aires

Location
- Country: Argentina
- City: Buenos Aires
- Venue: Plaza Once
- Coordinates: 34°36′35″S 58°24′26.8″W

Timeline
- Opening: 14 March 1882
- Closure: 31 July 1882

expositions
- Previous: Melbourne International Exhibition (1880) in Melbourne
- Next: 1888 Barcelona Universal Exposition in Barcelona

Simultaneous
- Other: Exposition internationale des vins, Bordeaux, France

The South American Continental Exhibition (Exposición Continental Sud-Americana) was held in Buenos Aires from 14 March to 31 July 1882.

== Organisation ==
The fair was organised by the Industrial Club of Buenos Aires who had organised an industrial exhibition in Buenos Aires in 1877. Julio A Roca (president) inaugurated the exhibition with the honorary chair of the committee Nicolás Avellaneda stating that the exhibition represented industrial progress.

Congress gave funds for the exhibition which were used for premises in Plaza Once.

== Exhibits and prizes ==
Exhibits covered: arts; beer, cigarettes and wine; clothing and footwear; and soap from Argentina and other countries in America and Europe.

Nations exhibiting at the exhibition included Argentina, Bolivia, Brazil, Chile, Cuba, Ecuador, France, Germany, Great Britain, Mexico, Paraguay, Switzerland, United States of America, Uruguay, and Venezuela.

Prize winners included the Brazilian photographers Marc Ferrez, Insley Pacheco. and the Brazilian 'Esberard Glass and Crystal' company.

Pascual Ortega Portales from Chile received the second prize for paintings.

== Historical show ==
A historical show was announced on the 15 March 1882. This was to cover the history of the River Plate with sections including "Argentinian prehistorical", "Columbian era", numismatics, paintings, prints, manuscripts, maps (including nautical maps) and furniture.

The tone of the exhibition was debated with Estanislao Zeballos of the exhibition organising committee arguing that war trophies that could embarrass potentially participating nations (Brazil and Paraguay) be excluded.

== Closure ==
By the time it closed at the end of July 50,000 people had visited.
