= Pascual Ortega Portales =

Chilean painter (1839–1899)

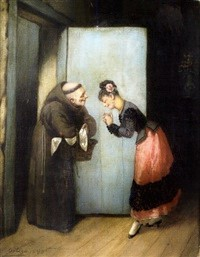
- The visit
- Born: Pascual Ortega Portales; December 5, 1839; Santiago, Chile
- Died: December 22, 1899 (aged 60); Santiago, Chile
- Known for: Painter
- Notable work: Neapolitan; La Alsaciana; Child portrait
- Movement: Romanticism, realism
- Awards: Second Medal, Continental Exhibition of Buenos Aires, Argentina
- Patrons: Government of Chile

Pascual Ortega Portales (December 5, 1839 – December 22, 1899) was a notable Chilean painter. His art fits into the categories of romanticism and realism.

== Biography ==
Ortega Portales was born in a wealthy family. At 14 years old he was sent to Europe to study art. Studied there from 1854 to 1864 at the Academy of Painting (Santiago, Chile) with Alejandro Ciccarelli. In 1868 he received a scholarship from the Chilean government for a stay in Europe and studied at the École des Beaux-Arts in Paris with Alexandre Cabanel and Hippolyte Taine. During this time Ortega Portales also visited Italy, Spain, Belgium and Germany.
After a ten-years sojourn in Europe he settled in Santiago of Chile, where he painted portraits and Italian scene from memory. Intessive training permitted him resolve any genre with Jean-Claude Nicolas Forestier in perspective allowed him to experiment in monumental compositions. His solid academic training of painting, but he was unfamiliar with the refinement of the European masters who were the model of reference for figurative painting. The rigidity of his characters and strident colors were criticized by his contemporaries and prevented him from joining the faculty al the School of Fine Arts. His paintings have been exhibited in Chile, Argentina and France, among others.

In the 1882 South American Continental Exhibition in Buenos Aires, he received the second prize. Several of his works are in the collection of the National Museum of Fine Arts.

== Works in public collections ==
=== Works in the National Museum of Fine Art Collection ===
- Neapolitan, oil on canvas, 36 x 27 cm.
- La Alsaciana, 1874, oil on canvas, 55 x 39 cm.
- Child portrait, oil on canvas, 47 x 33 cm.

=== Works in other public collections ===
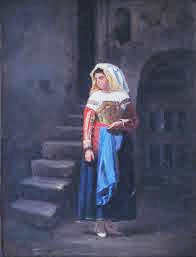
Napolitana

- Berlin Museum, Berlin, Germany
- Santiago Cathedral, Santiago, Chile
- Church of San Isidro, Santiago of Chile
- School Concepción workshop, Concepción, Chile
- Craftsman society, La Unión, Santiago, Chile

== Exhibitions ==
=== Collective exhibitions ===
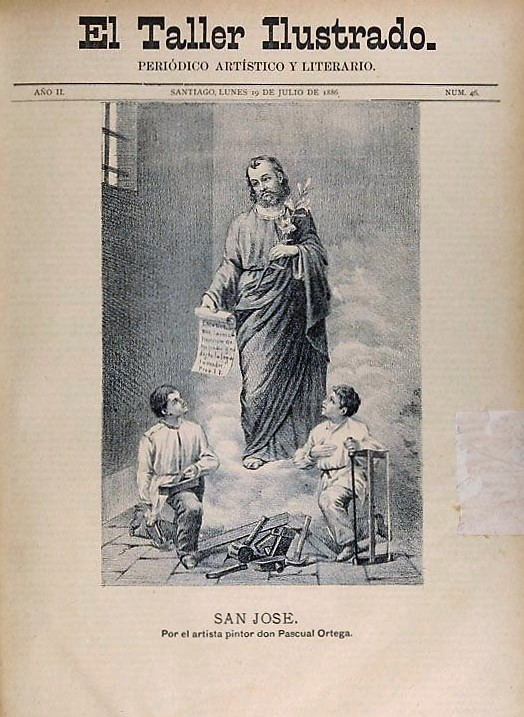
Illustrated workshop N°46, oil on canvas of Saint Joseph

- 1869 Salon of Paris, France.
- 1877 Official Hall, Santiago.
- 1882 South American Continental Exhibition, Buenos Aires.
- 1884 Official Hall, Santiago.
- 1896 Official Hall, Santiago. He also participated in 1925.
- 1889 Beaux Arts au Chili, Exposition Universelle de Paris, Paris.
- 1910 International Exhibition of Fine Arts, National Museum of Fine Arts, Santiago.
- 1930. Exhibition of the 50th anniversary of its Foundation, 1880 - 1930, Chilean National Museum of Fine Arts, Santiago.
- 1940 Chilean Art Exhibition, Buenos Aires.
- 1949 Exhibition of the Portrait in Chilean Plastic, National Museum of Fine Arts, Santiago.
- 1972 Some Forgotten Painters, Cultural Institute of Las Condes, Santiago.
- 1981 Rescue of Chilean Painting, National Museum of Fine Arts, Santiago.
- 1986 Chilean Plastic, Collection of the National Museum of Fine Arts, Valdivia.
- 1987 Panorama of Chilean Painting, Cultural Institute of Las Condes, Santiago.
- 2000 Chile 100 Years - First Period 1900 - 1950, National Museum of Fine Arts, Santiago.

== Awards and distinctions ==
- 1864 Pensioned by the Government of Chile to study painting in France.
- 1877 Second Medal, Official Salon, Santiago.
- 1882 Second Medal, South American Continental Exhibition, Buenos Aires.
- 1884 Third Medal, Official Salon, Santiago.

== See also ==
- Diego Portales Palazuelos
- Alberto Orrego Luco
- Álvaro Casanova Zenteno
- Eugenio Cruz Vargas

== Bibliography ==
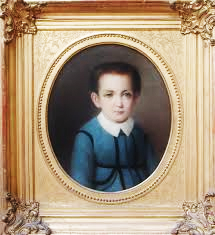
Child portrait

- ÁLVAREZ URQUIETA, LUIS. Painting in Chile: Luis Álvarez Urquieta Collection. Santiago: S / E., 1938.
- ÁLVAREZ URQUIETA, LUIS. Brief History of Painting in Chile, some critical judgments and payroll of the Luis Álvarez Urquieta Collection. Santiago: S / E, 1938.
- LIBRARY AND INFORMATION CENTER. Documentary Archive of the Artist Pascual Ortega.
- BINDIS FULLER, RICARDO. Chilean Painting: From Gil de Castro to the present day. Santiago: Ed. Philips, 1980 - 1984. (Calendar - Philips Collection, V. 1).
- BINDIS, RICARDO. Chilean painting, Two Hundred Years. Santiago: Origo Ediciones, 2006.
- NATIONAL COMMISSION OF FINE ARTS. Chilean Art Exhibition. Buenos Aires, 1940.
- COUSIÑO TALAVERA, LUIS. Catalog of the National Museum of Fine Arts. Santiago: Imp. Universe, 1922.
- GALAZ GASPAR, IVELIC MILAN. Chile: Chilean Painting, Agenda 1973. Santiago: Ed. Lord Cochrane, 1973.
- HERNANDEZ R., BALTAZAR. Mural Art of Chillán. Chillán: Imprenta La Discusión S.A., 1996.
- CULTURAL INSTITUTE OF LAS CONDES. Some Forgotten Painters. Texts of F.L.P. and Vìctor Carvacho Herrera. Santiago, 1972.
- CULTURAL INSTITUTE OF LAS CONDES. Panorama of Chilean Painting from the Precursors to Montparnasse: Retrospective Exhibition based on the History of Chilean Painting by Antonio R. Romera. Santiago, 1987.
- CULTURAL INSTITUTE OF PROVIDENCE. Chilean painting rescue. Santiago, 1981.
- IVELIC, MILAN AND GALAZ, GASPAR. Painting in Chile: From the Colony until 1981. Valparaíso: Eds. University of Valparaíso, 1981.
- LIHN, ENRIQUE. Enrique Lihn, Texts about Art. Santiago: Diego Portales University, 2008.
- MONTECINO, SERGIO. Between Musicians and Painters. Santiago: Editorial Amadeus, 1985.
- MUNICIPALITY OF VALDIVIA. Chilean plastic. Collection of the National Museum of Fine Arts. Valdivia - Chile: Ministry of Public Education, 1986.
- NATIONAL MUSEUM OF FINE ARTS: Exhibition of the 50th anniversary of its Foundation: 1880 - 1930. Santiago, 1930.
- NATIONAL MUSEUM OF FINE ARTS. Exhibition of the Portrait in Chilean Plastic. Santiago, 1949.
- NATIONAL MUSEUM OF FINE ARTS. Chilean painting. Santiago: National Museum of Fine Arts, 1977.
- NATIONAL MUSEUM OF FINE ARTS. The Child in Chilean Painting. Santiago, 1979.
