= Manuel Antonio Caro =

Chilean painter (1835–1903)

Manuel Antonio Caro Olavarría
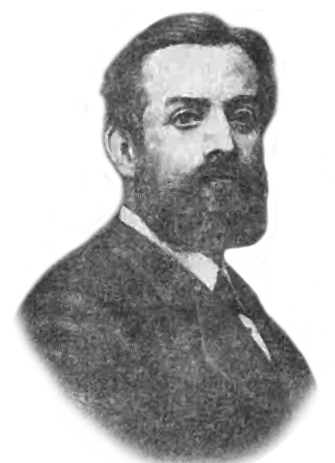
- Manuel Antonio Caro Olavarría
- Born: 3 June 1835; Ancud
- Died: 14 July 1903 (aged 68); Valparaíso
- Other name: Manuel Antonio Caro Olavarría
- Education: Padres Franceses de Valparaíso; Academia de Pintura; École des Beaux-Arts, Paris
- Occupation: Painter
- Years active: 1859-1903

Manuel Antonio Caro Olavarría (born Manuel Antonio Caro Olavarría) (June 3, 1835 – July 14, 1903) was a Chilean painter and is classed among Chile's best-loved artists. The son of Victorino Caro y Cárcamo and Asunción de Olavarría y Sierpe, he was named Caro Olavarría. The first Chilean student to attend the École des Beaux-Arts in Paris, Caro's body of work included portraits and scenes of everyday life, and earned him high honors and international recognition.

== Life and work ==
Born in Ancud into a wealthy family in central coastal Chile, Caro initially wanted to become a businessman, but during a prolonged illness confining him to bed, he discovered his interest in the visual arts. In 1859 at age 23, he went to Paris at his father's urging where he befriended the French painter Paul Césaire Gariot who worked in the Neoclassical style. Gariot trained him in portrait painting, and Caro assisted him in decorating the Tuileries.

In 1865, he was the first Chilean student to attend the École des Beaux-Arts in Paris. In 1866 he returned to his home country and opened a studio in the plaza near Iglesia de la Matriz, Valparaíso. Some of his contemporaries were Pascual Ortega Portales, Antonio Smith, Nicolás Guzmán, and Miguel Campos. Once home, he faced a great deal of competition from his rivals which affected recognition for his work after he died.

Caro worked in an academic style in portrait painting, rather than in the more experimental styles then gaining a foothold in Europe. His subject matter often involved genre scenes of folklife, historical and 'costumbrista' subjects (subjects in costume acting out an historical event), and urban society of the 19th century. One of his famous paintings is his 1873 work The Zamacueca, a colorful folk dance scene that for a time was lost during the Pinochet regime, but eventually became an icon of Chilean identity. That painting was one among several that earned him high honors at the Paris Salon of 1872 and at the Exposición del Mercado Central ( Santiago Central Market Exhibition). Caro exhibited his La Chueca Chilena and El Velorio at the 1872 Santiago Exhibition; and for his work at the 1875 International Exposition in Santiago, he earned great distinction.

Caro died in Valparaíso. British and German museums own several of his works. In 1942, the Toledo Museum of Art held an exhibition, Contemporary Chilean Art, that included Caro's work, and stated in their exhibition catalog that La Zamacueca was destroyed in a fire. However, Caro was alleged to have executed two versions of the painting, and one of those is now in the collection of the Presidency of the Republic of Chile.

== Selected works ==
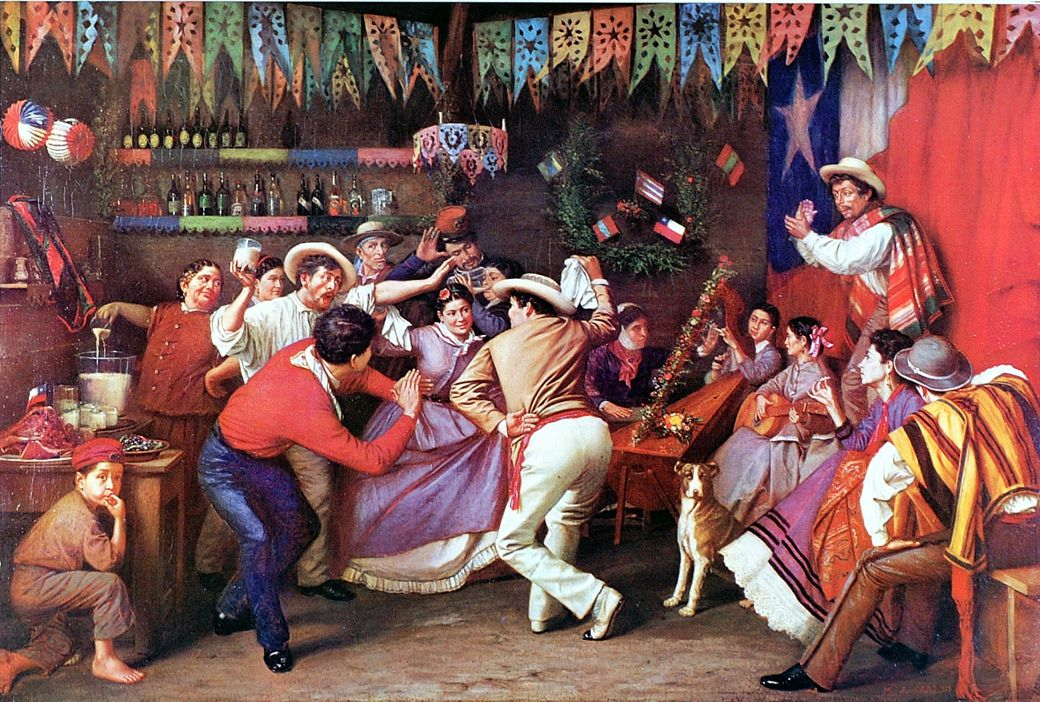
The Zamacueca, 1873
Collection: Presidency of the Republic

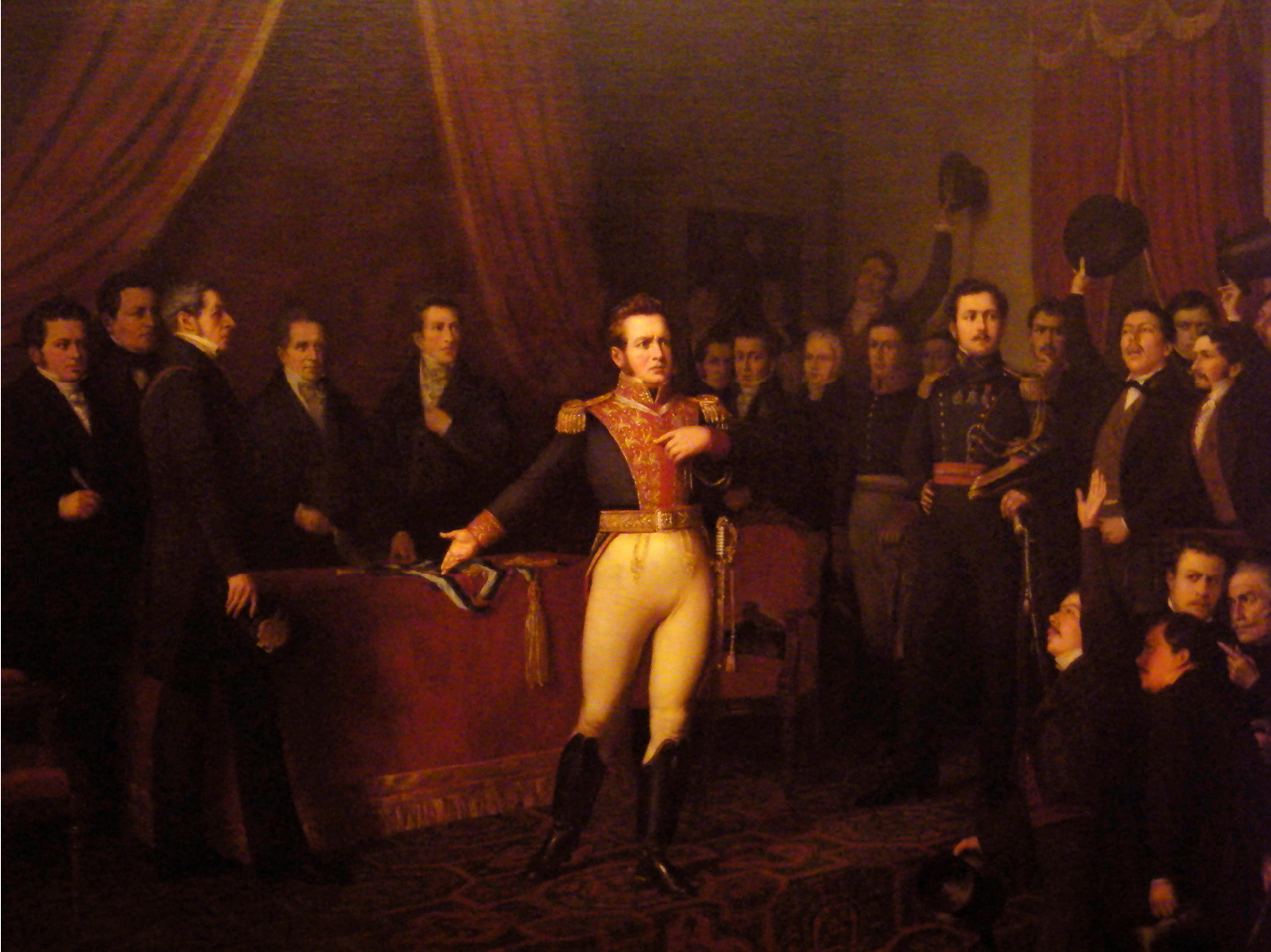
Abdication of O´Higgins, 1875

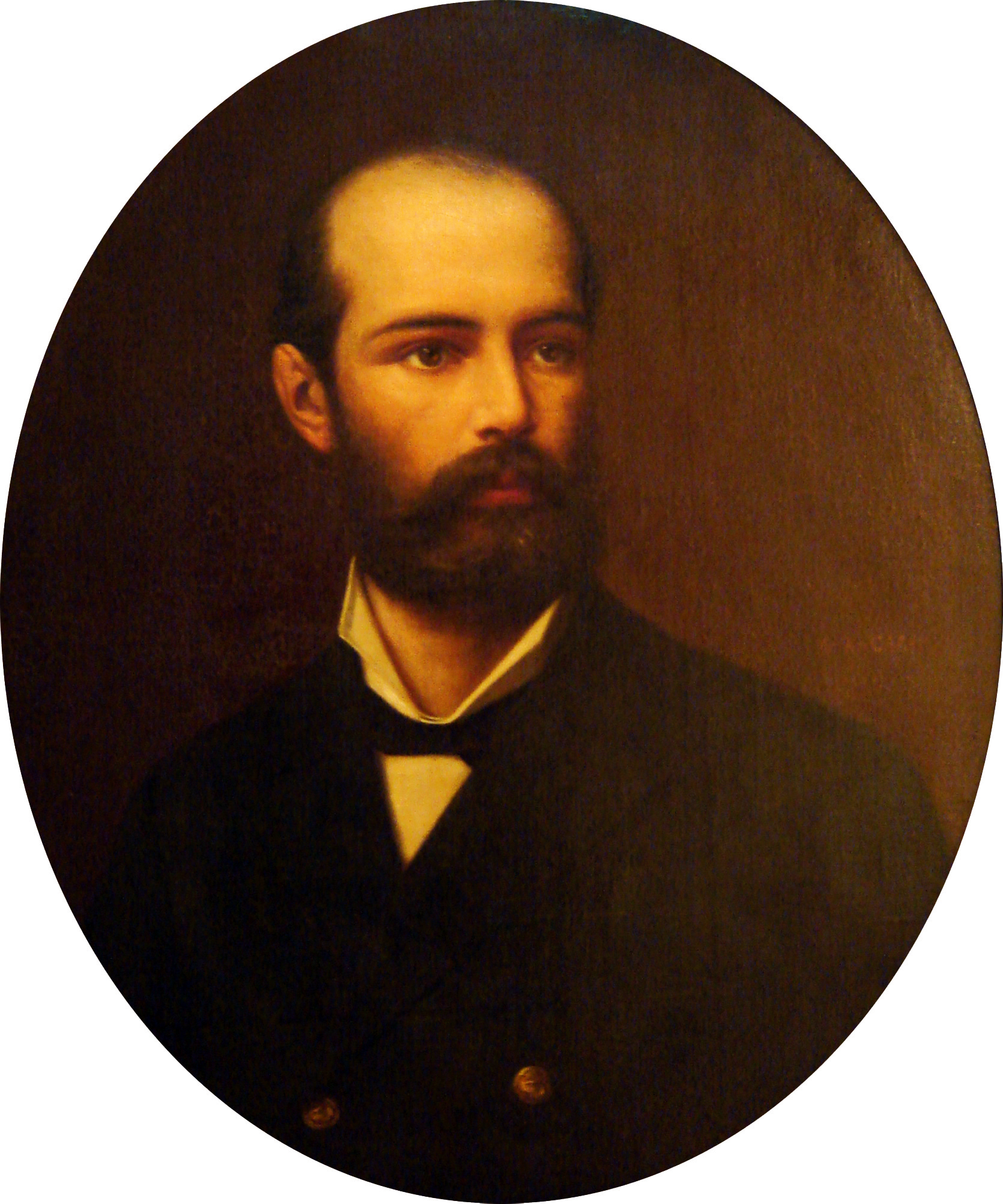
Frigate Captain, Arturo Prat, n.d.

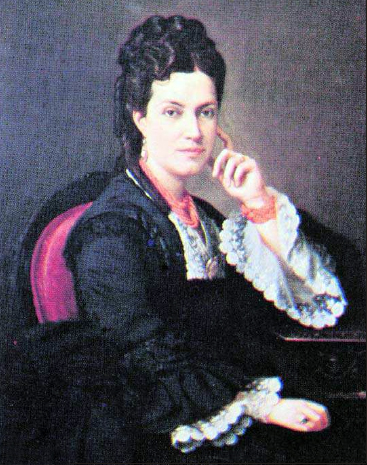
Clara Josefina Naegelé Guetot, wife of Chilean Rear-Admiral Juan Williams Rebolledo, n.d.

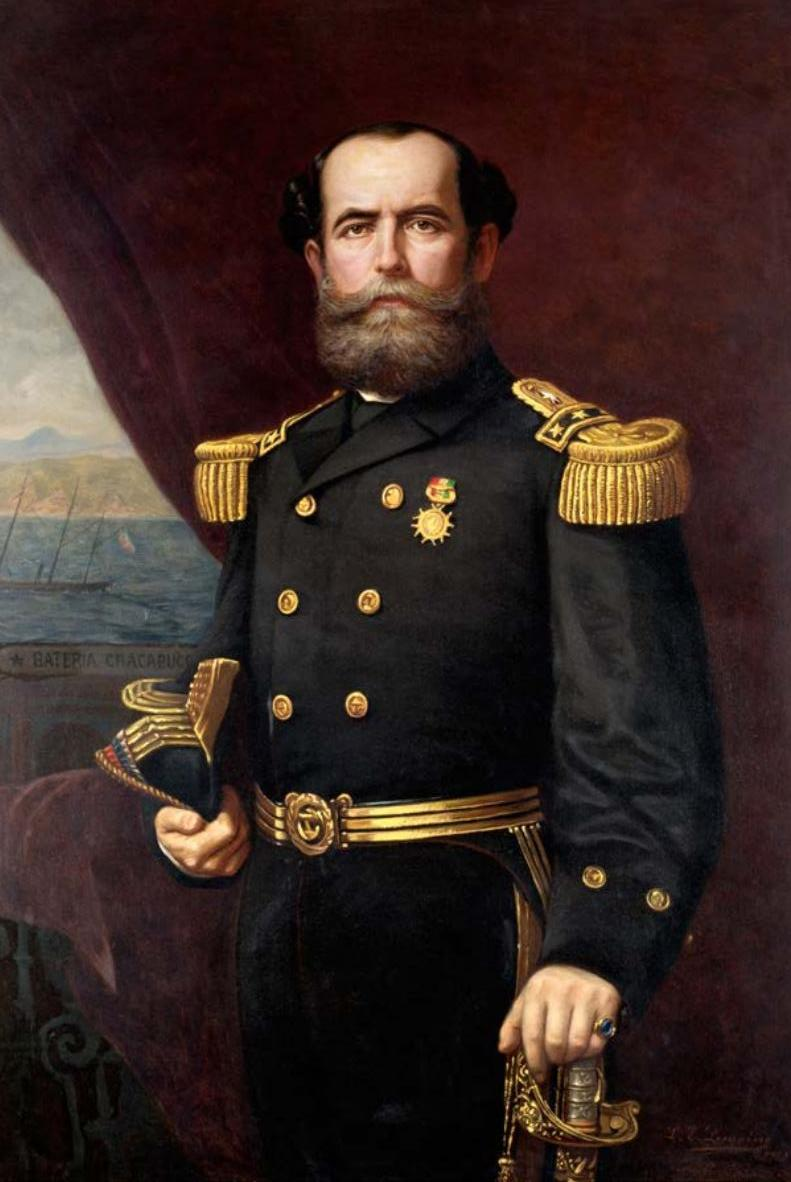
Juan Williams Rebolledo, 1871

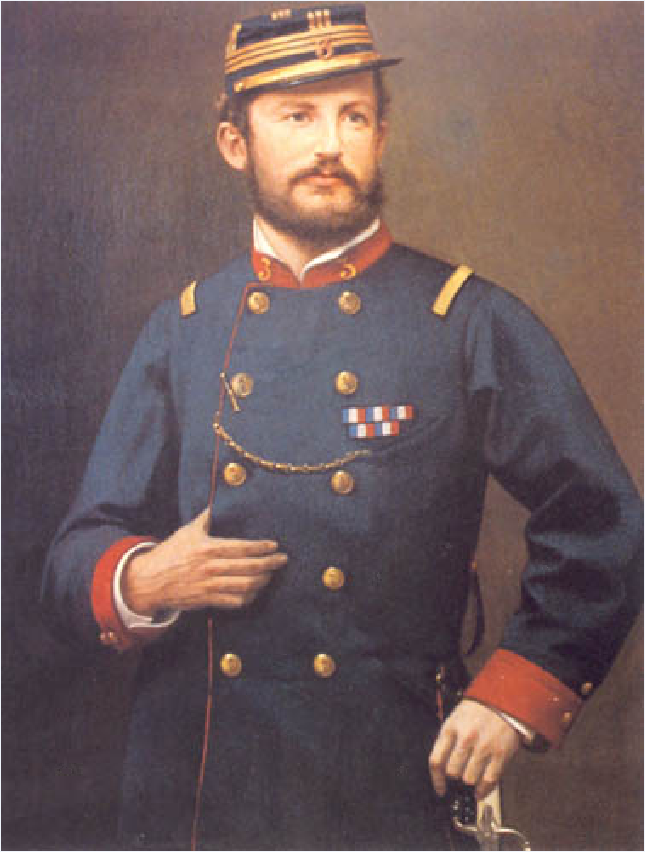
Captain Ricardo Serrano Montaner (1854–1881), n.d.

== See also ==
- Museo Nacional de Bellas Artes
- Álvaro Casanova Zenteno
- Thomas Somerscales
