= Arts Faculty, University of Chile =

Art unit of the University of Chile

Coordinates: 33.439083°S 70.654694°W

The Arts Faculty, University of Chile (Spanish: Facultad de Artes de la Universidad de Chile), is an academic discipline within at the University of Chile, which is located in the capital city of Santiago. Within the Arts Faculty the following departments are represented: visual arts, dance, music, sound, theatre, and arts theory; which occupy three buildings on campus.

== History ==
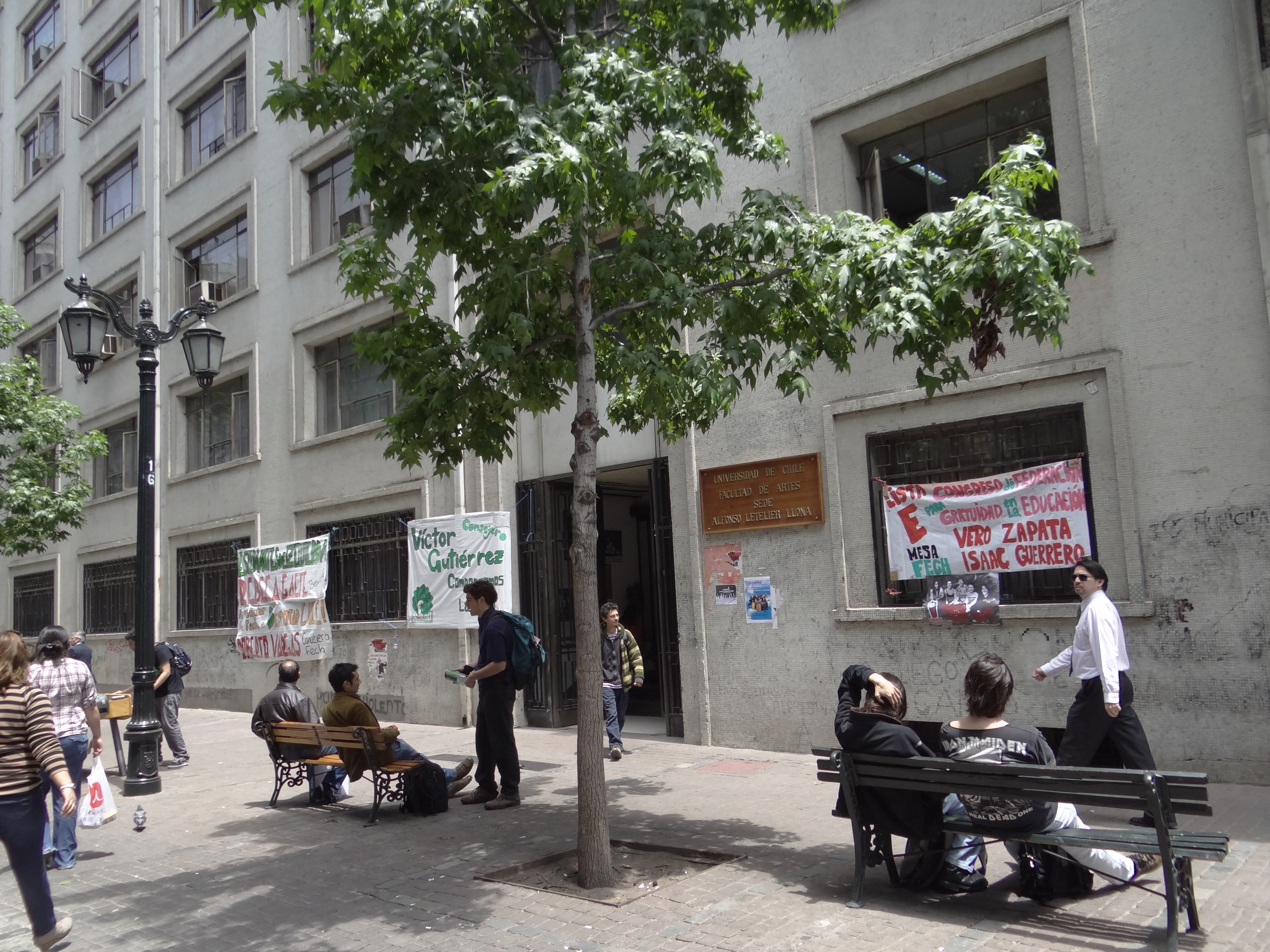
Alfonso Letelier Llona building, Arts Faculty, University of Chile

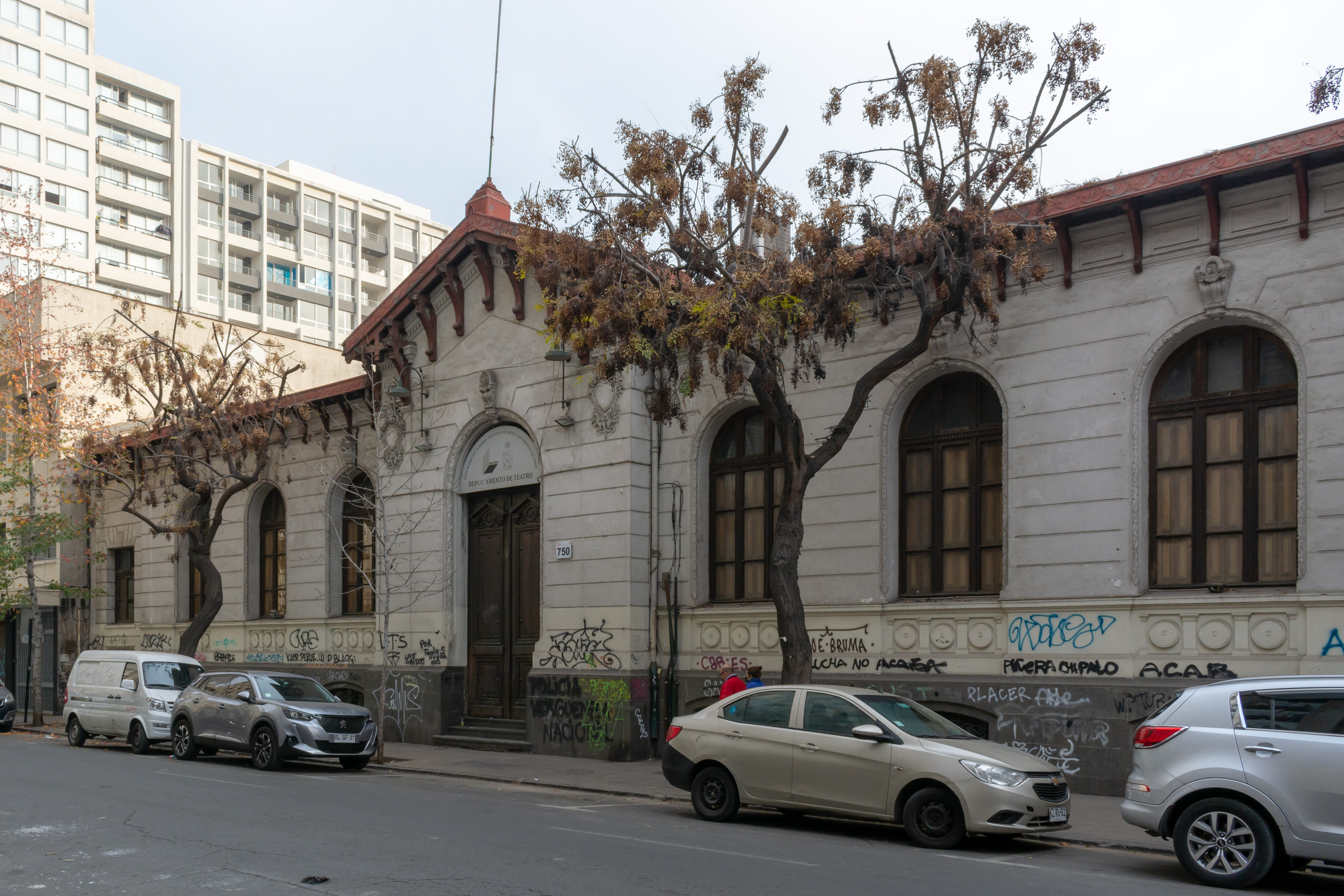
Pedro de la Barra building, Arts Faculty at University of Chile

Founded in 1849 under the leadership of Alejandro Ciccarelli, as the School of Fine Arts of Santiago (Spanish: Escuela de Bellas Artes de Santiago), and later known as the Academy of Painting (Spanish: Academia de Pintura). In 1932, the Academy of Painting merged with the University of Chile to create the Department of Visual Arts.

The Sculpture and Design School was added five years later and the school renamed The Fine Arts School. The Music School at University of Chile was also created in 1849. By 1929 and during a cultural boom both schools, plus the Kinematic School, were merged and became what is today's University of Chile's Arts Faculty. In 1941 The Dance Department was added from which the Chilean National Ballet was born. The Teatro Experimental was also created that year. It was founded by Pedro de la Barra and is today the modern day Theater Department.

Today the Arts Faculty is one of the most important cultural hubs in Chile.
