= Thomas Somerscales =

English teacher, sailor and painter

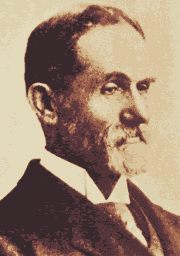
Thomas Somerscales

Thomas Jacques Somerscales (29 October 1842 – 27 June 1927) was an English teacher, sailor and painter. He is also considered a Chilean painter as he began his career as an artist there. Many of his landscapes evoke the region and many of his marine paintings feature notable events in Chilean naval history and have become patriotic national icons in that country.

== Life and career ==
His father was a shipmaster, who sketched, and his uncle was an amateur painter. However he had no formal training as an artist and originally became a teacher in the Royal Navy.

He joined the Royal Navy in 1863 as a schoolmaster, and served mostly in the Pacific, firstly on HMS Cumberland for six years, then the corvette HMS Clio and finally HMS Zealous, flagship of the Pacific Station. Having caught a fever in Tahiti, he was subsequently invalided ashore at Valparaiso, Chile and discharged from the Royal Navy.

He settled in Chile and from 1874 teaching at The Mackay School in Valparaíso he started working as a professional painter. By 1893 (when he had returned to Britain) he was still being referred to in England as a "little known artist" but had gained some praise.

Although he returned to Britain in 1892 and spent most of the following thirty-five years in his home country, he remains far better known in Chile (where his work is on display in several prestigious locations) than he is in the UK. His life's work has been detailed in the book: "Thomas Somerscales, Marine Artist" by Alex A. Hurst.

He is commemorated with a green plaque on The Avenues, Kingston upon Hull.

== Selected paintings ==
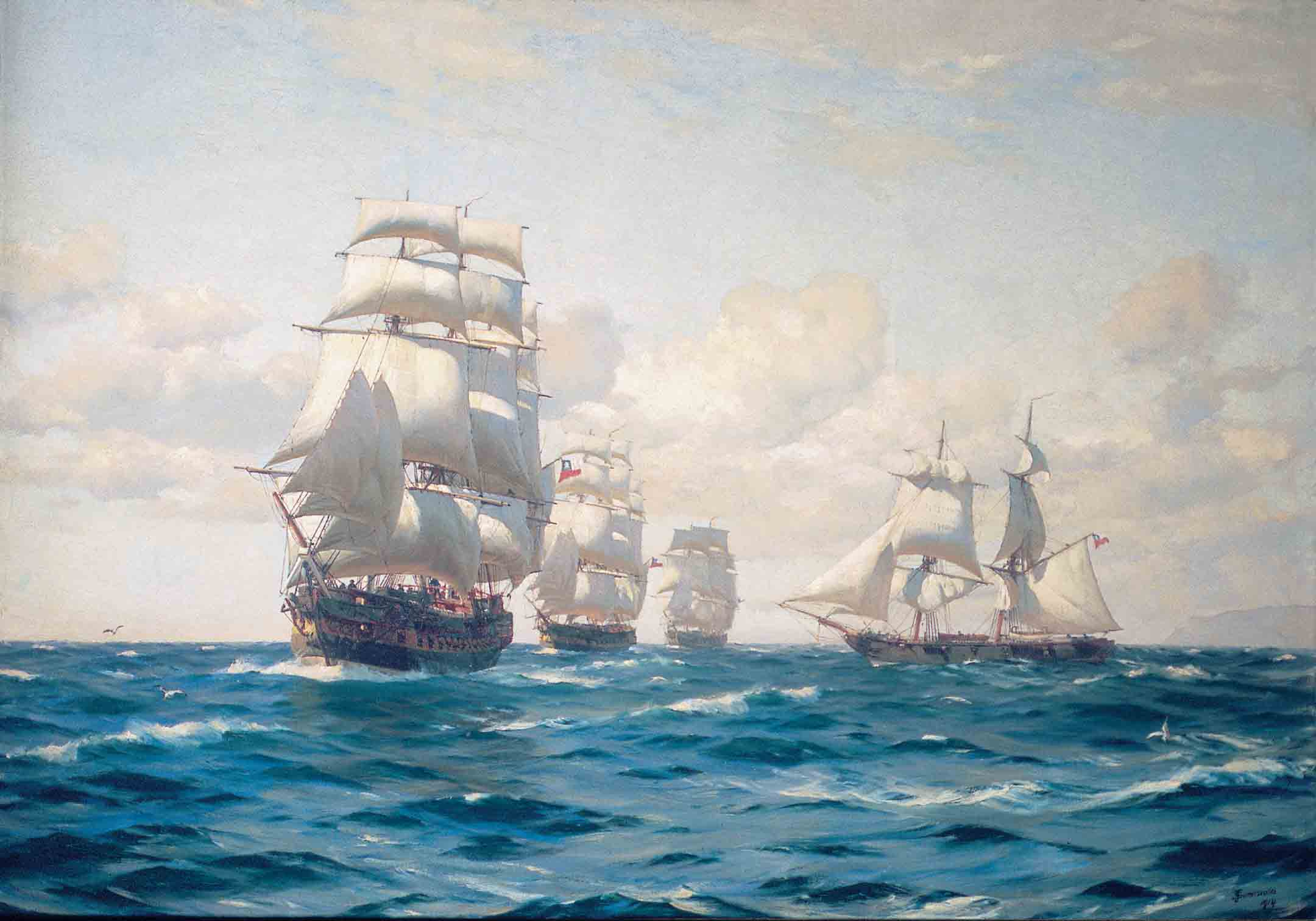
The First Chilean Navy Squadron

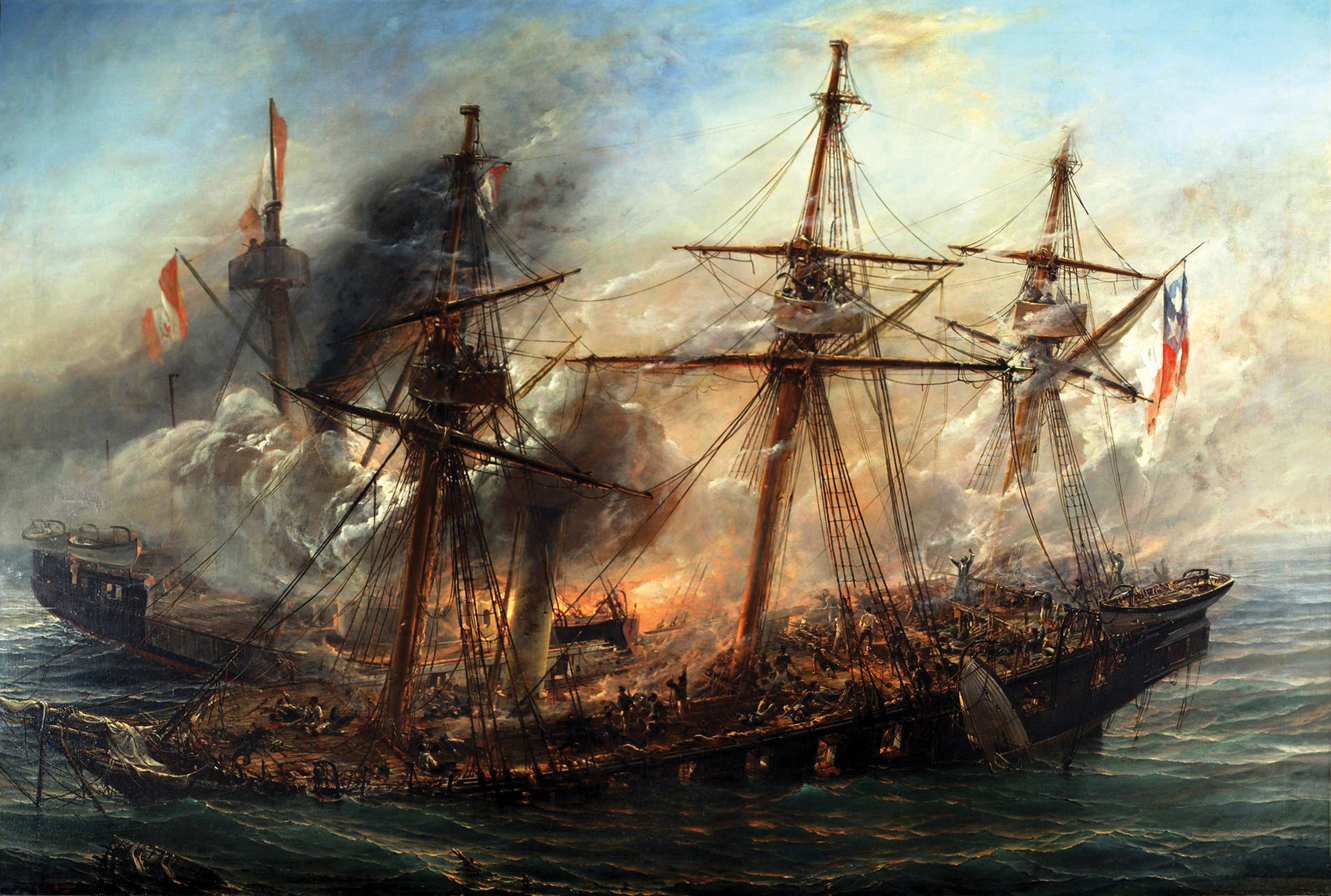
Sinking of the Esmeralda at the Battle of Iquique

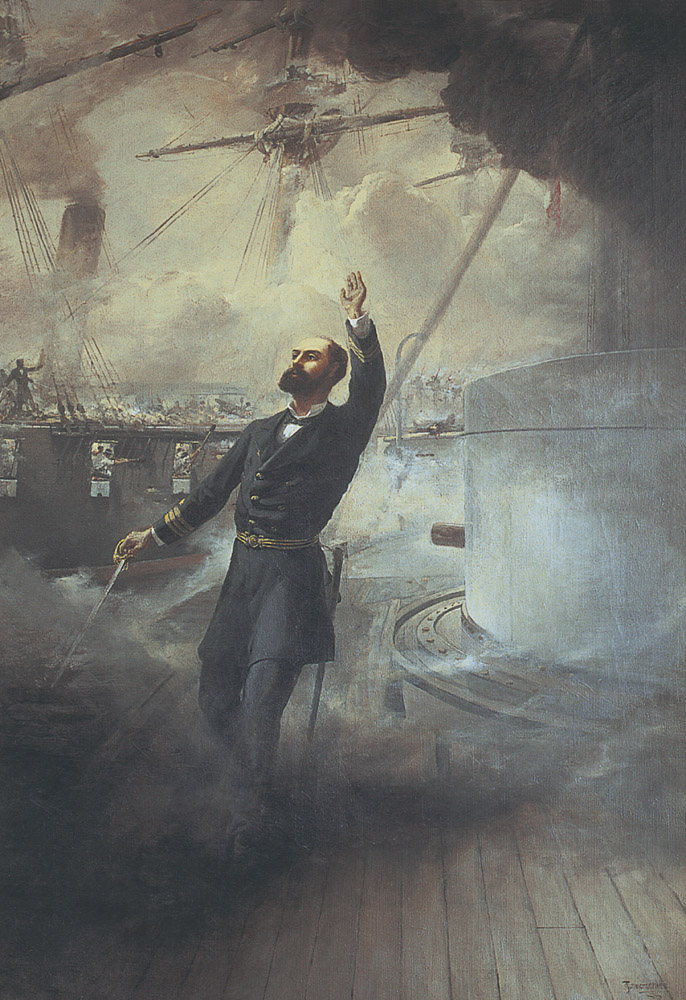
The Death of Arturo Prat on the Huascar

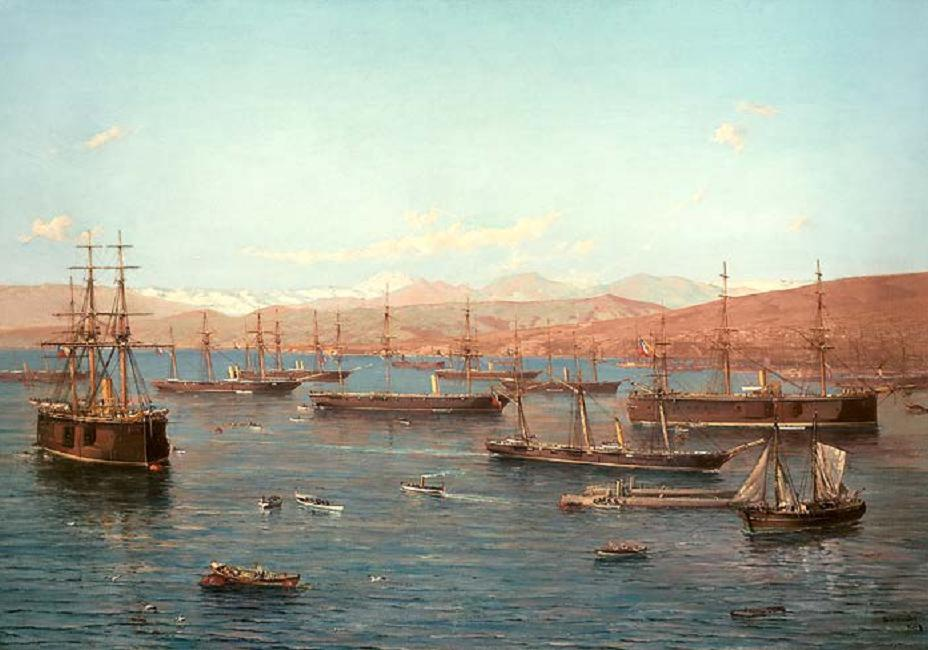
Chilean Navy, 1879

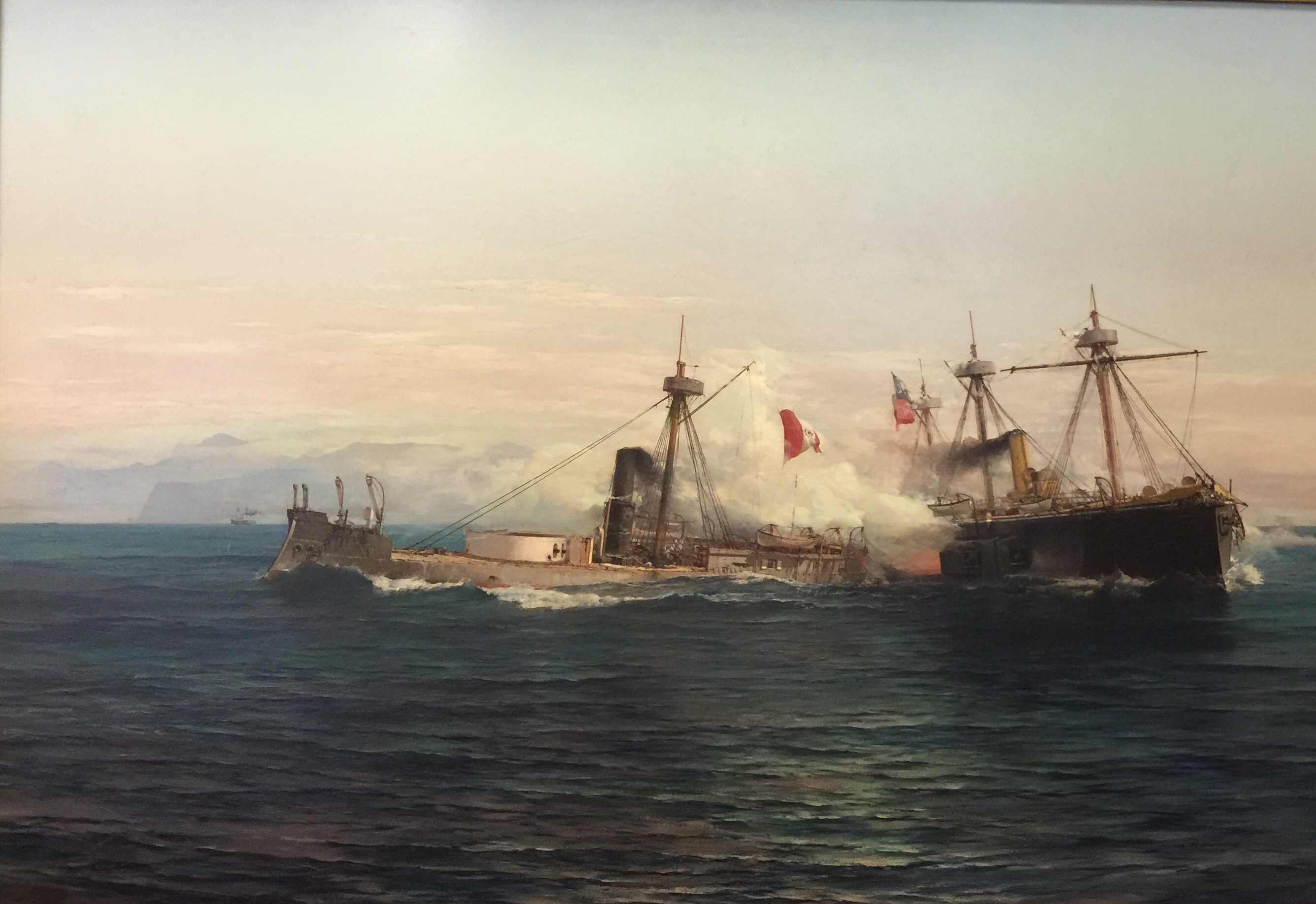
The Battle of Angamos

== See also ==
- Álvaro Casanova Zenteno
- Manuel Antonio Caro
- Alberto Orrego Luco
