= Alejandro Ciccarelli =

Italian-born Chilean painter and educator

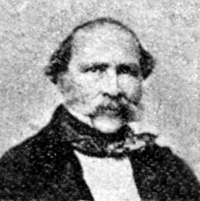
Alejandro Cicarelli

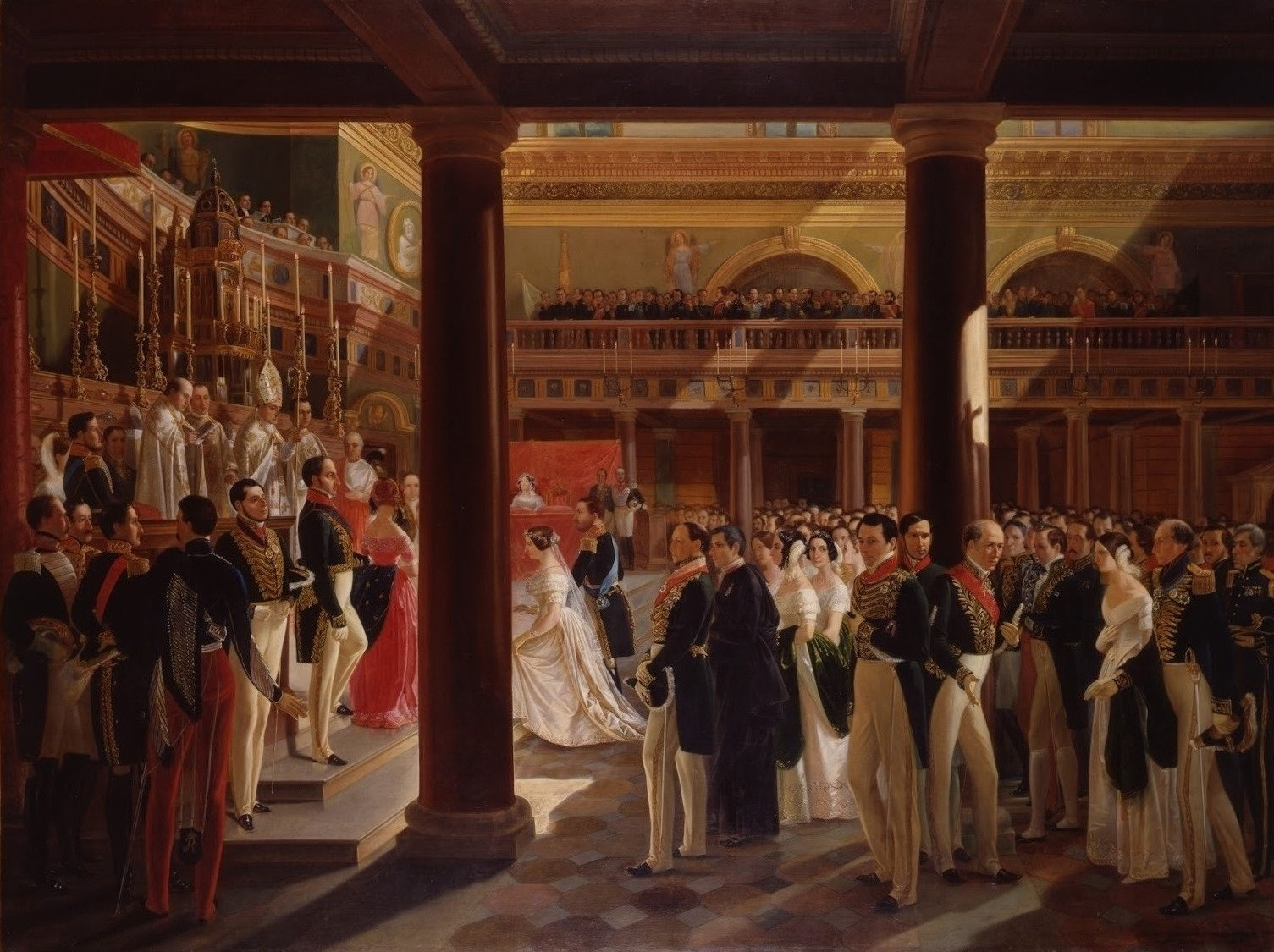
Wedding by proxy of the Empress Teresa Cristina of Brazil, 1846

Alejandro Ciccarelli Manzoni, originally Alessandro Ciccarelli (25 January 1811, Naples - 5 May 1879, Santiago) was an Italian-born Chilean painter and educator. He was the first director of the Academy of Painting in Santiago, Chile.

== Biography ==
He began his studies at the Accademia di Belle Arti di Napoli, and completed them in Rome, where he came under the influence of the Neoclassical painter Vincenzo Camuccini.

In 1843, he was introduced to Emperor Pedro II of Brazil, who hired him as a court painter and Master of Painting for the Empress consort, Teresa Cristina. At the age of thirty-three, he became the leading artist in Brazil and was charged with reorganizing the Imperial Academy of Fine Arts in Rio de Janeiro.

Six years later, in 1849, the Chilean Consul in Brazil, Carlos Hochkolf, invited him to come to Chile and help establish an art academy there. He accepted the offer and was instrumental in creating the Academy of Painting (Santiago, Chile). He served as director of the academy of twenty years; focusing on the European Academic tradition, with focus on the Greco-Roman canons. The institution was often criticized for discouraging creativity and ignoring the artistic possibilities of Chile itself. Among his harshest critics were the French-born painter, Ernest Charton and one of the academy's first students, Antonio Smith.

Despite these criticisms, most of Chile's prominent painters of the time began as his students; including Nicolás Guzmán Bustamante, Pascual Ortega, Pedro Lira, Cosme San Martín, Onofre Jarpa, Manuel Antonio Caro, and Agustina Gutiérrez.

In 1853 he became a Chilean citizen. In 1869, he resigned his position at the academy and was replaced by the German-born painter, Ernst Kirchbach. He remained in Chile until his death.

His works include an unknown, though large, number of portraits as well as religious and mythological scenes; based on Classical models. The motif of the "Painting-within-a-painting" had a particular appeal for him. A few colorful landscapes stand out as exceptions.

== Sources ==
- Biography @ the Library of the Chilean National Museum of Fine Arts
- Lima, Valeria; Quiroga, Samuel. "Ciccarelli: paisagem em contradição". In: Hoffmann, Ana, et al. (Eds.) História da arte: coleções, arquivos e narrativas. São Paulo: Editora Urutau, 2015, pp. 239 – 257. ISBN 978-85-69433-07-1
