= Hermógenes Irisarri =

Chilean poet, journalist, and diplomat (1819–1886)

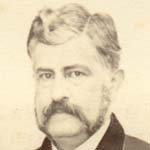
- Born: Hermógenes Irisarri Trucíos; 19 April 1819; Santiago, Chile
- Died: 22 July 1886 (aged 67); Santiago, Chile
- Other name: Hermógenes de Irisarri
- Occupations: Poet; journalist; editor; diplomat
- Spouse: Ana Rosa Luco Huici
- Children: 1
- Father: Antonio José de Irisarri
- Relatives: Antonio Smith (nephew)
- Family: Larraín family

Hermógenes Irisarri Trucíos (19 April 1819 – 22 July 1886), was a Chilean poet, journalist, editor and diplomat. Irisarri served as the Chilean chargé d'affaires to Central America, and later as the Chilean representative to Guatemala.

== Early life and education ==
Irisarri was born on 19 April 1819 in Santiago to Antonio José de Irisarri, a Guatemalan writer, statesman, journalist and politician, and María Mercedes Trucíos y Larraín (died 1871), a member of the Los Ochocientos branch of the Larraín family. Through his sister Carmen Irisarri Trucíos, Irisarri was the uncle of Antonio Smith, a painter, engraver, caricaturist and art teacher.

Irisarri attended the Instituto Nacional General José Miguel Carrera but did not complete his studies.

== Career ==
A member of the Literary Society of 1842, Irisarri later contributed to the societies associated magazine Revista de Santiago (Spanish: Santiago Magazine) which ran from 1848 to 1855. In 1846, Irisarri became an editor for El Mosaico (Spanish: The Mosaic), a weekly newspaper on the development of art, literature, and science in Europe. However, El Mosaico only survived 12 editions before ceasing publication.

Irisarri also contributed to the newspapers La Semana, La Lectura, El Correo de Ultramar, and worked as a translator for El Ferrocarril (Spanish: The Railroad). In 1854, Narciso Desmadryl published two biographies of famous Chilean men under Irisarri's direction and editorship. In 1872, Irisarri began writing for the Peruvian newspaper El Herald.

=== Diplomatic and political career ===
Irisarri was appointed the chargé d'affaires to three Central American republics, before serving as the Chilean representative to Guatemala. From 1885 to 1858, Irisarri was the elected alternate deputy for Petorca.

== Personal life ==
Trucíos was married to Ana Rosa Luco Huici, with whom he had one son.

On 22 July 1886 Irisarri died in Santiago, aged 67.

== Bibliography ==
=== Poems ===
- Irisarri, Hermógenes. Al Sol de Septiembre.
- Irisarri, Hermógenes. A San Martin.
- Irisarri, Hermógenes. La Mujer Adultera.

=== Plays ===
- Irisarri, Hermógenes (1847). El Comercio.

=== Editor ===
- De Irisarri, Hermógenes, ed. (1854). Galería nacional o colección de biografías i retratos de hombres celebres de Chile: tomo primero [National gallery or collection of biographies and portraits of famous men from Chile: Volume I] (in Spanish). Santiago, Chile: Narciso Desmadryl.
- De Irisarri, Hermógenes, ed. (1854). Galería nacional o colección de biografías i retratos de hombres celebres de Chile: tomo segundo [National gallery or collection of biographies and portraits of famous men from Chile: Volume II] (in Spanish). Santiago, Chile: Narciso Desmadryl.
