= Juan Rafael Allende =

Chilean dramatist, author and journalist

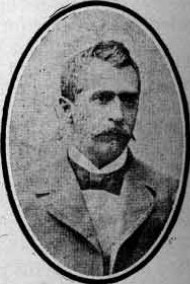
- Juan Rafael Allende
- Born: Juan Rafael Allende Astorga; October 24, 1848; Santiago, Chile
- Died: July 20, 1909 (aged 60); Santiago, Chile
- Occupations: Dramatist, writer and journalist
- Writing career
- Pen name: El Pequén, O.N.E. and El Diablo Azul
- Notable works: Memorias de un perro escritas por su propia pata, La República de Jauja

Juan Rafael Allende (October 24, 1848 – July 20, 1909) was a Chilean dramatist, author and journalist. He was also known to direct and act in his own plays. He is often recognized as the father of humorous press in Chile. Through writing Allende chastised the aristocratic class and defended ideas of egalitarianism and democracy. Above all he is known for challenging the Catholic clergy.

Being a cultural figure, he is related to the oral, popular and country poetry tradition. With this aspects he shares formal characteristics, like revindication of the grotesque and festive.

He also used pseudonyms like El Pequén (The burrowing owl), O.N.E. and El Diablo Azul (The Blue Devil).

== Theatrical works ==
- El qué dirán. 1872
- El entierr
- El Jeneral Daza
- José Romero
- Moro viejo
- Las mujeres de la india
- Huérfano!
- La República de Jauja
- Víctima de su propia lengua
- Un drama sin desenlace
- El Cabo Ponce
- De la taberna al cadalso
