= Onofre Jarpa =

Chilean landscape painter and essayist

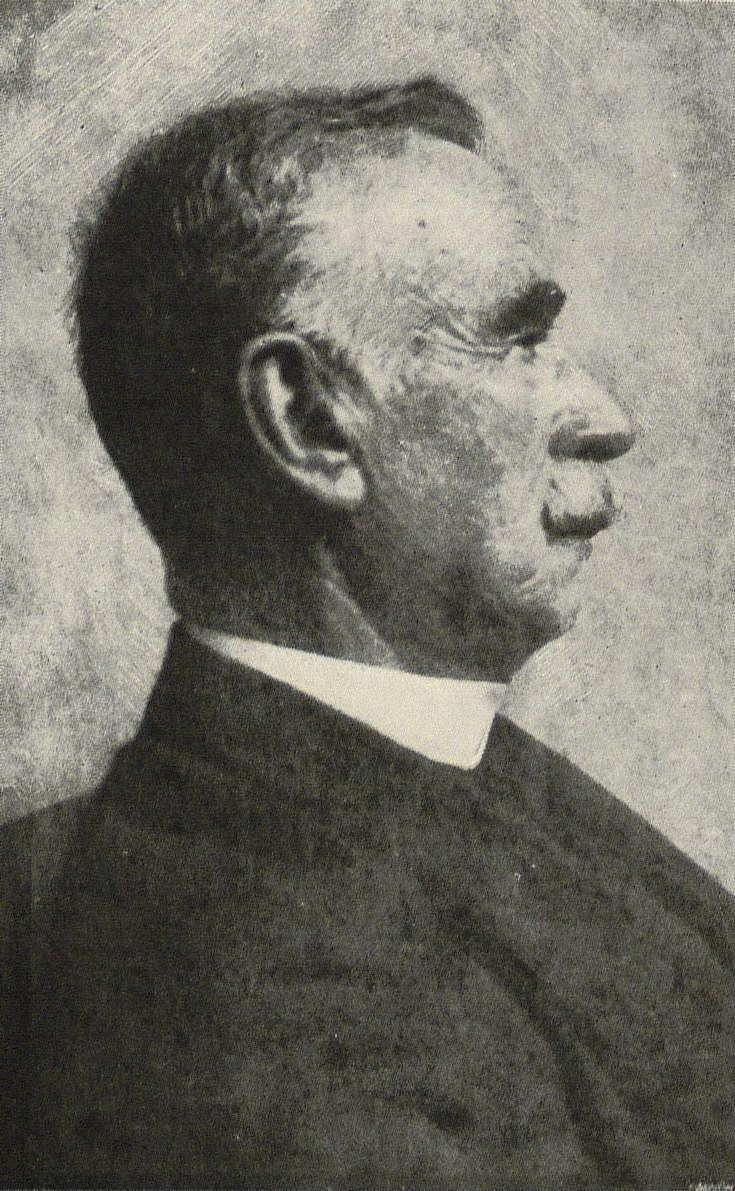
- Jarpa in 1920
- Born: 12 June 1849; Alhué, Chile
- Died: 15 February 1940 (aged 90); Santiago, Chile

Onofre Jarpa Labra (12 June 1849 – 15 February 1940) was a Chilean landscape painter in the Romantic style, and an essayist on various artistic topics.

== Biography ==
His education began at the Instituto Nacional, a prestigious school that has produced many of Chile's presidents. He continued his studies at the Academy of Painting (Santiago, Chile) (also known as Academia de Bellas Artes de Santiago), directed by the conservative Italian painter Alejandro Ciccarelli, who resigned in 1869 and was replaced by the German painter, Ernst Kirchbach, who took a progressive approach that was more amenable to Jarpa's temperament.

In 1875, he won second prize at an international exhibition in Santiago and, six years later, received a government grant to study in Europe, where he visited Spain, Rome and Paris. In Spain, he worked with Francisco Pradilla, who had a major influence on his style. His most important period, however, came during his stay in Venice, where his style became more Naturalistic and he began producing still-lifes. He also became devoted to painting en plein aire. After his European tour, he visited the Holy Land, where he painted scenes from the River Jordan and Mount Carmel.

Upon returning to Chile, he became a teacher. Among his best-known students were José Tomás Errázuriz, Alberto Valenzuela Llanos and the caricaturist Jorge Délano Frederick. He resisted the trends toward French Impressionism, represented by his former classmate, Juan Francisco González, although he was on good terms with the Grupo Montparnasse and the Generación del 13.

In addition to his landscapes and still lifes, he painted several portraits of notable public figures. A quiet, deeply religious man, he continued to paint almost until the day of his death. Most of his works are now in private collections.

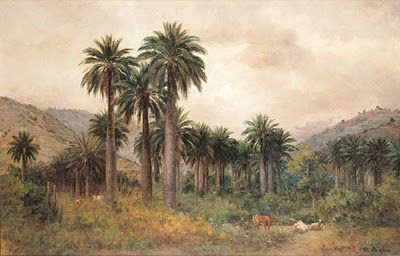
Valley Vista with Chilean Wine Palms (Jubaea)
