= Cosme San Martín =

Chilean painter (1849–1906)

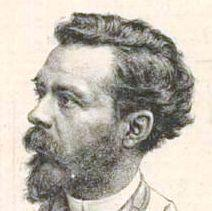
- Caricature of San Martín by Luis Fernando Rojas, 1896
- Born: Cosme San Martín Lagunas; 27 September 1849; Valparaíso, Chile
- Died: 1 April 1906 (aged 56); Santiago, Chile
- Education: École des Beaux-Arts

Cosme San Martín Lagunas (27 September 1849, Valparaíso – 1 April 1906) was a Chilean painter and the first Chilean-born director of the Academy of Painting.

== Biography ==
San Martín was born Cosme San Martín Lagunas on 27 September 1849 (Note: Also cited as 1850.) in Valparaíso, Chile to a musician father. In 1864, he went to Santiago to study at the Academia. His teachers included the school's Director, Alejandro Ciccarelli and Juan Mochi, who had a great influence on his style. Four years later, no older than nineteen, San Martín was named a professor of drawing at the academy.

His work "Jesús y María Magdalena" won a competition that enabled him to obtain a grant for study in Europe. In 1875, he went to Paris, where he studied at the École des Beaux-Arts and worked in the studios of the Spanish painter, Juan Antonio González (1842–1914), along with his fellow Chilean, Pedro Lira. He participated in several exhibitions as well as the Salon. In 1880, his painting "El reposo de la modelo" (The Model's Rest) was highly praised and was included in the Salon's promotional material.

He remained in Europe for ten years. Upon his return to Chile, he was named deputy director of the academy under his former teacher, Juan Mochi. Two years later, when Mochi resigned, San Martín succeeded him as Director. He was very dedicated and well-liked, and apparently continued to act in that capacity until 1900, even though Pedro Lira had technically been appointed to succeed him in 1893. Lira was replaced by the sculptor Virginio Arias.

He was one of the last representatives of Academicism in his country and worked in a wide variety of genres, including portraits, history painting, interior portraits, allegories, marine art and still-lifes. He was also a musician, and often played viola with the orchestra at the Municipal Theater of Santiago, where his father had been employed.

San Martín died aged 56 on 1 April 1906 in Santiago, Chile.

== Selected paintings ==
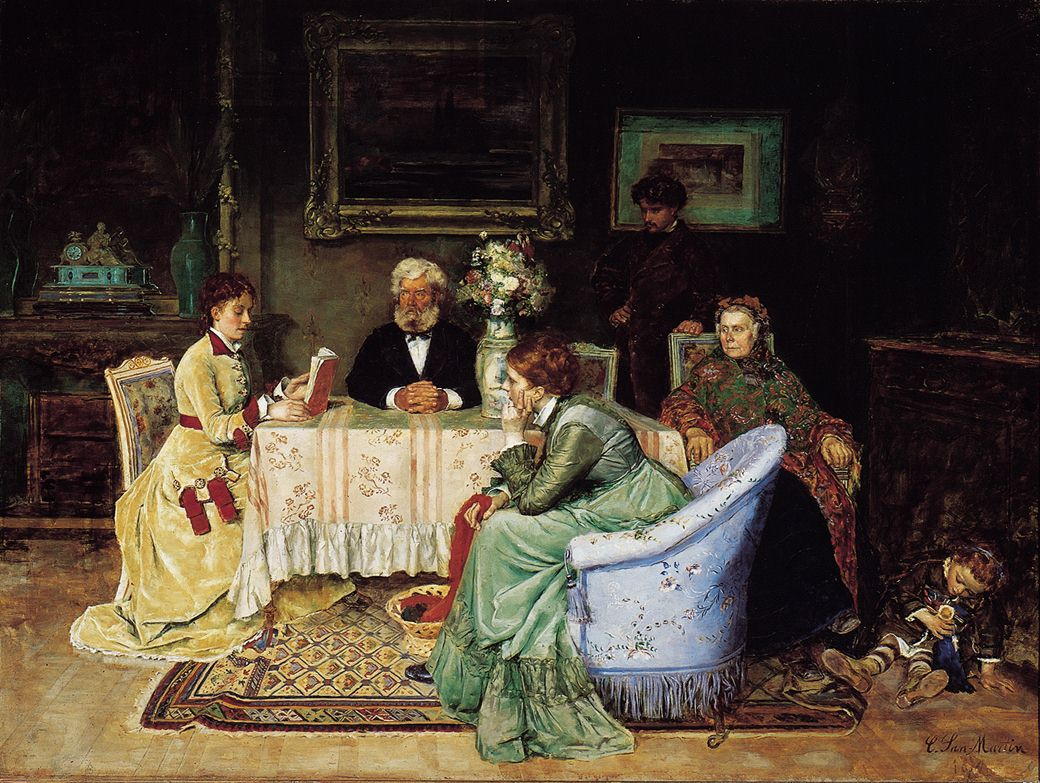
The Reading

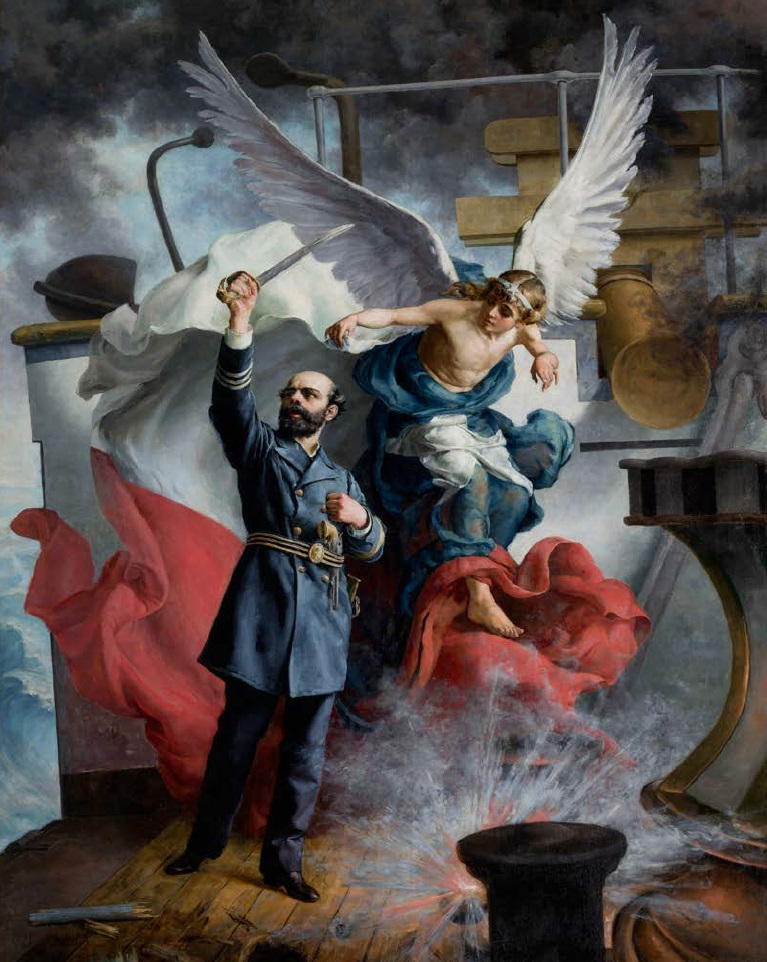
Arturo Prat Guided by the Genius of the Fatherland

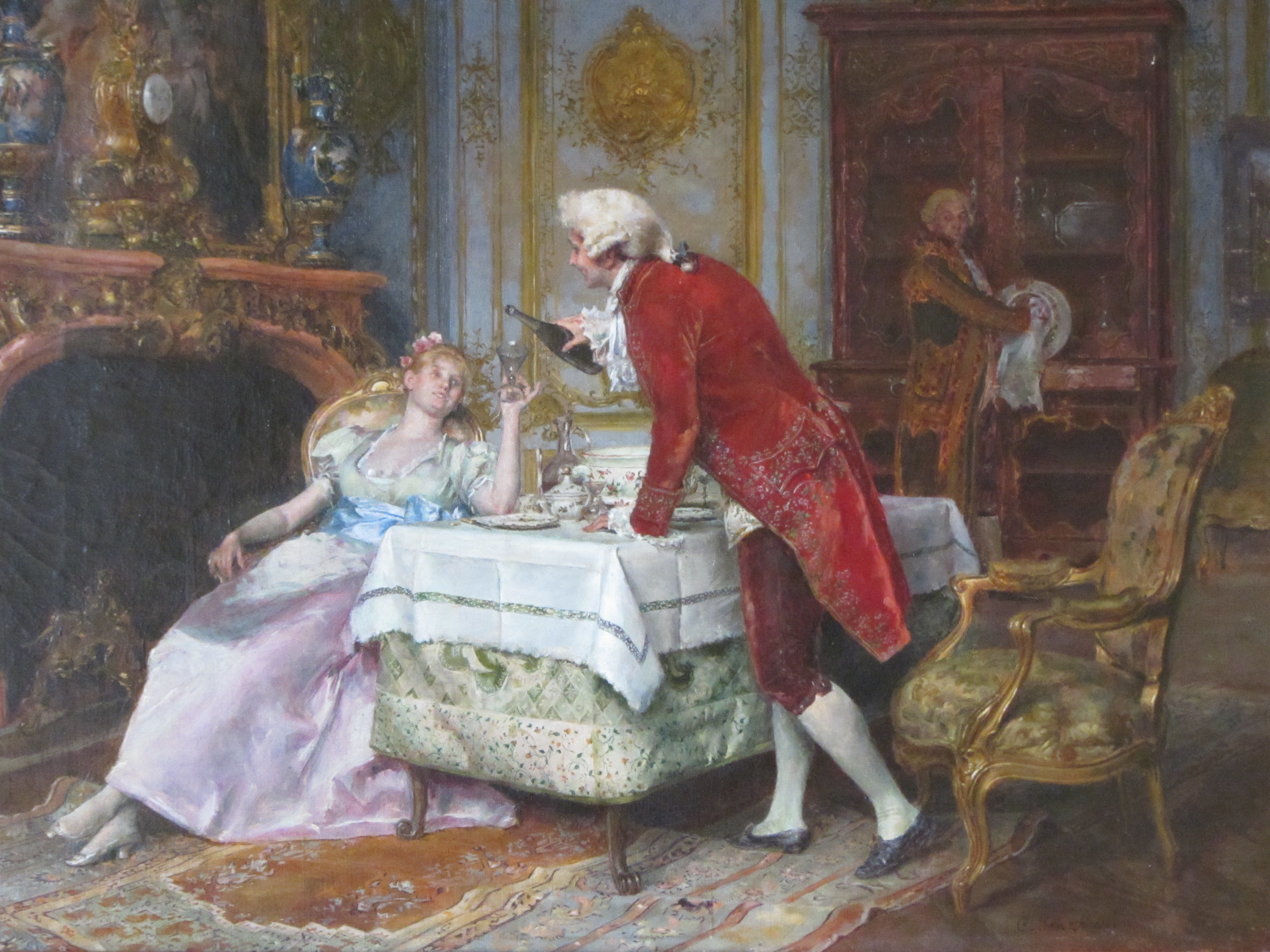
Idyll from the Time
of Louis XV

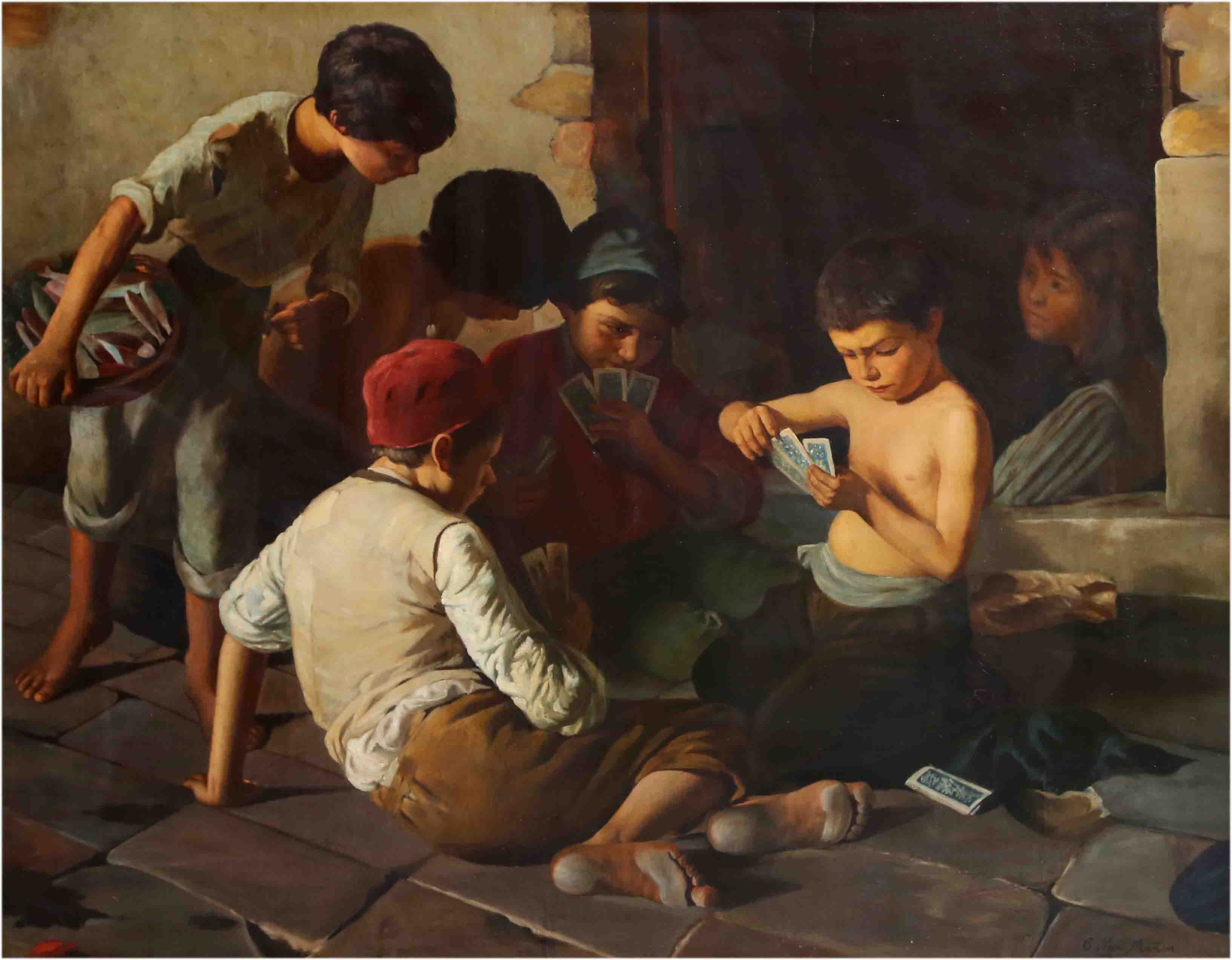
Playing Brisca
