= Alberto Orrego Luco =

Chilean painter and diplomat (1854–1931)

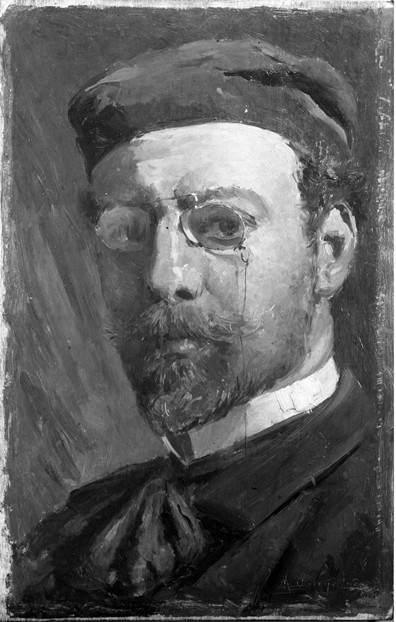
Self-portrait (date unknown)

Alberto Orrego Luco (20 April 1854 in Valparaíso – 2 June 1931 in Santiago) was a Chilean Impressionist landscape painter and diplomat.

== Biography ==
He was born to a family of wealthy farmers. His younger brother, Luis, also became a diplomat and was a popular novelist, among other achievements. He began his education at the English school of Mathews and Linacre. Later, due to economic problems, he was enrolled at the Instituto Nacional, where he began painting. He had his first showing in 1872, at a competition celebrating the establishment of the Mercado Central de Santiago, organized by Benjamín Vicuña Mackenna.

In 1873, with the support of his mother, he went to Europe, accompanied by his sister Elena and his future brother-in-law, Pedro Lira. Originally, it was intended that he would study medicine at the Sorbonne, but he chose to pursue painting instead and found a position in the workshops of Alexandre Cabanel, followed by studies at the Académie Julian.

His work was recognized by the Chilean government and he was granted a stipend that enabled him to participate in the Salon of 1877 and travel to Italy, where he remained for almost ten years, painting landscapes and cityscapes. He got married there in 1883 and, five years later, was appointed consul in Venice.

He returned to Chile in 1890 then, two years later, accepted an appointment as consul in Seville. During this period, his palette brightened and he added fruits and flowers to his canvases. Although he did not personally participate in exhibitions or competitions, his mother quietly made arrangements and he won several awards in Chile.

He returned to Chile for a few years then, in 1897, he was offered the position of Consul General for Italy, with his headquarters in Genoa. He had come to look upon Italy as a second home, so he gladly accepted, but discovered that his workload left little time for painting. By 1914, he was once again living in Rome. Despite the problems caused by World War I, he wanted to stay, but his wife became ill and could not be treated properly there, so they returned to Chile. The improved medical care was of no avail, however, and she died soon after. This, together with the premature death of one of his daughters, resulted in a severe depression that made him increasingly isolated and unsociable; a state of mind which is reflected in his works of that period.

He died peacefully at home, a virtual hermit, and was buried in the family vault next to his wife.

== Gallery ==
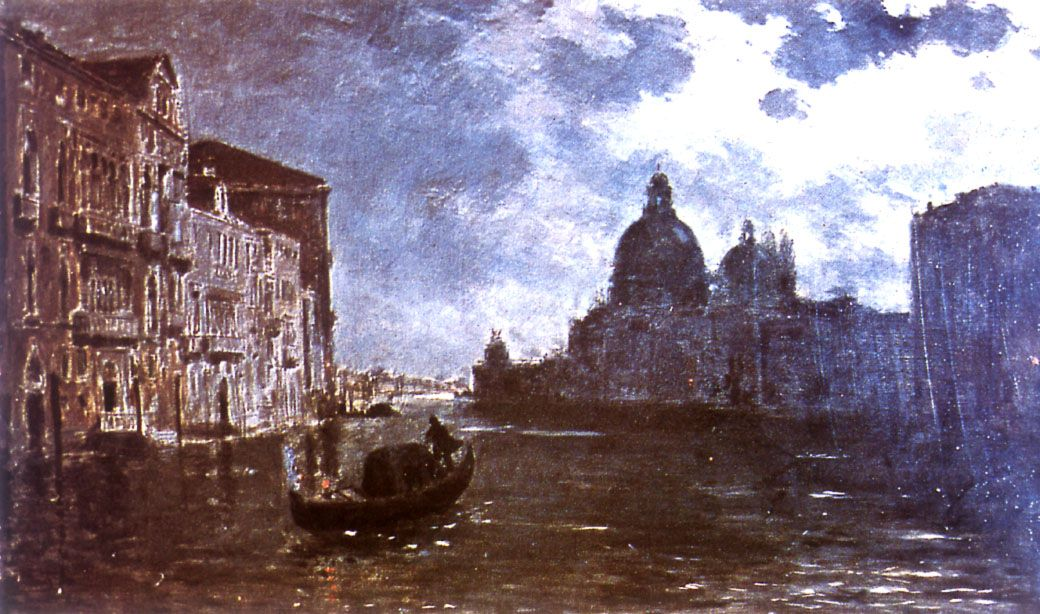
Venice Nocturne

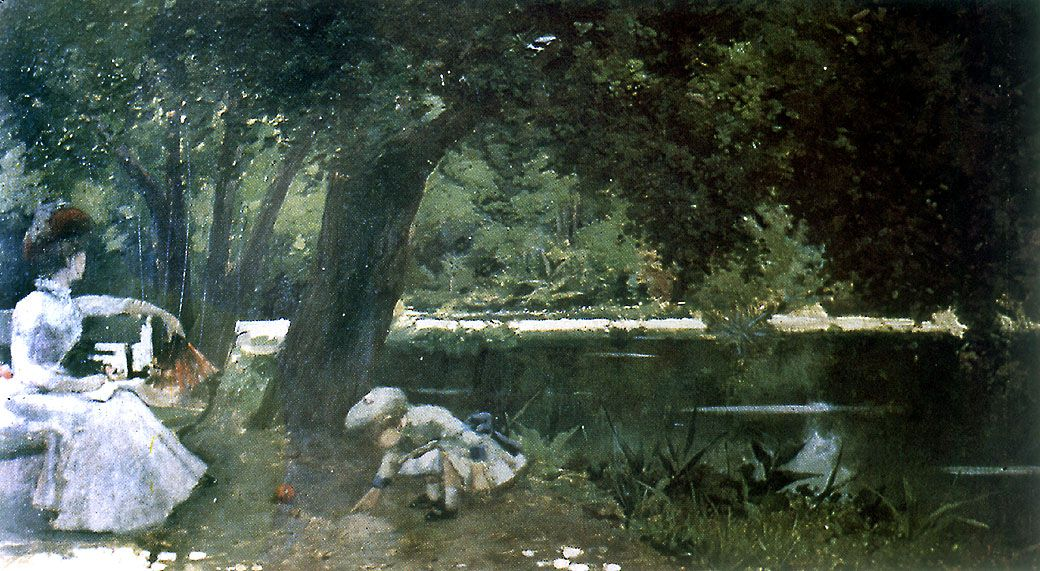
The Lagoon in O'Higgins Park

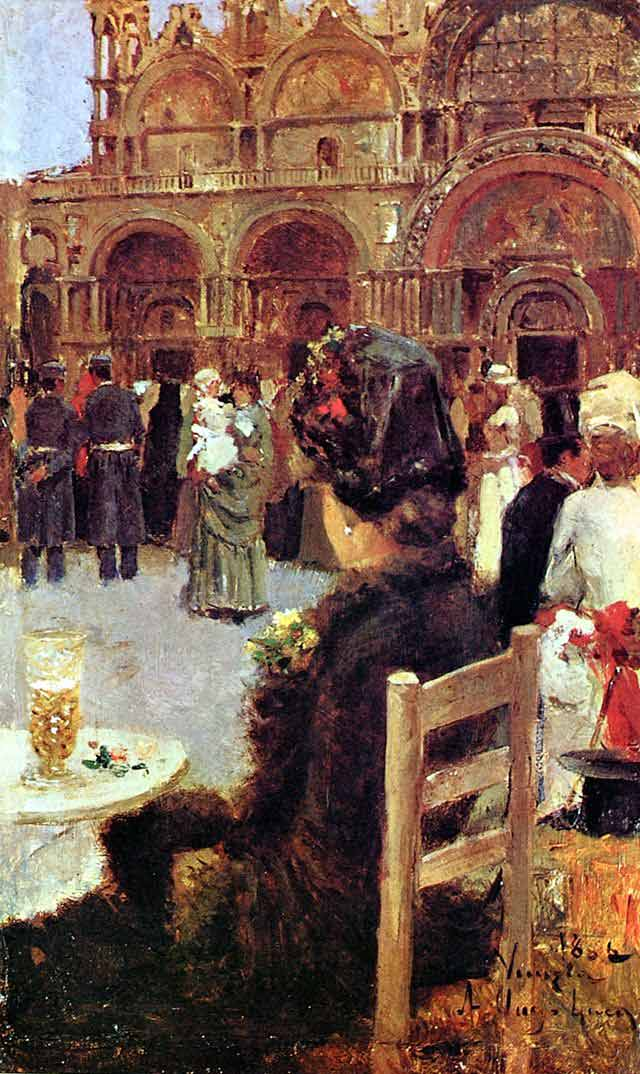
Sundown in Venice

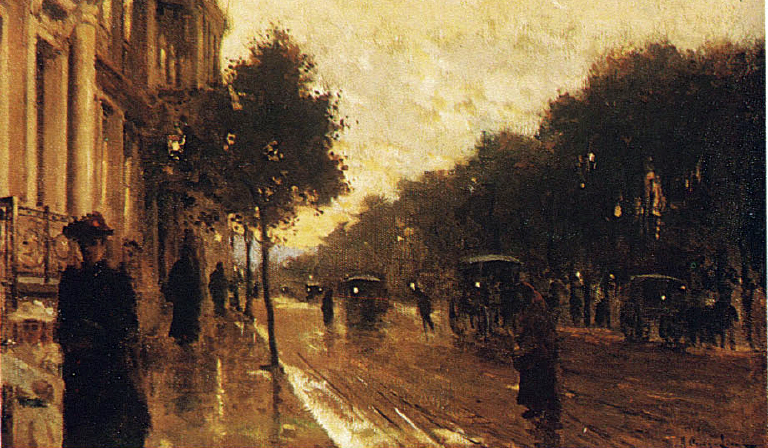
Alameda de las Delicias

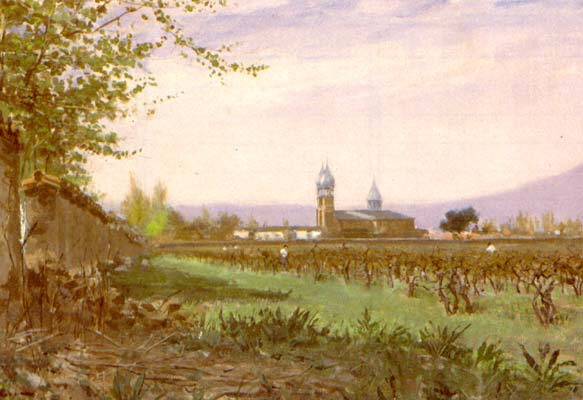
