= Magdalena Mira =

Chilean artist, sculptor (1859–1930)

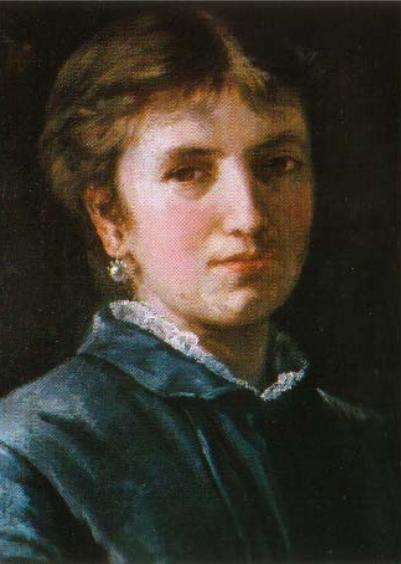
Magdalena Mira, self-portrait

Magdalena Mira Mena (1859–1930) was a Chilean painter and sculptor. Together with her younger sister Aurora, she was one of the earliest recognized female painters not only in Chile but in the whole of Latin America. She was also one of the earliest women to study art at the Santiago School of Painting.

== Biography ==
Born in Santiago in 1859, Mira was the daughter of the painter Gregorio Mira Iñiguez and his wife Mercedes Mena Alviz. Raised in a well-to-do environment, she was introduced to painting by her father who had studied under the French painter Raymond Monvoisin, the first director of the Chilean School of Painting. She went on to study under the school's third director Juan Mochi and the sculptor José Miguel Blanco (1839–1897) at a time when it was quite unusual for women to undertake formal art studies.

As a painter, she worked with oils, creating portraits, usually in profile, which were warmly depicted with a good understanding of her subjects. Often prepared for display in an oval frame, her portraits exhibit a fine appreciation of form and excellent technical execution. One of her finest works, La Viuda (The Widow), is enhanced by careful representation of the details surrounding the subject.

At a time when it was unusual for women to paint professionally, Chilean society was taken aback when the two sisters began to exhibit in the salon of the Museum of Fine Arts in the 1880s under José Manuel Balmaceda's presidency. Competing with such established artists as Pedro Lira, Juan Francisco González and Alfredo Valenzuela Puelma, Magdalena was awarded the Salon's Gold Medal in 1884. Magdalena Mira exhibited her paintings at the Salón Oficial from 1883 to 1897. A number of her works can be seen in the collections of Chile's Museo National de Bellas Artes.

Magdalena Mira died in Santiago on 14 October 1930.

== See also ==
- Agustina Gutiérrez Salazar (1851 – 1886)
- Celia Castro (1860 – 1930)
