= Aurora Mira =

Chilean artist (1863–1939)

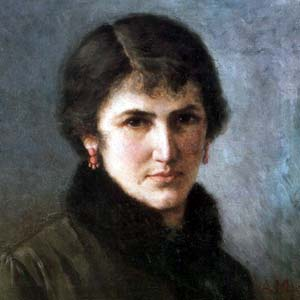
Aurora Mira, self-portrait

Aurora Mira Mena (1863–1939) was a Chilean painter. Together with her elder sister Magdalena, she was one of the earliest recognized female painters not only in Chile but in the whole of Latin America. She was also one of the first women to graduate from the Santiago School of Painting.

== Biography ==
Born in Santiago in 1863, Mira was the daughter of the painter Gregorio Mira Iñiguez and his wife Mercedes Mena Alviz. Raised in a well-to-do environment, she was introduced to painting by her father who had studied under the French painter Raymond Monvoisin, the first director of the Chilean School of Painting. She went on to study under the school's third director, Juan Mochi, at a time when it was quite unusual for women to undertake formal art studies.

In contrast to her sister, who specialized in portrait painting, Aurora Mira concentrated on still-lifes, especially flowers and fruit. Chilean society was even more taken aback when the two sisters began to exhibit in the salon of the Museum of Fine Arts in 1884 under José Manuel Balmaceda's presidency. Competing with such established artists as Pedro Lira, Juan Francisco González and Alfredo Valenzuela Puelma, Magdalena was awarded the Gold Medal while Aurora received the Silver Medal. Aurora Mira exhibited her paintings at the Salón Oficial from 1884 to 1897. Her works can be seen in the collections of Chile's Museo Nacional de Bellas Artes, the Museo de Arte y Artesanía de Linares and the Pinacoteca Banco de Chile, Santiago.

Aurora Mira died in 1939 in Santiago.

== See also ==
- Agustina Gutiérrez Salazar (1851 – 1886)
- Celia Castro (1860 – 1930)
