= Alberto Valenzuela Llanos =

Chilean painter (1869–1925)

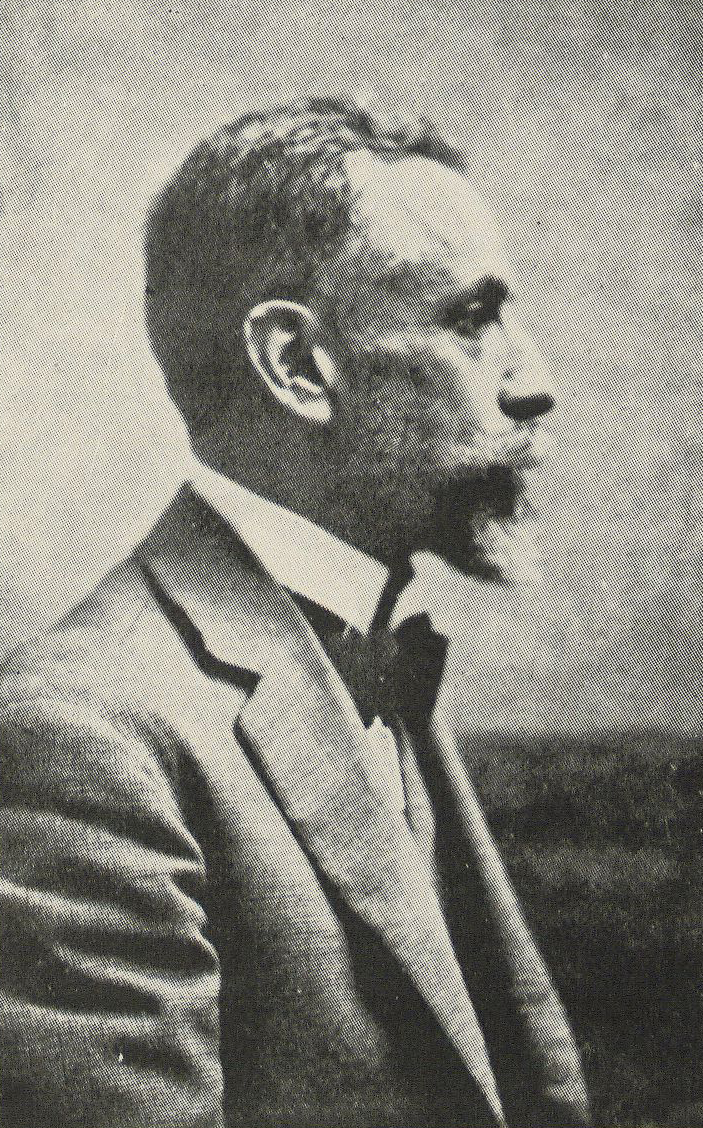
- Llanos in 1920
- Born: Ramon Alberto Valenzuela Llanos; August 29, 1869; San Fernando, Chile
- Died: July 23, 1925 (aged 55); Santiago, Chile
- Known for: Painting
- Movement: Grandes Maestros de la pintura Chilena (Great Masters of the Chilean Painting).

Alberto Valenzuela Llanos (August 29, 1869 – July 23, 1925) was a Chilean painter. He is among the Chile's greatest painters and one of the four Great Chilean Masters, along with Pedro Lira, Alfredo Valenzuela Puelma and Juan Francisco González. He was a landscape painter and left an estimated 1,000 paintings. Highlights of his work include paintings of the snow-topped mountains in France and views of Paris.

He was a pupil of the Chilean artists Cosme San Martín and Juan Mochi, both directors of the Chilean National Museum of Fine Arts in Santiago, Chile, with Mochi having the greatest influence on his work. He was also taught by the Chilean romantic painter Onofre Jarpa.

== Biography ==
Valenzuela Llanos was born on August 29, 1869 in the city of San Fernando. He was the son of a formerly wealthy family in decline - his parents, Florencia Valenzuela Llanos and Ricardo Lira, were cousins who belonged to a family with a long landowning and military tradition, where intermarriage was common. No explicit records remain to explain why the family was gradually falling into poverty. In his youth, Valenzuela Llanos was always interested in nature and enjoyed strolling through the grounds and admiring the countryside. He often made sketches of trees and colours and was known as respectable young gentleman.

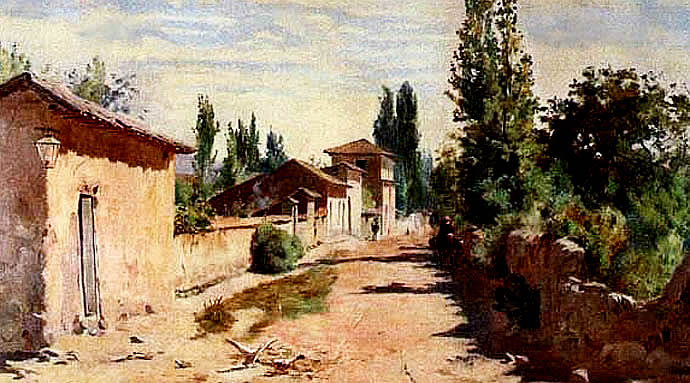
Chilean Countryside

He studied at public school and went to high school at a liceo (a public high school specialising in sciences and humanities). As the financial situation of his family got steadily worse, the young Alberto decided to work in the local textile store. He felt trapped in that environment but tried to accept his fate, knowing his family situation. At the age of 17, bored during a quiet day at the shop, he started drawing lilies on a piece of fabric. The store owner saw the drawings and, annoyed but impressed, showed the ruined fabric to the boy's father.

His father was amazed at Alberto's talent and decided that the boy was born to be an artist. He managed to convince his brother to let his son live in his house in the Chilean capital, Santiago so he could study simultaneously at the Instituto Nacional General José Miguel Carrera and the Academy of Painting (Santiago, Chile). Luckily for Alberto, the new director of the Academia was Juan Mochi, who, unlike the previous directors, tried to encourage his students to develop a unique style and did not care if they used unconventional artistic techniques. This enabled Valenzuela to dedicate the rest of life and career to painting the subject he loved most: landscapes.

He produced textured, subtle and simple landscapes using pinks and greens. His paintings of the spring are a faithful record of the morning light. The size of his canvases is particularly notable and is well above the average for the period. Experience of financial difficulties taught him to produce many paintings in a short time, so his work ended up being widely distributed around Chile. He liked to portray landscapes of everyday life in the capital city and began with Lo Contador (now Pedro de Valdivia Norte street in Providencia), the mountains of the Cajón del Maipo to the south of Santiago, and the coast of Algarrobo.

His personality was calm and serene and his main hobby was painting with oils. He never felt influenced by the bohemian atmosphere of the time, keeping his distance from political conflicts, and was always concerned about the welfare of his parents, siblings and friends in his hometown, taking the train to Colchagua whenever he had the chance to visit his relatives.

His painting evolved quickly thanks to the direction of Mochi and he began specializing in oil painting and using more and more sketches, drawing designs before starting on the painting itself. Most importantly, he was able to develop a personal style, the product of need and of effort. This earned him early recognition, and in 1889 he gained a place in the "Salon official de Santiago" (the official Santiago salon or exhibition hall). The following year he won a bronze medal at the annual salon contest, with more awards and recognition following quickly afterwards: in 1890, one of his paintings was featured in the Salon de peinture et de sculpture in Paris, something that few Latin American artists had achieved. Then, in 1891, he won an award at an exhibition in the United States and the Chilean government gave him a scholarship to study in Paris in exchange for some years of teaching .

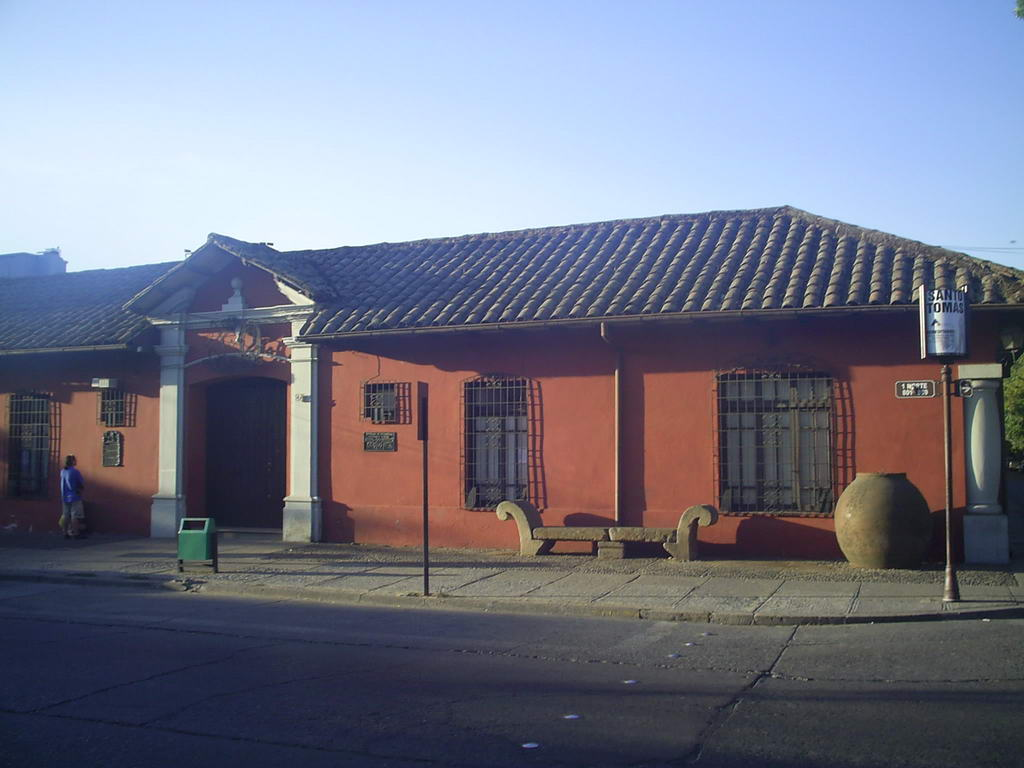
O'Higgins Fine Arts Museum, Talca, Chile

With no hesitation, he accepted the scholarship and went to France to study with Jean-Paul Laurens, who had taught other Chilean painters such as Alberto Orrego Luco and Alfredo Valenzuela Puelma, in the Académie Julian. There, he learned about impressionism and expressionism and had an extremely productive period, producing many paintings of Paris at dawn. In 1913, his efforts would win him an award at the Salon de peinture et de sculpture in 1913.

Thanks to the support of the Chilean government, he was able to travel regularly throughout Europe between 1901 and 1906, giving him the chance to visit Spain, Italy and England as well as France, where he continued to study.

Finally, in 1906, he returned home to Chile and was hired to teach drawing at the Liceo Miguel Luis Amunátegui high school in Santiago. In 1910, he married Julia Montero, a young student. After that he was hired to succeed Fernando Alvarez de Sotomayor y Zaragoza as professor of painting at the School of Fine Arts, where he taught for a couple of years.

He taught his students in the same way he was taught himself, trying to encourage them to develop their own style. He was beloved by his students and pushed them to walk around Santiago and visit the most famous places.

He died in Santiago on July 23, 1925. Currently, most of his paintings are in private collections, but some of his most famous works are in the Chilean National Museum of Fine Arts, the Central Bank of Chile, the Casa del Arte in Concepción and the O'Higgins Fine Arts Museum in Talca.

== Awards and distinctions ==
- 1894 Edwards award price, Exposición Nacional Artística (National Art Exhibition), Santiago, Chile
- 1895 General Marcos Maturana Price, Exposición Nacional Artística, Santiago, Chile
- 1895 Medalla de Primera Clase en Paisaje, National Art Exhibition, Santiago, Chile
- 1896 General Maturana award, National Art Exhibition, Santiago, Chile
- 1897 Edwards award price, National Art Exhibition, Santiago, Chile
- 1900 Edwards award price, Salón Oficial (the official hall), Santiago, Chile
- 1901 Honourable mention, Buffalo exhibition, United States
- 1903 Medal of Honor, Salón Oficial (the official hall), Santiago, Chile
- 1904 General Marcos Maturana award, Salón Oficial (the official hall), Santiago, Chile
- 1910 Gold Medal, Santiago International Exhibition, Museo Nacional de Bellas Artes, Santiago, Chile
- 1910 Silver Medal, Buenos Aires exhibit, Argentina
- 1912 General Maturana Price, Salón Oficial (the official hall), Santiago, Chile
- 1912 Medal of the Society of French Artists, París hall, France
- 1913 Second place medal, Salon (Paris), France
- 1914 Silver Medal, Edwards award, Salón Oficial (the official hall), Santiago, Chile
- 1920 Public Instruction Officer, given by the French government in recognition to his merit
- 1923 Chevalier (Knight) cross Legion of Honour given by the French government in recognition to his merit
- 1924 It was awarded a place as member of the Society French Artist.

== Selected works ==
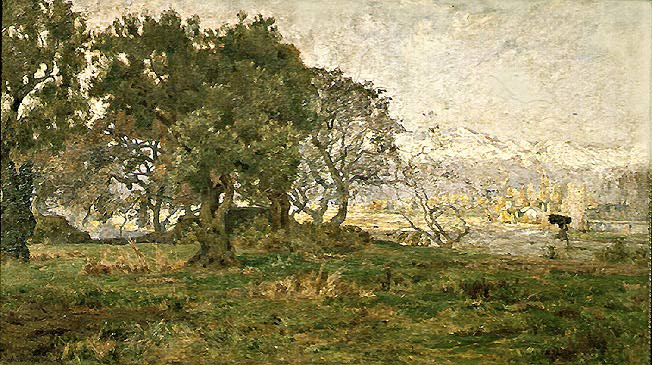
Landscape of Lo Contador

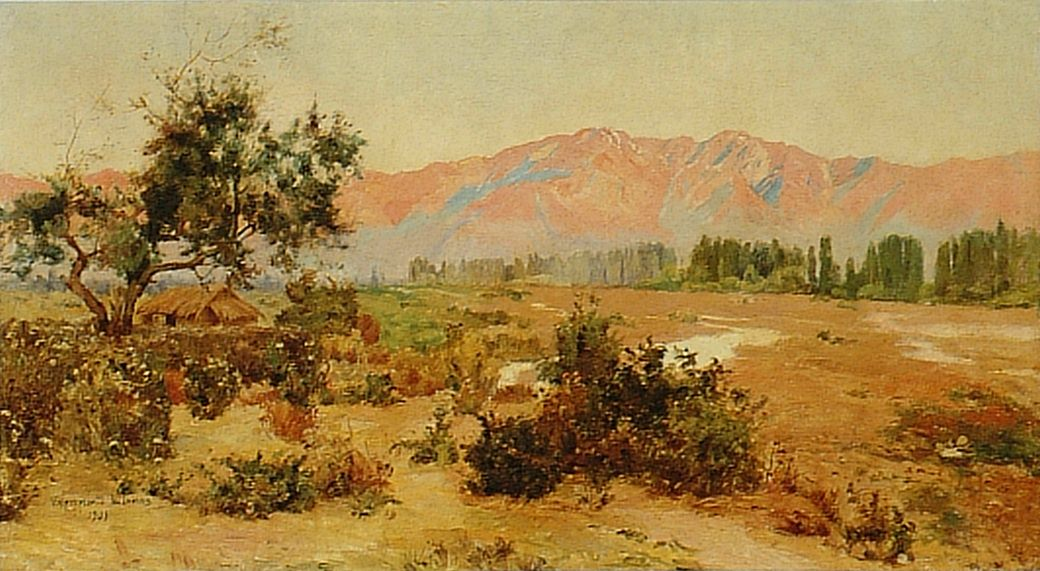
Landscape with Mountain Range

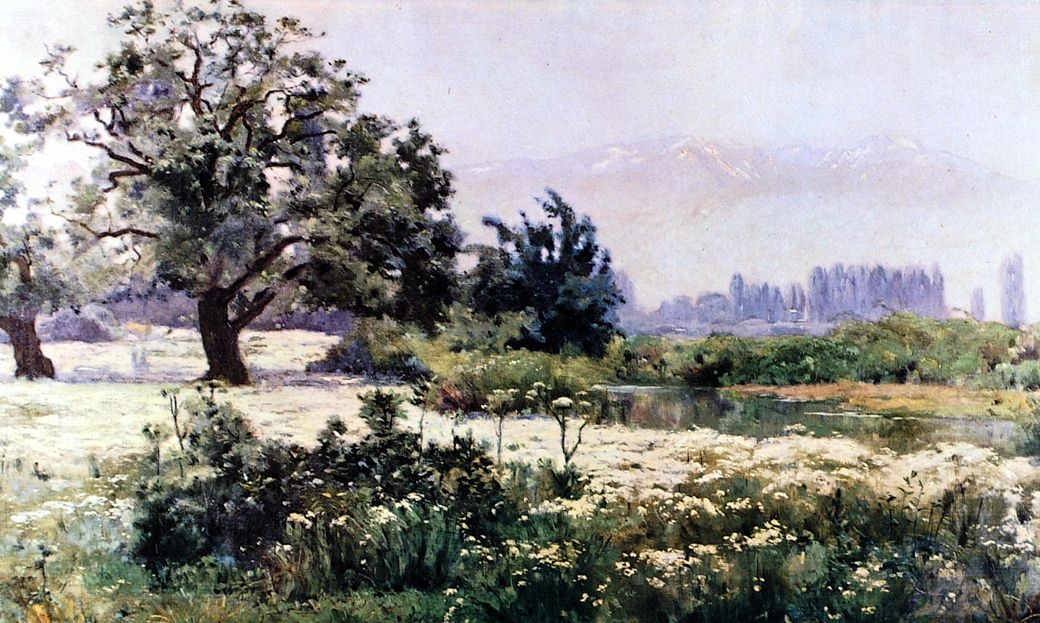
Landscape with Apple Trees

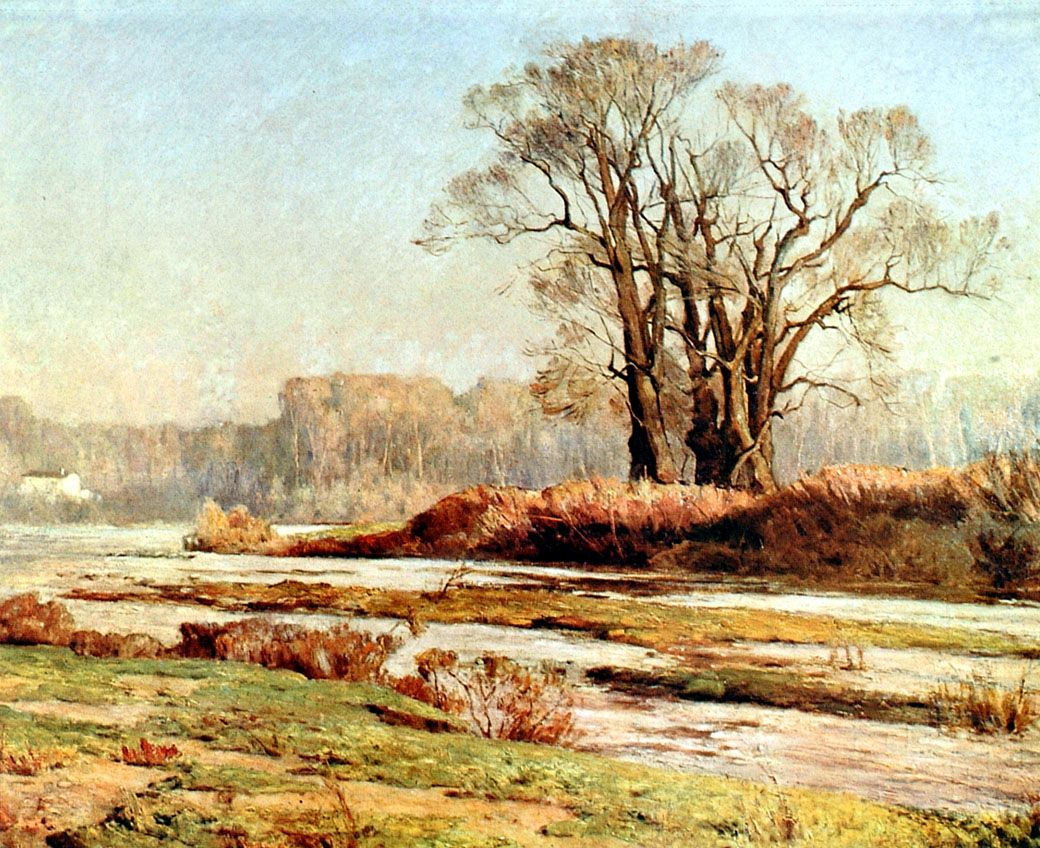
Riberas del Mapocho

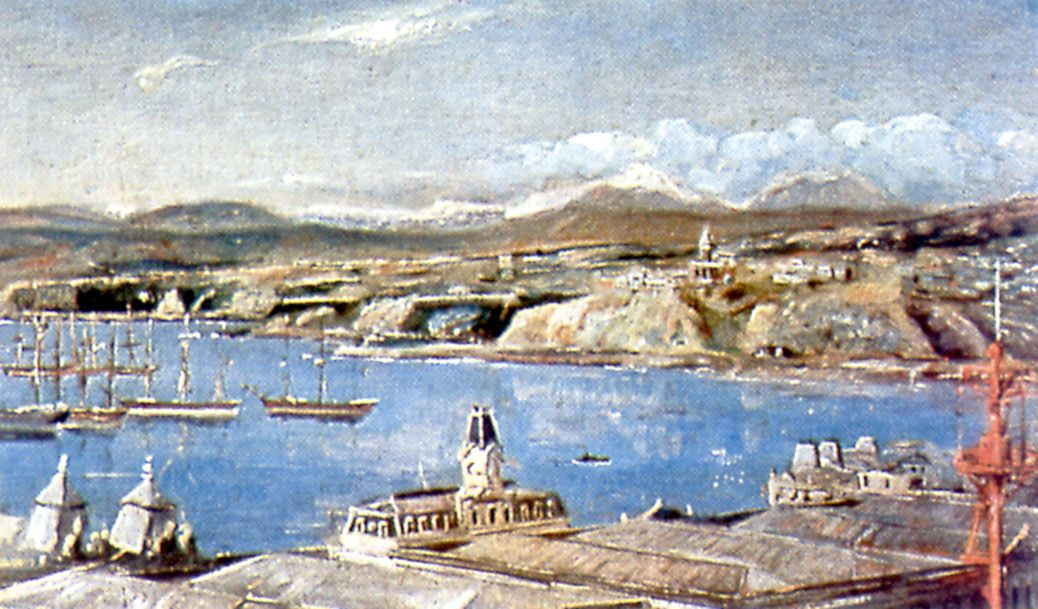
Valparaíso in 1895

== See also ==
- Pablo Burchard
- Pedro Lira Rencoret

== Bibliography ==
- Valenzuela González, Alvaro. 1968. 'Historia de la Sociedad Científica de Valparaíso', Anales del Museo de Historia Natural de Valparaiso (1): 27–47.
- ÁLVAREZ URQUIETA, LUIS.
  - La pintura en Chile : colección Luis Alvarez Urquieta, 1928 Text in Spanish
  - La pintura en Chile durante el período Colonial, 1933. Text in Spanish
  - El artista pintor José Gil de Castro, 1934. Text In Spanish
  - Alvarez Uriquieta, Luis. 1928. La Pintura en Chile. Santiago de Chile: Imprenta la Ilustración. Conservación, restauración y estudios artísticos, Historia del Arte.
- ROMERA R., ANTONIO, Historia de la pintura chilena, 1951. Text In Spanish
- Galaz, Gaspar AND Milán Ivelic, La pintura en Chile : desde la Colonia hasta 1981, 1981 Text in Spanish
- Galaz, Gaspar and Milan Ivelic. 1981. La Pintura en Chile desde la Colonia hasta 1981. Valparaíso: Universidad Católica de Valparaíso, Ediciones Universitarias. Museo Nacional de Bellas Artes.
