= Agustina Gutiérrez Salazar =

Chilean artist (1851–1886)

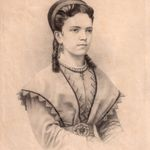
- Born: 1851; San Fernando (Chile)
- Died: September 4, 1886 (35 years old); Santiago of Chile
- Resting place: Santiago of Chile
- Education: Painting Academy
- Known for: The first teacher in her country The first of plastic arts in her country
- Movement: Realism and pencil drawing
- Awards: 1884 Honorable Mention in Painting, Salon 1884, Santiago of Chile
- Patrons: Alejandro Cicarelli

Agustina Gutiérrez Salazar (San Fernando, 1851 - Santiago, Chile, September 4, 1886) was a Chilean painter and draftsman. She was the first student of the Painting Academy and the first teacher of plastic arts in her country. She obtained an important public recognition for her work as a portraitist of women of the high society of Valparaíso, according to what was reflected in the press of his time.

== Family and studies ==
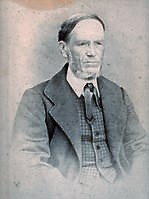
Her father José Antonio Gutiérrez Gutiérrez

She was the daughter of José Antonio Gutiérrez Gutiérrez, born in the city of San Fernando, in the province of Colchagua, in the middle of a middle-class family, where her artistic gifts stood out as a child.

At age 15 she moved to Santiago with his father. She joined the Painting Academy in 1866.

She is considered the first woman who drives feminine art. In 1869, she was appointed by Alejandro Ciccarelli and, therefore, by the state of Chile, professor of drawing at the Painting Academy; She was 18 years old. This fact made her the first drawing teacher in Chile, being one of the initiators of this discipline as a teacher in the state school.

== Art ==
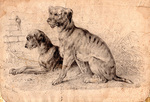
Charcoal drawing of dogs

She was one of the pioneer women to participate in the Painting Salons of Santiago. His talent was highlighted by oil painting on canvas, mainly on motifs about mythological legends, animals, epic themes, still lifes, flowers and varied compositions.

He also stood out as a pencil portraitist. With this technique it is estimated that he made more than two thousand portraits on paper. Among these portraits, the ladies of Valparaíso stand out: Juana Vargas de Jara Quemada, Carmela Mena de Veras, Marcelina Vargas de Mena, Acasia Lazo de Undurraga and the Royal Lady of Azúa. The portraits received a psychological character and nuances. He made a profession of his artistic work, like any other of the students of the Academy, being a work that allowed him to have his income to cover his needs, which for his time, moved him away from the leisure pattern; This was socially linked to women. You could see the learning of art, also French and music, as complements of their high education and culture.

Thus, his work was a reflection of the Chilean social context, especially the portraits of ladies of the high society of the time. His five sisters also cultivated the painting.

In the inauguration speech of the Academy of Painting in the year of 1849, where Alejandro Ciccarelli pointed out that:

I want to call the attention of the studious Chilean youth, to observe him, that the country opens a new career that assures him a new social position. The race is vast, and although opposed to that of weapons, it is glorious like her. If the children of the country shed their blood on the battlefields to ensure their independence and greatness, the fine arts have the mission of fertilizing this seed of virtue and patriotism, illustrating through art the feats of these brave

She in her art can also make references to Paula Aldunate Larraín (1834-1871) who she was a disciple of Mauricio Rugendas.

== Death and legacy ==
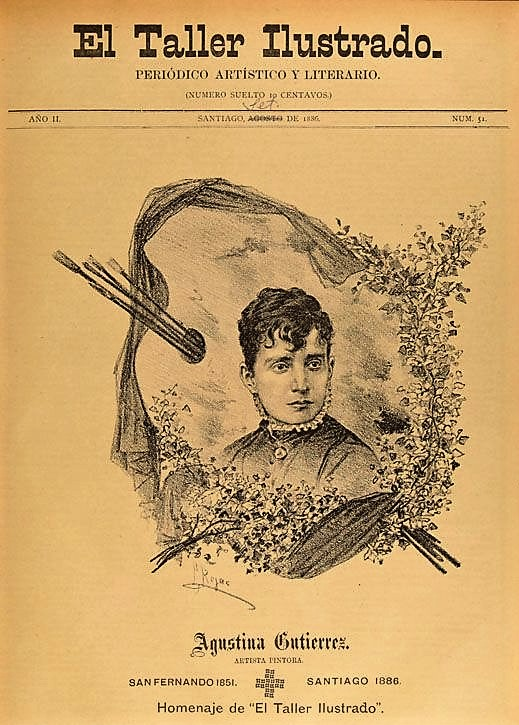
Tribute of the illustrated workshop N ° 51 to Agustina Gutiérrez Salazar

Agustina Gutiérrez was a victim of pneumonia of 35 years old, dying from this cause on September 4, 1886.

In number 51 of the cultural newspaper called The Illustrated Workshop, it is said of her:

She came to form a clientele, her oil and pencil portraits had the highest acceptance. Of the latter, a good number have been successful, particularly in Valparaíso, among which there are some outstanding merits, either as correction and purity of lines, or due to their artistic language modeled on the similarity of the original.

In the following paragraphs they indicate that:

She became known throughout the country for her artistic talent. People with great wealth and materially poor praised their work. His reputation was assured. His paintings were to be acquired naturally by the men of fortune

José Miguel Blanco says about her:

Let's honor your memory
Today that you enter the eternal to get up,
Your new future becomes glory
Your triumphant crown emerges from art

Agustina Gutiérrez participated in a single collective exhibition, which was the first exhibition of the Fifth Normal of the National Association of Agriculture, in Santiago of Chile, in 1884.

== Awards and distinctions ==
- 1884 Honorable Mention in Painting, Salon 1884, Santiago de Chile

== See also ==
- Aurora Mira Mena (1863 – 1939)
- Magdalena Mira Mena (1859 – 1930)
- Celia Castro (1860 – 1930)
