= Marcos Segundo Maturana =

Chilean military general and art collector

General Marcos Segundo Maturana Marcos Segundo Maturana
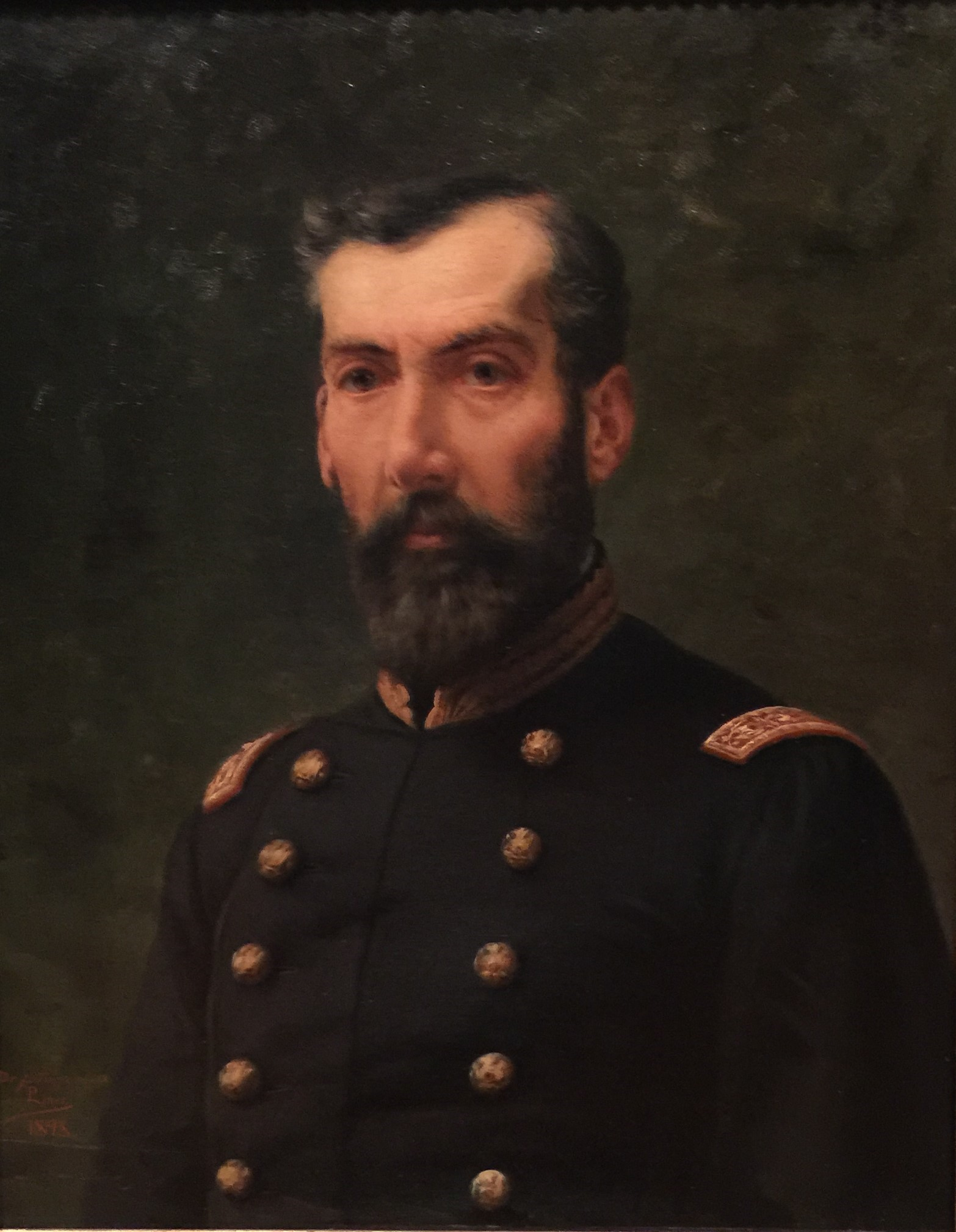
- Marcos Segundo Maturana; Oil on Canvas of Pedro Lira Rencoret
- Born: Marcos Segundo Maturana Molina; February 15, 1830; Santiago of Chile
- Died: May 18, 1892; Santiago of Chile
- Military career
- Allegiance: Chile
- Branch: Chilean's Army
- Service years: January 4, 1883 - July 23, 1889
- Rank: General of Chile
- Nickname: Maturana General
- Unit: Mayor General
- Commands: 1851 Chilean Revolution; War of the Pacific
- Conflicts: Urriola Mutiny; Battle of Miraflores; Battle of San Juan and Chorrillos

Marcos Segundo Maturana Molina (February 15, 1830 – May 18, 1892) was a Chilean military and art collector. Given his service in the War of the Pacific against Peru and Bolivia, he is regarded a war hero by the Chilean army. Maturana is also known for founding the National Museum of Paintings of Santiago, currently known as the National Museum of Fine Arts of Santiago de Chile.

== Personal life ==
He was the eldest son of independence era general Marcos Maturana del Campo and Francisca Molinas Berben. He studied at the Núñez School in Santiago, Chile.

== Military career ==
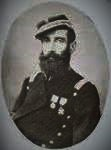
Marcos Maturana Molina in the War of the Pacific

On September 18, 1848, he was awarded the rank of sub-lieutenant of artillery. On April 20, 1851, in the so-called Urriola mutiny he defended the headquarters of Artillery of Santiago, under the orders of his father. In this case, he was seriously injured in the chest. For his conduct in these events, he was granted the ascent of captain, and later, in 1854, he was promoted to sergeant major.

In 1858, he had health problems and in 1861 he rejoined the army. In October of that year he was appointed first assistant of the General Inspection of the National Guard and in 1862 he became a lieutenant colonel.

On September 25, 1865, he assumed as Commander of Arms of the Constitution and later on November 16 he was appointed Governor of the Constitution and participated in the war against Spain, defending the coast of the province of Talca.

On February 28, 1866, he assumed as commander and organizer of the 11th Line Battalion and participated in the Araucanía campaigns.

July 12, 1867 he was appointed by President José Joaquín Pérez, his Aide-de-camp. Later in 1869 he was Aide-de-camp of President Federico Errázuriz Zañartu and before the War of the Pacific he was Aide-de-camp of President Aníbal Pinto Garmendia.

In 1868, he was a member of the Commission that repatriated the remains of the father of the Chilean homeland, General Bernardo O'Higgins.

May 15, 1879, he was appointed General Director of the Maestranza and Artillery Park and on October 1, of the same year he was appointed Commander of the forts and batteries of Valparaíso. Shortly after he resumed command of the Maestranza de Santiago and it was his responsibility to quell the fire that occurred in these facilities on January 27, 1880.

== War of the Pacific ==
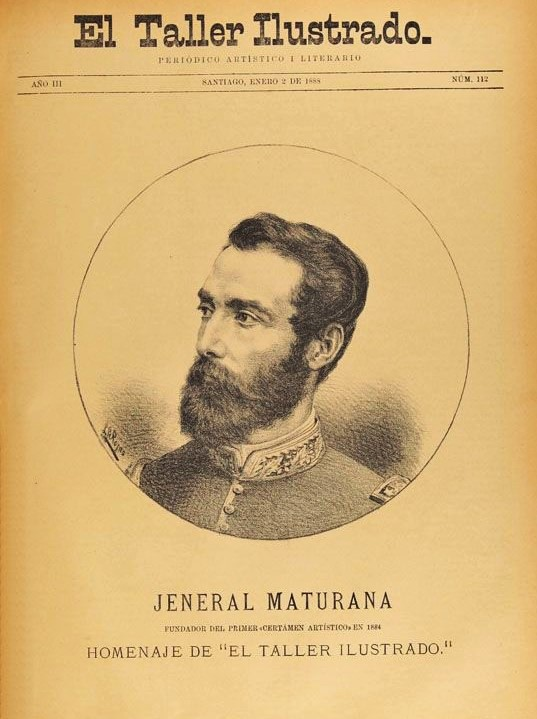
Tribute to Marcos Segundo Maturana in the Illustrated Workshop

The war of the Pacific began and on August 27, 1880, he was promoted to brigadier general. On September 29 of the same year he obtained the appointment of Chief of the General Staff, rank with which he participated in this war.

He was with José Francisco Vergara, where they participated in the battles of Chorrillos and Miraflores on January 13 and 15, 1881.

In 1881, he returned to Chile and returned again to the direction of the Maestranza. On June 14 of the same year he was appointed Commander of the forts and batteries of Valparaíso and on July 31, 1881, he organized the National Museum of Paintings of Santiago, currently known as the National Museum of Fine Arts of Santiago de Chile.

On January 4, 1883, he ascended to General of Division and in 1889, on July 23, he retired from the Chilean army.

== Legacy ==
Maturana General for years he dedicated himself to the acquisition of works of art such as ancient weapons, Inca archeological pieces, European porcelain, cologne items and paintings of different Chilean and foreign painters.
On July 31, 1880, together with the Florentine Juan Mochi, the sculptor José Miguel Blanco and the young painter Enrique Swinburn Kirk, the beginnings of the National Museum of Paintings, which had been formed with 140 works of art. This museum was inaugurated on September 18, 1880, becoming part of the Chilean patriotic festivities of this year.

He was a brave soldier with natural ability. He had served in the campaigns in which he participated, excelling in the war actions of 1851 and 1880, which made him ascend rapidly on the military staircase; this allowed him to occupy important military positions.

== See also ==
- Juan Albano Pereira Márquez
- José Miguel Carrera
- Juan Mackenna
- Pedro Lira Rencoret
- Alfredo Valenzuela Puelma
- Álvaro Casanova Zenteno
- Eugenio Cruz Vargas
