= Celia Castro =

Chilean artist (1860–1930)

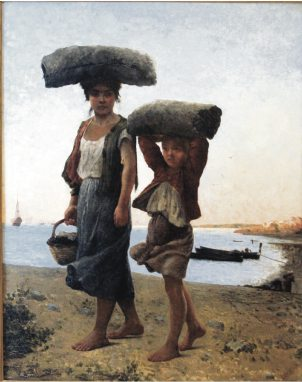
Women on the Beach

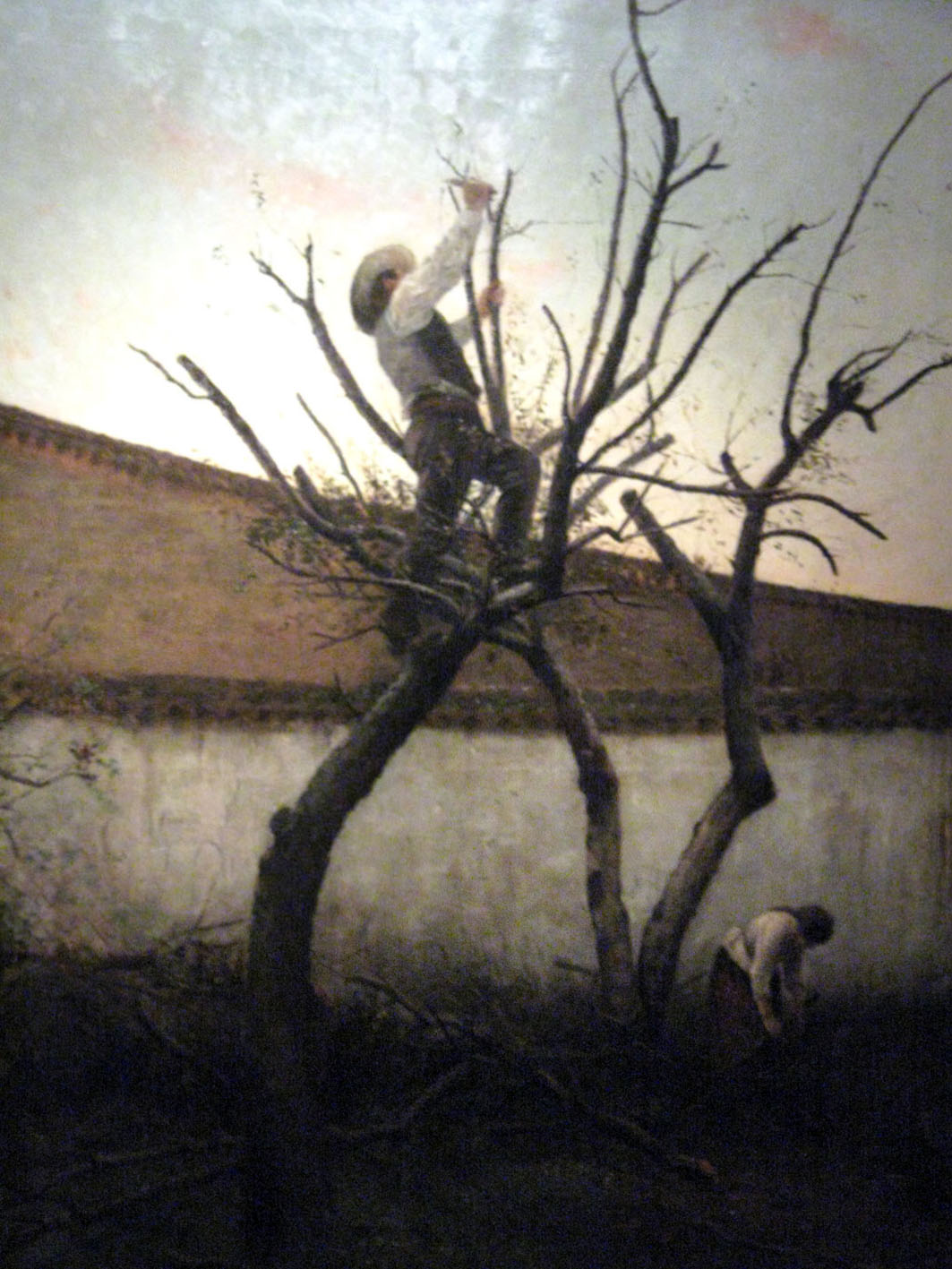
The Pruning

Celia Castro (1860, Valparaíso – 19 June 1930, Valparaíso) was a Chilean visual artist. Her style is generally associated with Realism.

== Biography ==
Castro's artistic career was inspired from a meeting with the painter Manuel Antonio Caro who, after seeing her work, recommended she go to Santiago to study at the Academia de Pintura (es). She followed his advice and became a student of Pedro Lira. Her first exhibition came in 1884, where she presented one of her best-known works, "Las Playeras" (Women on the Beach). In 1889, it won an award and was acquired by the Chilean National Museum of Fine Arts.

Thanks to this recognition, Castro was able to go to Paris to refine her technique. She was especially fond of painting the city's streets and corners. On her return, these new works prompted the government to give her a study grant and she went back to Europe in 1904. She was the first woman to receive such a grant. During this visit, her brushwork became more precise. It was then she created her second best-known work, "La Poda" (The Pruning).

Castro eventually won praise from Parisian critics and exhibited frequently at the Salon. She returned to Chile in 1927 and died three years later, having paved the way for other female artists such as Rebeca Matte, the Mira sisters, Aurora and Magdalena.

"La Poda" was later honored at a special exhibition at the University of Concepción, as part of an event relating to deforestation in Bío Bío.
