= Alfredo Helsby =

Chilean painter

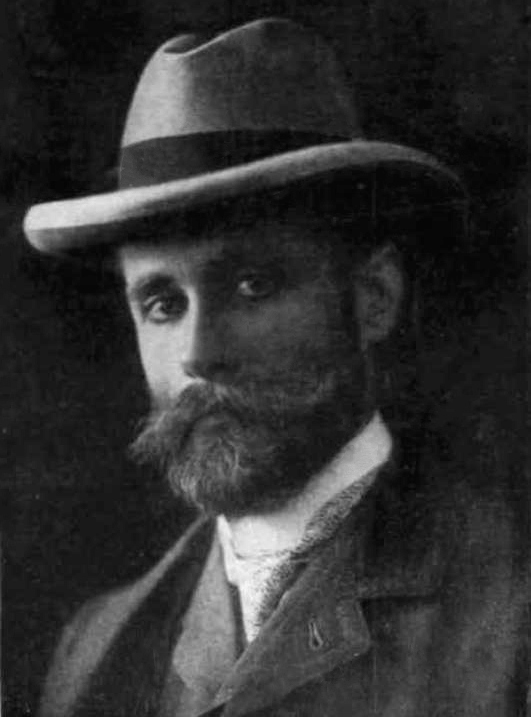
Helsby in 1905

Alfredo Helsby Hazell (22 July 1862, Valparaíso – 24 July 1933, Santiago de Chile) was a Chilean landscape painter of English ancestry. He was also an avid promoter of what is now known as alternative medicine.

== Biography ==
He was the son of Thomas Columbus Helsby (1822–1872), who had come to Valparaíso in 1853 to join his younger brother, William George (1828–1891), the owner of a daguerreotype studio. At the age of eight, following a tuberculosis vaccination, he developed complications that led to a severe case of pneumonia. As a result, he had a lifelong interest in medical issues.

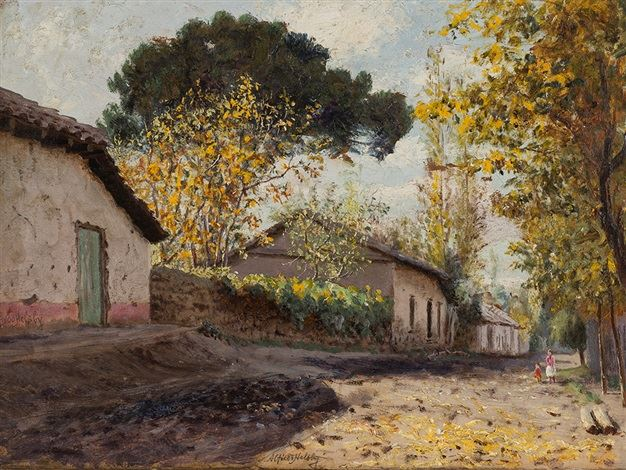
Village View

He studied at The Mackay School, where his art teacher was the British painter, Thomas Somerscales, who stressed the importance of painting landscapes en plein aire. Later, he studied at the Academy of Painting (Santiago, Chile), under the direction of Alfredo Valenzuela Puelma, whose teaching tended more toward Academicism.

His influence on Helsby went beyond painting, as both shared an interest in "alternative medicine"; seeking a way to cure diseases without surgery or drugs. Valenzuela would sometimes introduce himself as "doctor", and an apocryphal story has him giving a lecture at the Sorbonne.

In 1906, thanks to a grant from the Chilean government, he was able to study in Europe. He chose to settle in Paris, where he took lessons from Jean Paul Laurens. In cooperation with Valenzuela, he also engaged in efforts to promote Chilean art; organizing exhibitions in Paris and London. In 1907, he had his first personal exhibitions there at the Salon and the Royal Academy.

During his stay there, he became affiliated with the National Anti-Vaccination League and the National Anti-Vivisection Society. For the rest of his life, he wrote letters to local newspapers, condemning vaccination and animal experimentation, and praising naturopathic medicine. In 1911, he wrote Contra la vacunación obligatoria... (Against mandatory vaccination), dedicated to Georgina Hooper de Hammerton, a Chilean Theosophist who was also of English ancestry.

He returned to Chile in 1908, on the same ship carrying Fernando Álvarez de Sotomayor, the artist who would inspire the members of Generación del 13, and they became close friends. On that voyage home, he passed through Brazil and Argentina, which prompted him to hold a major exhibition in Buenos Aires soon after. From 1914 to 1919, he lived in several cities in the United States, including San Francisco, New Orleans, and Washington. He also spent some time with John Joseph Enneking, who was terminally ill. Later, he made new study trips, to Argentina (1920) and Europe (1920–1921).

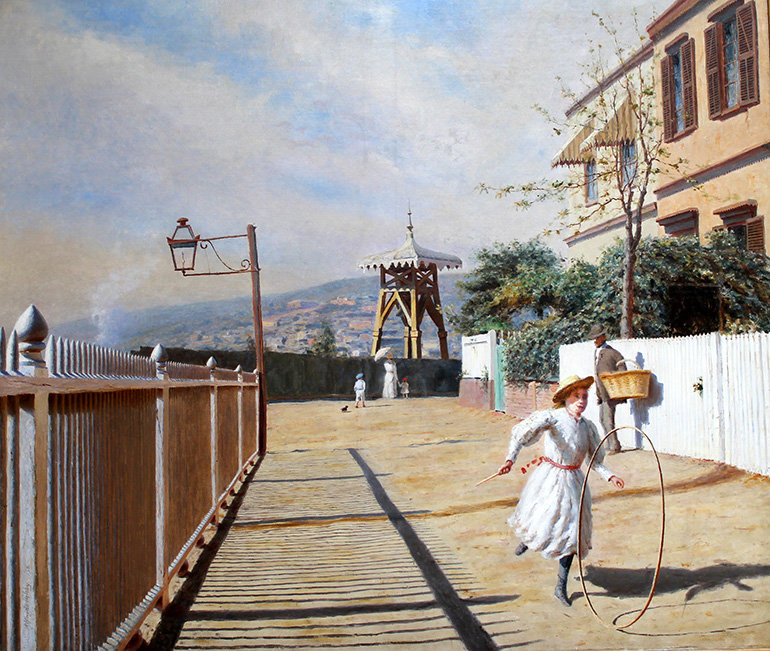
The Paseo Atkinson, Valparaíso

Of a solitary disposition, he spent his final years alone (with his cat), in a small house in a thinly-populated area of La Cisterna, on the south side of Santiago. He died at the age of seventy-one, from an intestinal disorder. He had refused to accept any medical care.
