= Alfredo Valenzuela Puelma =

Chilean painter (1856–1909)

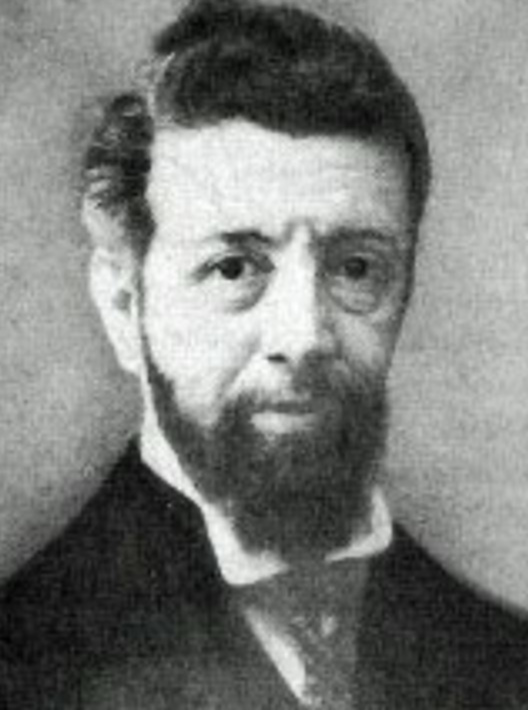
- Born: Alfredo Valenzuela Puelma; 8 February 1856; Valparaíso, Chile
- Died: 27 October 1909 (aged 53); Villejuif, France
- Known for: Painting
- Notable work: Ninfa de las cerezas La perla del mercader La sevillana
- Movement: Realist
- Awards: 1877 — First place, Salón Oficial, Santiago, Chile; 1878 - First and second place, Salón Oficial, Santiago, Chile;

Alfredo Valenzuela Puelma (8 February 1856 – 27 October 1909) was one of Chile's best-known painters and one of the four artists known as the Great Chilean Masters.

== Biography ==
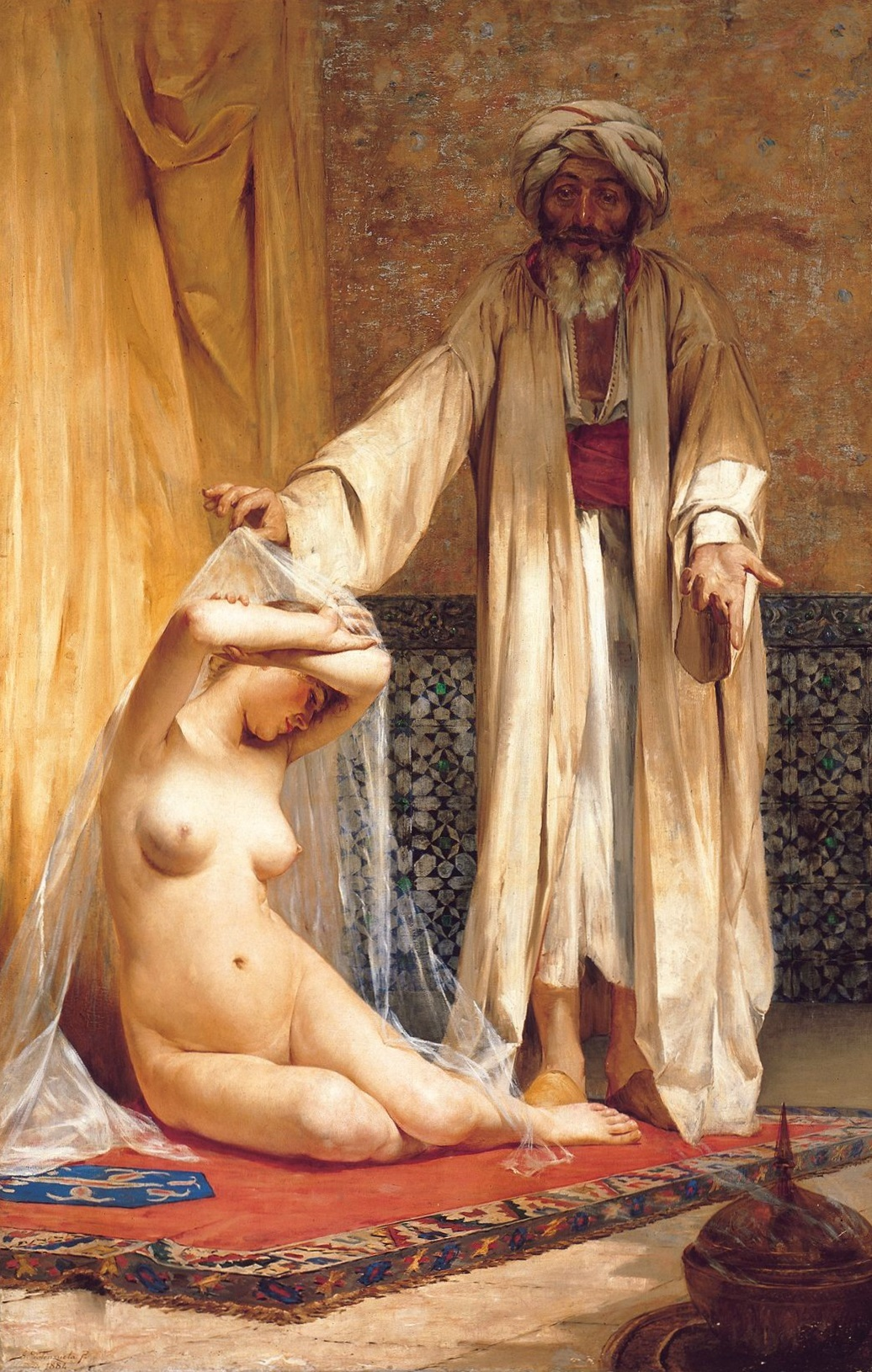
The Merchant's Pearl (1884), one of his best known works

He was born in Valparaíso. He showed a talent and interest in art from an early age. At the age of twelve, he began attending the Academy of Painting (Santiago, Chile) where he learned from Ernesto Kirchbach and Juan Mochi. For the first few years he combined artistic training with the study of medicine.

Between 1881 and 1885 he was awarded a scholarship from the Chilean Government to continue his art studies at the workshop of Benjamin-Constant in Paris. He also took courses in anatomy at the Sorbonne, where he made contact with movements that would go on to revolutionise art history, like the Manet School. However, it was the work of the Spanish masters that he copied at the Louvre that made the deepest impression on him, and were more of an influence on his style.

In 1887, for the second time, he won a scholarship to study in Paris this time attended the workshop of Jean Paul Laurens. Whilst studying in France and upon his return to Chile, he submitted his works to be included in most art galleries and art contests in Santiago, and won awards on several occasions. During the last decade of the 19th century, when living in Valparaíso, he played an active role as an administrator at the Theater La Victoria, as well as managing art exhibitions.

He made his final trip to France in 1907 and never returned to Chile. He was suffering from persistent depression and mental illness that left him destitute and led ultimately to his death at the age of 53 in Villejuif. His remains were later repatriated to Chile and honored at a grand ceremony held in the main hall of the National Museum of Fine Arts.

Although he was not formally dedicated to teaching, his students included the painters Alfredo Helsby and Eucarpio Espinosa, among others, which is why critic and historian Antonio Romera includes him in the group of the Great Masters of Chilean painting.

He successfully developed a realist technique based on the canon of academic art. Throughout his productive career, he worked using oils and painted a very diverse range of subjects, such as landscapes, interiors, portraits, still lifes and especially nudes. These include La Perla del Mercader (The Merchant's Pearl), one of the most popular paintings in the Chilean art world. He is also known for his penchant for Arabic motifs, reflecting the influence of his teacher, Constant.

== Awards and distinctions ==
- 1877 - First place, Salón Oficial, Santiago, Chile.
- 1878 - First and second place, Salón Oficial, Santiago, Chile.
- 1880 - First place, Salón Oficial, Santiago, Chile.
- 1884 - First place, Salón Oficial, Santiago, Chile.
- 1889 - Honorable mention, Salon de Paris, France.
- 1890 - Third place, Salón de Otoño, Madrid, Spain.
- 1892 - Marcos Segundo Maturana Award, Salón Oficial, Santiago, Chile.
- 1892 - Edwards Award, Salón Oficial, Santiago, Chile.
- 1896 - First place, Exposición Municipal de Valparaíso, Chile.
- 1899 - Edwards Award, Salón Oficial, Santiago, Chile.
- 1901 - Third place, Buffalo Exhibition, United States.
- 1903 - Edwards Award, Salón Oficial, Santiago, Chile.
- 1929 - Third place, Ibero-American Exposition of 1929, Spain

== Selected of works ==
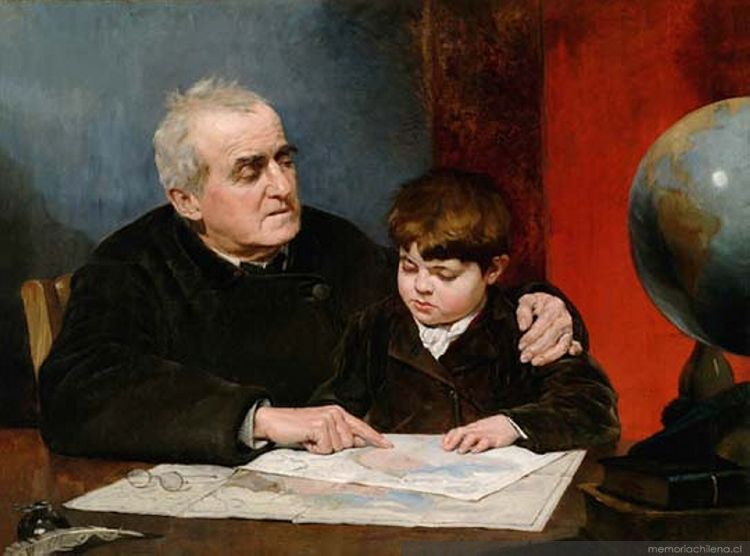
The Geography Lesson

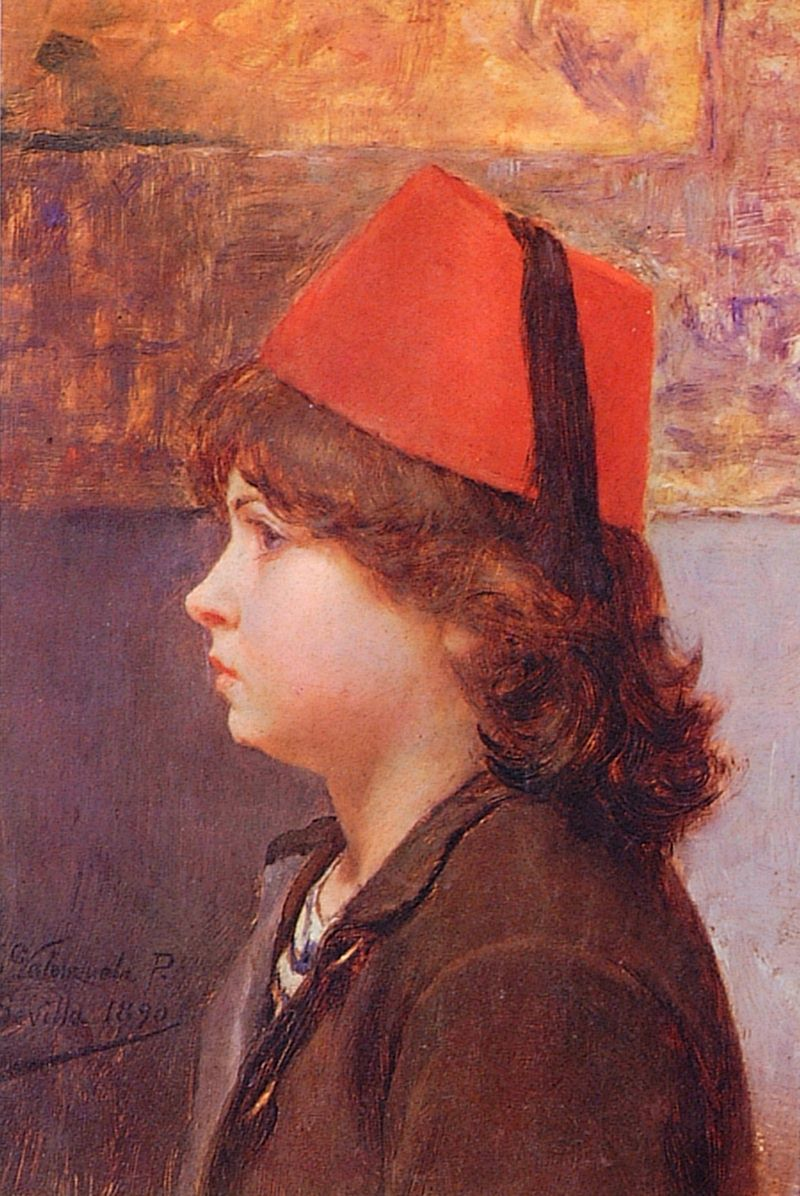
Fez Boy

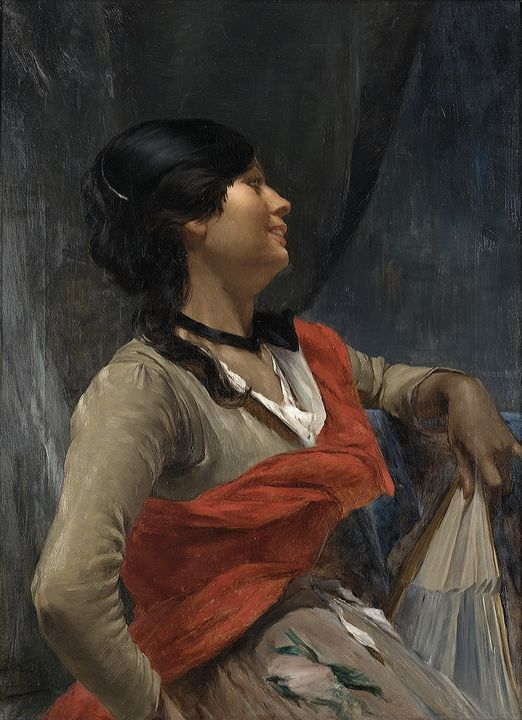
Sevillian Woman

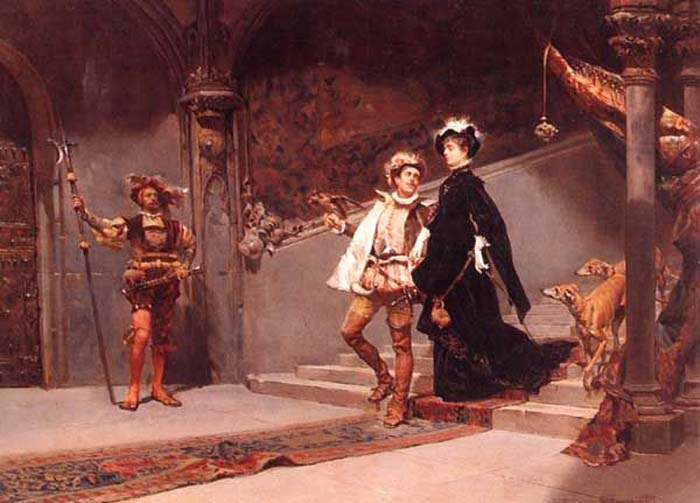
Going Hunting

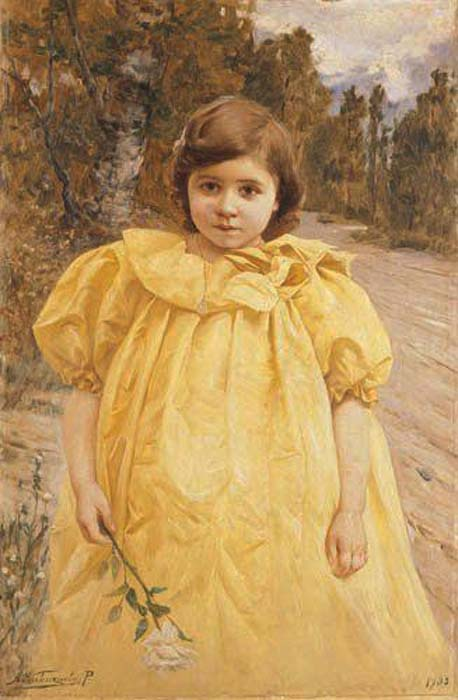
Girl in a Yellow Dress

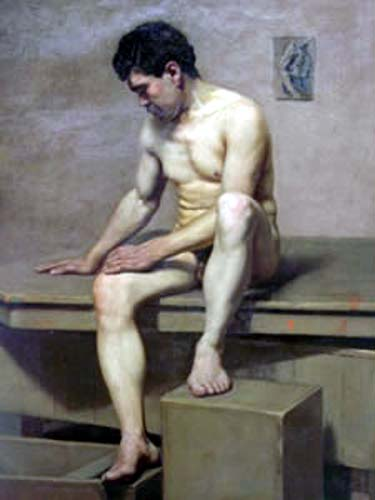
Male Nude

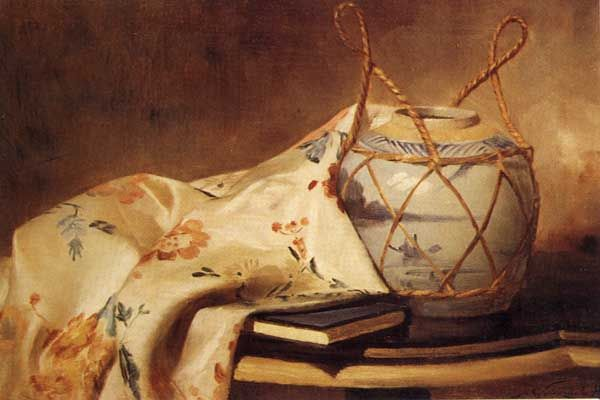
Sevillian Vase and Blanket

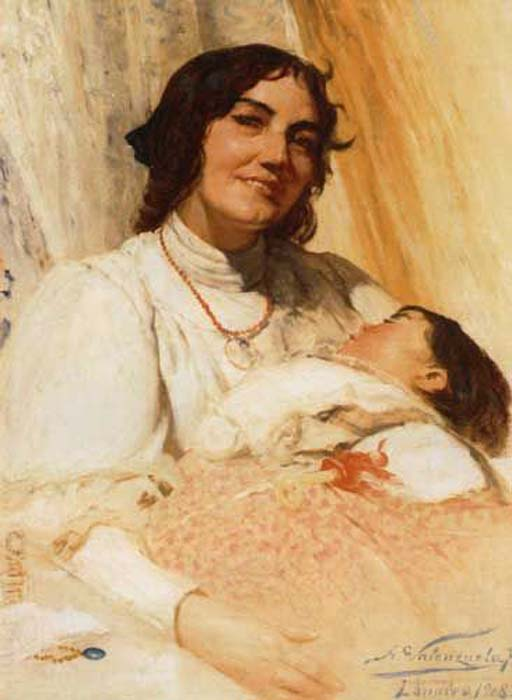
The Happy Mother

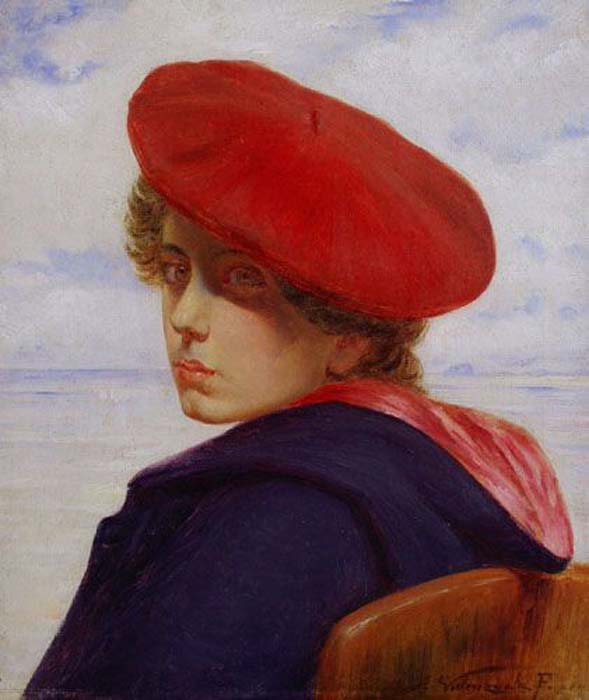
The Little Admiral

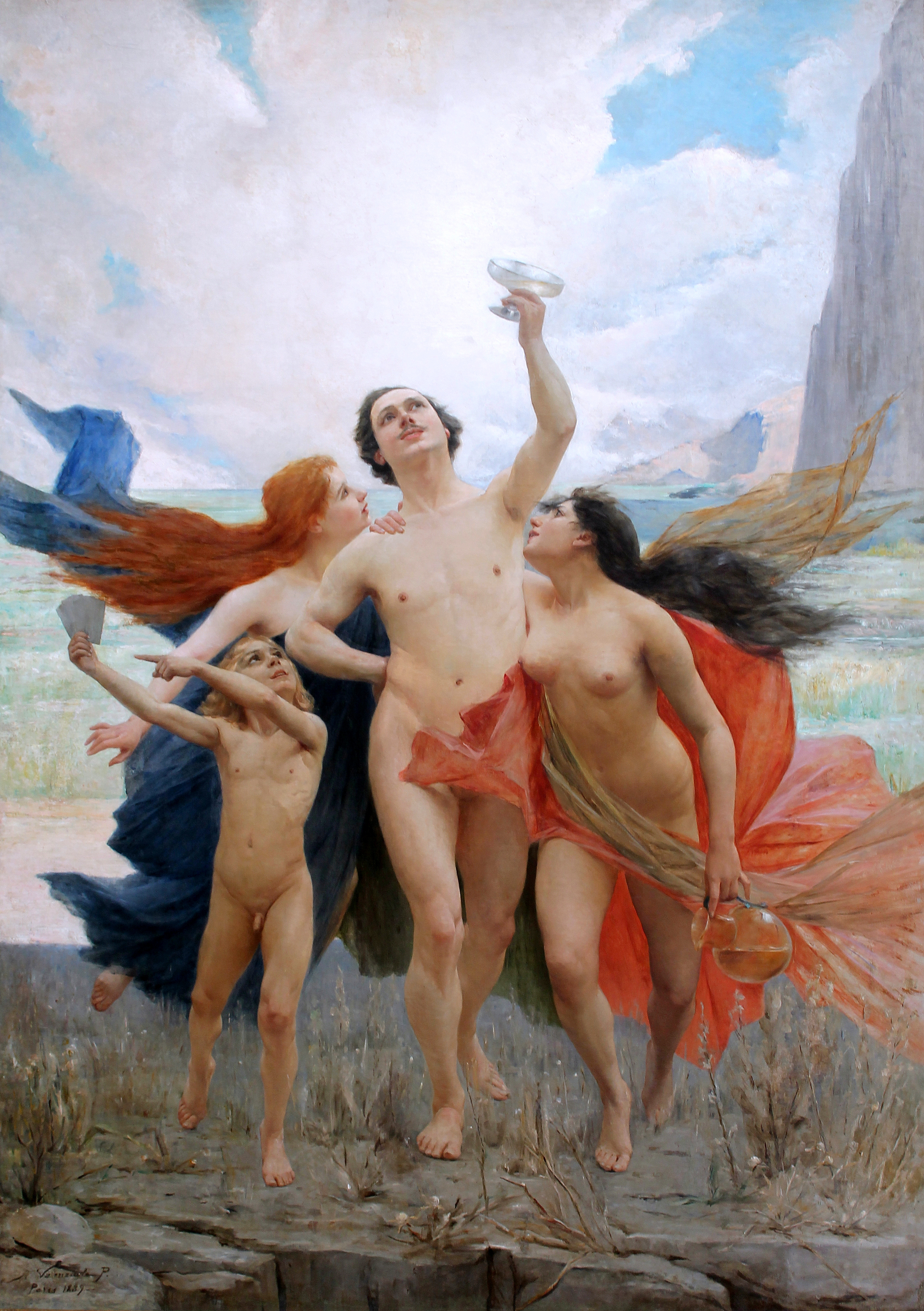
Youth Tempted by Vice

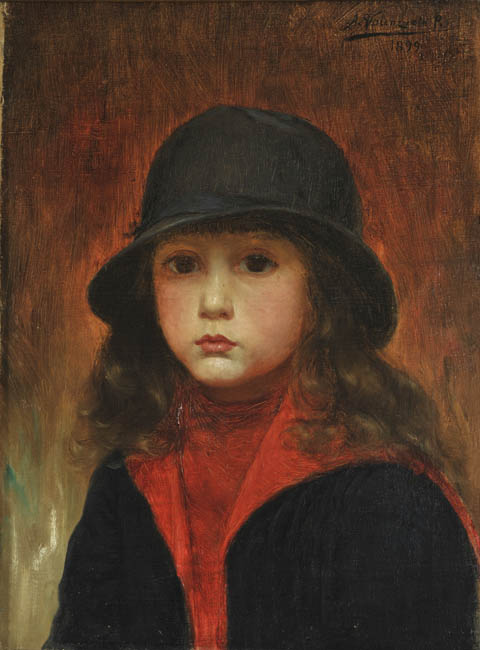
My Son Rafael

== See also ==
- Pablo Burchard
- Juan Francisco González
- Pedro Lira Rencoret
- Alberto Valenzuela Llanos
- Álvaro Casanova Zenteno

== Bibliography ==
- Alvarez Uriquieta, Luis. 1928. La Pintura en Chile. Santiago de Chile: Imprenta la Ilustración. Conservación, restauración y estudios artísticos, Historia del Arte.
- Galaz, Gaspar and Milan Ivelic. 1981. La Pintura en Chile desde la Colonia hasta 1981. Valparaíso: Universidad Católica de Valparaíso, Ediciones Universitarias. Museo Nacional de Bellas Artes.
- Valenzuela González, Alvaro. 1968. 'Historia de la Sociedad Científica de Valparaíso', Anales del Museo de Historia Natural de Valparaiso (1): 27–47.
