= Juan Mochi =

Italian painter

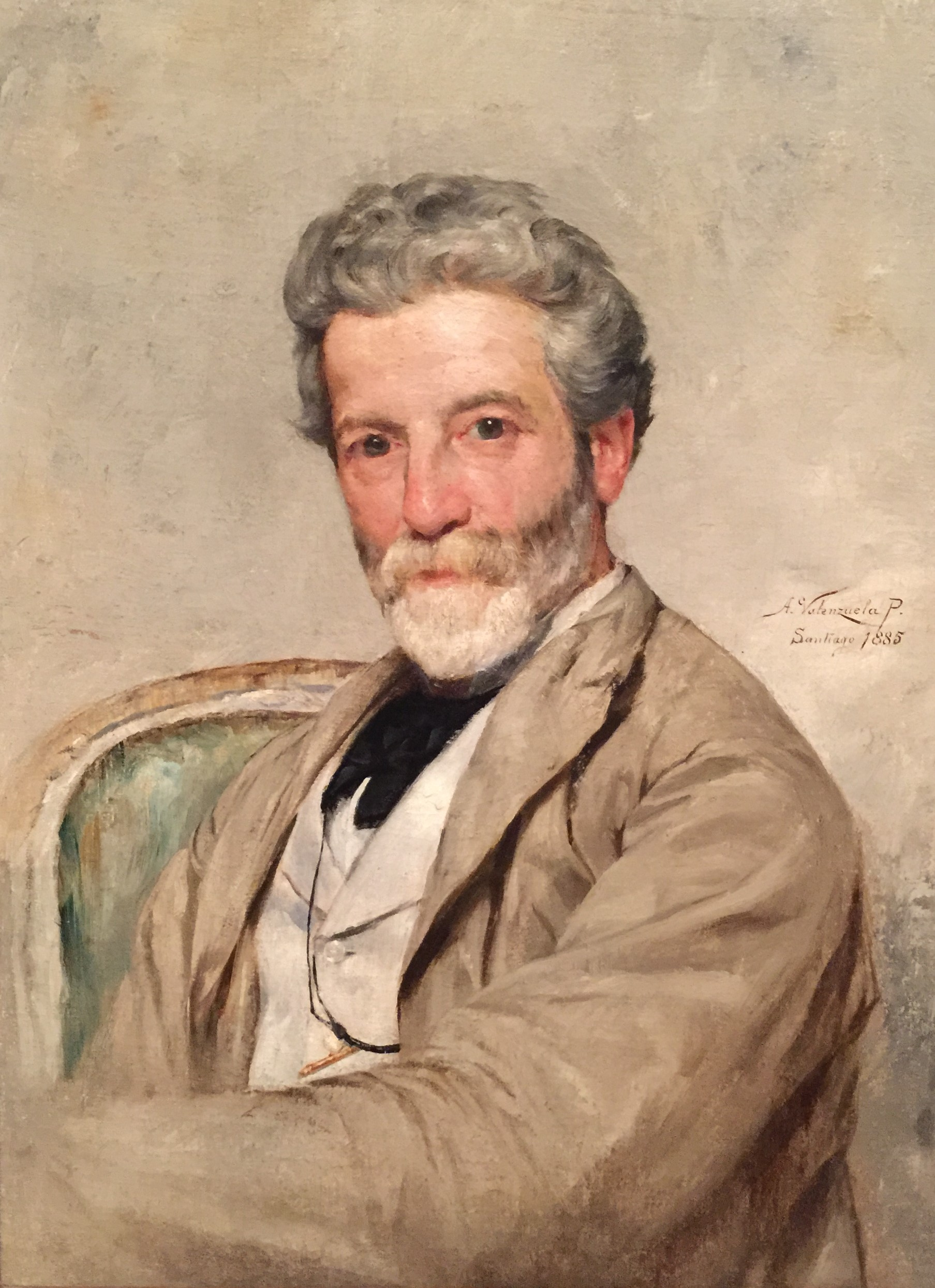
Juan Mochi; portrait by Alfredo Valenzuela Puelma (1885)

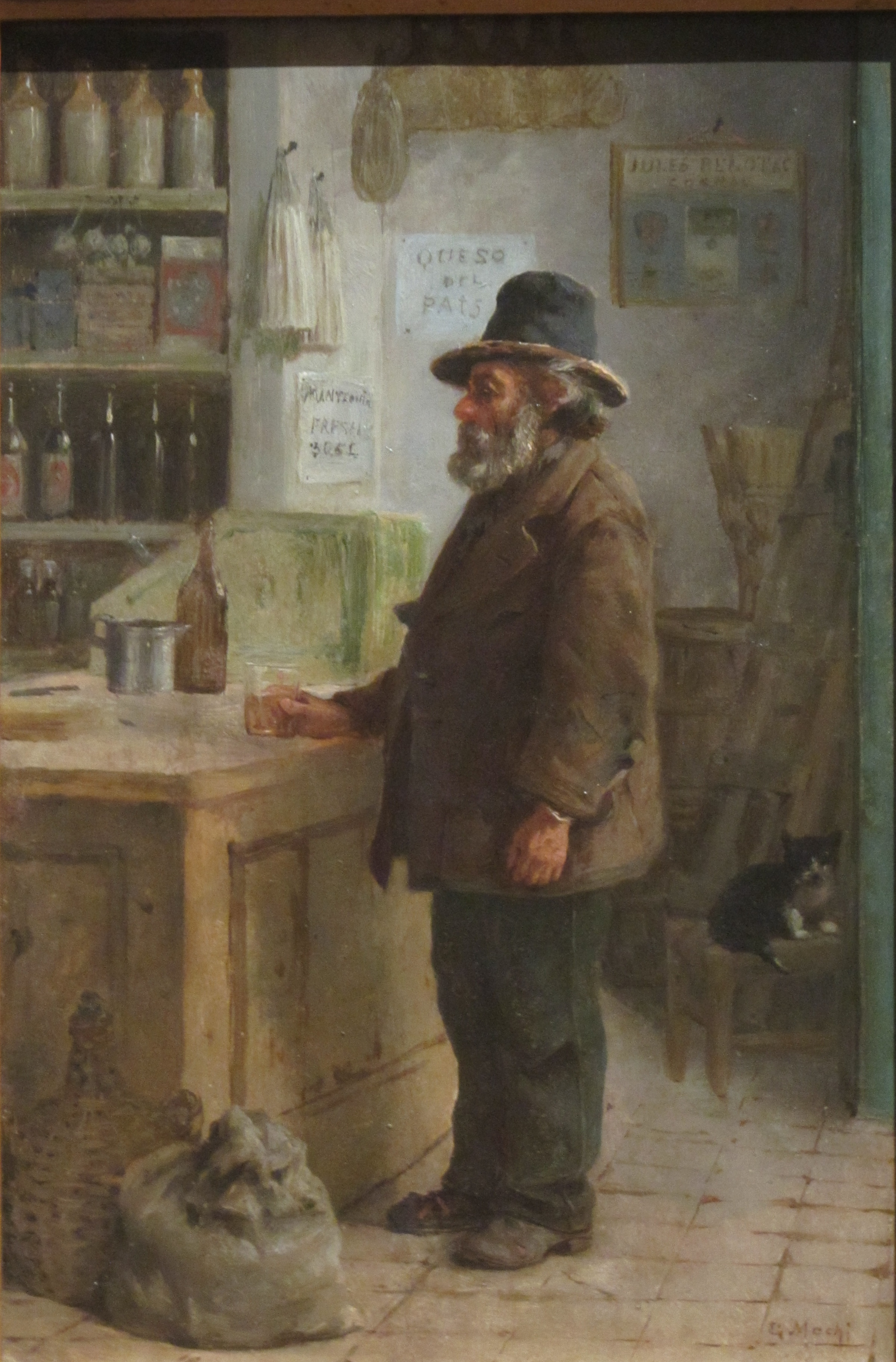
The Client

Juan Mochi or, in Italian, Giovanni Mochi (1831– 1892) was an Italian painter who spent sixteen years as a Professor in Chile and influenced the artists who came to be known as the Great Chilean Masters.

== Biography ==
He was born in Florence. He began his artistic studies in his hometown and set up a studio there, achieving some local fame doing paintings in Greco-Roman and Renaissance style. Later, he moved to Rome, where he came to know the Chilean politician, Ángel Gallo Goyenechea, who would play a decisive role in his career. Gallo took some of Mochi's paintings to Chile and, when Mochi moved to Paris after the Franco-Prussian War, introduced him to a circle of notable people from Chile.

Later, Mochi would be recommended as a replacement for Ernesto Kirchbach, the Director of the Academy of Painting (Santiago, Chile), who was resigning due to poor health, and he was hired by the novelist Alberto Blest Gana, who was serving as the Chilean Ambassador in Paris.

He arrived in Santiago in 1876 and took up his position as third Director of the Academia. His contract was eventually renewed six times and he remained in that position until his death. He also served on the commission to organize the Museo Nacional de Pintura; becoming the museum's first Director, from 1880 to 1887.

As a Professor, he emphasized spontaneity, in contrast to Kirchbach's aggressive approach and the classical conservatism of the Academia's first Director, Alejandro Ciccarelli. Among his best-known pupils were Alfredo Valenzuela Puelma, Alberto Valenzuela Llanos, Juan Francisco González, and the sisters Magdalena and Aurora Mira. He continued to paint prolifically; including portraits, landscapes, religious works and scenes from the War of the Pacific.

== See also ==
- Marcos Segundo Maturana
- Pedro Lira Rencoret
