= José Santos Lira Calvo =

Chilean lawyer and politician

Senator of the Republic of Chile
- In office 1855–1876
- Preceded by: José Antonio Lecaros Alcalde
- Succeeded by: Juan José Echenique Bascuñán
- Constituency: Colchagua

Personal details
- Born: 1809 Chimbarongo, Captaincy General of Chile, Spanish Empire
- Died: 25 October 1885 (aged 75–76) Santiago, Chile
- Party: Chilean National Party
- Spouse: Martina Rencoret y Cienfuegos
- Occupation: Lawyer

José Santos Lira Calvo (1809 – 25 October 1886) was a Chilean lawyer and politician. He was born on the San Jose de Toro estate, Chimbarongo in 1809 and died in the city of Santiago on October 25, 1885. He was the son of José Santos Lira Contreras and Carmen Calvo Argomedo. He was married to Martina Rencoret y Cienfuegos. He was the father of one of the four great masters of Chilean painting, the painter Pedro Lira.

== Education and career ==
José Santos Lira Calvo studied at the National Institute, and became a lawyer on April 14, 1832. He was appointed Rapporteur of the Court of Appeals of Santiago (1835) and later was appointed Minister of the Court of Appeals (1840) and then became Minister of the Supreme Court of Justice (1847).

He began to figure in politics when he was elected Parliamentary Representative for Talca in 1849 as a Conservative Party member, although on that occasion he did not hold ownership of the office.

He was elected Senator of the National Party for the province of Colchagua (1855–1876), joining during this time the Standing Committee on War and Navy, in addition to the Constitution, Law and Justice.

When he thought of retiring from public life he was called by the government of Anibal Pinto who invited him to be State advisor and head of the office of the Treasury, while Domingo Santa María was appointed as chief accountant of the Currency, a role he held until his death.
