= Juan Francisco González =

Chilean painter

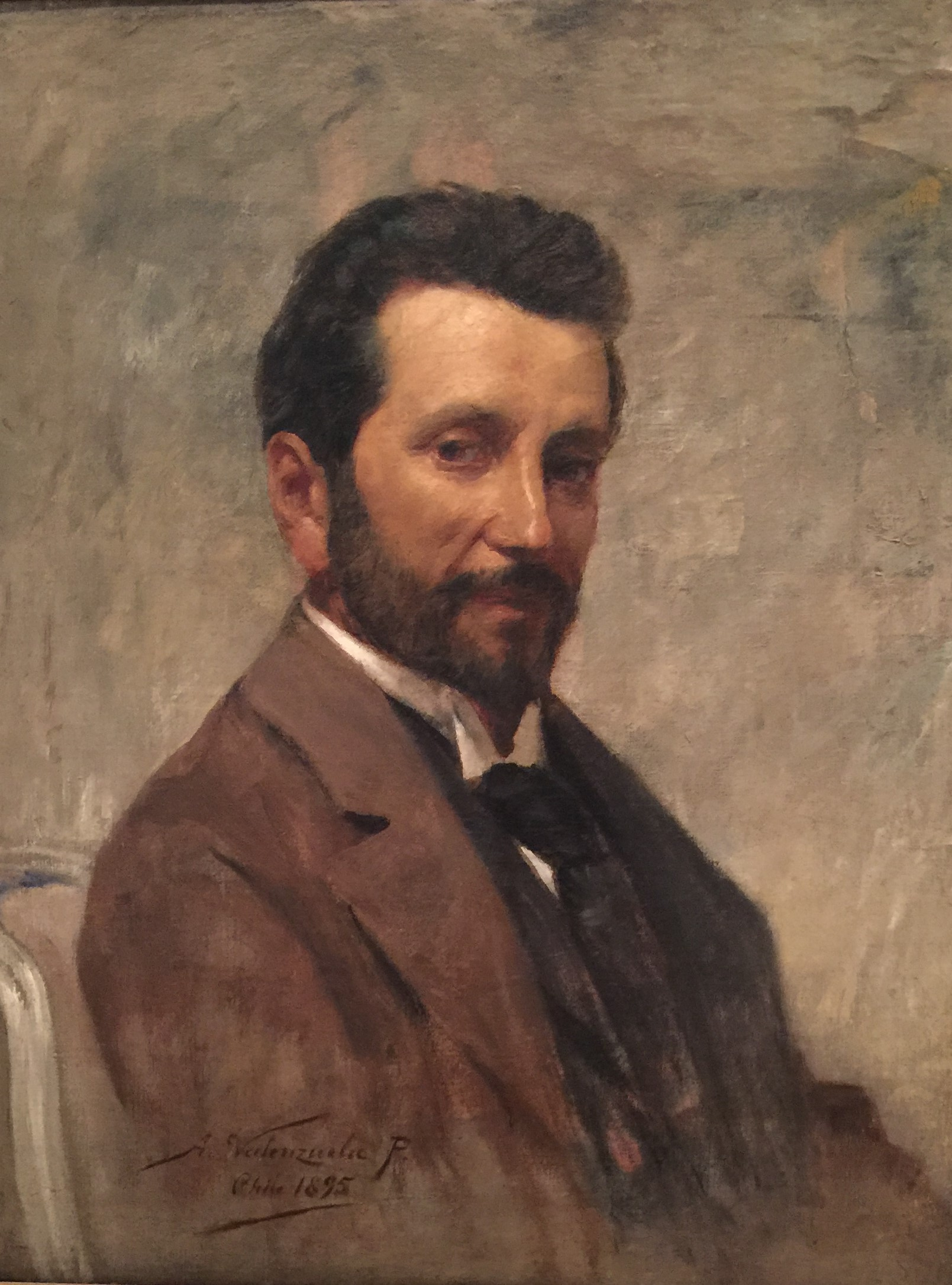
- Portrait by Alfredo Valenzuela Puelma (1895)
- Born: Juan Francisco González; September 25, 1853; Santiago, Chile
- Died: March 4, 1933 (aged 79); Santiago, Chile
- Known for: Painting

Juan Francisco González Escobar (September 25, 1853 – March 4, 1933) is known as one of the four Great Chilean Masters and as the archetypal romantic bohemian artist of the early 20th century. He was the most prolific of the Chilean masters, leaving an estimated 4,000 works, and was also notable for being one of Chile's first modern painters. He was seen as a symbol of the new creative generation that appeared in 20th-century Chile, with a style highly influenced by impressionism and local elements.

From the beginning, González worked in a free and flexible manner and did not stick rigidly to any particular techniques, giving him space to express his lively and restless personality. He took his attitude towards art as an attitude towards life and was considered by his successors as a great example to follow.

As a master, he used to tell his students that to be a good painter, "first you must learn to observe and get excited about the colours and forms of nature, regardless of whether the picture and its details are accurate reflection of reality or not."

== Biography ==
Juan Francisco González, son of José González and Mercedes Escobar, grew up in Recoleta, a neighborhood of Santiago that runs along the side of Cerro Blanco hill, where his family ran a business importing goods from Ecuador. As a child, his parents enrolled him in art classes with Chilean artist Manuel Tapia (1835–1915), and when he was 14 he met Pedro Lira, who would become another of the four Chilean masters. Lira, seeing that the boy had a bright future, recommended that he continue his career at the Academy of Painting (Santiago, Chile). In 1869, aged 16, he entered the Academia, and was taught by the painters Ernesto Kirchbach and Juan Mochi.

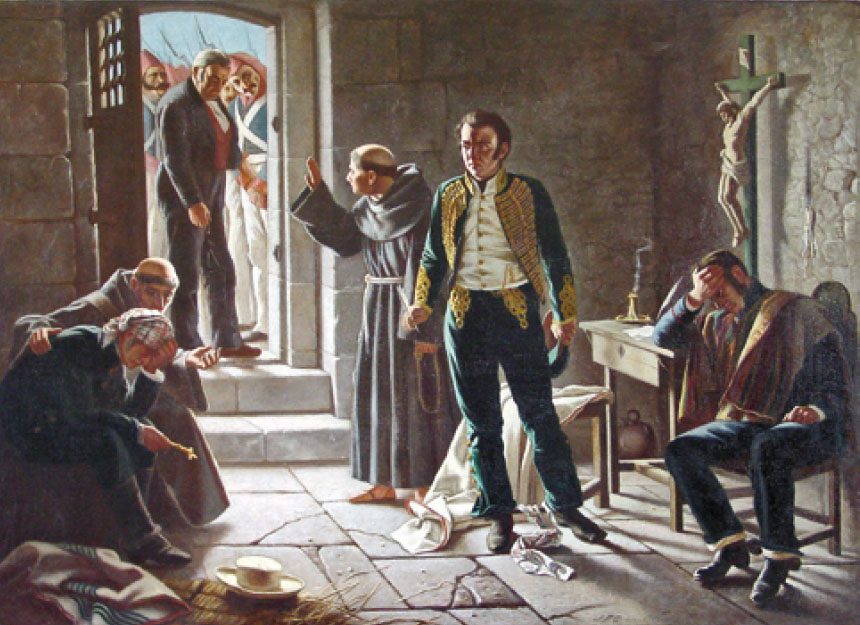
The Last Moments of General José Miguel Carrera

His style was initially quite similar to that of his teachers, but his work progressed during a trip to Europe. His visits to Spain, Italy, England, France and Germany instilled in him a much more modern style of art than the traditional techniques he had learned in Chile. It was in France where he discovered Impressionism, a movement he identified with very much. He incorporated many elements of Impressions into his own style, such as the focus on capturing light and an appreciation for landscape and for small canvases. On his return to Chile in 1906, his name started to become well known after giving a lecture at the University of Chile and was appointed as a lecturer at the Academia, teaching sketching and freehand drawing.

After leaving his teaching job, he dedicated himself to painting again and began capturing the flowers and fruits of Chile using secure and calm brushstrokes, thick acrylic paint and rough textures that are characteristic of his work. Although some of his paintings are very small, González' ability to communicate tastes and smells to the viewer is remarkable. He won several awards in Chile, including third prize at the 1884 Salón de Santiago exhibition, second prize at the 1890 Salón Oficial exhibition and first prize at the 1900 Salón Oficial.

He constantly sought freer expression through his painting, investigating and experimenting with his painting materials to achieve, for example, a transparency in oil paint that made it look similar to watercolor. His skillful execution and sensitivity to atmosphere placed him alongside the community of young artists who revolutionized visual arts in 19th century Paris. His favorite subjects included peasants, adobe houses and flowers, handling with skill the movement and color of flowers, and his youthful spirit always kept him current. His most famous quotations include:

"Grace is not in truth itself, but in the personal expression of it. To draw is to express, drawing is like writing, so one should write as one thinks". "Unlike the scientific method, which proceeds by analysis, art proceeds by synthesis". "You must look quickly and with the eyes of the soul and heart".

His influence can be seen in the "Tragic Generation", better known as the Generación del 13, and the controversial "Montparnasse Group". He himself was part of the literature group "Los Diez" (The Ten), who tried to live by balancing aesthetics and ethics, creative spirit and art, a philosophy which González maintained even after the group dissolved.

He died in Santiago on March 4, 1933, and is considered to have changed the course of Chilean painting. Isabel Cruz González called him "the first modern Chilean painter" and said that "he left a mark like none other of his contemporaries, capturing on canvas the essence of Chilean popular life." Throughout his career, until the day he died, he aimed for the maximum effect on the canvas, minimising and simplifying the themes, a characteristic that can be observed from his early landscapes to the still lifes he produced at the end of his life.

== Selected works ==
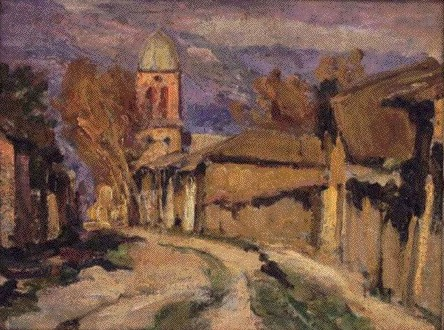
Alley in San Fernando

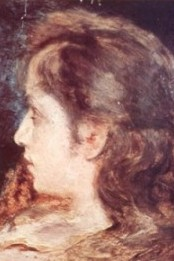
Mariana

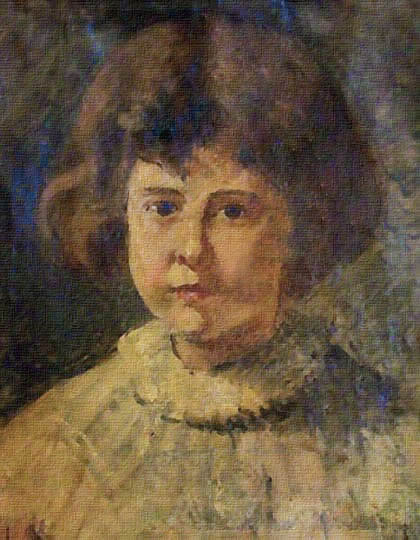
Portrait of a Girl

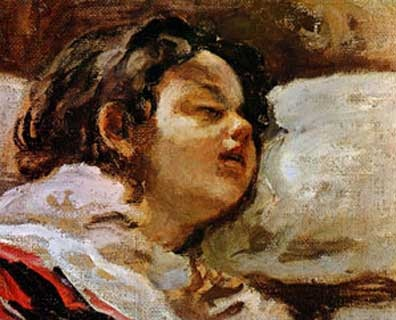
The Sleeping Boy

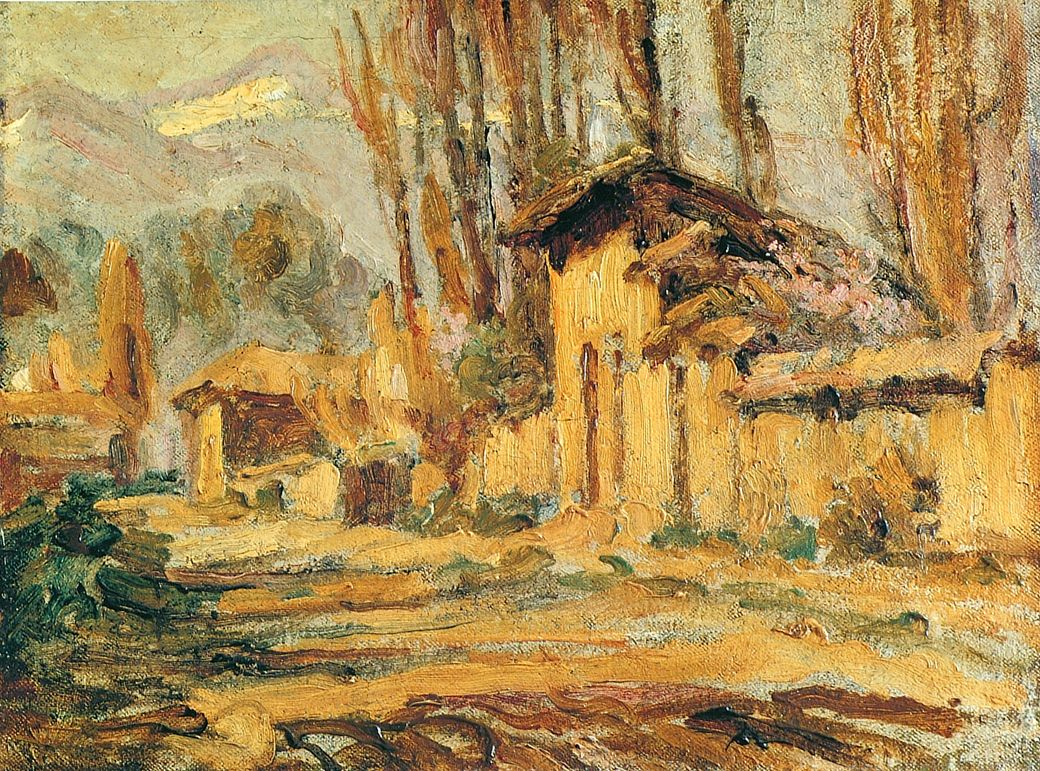
San Bernardo Street

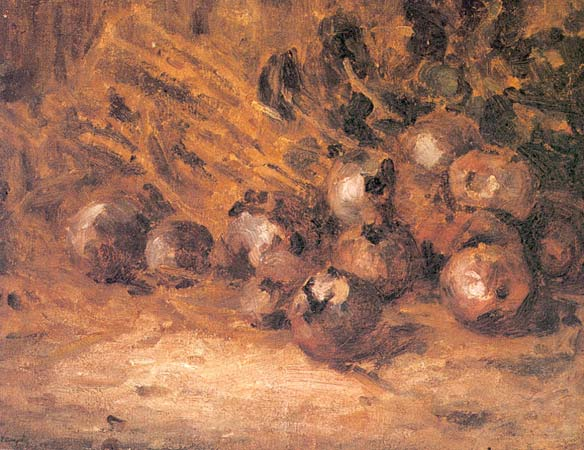
Lucumas

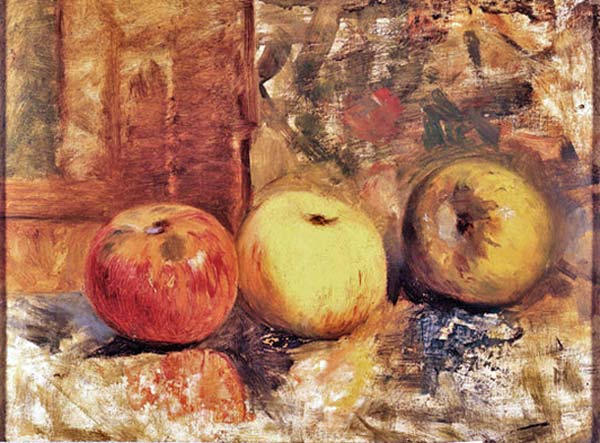
Apples

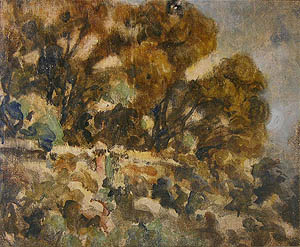
Walnuts

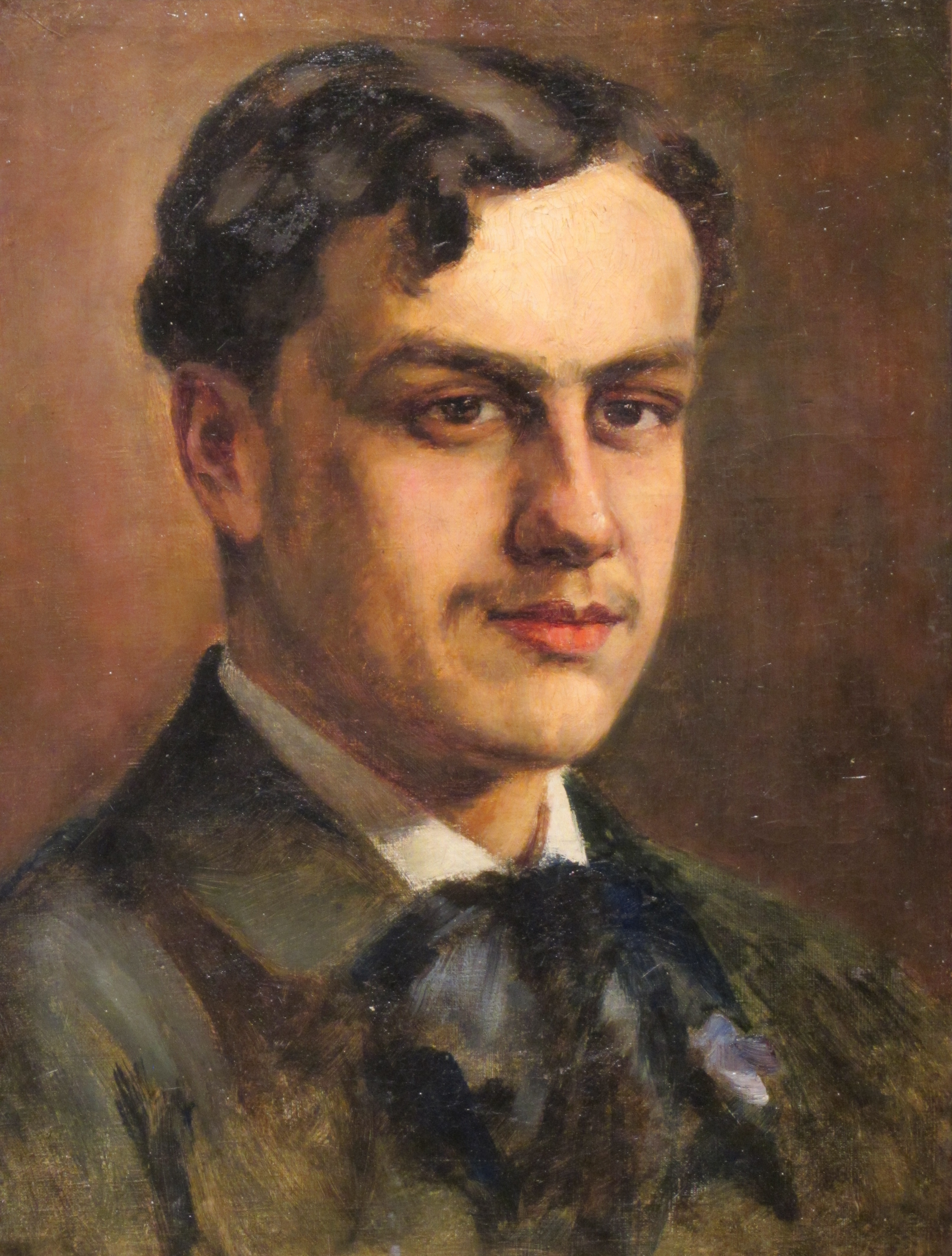
Augusto d'Halmar

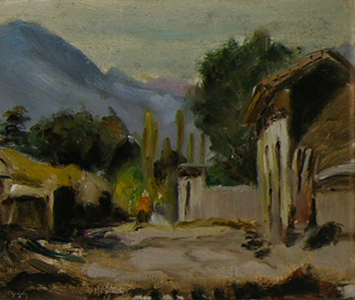
Limachito

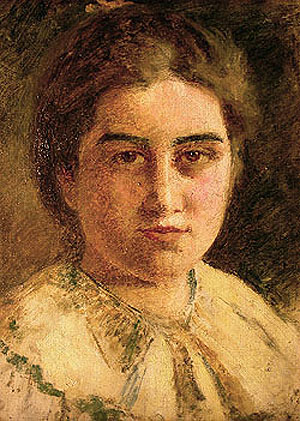
Portrait of a Lady

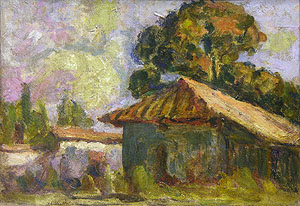
Farm Landscape

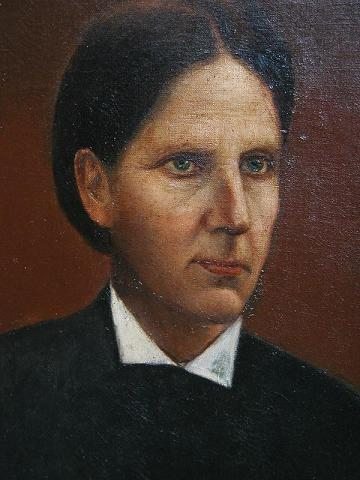
Rosario de Caviedes

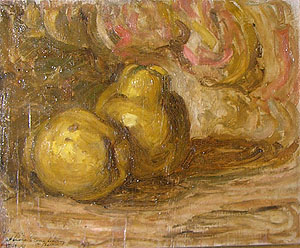
Quince

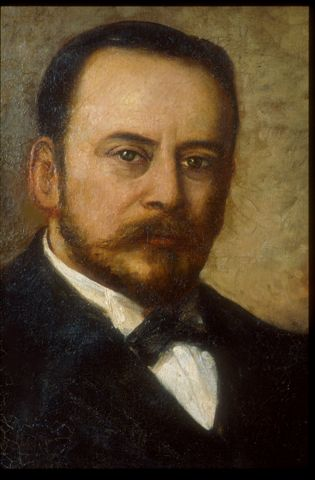
Eloy Caviedes

== Awards ==
- 1884 3rd Place, Salón de Santiago, Chile.
- 1890 2nd Place, Salón Oficial, Santiago, Chile.
- 1892 Landscape Prize, Edwards Award, Salón Oficial, Santiago, Chile.
- 1896 2nd Place, Valparaíso Municipality Exposition, Chile.
- 1898 Honourable Mention, Salón Oficial, Santiago, Chile.
- 1900 1st Place, Salón Oficial, Santiago, Chile.
- 1901 Landscape Prize, Edwards Award, Salón Oficial, Santiago, Chile.
- 1910 2ª Place, Buenos Aires International Exhibition, Argentina.
- 1929 award winner at the Seville Hispano-American Exhibition, Spain.
- 1929 Honourable Mention, Edwards Award, Salón Oficial. Santiago, Chile.
- 1997 named most influential painter in Chile in a top ten ranking produced by a survey of a hundred thought leaders by the Cultural Corporation of Las Condes, Santiago, Chile

== See also ==
- Agustín Abarca
- Alberto Valenzuela Llanos
- Pablo Burchard
- Alfredo Valenzuela Puelma
