= Pedro Lira =

Chilean painter and art critic

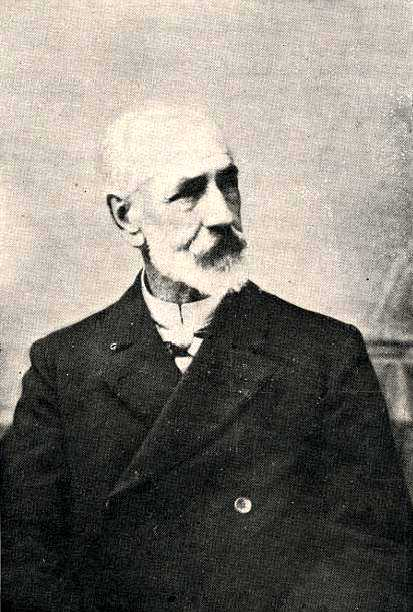
Pedro Lira (1900s)

Pedro Francisco Lira Rencoret (17 May 1845 – 20 April 1912) was a Chilean painter and art critic, who organized exhibitions that led to the establishment of the Chilean National Museum of Fine Arts. He is best known for his eclectic portraits of women.

== Biography ==
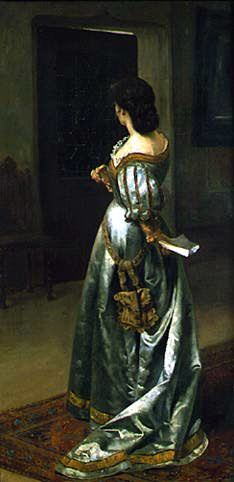
The Love Letter

He was born into a wealthy family in Santiago. His father was José Santos Lira Calvo, Minister of the Court of Appeals. His primary education was received at the Instituto Nacional General José Miguel Carrera. Pursuing an interest in art, he enrolled at the Academy of Painting (Santiago, Chile), which was under the direction of Alejandro Ciccarelli, a noted Neoclassical painter from Italy.

In 1862, he found a position in the workshop of Antonio Smith, while studying law at the University of Chile. He graduated in 1867, but gave up his plans for a legal career to pursue painting instead. In 1872, he won a medal at a competition celebrating the establishment of the Mercado Central de Santiago, organized by Benjamín Vicuña Mackenna.

Encouraged by this, he was able to obtain a grant to study in Europe, going there with his wife in the company of his friend and future brother-in-law, Alberto Orrego Luco. Upon arriving in Paris, he found himself in the middle of an artistic battle between Neoclassicism and Romanticism, but did not take sides. After some thought, he chose Jules-Élie Delaunay to be his teacher.

Lira lived in France from 1873 to 1884 and was influenced by Eugène Delacroix, many of whose paintings he copied. Later, he received an "honorable mention" at the Salon, where little recognition was generally given to Latin American artists. But, despite his successes, he decided to return to Chile, as the time appeared ripe to create an artistic milieu comparable to that in Paris.

=== Activities in Chile ===
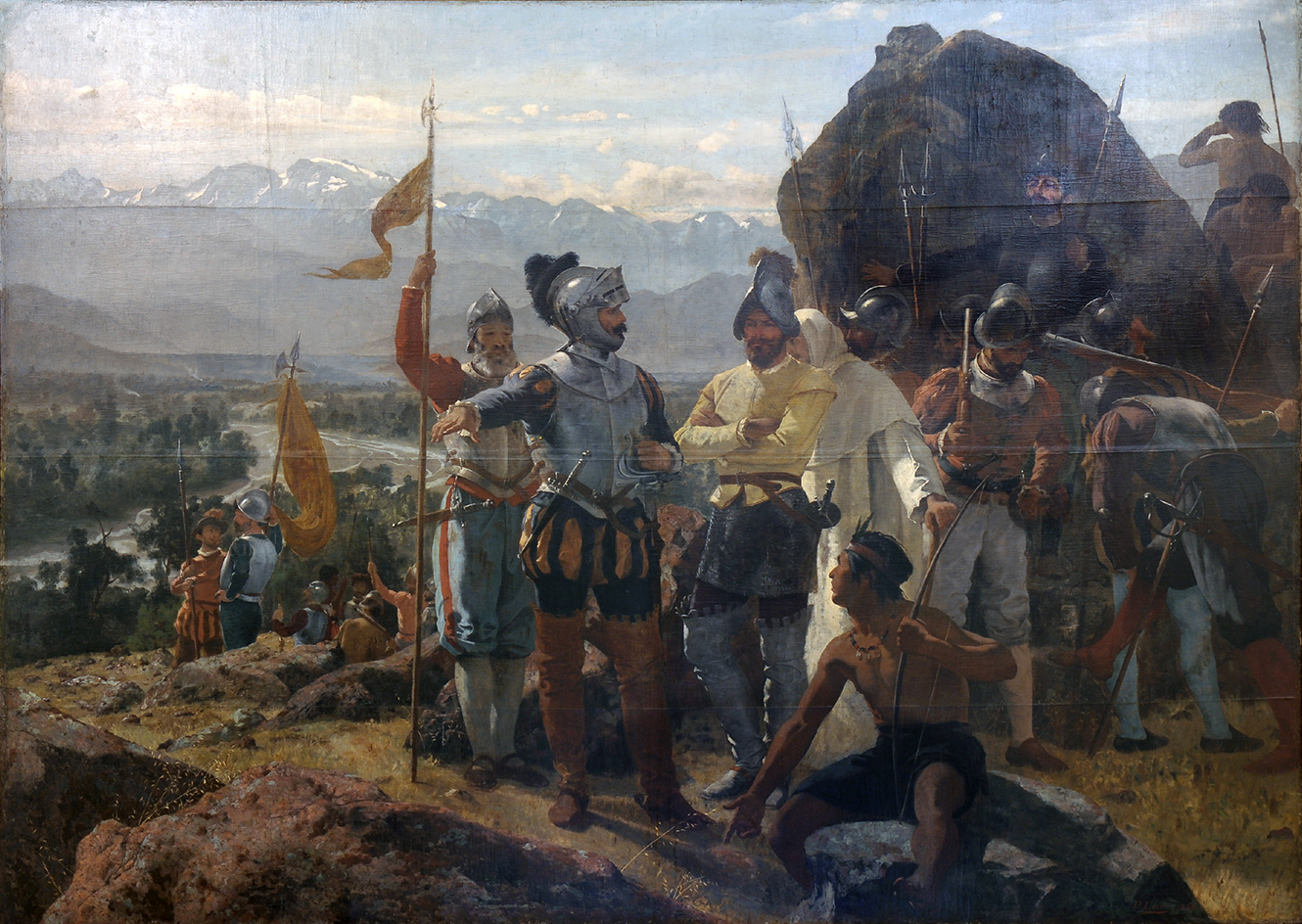
Fundación de Santiago (1888)

Soon after his arrival, he organized the first exposition devoted exclusively to Chilean painters. Together with the sculptor José Miguel Blanco, he founded the "Unión Artística", an organization devoted to promoting more exhibitions and, ultimately, creating the Museo Nacional de Bellas Artes de Chile, which was originally located on the second floor of the National Congress Building. He also created a Salon, similar to the one in Paris, and helped establish a museum in the Quinta Normal, where expositions were held until 1910.

In 1893, he was appointed Director of the Academy of Painting (Santiago, Chile). Although he served as a Professor there, it remains unclear whether or not he ever took on the duties of the Directorship, which passed to Virginio Arias in 1900. While there, he was a mentor for promising new artists. Among the best-known painters whose careers he supported are Pablo Burchard, Pedro Reszka Moreau and Celia Castro, the first Chilean woman to become a notable artist. He also compiled Chile's first "Biographical Dictionary of Painters" and translated Hippolyte Taine's Philosophy of Art. Several historical paintings of his have been used on Chilean banknotes.

Lira died in 1912 in Santiago.

== Selected paintings ==
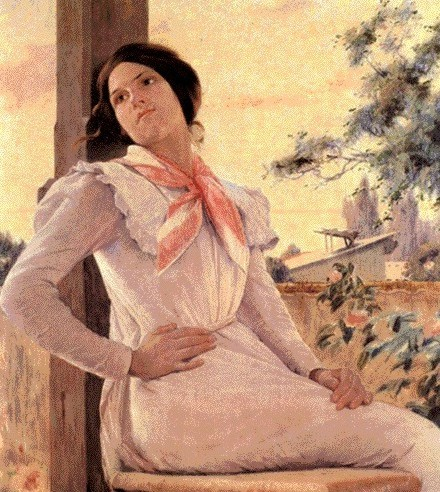
On the Balcony

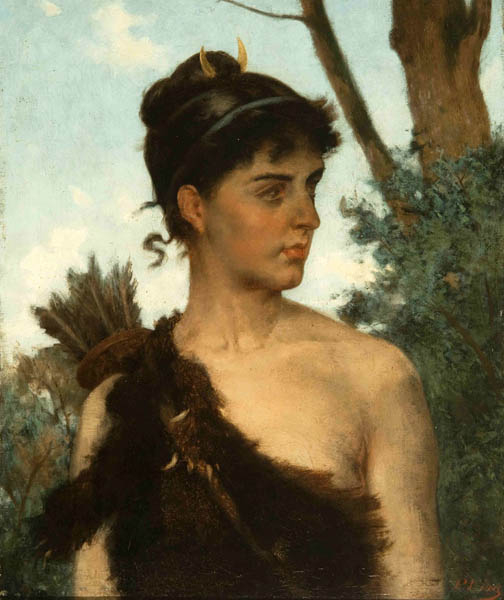
Diana the Huntress

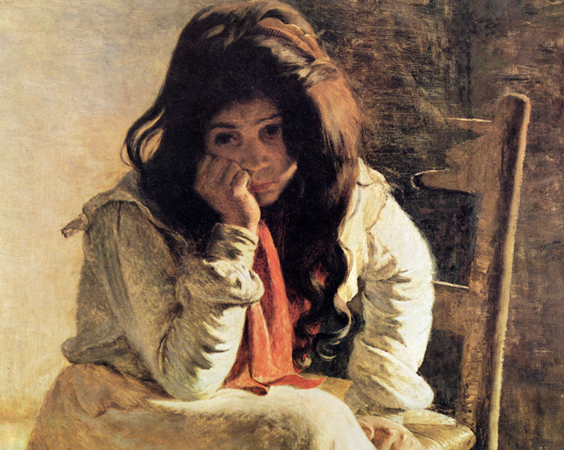
Woman of the People

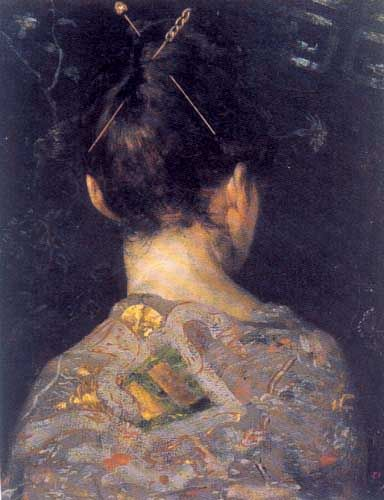
Woman with Pins

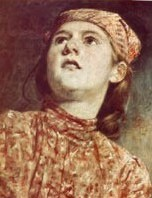
Gypsy Woman

== See also ==
- Marcos Segundo Maturana
- Juan Mochi
