= Chilean National Museum of Fine Arts =

Chilean art museum

Coordinates: 33°26′7.15″S 70°38′36.81″W

- Museo Nacional de Bellas Artes (MNBA)

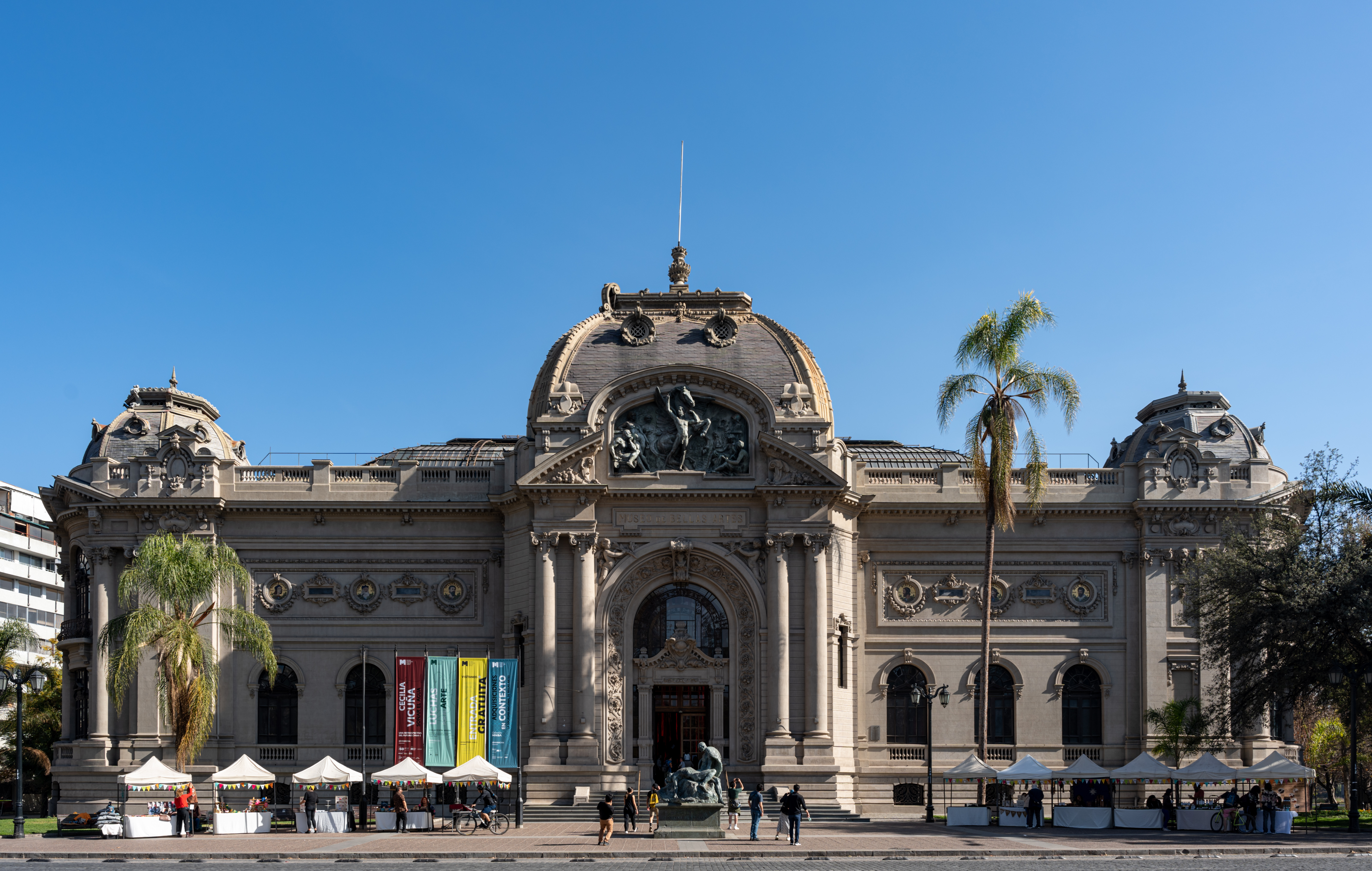
- Museo Nacional de Bellas Artes
- Established: 1880
- Location: Santiago, Chile
- Visitors: 386,714 (2009)
- Director: Fernando Pérez Oyarzún
- Website: http://www.mnba.cl/

The Chilean National Museum of Fine Arts (Spanish: Museo Nacional de Bellas Artes or MNBA), located in Santiago, Chile, is one of the major centers for Chilean art and for broader South American art. Established in 1880 (making it the oldest in South America), the organization is managed by the Artistic Union (Unión Artística).

The current building, the Palace of the Fine Arts (el Palacio de Bellas Artes), dates to 1910 and commemorates the first centennial of the Independence of Chile. It was designed by the Chilean architect Emile Jéquier in a full-blown Beaux-arts style and is situated in the Parque Forestal of Santiago. Behind it is located the Museum of Contemporary Art (Museo de Arte Contemporáneo) of the University of Chile, in which is also located the old School of Fine Arts (Escuela de Bellas Artes).

== History ==
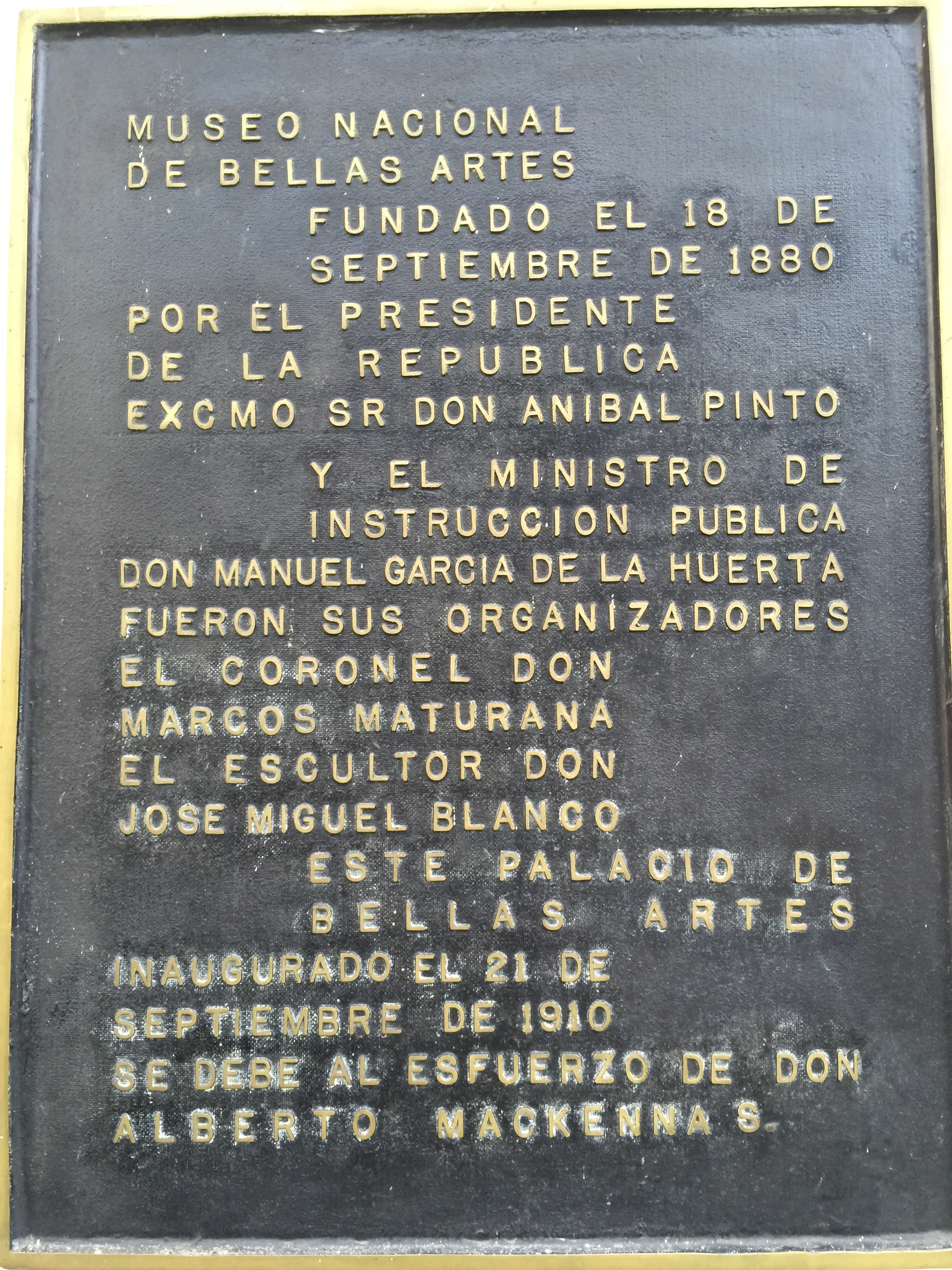
Foundational Plate of the National Museum of Fine Arts

The museum was officially founded on September 18, 1880, and originally named Museo National de Pinturas (National Painting Museum).

The president of Chile, Don Aníbal Pinto, the minister Don Manuel García de la Huerta, Marcos Segundo Maturana and the sculptor José Miguel Blanco together managed the creation of the museum, whose first director was the painter Juan Mochi.

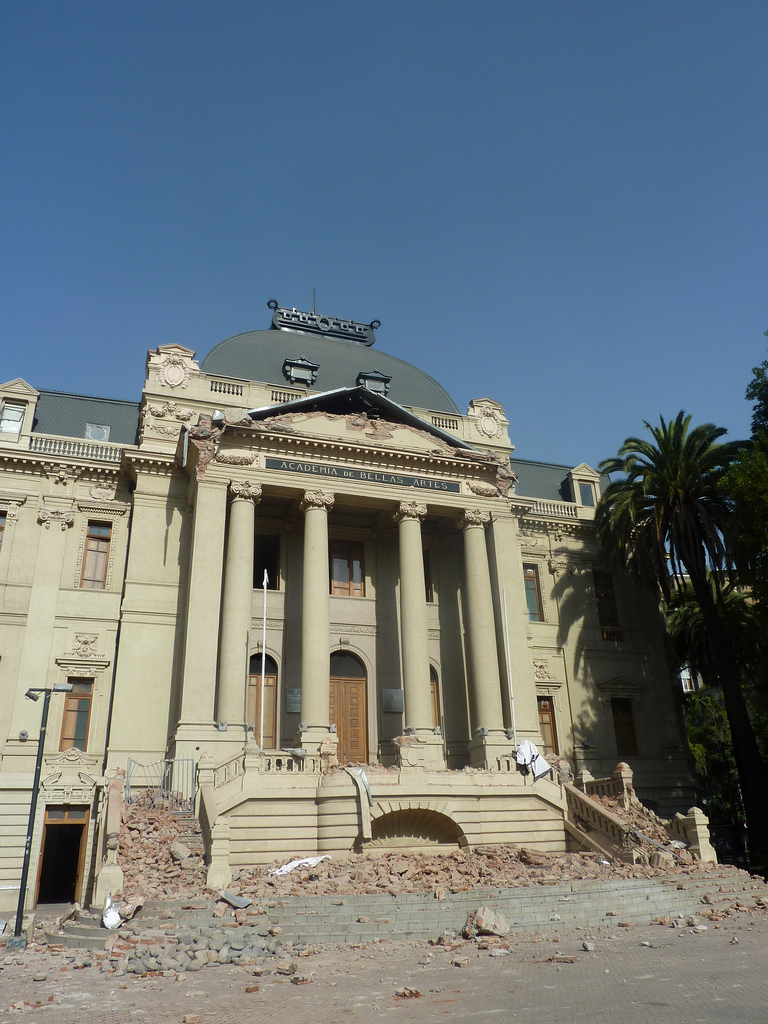
Exterior of the museum after the 2010 Chile earthquake.

In 1887 the government acquired a building known as "the Parthenon", which had been constructed by the Artistic Union for the purpose of hosting annual art expositions. The museum moved there and changed its name to Museum of Fine Arts.

In 1901 the government decided to create an original building for the Museum and School of Fine Arts, and Emilio Jéquier was selected. The building was built in the Parque Forestal, a landscaping work by Jorge Enrique Dubois, who had been trained in the gardening school of Versailles in France.

Upon the completion of the building, it was officially inaugurated on September 21, 1910, as part of an International Exposition which formed part of the celebrations for the centennial of independence. The Museum has remained in the "Palace" ever since.

The building was damaged during the 1960 Chilean Earthquake, after which it was seismically upgraded, such that damage during the 2010 Chile earthquake was confined to fallen elements of the exterior.

== Architecture ==
The Palacio de Bellas Artes, the current home of the Museum, is in the Neoclassical Second Empire style and the Baroque Revival style, strongly reinforced with Art Nouveau details and touches of metallic structural architecture. The central entrance is through a gigantically enlarged version of Borromini's false-perspective window reveals from Palazzo Barberini, which encloses a pedimented doorway entirely surrounded by glass, a Beaux-Arts touch. Through a broken pediment the squared cupola rises to the top. The internal layout and the facade are both modelled after the Petit Palais of Paris. The glass cupola that crowns the central hall was designed and manufactured in Belgium and brought to Chile in 1907. The approximate weight of the armour of the museum is 115,000 kg, of the glass of the cupola, 2,400 kg.

Architectonically, the floorplan of the museum is one of a central axis marked by the entrance and a grand hall with a staircase to the second floor. In the grand hall, above a balcony from the second floor, there is a carving in high relief which depicts two angels supporting a shield. They are located in the semi-vault above the heads of two Caryatids that arise from the balcony, carved by Antonio Coll y Pi.
