= José Miguel Blanco =

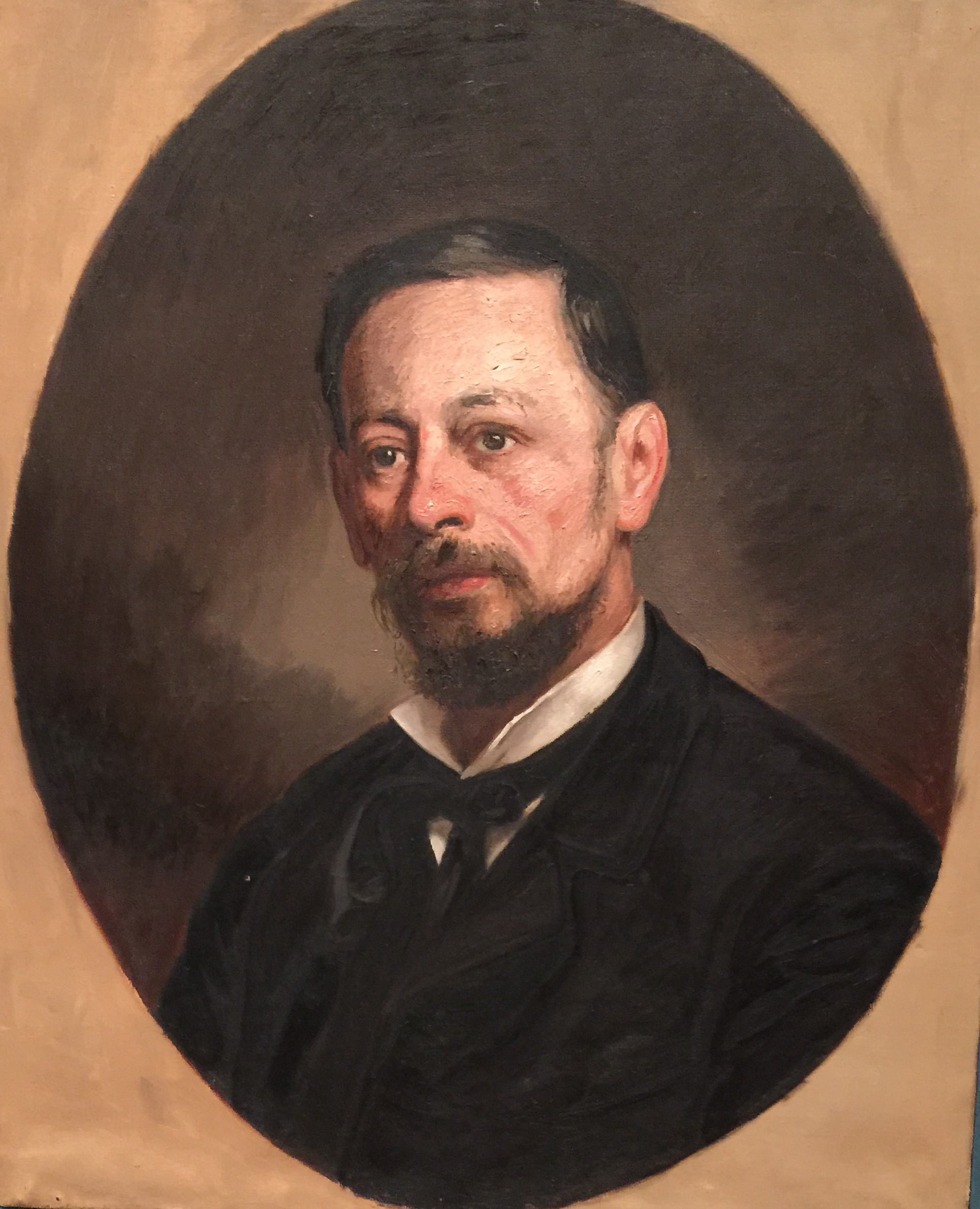
José Miguel Blanco; portrait by Ezequiel Plaza

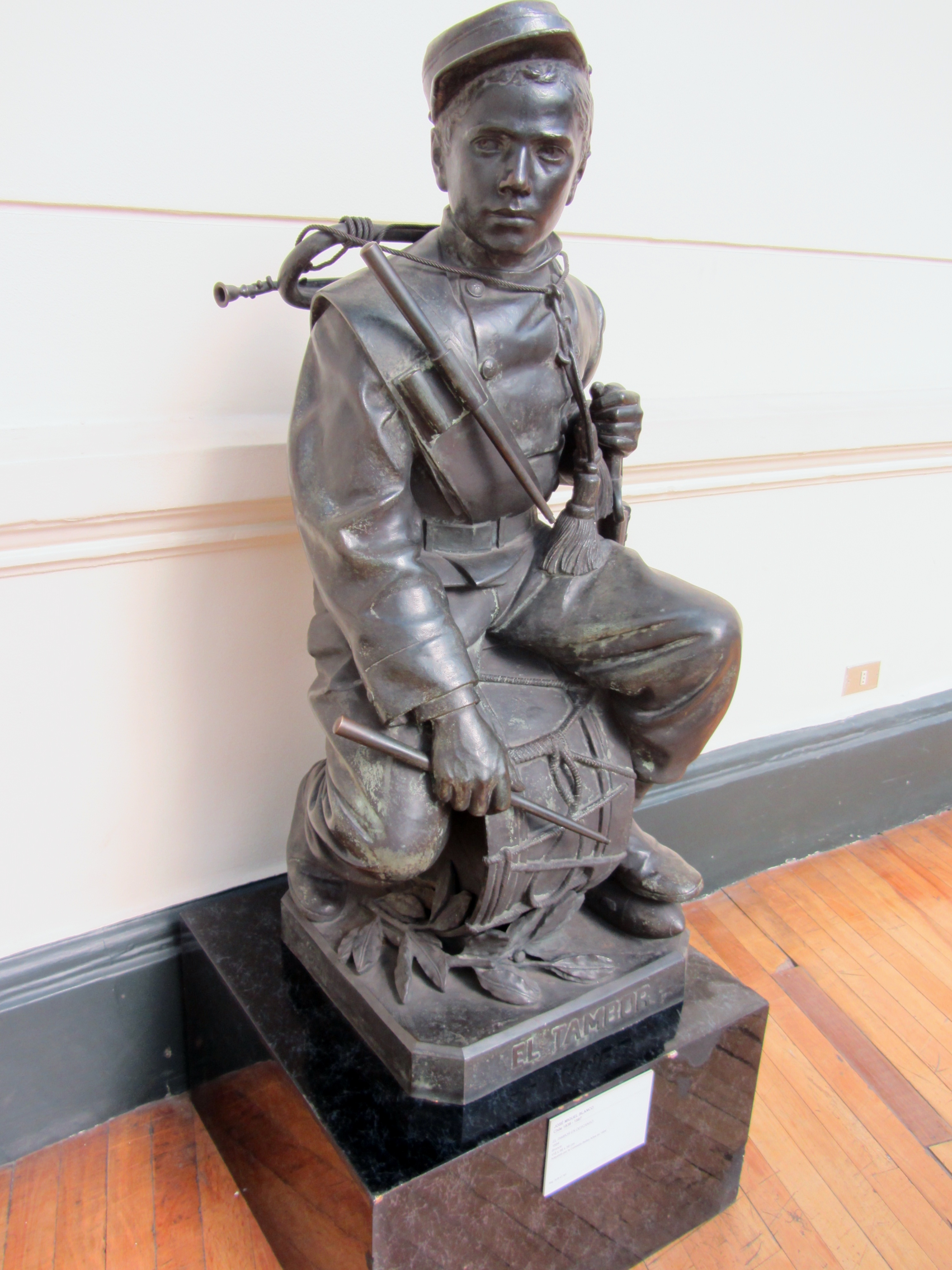
The Drummer at Rest

José Miguel Blanco Gavilán (16 December 1839, Santiago — 4 February 1897, Santiago) was a Chilean sculptor, illustrator and writer.

== Biography ==
His artistic education began in a series of night classes for day laborers, taught by the Italian-born artist, Juan Bianchi (1817-1875) at the Instituto Nacional. In 1858, he was accepted for the sculpture workshop at the Escuela de Bellas Artes, where his instructor was the French-born sculptor, Auguste François (1800-1876).

In 1867, thanks to a recommendation from Professor Diego Barros Arana, he was granted a scholarship by President José Joaquín Pérez, which enabled him to continue his studies in Europe. When he arrived in Paris, he was able to join the medallion workshop of the sculptor, Jean-Baptiste Farochon. Two years later, he entered the École nationale supérieure des Beaux-Arts, where he studied with Auguste Dumont and Eugène Guillaume.

Due to the Franco-Prussian War, he had to leave Paris; travelling to Belgium, England and Italy. While in Italy, he took time to study; notably with Giuseppe Mancinelli, a friend of the former Director of the Academia de Pintura in Santiago, Alejandro Ciccarelli. Once the situation in France had returned to normal, he went back to Paris and resumed his studies. He returned to Chile in 1876; bringing with him over forty works, including small sculptures, bas-reliefs and medallions.

This direct contact with European art was the decisive factor in creating his artistic personality. He made considerable effort to collect photographs and reproductions for his studio; as graphic documentation. His students were charged with visiting as many museums as possible and making note of what they saw there.

He also experienced intellectual stimulation, which resulted in work as a writer and chronicler; all devoted to the dissemination of art. His many journalistic collaborations included work with Las veladas literarias (Literary Evenings) and El Ferrocarril (The Railroad). Later, he helped to create the art journals, El San Lunes (On Monday) and El Taller Ilustrado (The Illustrated Workshop, 1885). The latter was Chile's first publication devoted entirely to art.
