= Chilean frigate Chile =

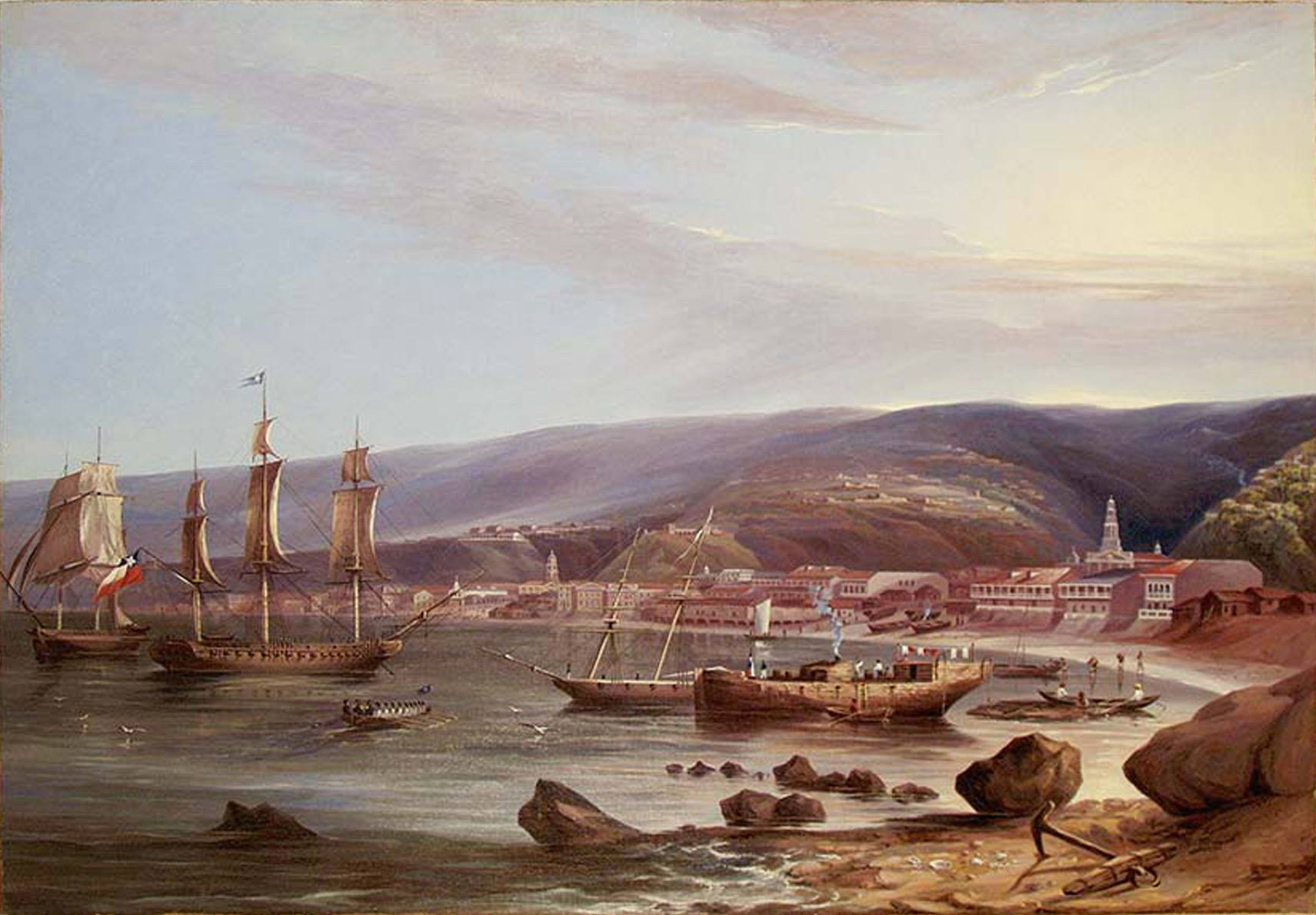
- Frigate Chile in Valparaíso, in an oil painting from 1845 by the American Jacob C. Ward.

History

Chile
- Name: Chile
- Operator: Chilean Navy
- Ordered: 1838
- Builder: M. Courrant, Bordeaux
- Cost: $ 250,000
- Commissioned: 10 Mai 1840
- Decommissioned: 1858
- Fate: Scrapped

General characteristics
- Displacement: 1,109 t
- Propulsion: sail
- Crew: 300 - 50
- Armament: 44 guns

The impressive frigate Chile was built 1840 in Bordeaux, France, by order of the Chilean government, but without building supervision, the use of poorly dried timber that had been felled outside the normal winter season was the main cause of rot damage.

She saw little active service. After the first voyage to Callao, the crew was reduced to 50 from 300 men, and 1841 she should be disarmed for reasons of economy, but because of the tensions between Perú and Bolivia after the War of the Confederation (see Battle of Ingavi) she was refitted again.

During the time the frigate was commanded by Roberto Simpson Francisco Hudson was employed on board.

In 1847 she was damaged by a fire on board of a neighboring salpeter ship and she beached in Valparaíso as she attempted to exit the harbor.

After a few years she was relegated to the role of Pontoon and later as training ship for the Nautical school of the Chilean Navy until 1858.

== See also ==
- List of decommissioned ships of the Chilean Navy
