= Pizarro (brigantine) =

Chilean sailing vessel (1858–59)

History

Chile
- Name: Pizarro
- Namesake: Francisco Pizarro
- Ordered: 1858
- Fate: Disappeared near Cape Horn March 1859

General characteristics
- Type: Brigantine

Pizarro was a brigantine in the service of the Chilean Ministry of the Interior between 1858 and 1859.

Pizarro was built in Spain. While she was at Valparaíso, Chile, her original private owners thought she was in such a bad state that she would not be able to return to Europe. Therefore, they allowed her captain to sell her at a low price to the Chiliean Ministry of the Interior in 1858.

The Ministry of the Interior used Pizarro to serve the needs of the nascent Chilean colony at the Strait of Magellan. During her short service life she was commanded by Chilean Navy Captain Francisco Hudson.

Pizarro disappeared sometime between March 7 and 9, 1859, while attempting to sail westwards around Cape Horn. Pizarro′s companion ship Meteoro survived the storm and managed to pass Cape Horn and return to central Chile.
