= Roca Remolinos =

Submarine hill in Chile

Coordinates: 41°47′44″S 73°31′23″W

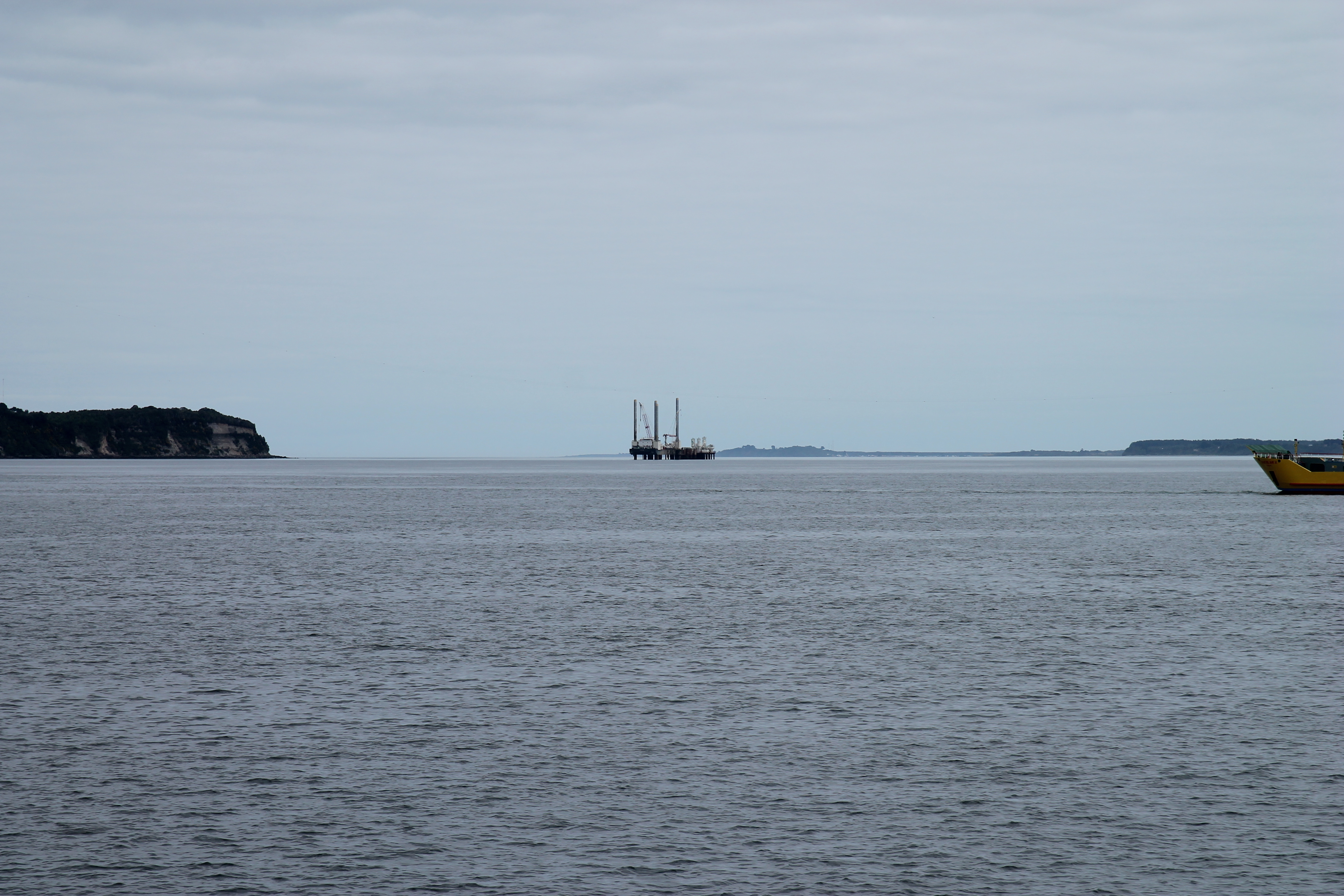
Platform built on top of the Roca Remolinos during the ongoing construction of Chacao Channel bridge. Picture from January 2019.

Roca Remolinos (lit. "Eddies Rock") is a submarine hill in Chacao Channel, Chile, notorious for being a major hazard for traffic along the channel. With its highest point at 20 metres (66 ft) below sea level, Roca Remolinos does not break the surface during ordinary low tides, but its top can occasionally be seen during extremely low tides. It is located at the narrowest part of the channel, about 700 metres (2,300 ft) from the nearest shore (the southern one). Its northern slope reaches 16° while its southern one reaches 14°. The rock composition varies: four different horizontal layers have been identified, all of which are made of combinations of sand and silt cemented by ferric oxide. The uppermost 40 metres (130 ft) is a caprock layer made of medium to fine sandstone and is tuffite. Below this layer comes 35 metres (115 ft) of medium sandstone which in parts has low cementation levels. Below this there are 30 metres (98 ft) of well-cemented silt. Under the well-cemented silt there is at least 20 metres (66 ft) of densely compacted medium sand which is partly cemented.

When there are strong tidal currents in Chacao Channel the rock creates eddies, drawing objects to it.

Roca Remolinos was studied by Chilean Navy officer Francisco Hudson in the 19th century. In early planning Chacao Channel bridge was not planned to have a central tower, but it was redesigned to make use of Roca Remolinos for installing a central tower and cut thus the span in half. Before the final decision, Roca Remolinos was investigated for its capability to support a tower. As of 2023 the central tower is being built on top of Roca Remolinos.

Sketch of Chacao Channel Bridge according to Diario Concepción.
