= Meteoro (brigantine) =

History

Mexico
- Name: Meteoro
- Builder: New Orleans, United States
- Commissioned: 1848
- Fate: Sold to Chile, 1850

Chile
- Fate: Scrapped 1861

General characteristics
- Type: Brigantine
- Displacement: 290 long tons (295 t)
- Armament: 8 × 24 lbs canons; 2 × 9 lbs canons

Meteoro was a brigantine of the Chilean Navy originally built in New Orleans for the Mexican Navy prior to the Mexican–American War. During its service in the Chilean Navy the ship engaged in the suppression of the Mutiny of Cambiazo in the Straits of Magellan. In 1859 Meteoro, commanded by Martín Aguayo, almost sunk at during a storm in Cape Horn while its companion ship Pizarro commanded by Francisco Hudson was lost.
