= Álvaro Casanova Zenteno =

Chilean painter (1857–1939)

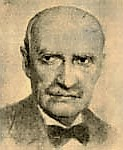
- Born: Álvaro Casanova Zenteno; 21 November 1857; Santiago, Chile
- Died: 25 May 1939 (aged 81); Santiago, Chile
- Known for: Painter
- Movement: Romanticism
- Awards: Award of Honor and Gold Medal granted by King Alfonso XIII in 1929
- Patrons: Painting of realism and sailor

Signature
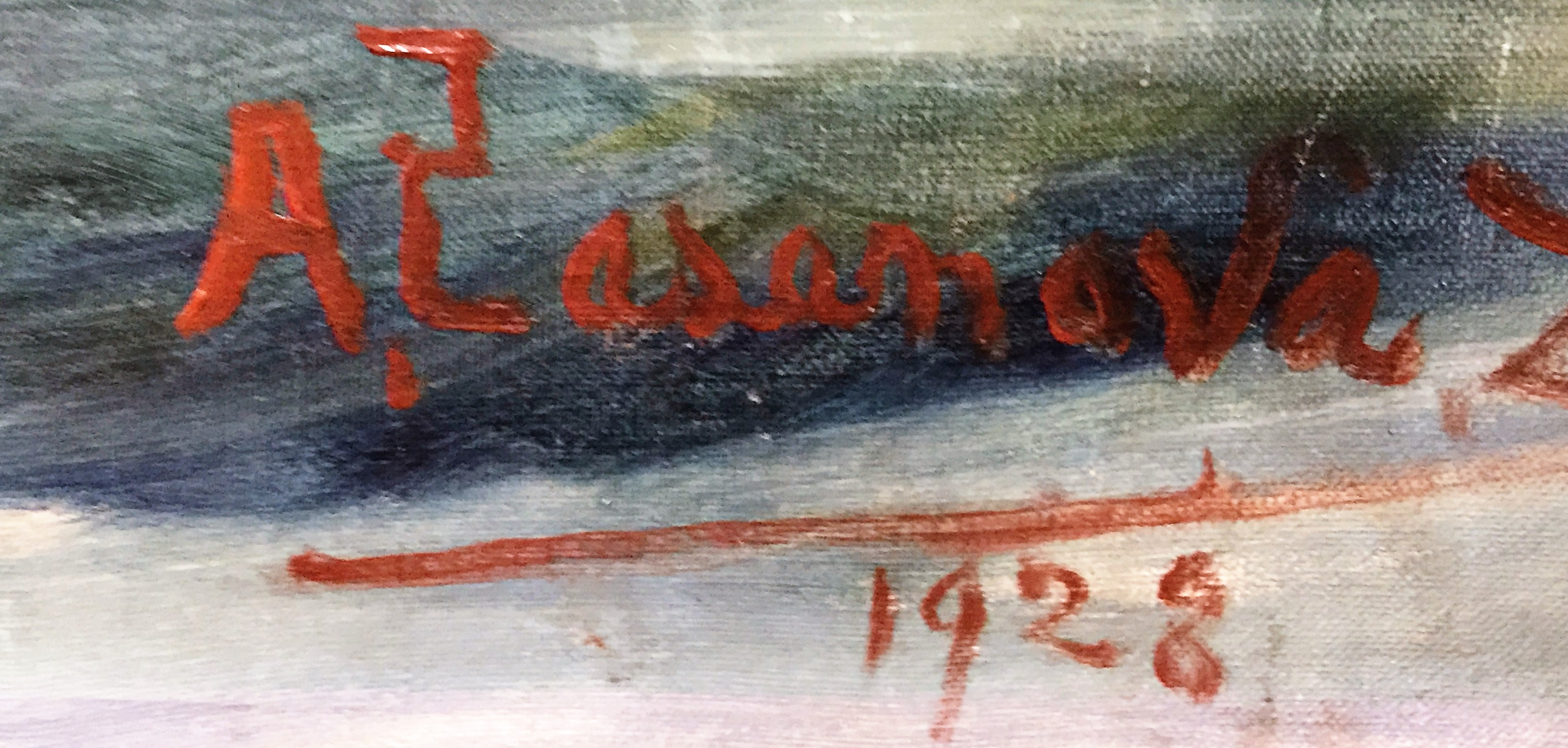

Álvaro Casanova Zenteno (21 November 1857 – 25 May 1939) was a prominent marine painter and of historic naval warfare, a statesman his art is classified as realist, expressionist, classical, and romantic.

== Biography ==
=== Family ===
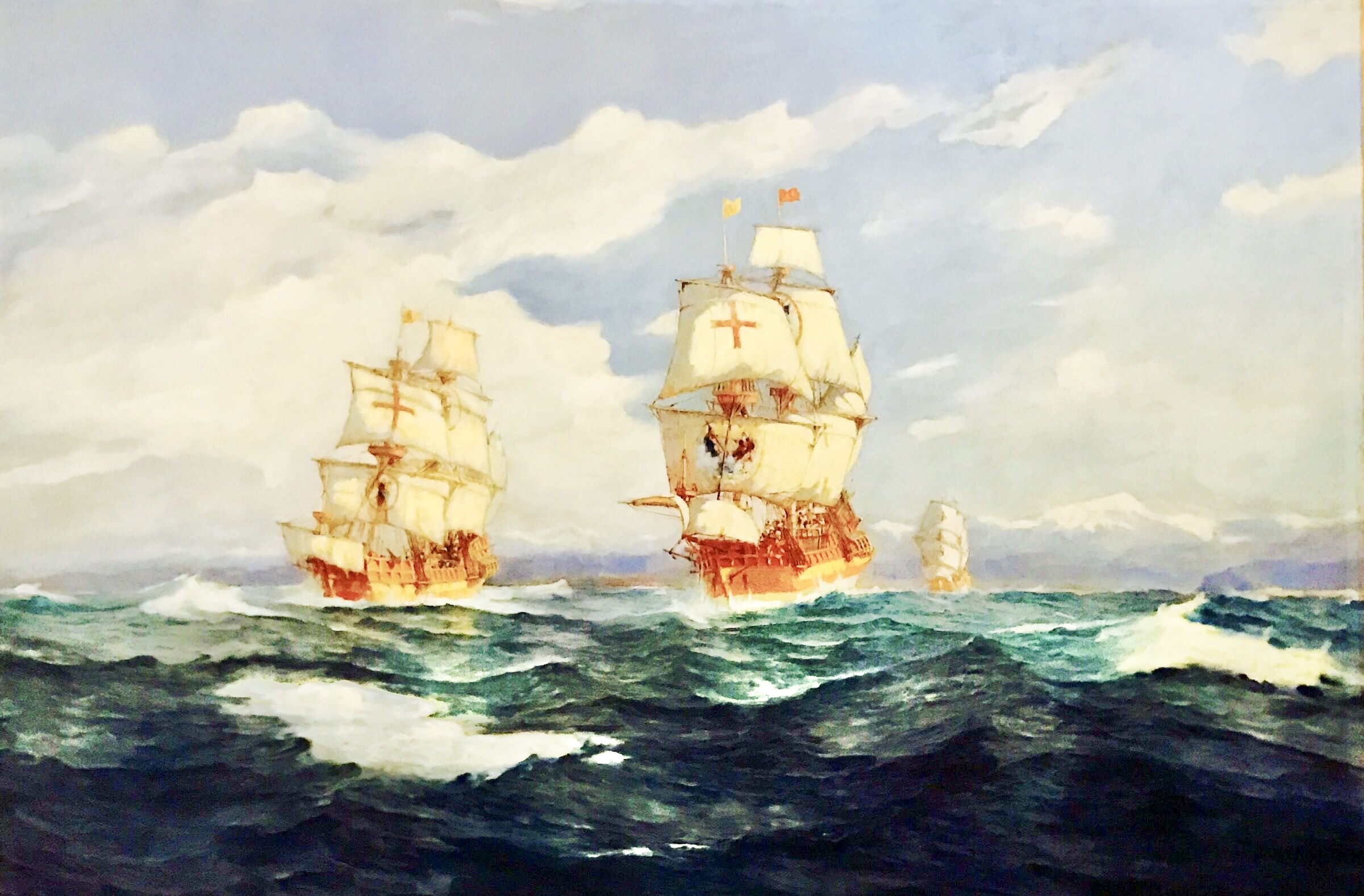
Discovery of the Strait of Magellan

Casanova Zenteno was the son of Rafael Casanova Casanova and Adelina Zenteno Gana, he was also the grandson of José Ignacio Zenteno del Pozo y Silva, who was Chile's first Minister of War and Navy organizing the Liberating Expedition of Peru. Casanova Zenteno was also the nephew of Monsignor Mariano Casanova Casanova, the third Archbishop of Santiago and a longtime friend of the Undersecretary of War and Navy Pedro Nolasco Cruz Vergara, the writer Francisco Concha Castillo and Rafael Errázuriz Urmeneta.

He was married to Cecilia Vicuña Subercaseaux, niece of the historian Benjamín Vicuña Mackenna and great-granddaughter of General Juan Mackenna O'Reilly. They had six children: Magdalena, Alfonso, Mariano, Adelina, Juan and Manuel.

=== Studies and life ===
He studied at the Valparaiso Artizan School, where he had Thomas Somerscales as a professor. Casanova Zenteno begun from early age to work in public administration. He was assistant of the Public Library and he was later the undersecretary of the ministries of Justice, War, and the Navy. He made his military career in times of the National Guard, commanding the Artillery Brigade Valparaiso, the Lontué Civic Battalion in Molina, and the Civic Artillery Regiment in Santiago.

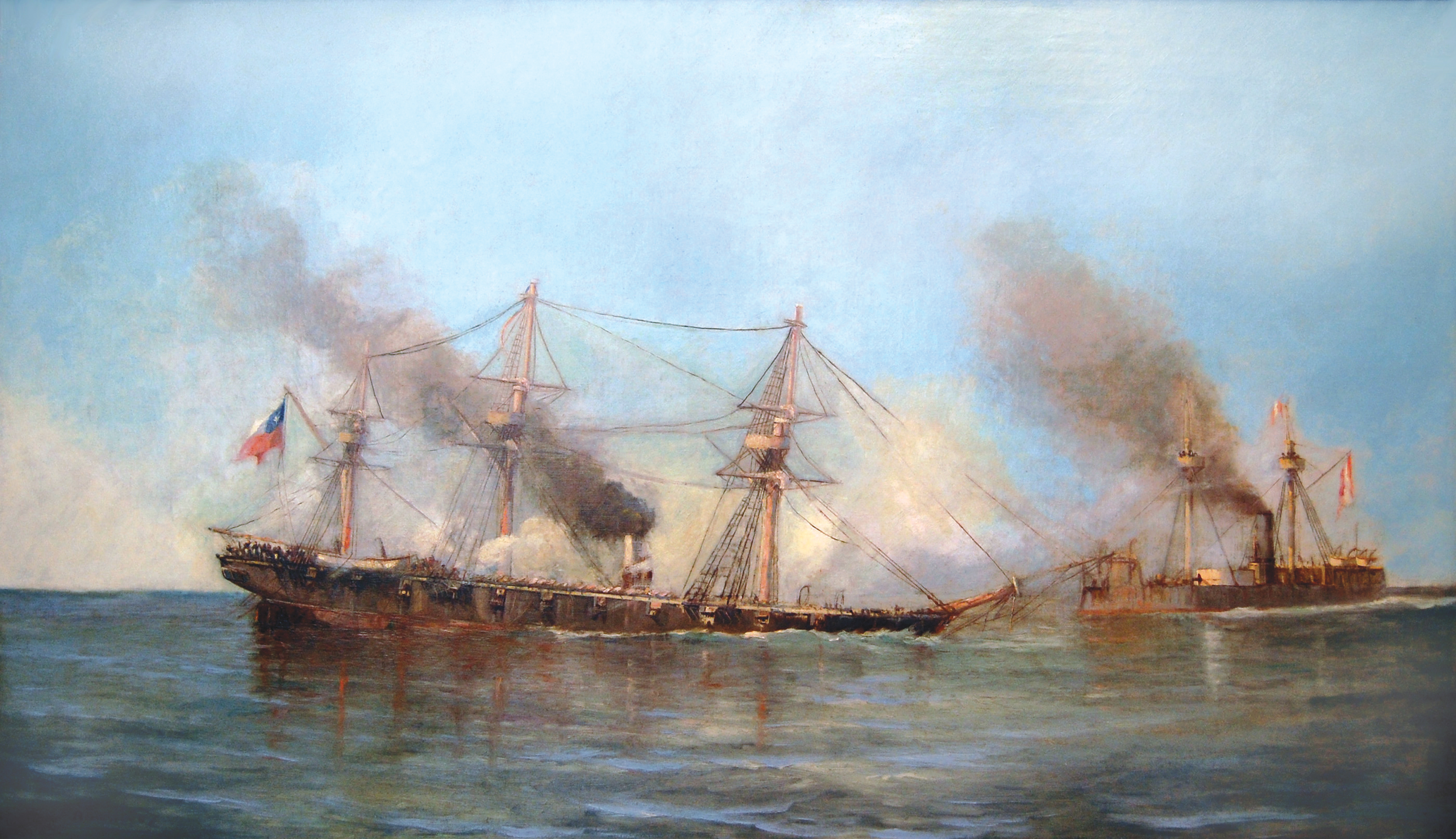
Naval battle of Iquique

In 1882, during the War of the Pacific, government sent him to France on a secret mission under the orders of the Minister of Chile in France, Alberto Blest Gana. His objective was to acquire weapons and prevent Peru from doing the same. Upon his return to Chile three years later, he took classes with the painters Pascual Ortega Portales, Onofre Jarpa Labra, and Enrique Swinburn Kirk.

Casanova Zenteno came to occupy important public positions, throughout his life he served under eleven presidents reaching the rank of undersecretary of Justice and Navy. He was also president of the National Society of Fine Arts.

== Style ==
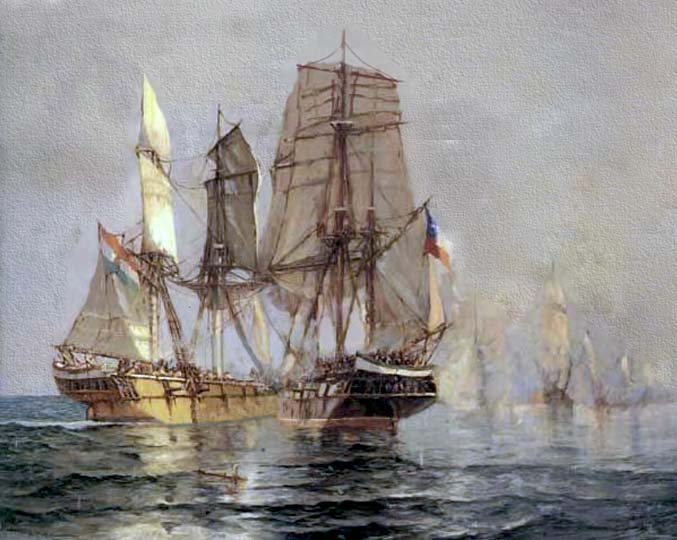
Battle of Casma

Because studied under the English sailor Thomas Somerscales in Valparaíso, he had a focus on the seas, the coastal landscape and the naval world. He showed a predilection for sailboats and high seas in particular. His art was defined by four stages, starting from realism under the influence of Thomas Somerscales, then progressing to expressionism. First National Square, an oil on canvas, is an example of his work during this period. He was aware of Chilean naval history, and he applied the knowledge he had gained during his studies in Italy on the construction of boats to paint the boats in detail during the fighting on the high seas. His painting depicting the Battle of Casma is a particular example of this.

Between 1894 and 1929 he won several national and international awards, including the Honor and Gold Medal awarded by King Alfonso XIII during the Ibero-American Exposition of 1929.

== Awards and recognitions ==
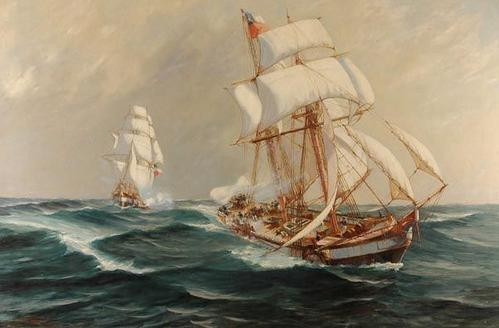
Peruviana

- 1894 Second Class Medal in Painting at the Official Hall, Santiago, Chile
- 1896 Honor Prize and First Class Medal in Painting, in the Official Hall, Santiago, Chile
- 1903 Landscape Award of the Edwards Competition, Official, Santiago, Chile
- 1908 Marcos Maturana General Contest Prize, Salon Oficial, Santiago, Chile
- 1910 Second Medal in Painting at the International Exhibition, Santiago, Chile
- 1920 Grand Prize at the International Exhibition of the Centennial of Magallanes, Punta Arenas, Chile
- 1929 Award of Honor and Gold Medal awarded by King Alfonso XIII at the International Exhibition of Seville, Spain.

== Exhibitions ==
Casanova Zenteno painted around a thousand oil paintings. His work was featured in two individual exhibitions and more than thirty collective exhibitions, which include almost all the official hall exhibitions between 1890 up to one year before he was death. Subsequently, from 1940 to the year 2000, eighteen presentations of his work were made in Chile.

=== Individual exhibitions ===
- 1917 House Eyzaguirre, Santiago.
- 1930 Sala Rivas y Calvo, Santiago.

==== After his death ====
- 1940 Retrospective, Sociedad Nacional de Bellas Artes, Santiago.
- 2007 Tribute to Álvaro Casanova Zenteno, Centro Cultural Montecarmelo, Instituto Cultural de Providencia, Santiago.

=== Collective exhibitions ===
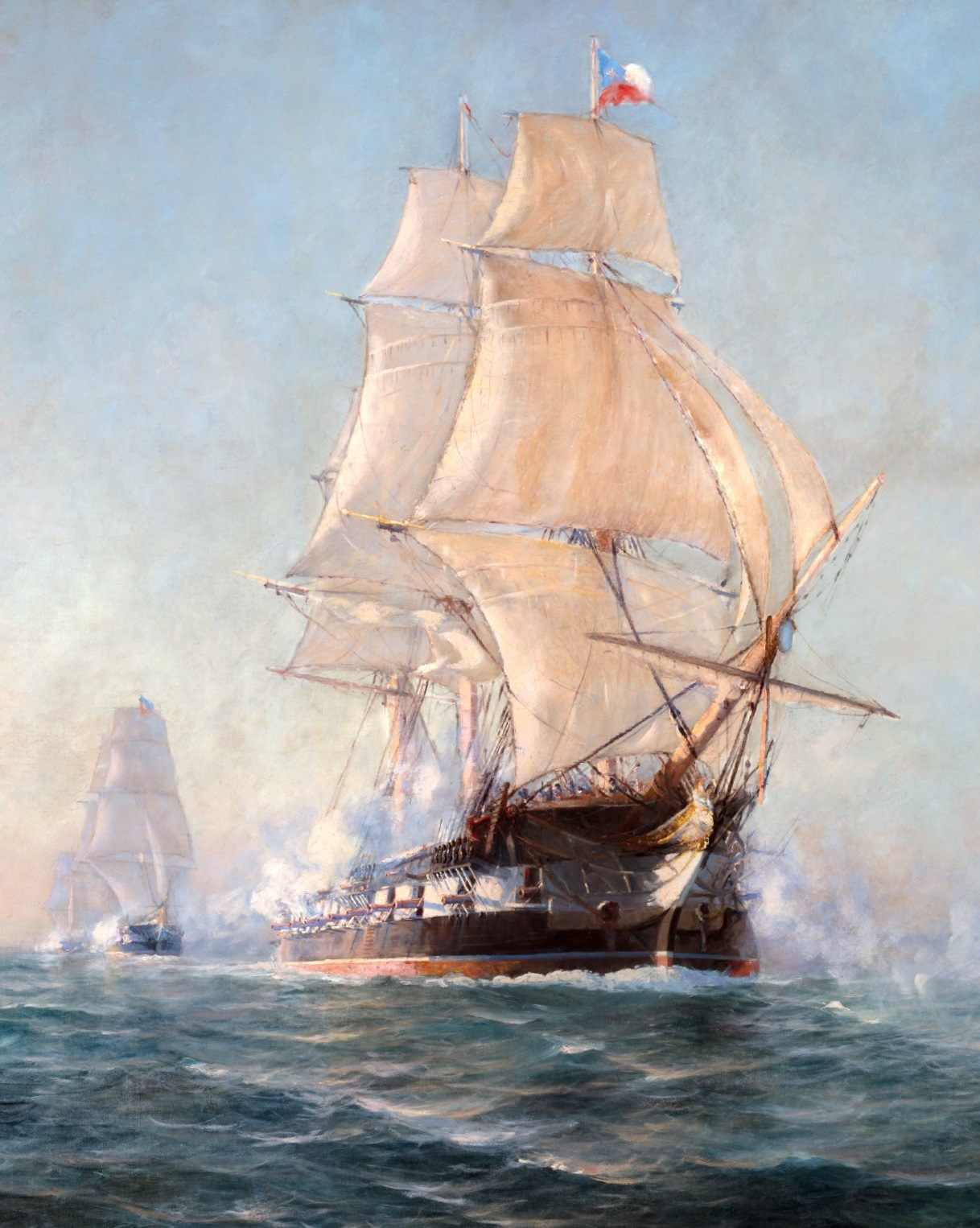
Sailing of the First Chilean National boat squad

- 1890 Official Hall, Santiago. He participated in the years 1894; 1896, 1897, 1898; 1900; 1902; 1903; 1905; 1908; 1910, 1911, 1912; 1915, 1916; 1918, 1919, 1920, 1921, 1922; 1934; 1936; 1938, 1939; 1941, 1942, 1943; 1944; 1946
- 1910 Exposición Internacional de Bellas Artes, Santiago.
- 1918 House of auctions and exhibitions, Osvaldo Araya, Concepción, Chile.
- 1920 International exhibition and Concurso Cuarto Centenario de Magallanes, Punta Arenas, Chile.
- 1922 Exhibition at the National Museum of Buenos Aires, Argentina.
- 1927 Official Exhibition of Painting in Buenos Aires, Argentina.
- 1928 Fifth Official Hall, National Society of Fine Arts, Santiago, Chile.
- 1929 International Exhibition of Seville, Spain.
- 1930 National Museum of Fine Arts Exhibition, 50th anniversary of its 1880 – 1930 Foundation, Santiago, Chile.
- 1935 Exhibition Hall of Art Bank of Chile, Santiago.
- 1936 Fourth Summer Room, Viña del Mar, Chile.
- 1937 Exhibition of Tables of the Artistic Heritage of Chillán, Liceo Fiscal de Niñas, Chillán, Chile.
- 1937 National Exhibition of Plastic Arts: IV Centenary of Valparaíso, Valparaíso, Chile.

==== After his death ====
- 1940 Chilean Art Exhibition, Buenos Aires, Argentina.
- 1969 Chilean painting panorama. Fernando Lobo Parga Collection, National Museum of Fine Arts, Santiago, Chile.
- 1972 The Coast and the Sea in Chilean Painting, Cultural Institute of Las Condes, Santiago.
- 1974 Exhibition Painters of the Sea, Exhibition Hall of MINEDUC, Santiago, Chile.
- 1974 Two Painters of the Sea, Sala La Capilla, Municipal Theater, Santiago, Chile.
- 1975 Chilean Painters Exhibition, National Television of Chile.
- 1976 The Casanova in Painting, Cultural Institute of Providencia, Santiago, Chile.
- 1978 Chilean Painting Exhibition of the Central Bank of Chile, National Museum of Fine Arts, Santiagoe.
- 1978 Exhibition of Paintings: Private Collections, Municipal Casino of Viña del Mar, Viña del Mar, Chile.
- 1978 Private collection of Guzmán Ponce paintings, Enrico Bucci Gallery and Cultural Institute of San Miguel, Santiago, Chile.
- 1981 The History of Chile in Painting. National Museum of Fine Arts, Santiago.
- 1982 Touring the Past of Chilean Painting, Cultural Institute of Las Condes, Santiago.
- 1983 Donations Exhibition 1978 – 1983, National Museum of Fine Arts, Santiago, Chile.
- 1987 Mar de Chile, Mar de Gloria, National Library, Santiago.
- 1987 Pinacoteca Exhibition Central Bank of Chile, National Museum of Fine Arts, Santiago.
- 1987 Panorama of Chilean Painting, Cultural Institute of Las Condes, Santiago.
- 1988 Chilean Painting Collection, Exhibition Hall of the International Bank, Valparaíso, Chile.
- 1995 Portraits in Chilean Painting, Cultural Institute of Providencia, Santiago.
- 2000 Chile 100 Years Visual arts. First Period 1900 – 1950, National Museum of Fine Arts, Santiago Chile.
- 2002 From Rugendas to Our Time, Valparaíso in Painting, Lord Cochrane Museum of Valparaíso, Chile.
- 2007 El Mar ... A Look at Ours, Extension Center of the Catholic University, Santiago, Chile.
- 2007 Edge Sea-High Seas, Central Bank, Santiago, Chile.
- 2008 Collection Central Bank of Chile. Carrasco Palace, Viña del Mar, Chile.

== Works in public collections ==
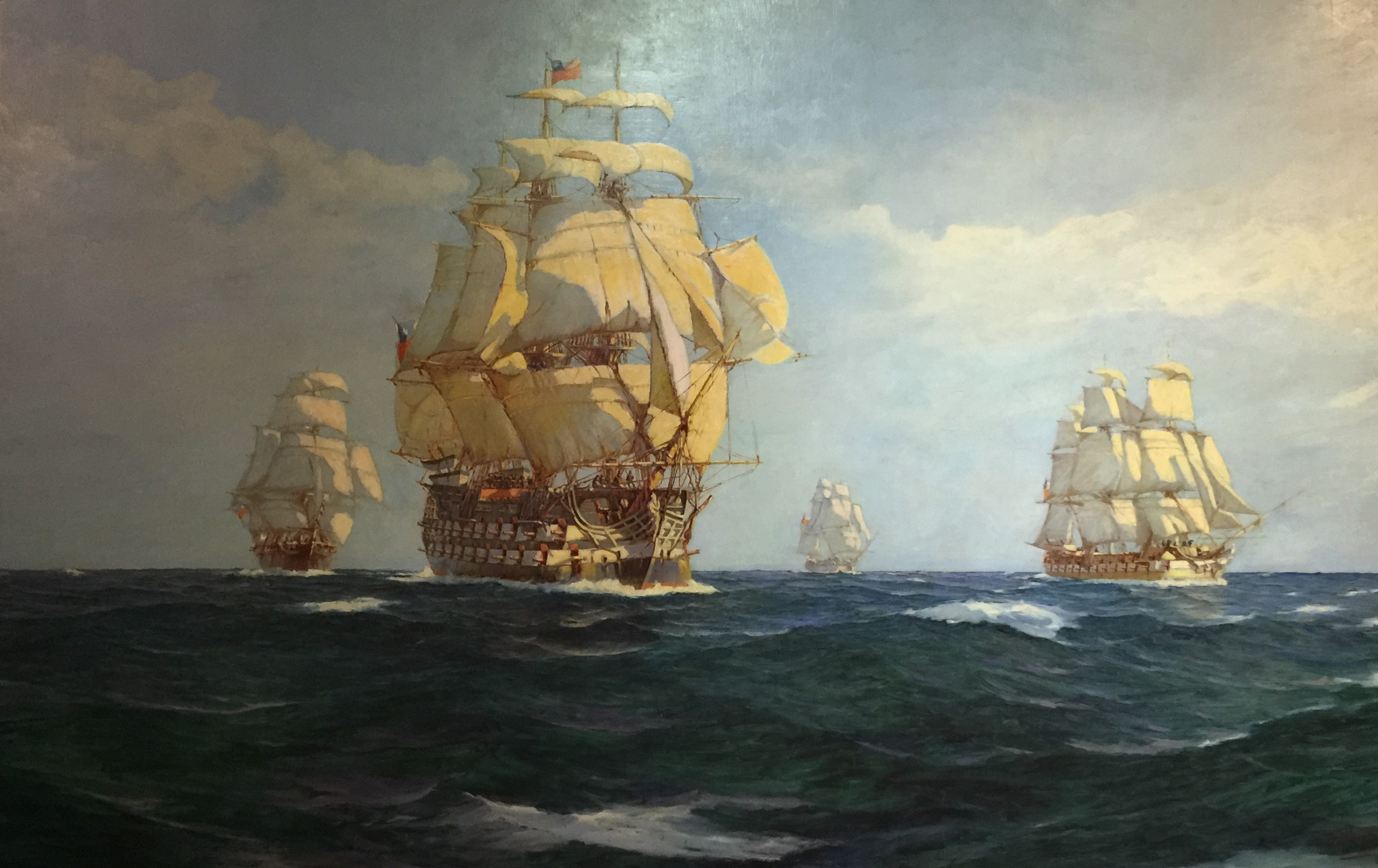
Ships of the First Chilean Navy Squadron

=== Works in the collection of the National Museum of Fine Arts ===
- The Tugboat, ink on paper, 8 x 11 cm
- Battle of Punta Gruesa, oil on cardboard, 33 x 41 cm, on loan to the National History Museum
- Battle of Casma, c. 1900, oil on canvas, 123 x 211 cm.
- Marine, oil on canvas, 108 x 70 cm;
- Battle of Casma, oil on canvas, 40 x 70 cm.

=== Works at the Central Bank of Chile ===
- Battle of Iquique, oil on canvas
- Barco al garete, oil on canvas 50 x 96 cm
- Algarete, oil on canvas, 35 x 50 cm.

=== Universidad de Concepción, Chile ===
- Marine, oil on canvas, 52 x77 cm;

=== Banco de Chile, Santiago ===
- Marine, oil on canvas, 197 x 152 cm.

=== Museum National History, Santiago ===
- Strait of Magellan, oil on canvas, 1295 x 193 cm
- Ships of the First Chilean Navy Squadron, oil on canvas, 310 x 200 cm

There are also works in the following places:

- Club de la Unión, Santiago
- Museum Naval of Valparaíso, Chile
- Naval Club of Valparaíso, Chile
- Museum O´Higginiano and Museum of Fine Arts of Talca, Chile
- Palacio de la Moneda, Santiago
- Embassy of Chile in Buenos Aires, Argentina

== Public tribute ==
In December 2014, the Municipality of Santiago installed a plaque in his honor on the wall of Castillo Forestal.

Institute of Historical Commemoration of Chile

Alvaro Casanova Zenteno

1857–1939

Painter, Architect and Diplomat

He designed this Castle for the administration of the Forest Park

He was a member of the management of parks and gardens of the Municipality of Santiago and of the commission that took care of the construction of the National Museum of Fine Arts.
He was great public servant and excellent painter of subjects of our naval history

Illustrious Municipality of Santiago
December 2014

== See also ==
- Manuel Antonio Caro
- Alberto Orrego Luco
- Eugenio Cruz Vargas
