= Maullín River =

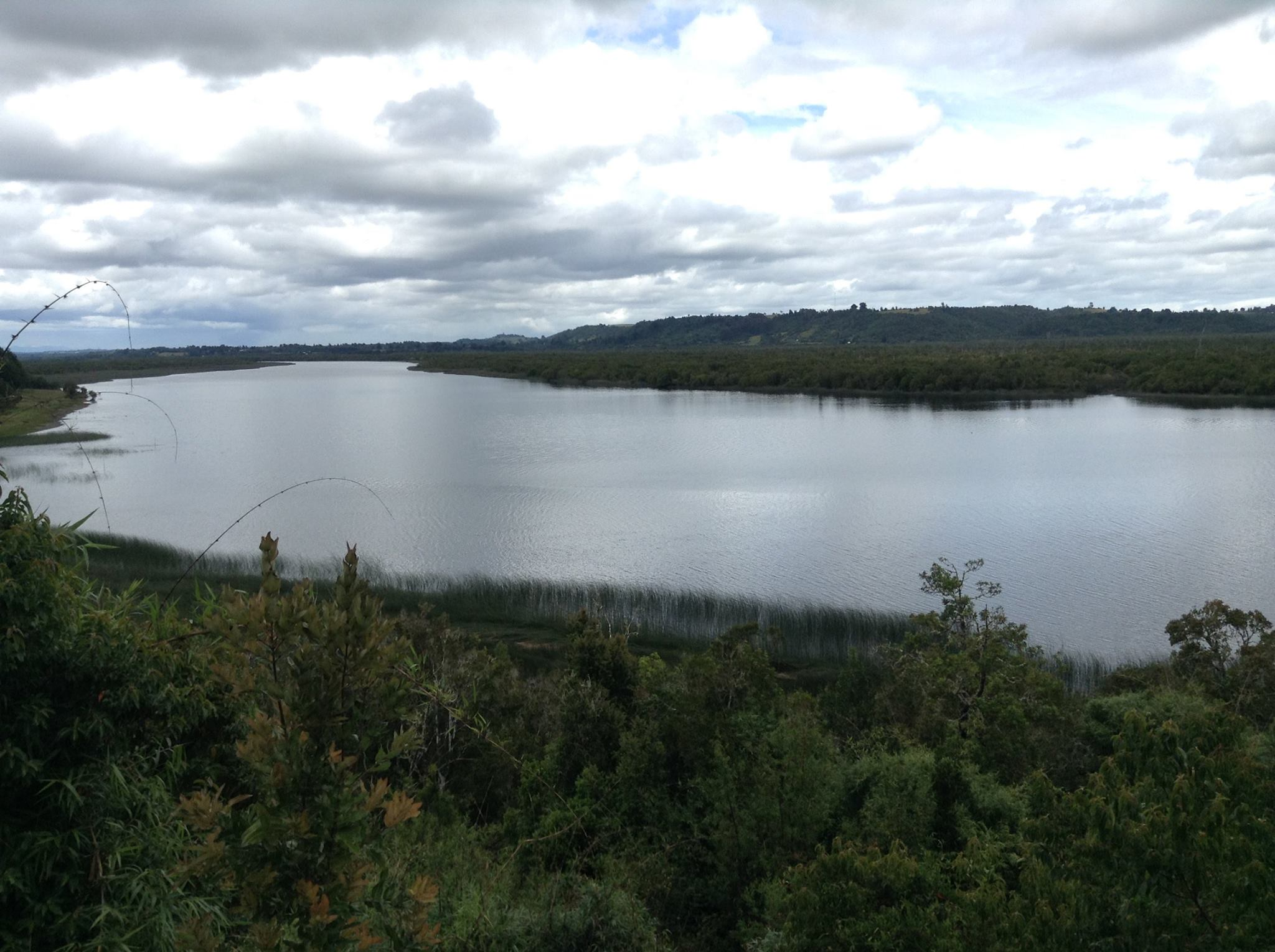

Location
- Country: Chile

Physical characteristics
- Source: Llanquihue Lake
  - coordinates: 41°15′34″S 73°00′05″W
  - elevation: 70 m (230 ft)
- Mouth: Pacific Ocean
  - coordinates: 41°36′12″S 73°39′53″W
- Length: 85 km (53 mi)
- Basin size: 3,972 km^{2} (1,534 sq mi)
- Discharge
  - average: 100 m^{3}/s (3,500 cu ft/s)

Maullín River (Spanish: Río Maullín) is a river of Chile located in the Los Lagos Region. The river originates as the outflow of Llanquihue Lake, and flows generally southwestward, over a number of small waterfalls, emptying into the Gulf of Coronados. The lower course of the river is a tidal estuary. The wetlands of Maullín stand out for their diversity of aquatic birds when compared to other locations of the Chilean coast. In the estuary Laguna Quenuir is the place known to have the largest diversity of bird fauna.

== History ==
Franciscan Friar Francisco Alvarez Villanueva mention in 1780 Maullín River as the limit between the Spanish possessions and the "Cunco nation" to the north.

The river was first explored extensively in 1856 and 1857 by the Chilean Navy officers Francisco Hudson and Francisco Vidal Gormaz. The area around Llanquihue Lake was settled in the second half of the 19th century by German immigrants, who received land from the government in a scheme to encourage settlement in this area.
