= Battle of Casma =

1839 battle

- Part of the War of the Confederation
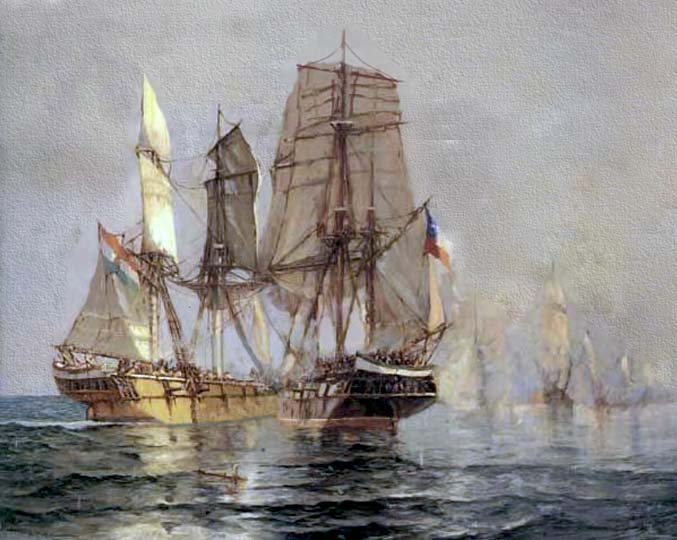
Date	12 January 1839
Location	Casma, Peru
Result	Chilean victory

Belligerents
Chile	Peru–Bolivian Confederation

Commanders and leaders
Roberto Simpson	Jean Blanchet †

Strength
2 corvettes; 1 barque	1 corvette; 1 brigantine; 1 barque; 1 schooner

Casualties and losses
8 dead; 8 wounded	13 dead; 70 prisoners; 1 brigantine captured

The Battle of Casma was a naval confrontation that occurred on 12 January 1839 during the War of the Confederation between Chile and the Peru–Bolivian Confederation. The battle took place in the bay of Casma, located off the Peruvian coast, 370 kilometers north of Callao. Although both sides claimed victory, in reality the three Chilean Navy ships, commanded by Roberto Simpson, defeated the four privateer vessels fighting on behalf of the Confederation.

The government of the Confederation had offered a bounty of 200,000 pesos for the destruction of the Chilean fleet. When the Chileans lifted the blockade of Callao, four privateer ships sallied to earn that bounty. The ships were crewed by Peruvian infantrymen and foreign, mostly French, sailors under the overall command of Juan Blanchet, a former Lieutenant of the French navy. These ships were called: Mexicana (12 guns), Peru (10 guns), Arequipeño (6 guns) and Edmond (5 guns).

The more heavily built Chilean squadron consisted of three ships: Confederación (22 guns), Santa Cruz (20 guns) and Valparaíso (20 guns). It was taking on firewood in Casma Bay when it was attacked by the privateers. They inflicted heavy casualties on the privateers and captured the Arequipeño. The commander Blanchet was among the killed. The other privateer ships escaped while flying French flags but were intercepted by a French warship; the privateer squadron was subsequently disbanded.

The Chileans gained naval supremacy in the southeastern Pacific. As a reward, Simpson was promoted to the rank of Commodore in the Chilean navy in May 1839.
