= Hans Steffen =

German geographer (1865–1936)

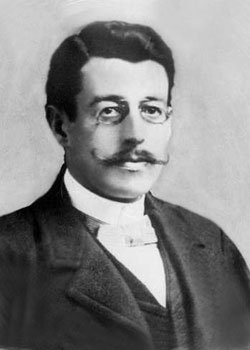
Picture of Dr. Hans Steffen in 1916

Hans Steffen Hoffman (20 July 1865, in Fürstenwerder, Prussia – 7 April 1936, in Davos, Switzerland) was a German geographer and explorer of the Aysén Region in western Patagonia.

He arrived to Chile 1885 as part of a group of 180 Germans who were recruited by the Chilean government in an effort to modernize its education system. At the time of his arrival Imperial Germany held much prestige in Chile. Steffen's subsequent explorations and work about the continental divide in Patagonia was instrumental to the Chilean argument in the 1902 Arbitral award of the Andes between Argentina and Chile.

Steffen also worked as a teacher, encyclopedist and historian. Steffen Glacier on the Northern Patagonian Ice Field is named after him.

== Biography ==
In 1889, Hans Steffen, who had obtained his doctorate in 1886, was invited by José Manuel Balmaceda to Santiago, where he became a teacher of history and geography at the Instituto Pedagógico de Chile of the University of Chile (together with the Germans Alfred Beutell, Friedrich Hanssen, Friedrich Johow, Rudolf Lenz, Reinhold von Lilienthal, and Jürgen Heinrich Schneider).

He was later contracted to join the Chilean boundary commission to explore areas disputed by Argentina in what is now the Aysén Region of Chile.

The areas to be explored were those affected by article 1 of the Boundary treaty of 1881 between Chile and Argentina:

"The boundary between Chile and the Argentine Republic is from north to south, as far as the 52nd parallel of latitude, the Cordillera de los Andes. The boundary-line shall run in that extent over the highest summits of the said Cordilleras which divide the waters, and shall pass between the sources (of streams) flowing down to either side. …"

This article led to dispute between whether the continental divide would serve as a boundary favouring Chile or the highest peaks favouring Argentina. The two interpretations coincided for most of the boundary but in the Aysén Region there were great differences. Before the explorations of Steffen, Chile had made only limited hydrographic surveys along the intricate Pacific coast of Aysén. The inland areas in dispute had been mainly explored by Argentines, notably Francisco Perito Moreno.

Between 1893 and 1894 he explored with the Chilean Navy the basins of the Palena and Puelo Rivers. He explored the Manso, Aisén and Cisnes Rivers from 1896 to 1898. He then moved on to explore the channels south of Taitao Peninsula (46°S) mapping and describing the Gulf of Penas, and then exploring and naming Baker, Bravo and Pascua Rivers. He also crossed the Isthmus of Ofqui. Following the Pascua River, Steffen and his companions were the first to arrive at O'Higgins Lake from the Pacific as well the first to explore its western arms.

== See also ==
- Francisco Hudson
- Francisco Perito Moreno
- Juan Brüggen
- Francisco Vidal Gormaz

== Sources ==
- Hans Steffen Hoffman
- Carlos Sanhueza Cerda: El objetivo del Instituto Pedagógico no es el de formar geógrafos. Hans Steffen y la transferencia del saber geográfico alemán a Chile. 1893-1907. In: Historia (PUC, Santiago de Chile), Vol. 45 (2012), S. 171–197.
- Thomas Gerdes, Stefan Schmidt: Hans Steffen (1865–1936). Grenzerfahrungen eines deutschen Geografen in Chile (Ibero-Bibliographien, Vol. 10). Ibero-Amerikanisches Institut, Berlin 2016, ISBN 978-3-935656-66-5.
