= Francisco Hudson =

Chilean naval officer and hydrographer

Francisco Hudson Cárdenas (July 1, 1826 in Curaco de Vélez, Chile – March, 1859) was a Chilean naval officer and hydrographer notable for his explorations of Southern Chile and Chilean Patagonia. Hudson sailed on behalf of the Chilean government to Peru and Ecuador several times, and assisted with the immigration of German colonists to Valdivia. He gained notoriety for his exploration of the Maullín River, Roca Remolinos, and the channels of Aysén Region. Hudson was interested in investigating the possible existence of a sailing route through internal waters from the Chiloé Archipelago to the Straits of Magellan, but came to realize that the Isthmus of Ofqui made this impossible. His hydrographic works laid the groundwork for Hans Steffen's exploration of Aysén Region in late 19th century.

== Biography ==
Hudson was born in the town of Curaco de Vélez in Quinchao Island of Chiloé Archipelago to Santiago (possibly a translation of "James") Hudson and Juana Cárdenas. Hudson studied at the Maritime School of Ancud (Escuela Naútica de Ancud). After schooling, he was transferred to the frigate Chile under the command of Roberto Simpson. He later explored the Maullín River with Francisco Vidal Gormaz in an unsuccessful attempt to reach its source at Llanquihue Lake. Hudson and Vidal Gormaz reached a point where he observed "three cascades" in the river, after which they turned back. Gormaz proposed logging the river and using it to transport wood to the German settlers that had already settled in the shores of Llanquihue Lake. Hudson made a later unsuccessful attempt to reach the "three cascades" from Llanquihue Lake, and was preparing a new expedition when he was ordered instead to investigate Roca Remolinos (lit. "whirls rock"), a dangerous underwater rock in Chacao Channel.

After reading Sailing Directions for South America by Robert FitzRoy, Francisco Hudson realized the possibility of the existence of a route that would allow traffic through the channels of Patagonia without the need of sailing through the open sea at Tres Montes Peninsula. Sailing on the open sea in the roaring 40s was dangerous and finding an inner passage would significantly improve the traffic between the Chilean settlement of Punta Arenas in the Straits of Magellan on one hand and Chiloé and Central Chile on the other.

In 1857, Hudson led an expedition to find the possible inner passage he had inferred from FitzRoy's writings. He sailed from Ancud with the brigantine Janaqueo and the sloop-of-war Emprendedora. Janaqueo had to return soon after due to poor maintenance after many years of service. The expedition sailed through Moraleda Channel to San Rafael Lagoon, where they explored the Isthmus of Ofqui on foot without finding any passage to the San Quintín Bay of Gulf of Penas. Hudson was accompanied in his travels by young German immigrant Francisco Fonck.

After this expedition, he mapped Dalcahue Channel near his hometown and returned to the Maullín River with Vidal Gormaz.

=== Death ===
In 1858, Hudson was given command of the brigantine Pizarro and sailed south from Valparaíso with the governor of Punta Arenas on board. In Punta Arenas, he met his brother-in-law Martín Aguayo who commanded the brigantine Meteoro. As they both planned to sail north again, they decided to sail together. They tried to sail through the western section of the Strait of Magellan, but due to the strong winds, they chose to sail eastward first and enter the Pacific through Cape Horn. After having passed the Le Maire Strait, the two ships were separated in a storm. While the more robust Meteoro managed to return to Punta Arenas for repairs, Pizarro and Hudson were never seen again. On July 1, 1860, the government issued a decree declaring him dead.

== Legacy ==
Hudson contributed substantially to the exploration and mapping of southern Chile, improving navigation around Chiloé Archipelago and in the Patagonian channels through his maps. His works were essential for the later inland exploration of Aysén Region by Hans Steffen. Hudson also outlined several projects to improve fluvial and maritime traffic but most of them were never applied. Hudson had Mount Hudson, the most active volcano of Aysén Region, named after him as well as one of several headlands in at the entrance of San Rafael Lagoon and the Oceanographic and Hydrographic service of the Chilean Navy has one of its buildings named "Don Francisco Hudson".

== Sources ==
- Sepúlveda, Jorge. Francisco Hudson, un destacado marino poco conocido en nuestra historia, Revista de Marina.
