= Caulín Bay =

Bay located in the northern end of Chiloé Island, Chile

Caulín Bay is a bay located in the northern end of Chiloé Island, Chile. The bay opens to the north to Chacao Channel.
