= Chilean Navy Archive and Historical Library =

Chilean library

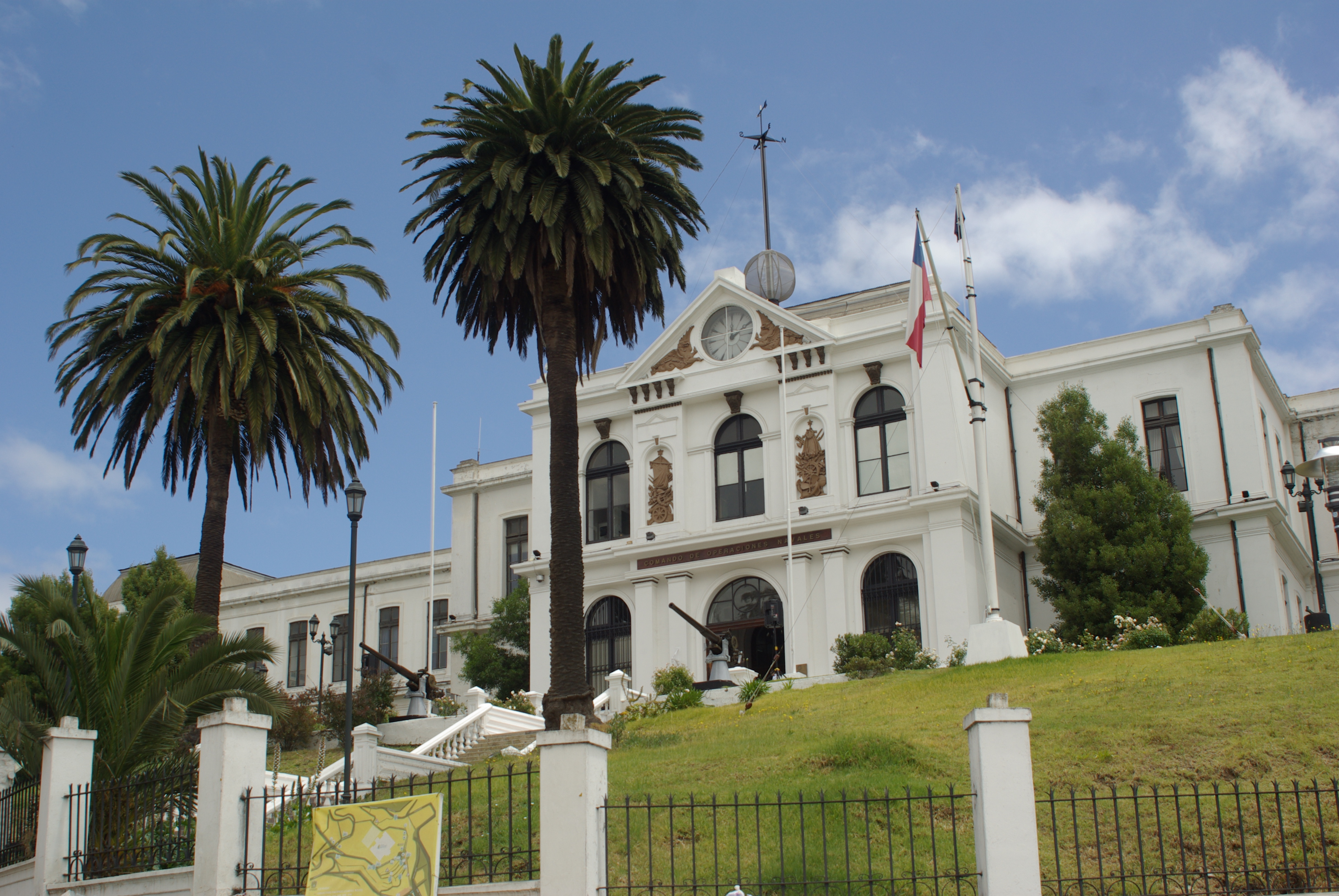
- Formation: 1997
- Type: Public institution
- Location: Valparaíso, Chile
- Products: Conservation and dissemination of naval historical documents
- Owner: Chilean Navy
- Key people: Cecilia Guzmán Bastías, Librarian
- Website: www.armada.cl/archivo-y-biblioteca-historica/

The Chilean Navy Historical Archive and Library (in Spanish: Archivo Histórico y Biblioteca de la Armada de Chile) is an organization founded in 1997 dedicated to the preservation, collection, and restoration of historical materials related to the Chilean Navy. Its headquarters are located next to the National Maritime Museum of Chile, on Artillería Hill in Valparaíso.

== History ==
In 1994 and during the transition to democracy, the Commander-in-Chief of the Navy, Jorge Martínez Busch, highlighted the importance of documenting and conserving the Navy's historical materials. This initiative led to the launch of the "Iridium Project" in 1995, aimed at establishing an archive and library dedicated to Chilean maritime history.

The archive and library are situated within the historic former Naval Academy building, which currently also functions as the Chilean Maritime Museum.

== Collection ==
The collection comprises official naval records, historical manuscripts, maps, photographs, and rare books that chronicle Chile's maritime history from the colonial era to the present. It serves as a vital resource for researchers, historians, and the general public interested in Chilean naval heritage and maritime operations. The archive supports scholarly research on topics such as naval warfare, shipbuilding, maritime exploration, and Chile's involvement in regional and international maritime affairs.

== Digital repository ==
Since 2012, the Chilean Navy Archive and Historical Library has developed a digital repository to preserve and provide access to its extensive maritime heritage. Spearheaded by bibliotecologist Cecilia Guzmán Bastías in collaboration with Captain Carlos Tromben Corbalán and the technology firm INFODI, the initiative began digitizing key documents, photographs, and historical records.

By 2018, the repository featured over 8,500 annotated photographs of naval vessels, aircraft, weaponry, personnel, and monuments dating from the mid-19th to late 20th century. It also included nearly 100 documents and several videos, encompassing materials from both official naval archives and private collections. The digital archive continues to expand, aiming to increase accessibility to Chile's naval history through modern technologies.
