= Francisco Vidal Gormaz =

Chilean naval officer and hydrographer

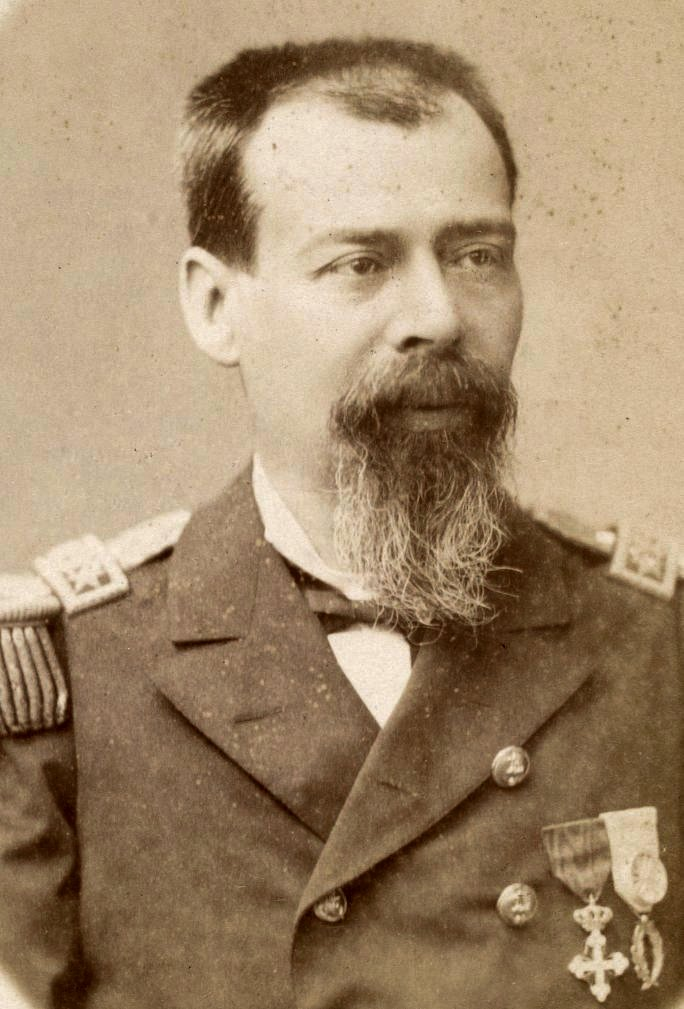
Vidal Gormaz en 1885

Francisco Vidal Gormaz (July 1, 1837 in Santiago, Chile – February 5, 1907) was a Chilean naval officer and hydrographer who explored the coasts of Chile including some river systems and lakes. During the 1850s he explored and surveyed several times Maullín River with Francisco Hudson. Before being lost at sea in 1859 Hudson is thought to have been a major influence on Vidal Gormaz. He participated in the Occupation of the Araucanía performing reconnaissance missions in the coasts of Arauco and Toltén. In 1863, he was named director of the Maritime School of Ancud (Escuela Maritima de Ancud). In 1874, he became the first director of the newly created Hydrographic Office (Oficina Hidrográfica). In 1884, he became General Inspector of Lighthouses and participated in the International Meridian Conference. Because of his neutrality during the 1891 Chilean Civil War he was removed from his post as director of the Hydrographic Office. He was named assistant at the Sea Ministry (Spanish: Ministerio de Marina) in 1894 and retired from the navy in 1899.

While making a hydrographic survey around Chiloé Archipelago in 1871 Vidal Gormaz obtained information from locals on the effects of the 1837 Valdivia earthquake. His explorations of the southern Patagonian archipelagoes made him critical of the work of Robert FitzRoy and Charles Darwin whom according to him had failed acknowledge the importance of the Patagonian islands.

== See also ==
- Media related to Francisco Vidal Gormaz at Wikimedia Commons
- Bernhard Eunom Philippi
- Roberto Simpson
- Hans Steffen

== Sources ==
- La Tercera - Icarito
- Armada de Chile
