= Roberto Simpson Winthrop =

Chilean admiral (1799–1877)

Roberto Simpson
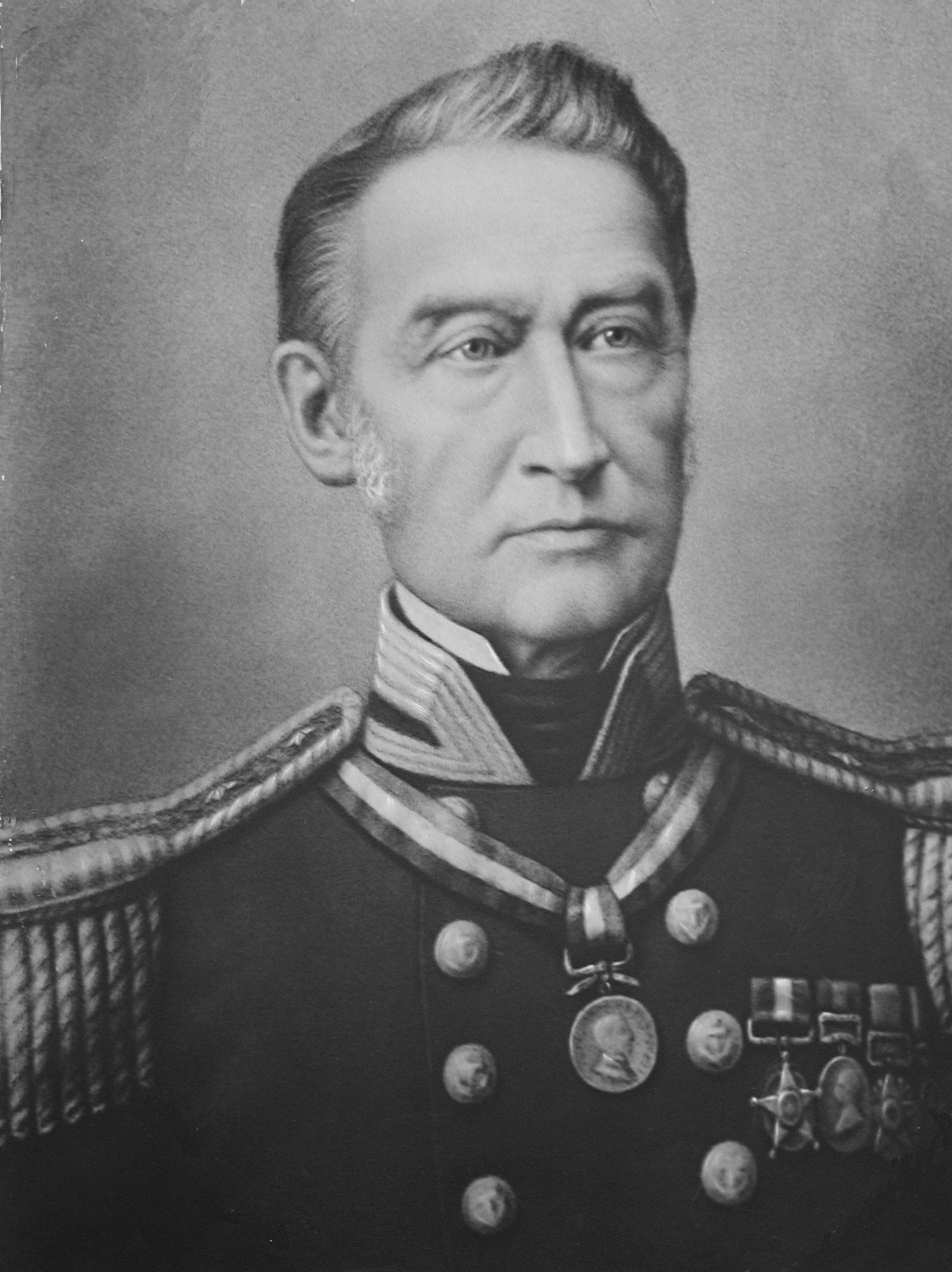
- Born: Robert Simpson Winthrop; 14 December 1799; Hampshire, Great Britain
- Died: 23 December 1877 (aged 78); Valparaíso, Chile
- Military career
- Allegiance: Chile
- Branch: Chilean Navy
- Service years: 1818–1871
- Rank: Rear-admiral
- Conflicts: Peruvian Independence War; First siege of Callao; Second siege of Callao; Chilean Independence War; Battle of Pudeto; Battle of Bellavista; War of the Confederation; Raid on Guayaquil and Callao; Battle of Islay; Battle of Casma

Roberto Simpson Winthrop (14 December 1799 – 23 December 1877), was a sailor of English origin, nationalized Chilean, who made a career in the Chilean Navy from 1818 and reached the rank of rear-admiral in 1852. Distinguished himself during the Spanish American wars of independence and the War of the Confederation. He was also founder of the Simpson family in Chile, initiator of the first hydrographic works in the country, senator and diplomat.

== Biography ==
=== Early life ===
Robert Simpson was born in Hampshire, arriving in Spanish Chile as a midshipman on the sloop Rose under command of Lord Cochrane, who was involved in the formation of the Chilean Navy during the Chilean War of Independence.

By 1821, Simpson was already a second lieutenant in the Chilean Navy, and in the same year during the Peruvian War of Independence he participated in the capture of the Spanish ships Resolución, San Fernando and Milagro in Callao, being promoted to captain on 7 October 1821. Admiral Cochrane gave Simpson command of the Araucano, ordered him to Acapulco to harass Spanish shipping, and from there move on to California to purchase supplies.

While in port, a British officer convinced the foreign crew to take over the ship and leave for Australia, leaving Simpson behind. Back in Chile in 1824, Simpson was given the command of the Voltaire, and together with the Galvarino under the command of Captain Cobbet maintained the blockade of the Chiloé Archipelago for 4 months. In 1825, he participated in another blockade of Callao under Admiral Manuel Blanco Encalada.

Simpson participated actively in all the naval encounters of the war of independence in Chile and Peru between 1825 and 1826. When the Chilean fleet was dispersed in 1826, Simpson went into the reserve and took command of the Peruvian ship Congreso. In 1827, he took command of a Mexican ship also named Congreso. He finally returned to Chile in 1829 and named the Naval Governor of Coquimbo. From 1830 to 1836, Simpson commanded the Aquiles and in December 1834 became the first Chilean hydrographer.

=== War of the Confederation ===
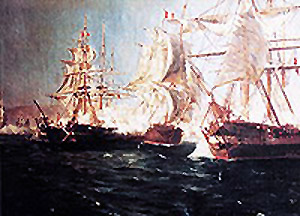
Naval Battle of Casma

At the time of the War of the Confederation in 1836, Simpson was in command of the Valparaíso, the flagship of Admiral Encalada. On 26 January 1837, he was named commander of the Aquiles, and his first mission was to notify the government of the Peru-Bolivian Confederation of the Chilean government's repudiation of the Treaty of Paucarpata. Later, he cruised the Peruvian coast and was in charge of disturbing their commerce, and captured the Confederación, taking its command.

On 12 January 1839, while the Chilean squadron under his command was at Casma taking provisions, the Confederación was attacked by the Confederate fleet under the command of the French sailor Juan Blanchet. At the naval Battle of Casma, the Chileans had a resounding victory when during the battle Blanchet was killed and the Confederate ship Arequipeño was sunk, but not before the Chilean fleet had been badly battered. Nonetheless, the defeat of the Confederate fleet at Casma by the smaller Chilean squadron left Chile in absolute control of the southeastern Pacific Ocean. Simpson was promoted to commodore on 8 May 1839.

=== Later life ===
After the dissolution of the Peru-Bolivian Confederation at the Battle of Yungay in 1839, Simpson returned to Chile along with the fleet. Between 1840 and 1852, he had a long and varied career in the Chilean Navy, rising as high as becoming General Commander of the Navy twice. In 1848, he was in command of the Chile, a frigate used as Chile's training ship where he had Francisco Hudson as a subordinate.

On 15 January 1852, Simpson adopted Chilean nationality and was elected Senator. That year he travelled to England to supervise the construction of the Esmeralda, becoming its first commander upon completion. In 1853, he became a rear admiral and continued his naval career until 1871, when he retired after 53 years in the Chilean Navy.

Simpson died in Valparaíso on 23 December 1877.

== Personal life ==
Simpson married twice, first to Mercedes Baeza, a Chilean woman with whom he had two sons and two daughters. His son Enrique Simpson Baeza joined the Chilean Navy in 1851 and became an admiral.

After his first wife's death, Simpson married Catalina Searle in 1843, with whom Simpson had another four children. One of his sons from this marriage, Juan Manuel, also joined the Navy and also became an admiral.

== Sources ==
- Antonio López, M. (1889). Recuerdos Historicos de la Guerra de Independencia (in Spanish). Bogotá: La Comercial. ISBN 9780265355923.
- López Urrutia, C. (1969). Historia de la Marina de Chile (in Spanish). Santiago: Andres Bello. ISBN 9780615185743.
