= Chilean Navy =

Branch of the Chilean Armed Forces

- Armada de Chile
- Coat of arms of the Chilean Navy
- Founded: 1817; 209 years ago
- Country: Chile
- Type: Navy
- Role: Naval warfare
- Size: 25,000 personnel 133 vessels (see list)
- Part of: Chilean Armed Forces
- Headquarters: Edificio Armada de Chile; Valparaíso
- Mottos: Vencer o Morir ("Victory or Death")
- Colors: Navy blue White
- March: Brazas a ceñir (English: "Braces to be close-hauled")
- Anniversaries: 21 May, Día de las Glorias Navales (Navy Day)
- Engagements: Chilean War of Independence; Peruvian War of Independence; War of the Confederation; Chincha Islands War; War of the Pacific; Panama Crisis of 1885; 1891 Chilean Civil War; Itata incident Chilean naval mutiny of 1931; World War II; 1973 Chilean coup d'état Beagle Conflict

Commanders
- Commander-in-Chief of the Navy: Admiral Fernando Cabrera Salazar
- Notable commanders: Lord Thomas Cochrane; Robert Winthrop Simpson; Manuel Blanco Encalada; Juan José Latorre; Arturo Prat; Carlos Condell; Patricio Lynch; Jorge Montt; John Williams Wilson; Juan Williams Rebolledo; José Toribio Merino

Insignia
- Ensign

- Jack

- Roundel

The Chilean Navy (Spanish: Armada de Chile) is the naval warfare service branch of the Chilean Armed Forces. It is under the Ministry of National Defense. Its headquarters are at Edificio Armada de Chile, Valparaíso.

== History ==
=== Origins and the Wars of Independence (1817–1830) ===
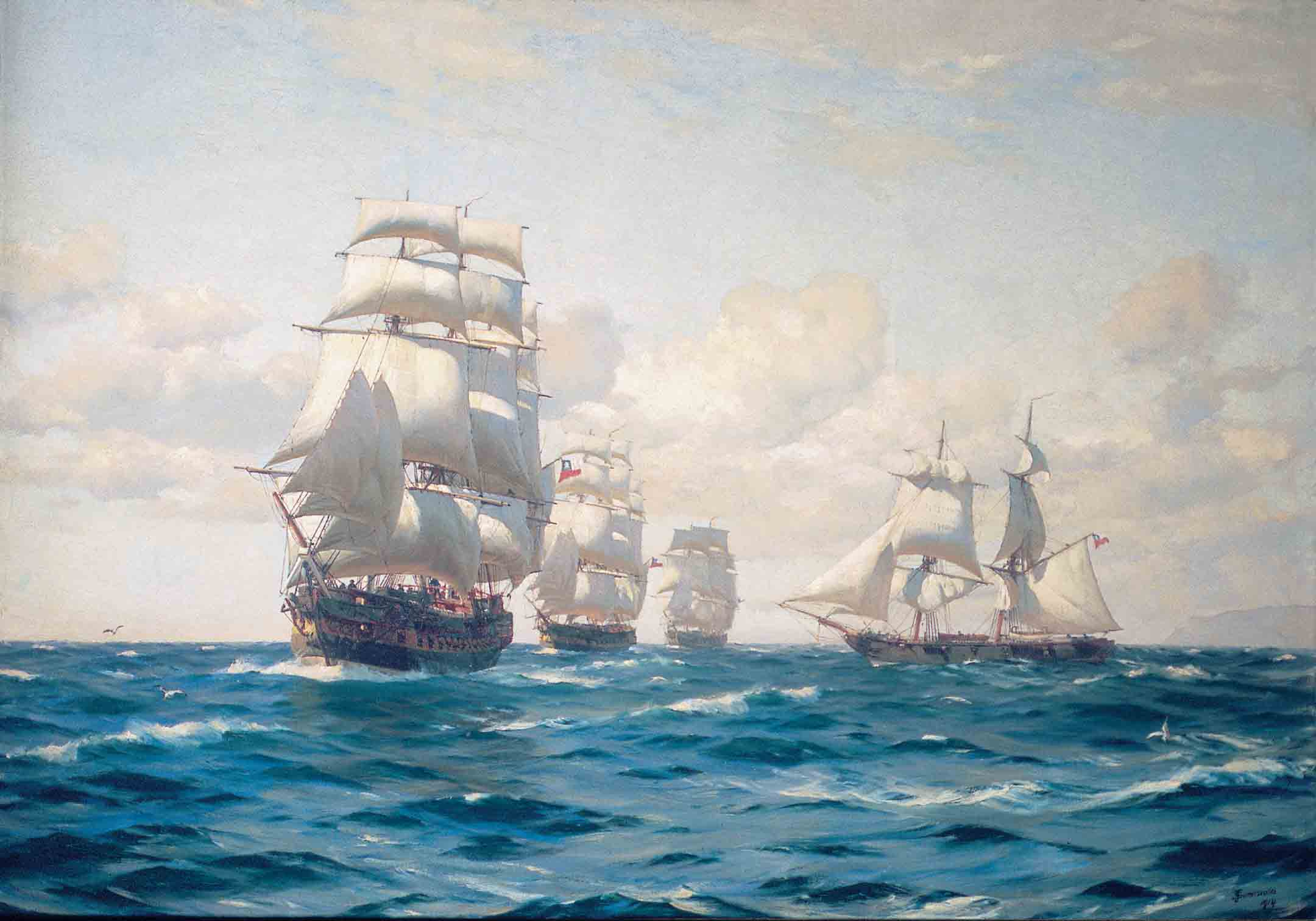
The Chilean Squadron sails off for Perú in 1820

The origins of the Chilean Navy date back to 1817, when General Bernardo O'Higgins prophetically declared after the Chilean victory at the Battle of Chacabuco that a hundred such victories would count for nothing if Chile did not gain control of the sea.

This led to the development of the Chilean Navy, and the first legal resolutions outlining the organization of the institution were created. Chile's First National Fleet and the Academy for Young Midshipmen, which was the predecessor of the current Naval Academy, were founded, as well as the Marine Corps and the Supply Commissary.

The first commander of the Chilean Navy was Manuel Blanco Encalada. The British naval officer Lord Cochrane, who formerly had been a captain in the Royal Navy, was hired to organize and command the Chilean navy. Cochrane recruited large numbers of British, Irish and American sailors to crew the navy. He became a key figure in the war against Spanish forces in Peru, and was instrumental in taking control of the fortresses of Valdivia, though he failed in his attempt to conquer Chiloé Island.

In March 1824, the Chilean Navy and Army undertook an expedition to expel the Spanish from Chiloé Archipelago. An expedition was dispatched to Chiloé Island, but it ended in failure when the Chilean Army led by Jorge Beauchef was defeated at the Battle of Mocopulli. Only after Ramón Freire's Chiloé expedition in 1826 did the royalist forces at Chiloé, under the command of Antonio de Quintanilla, surrender and Chiloé joined the new Chilean nation.

=== Age of exploration, territorial expansion, and wars (1830–1885) ===
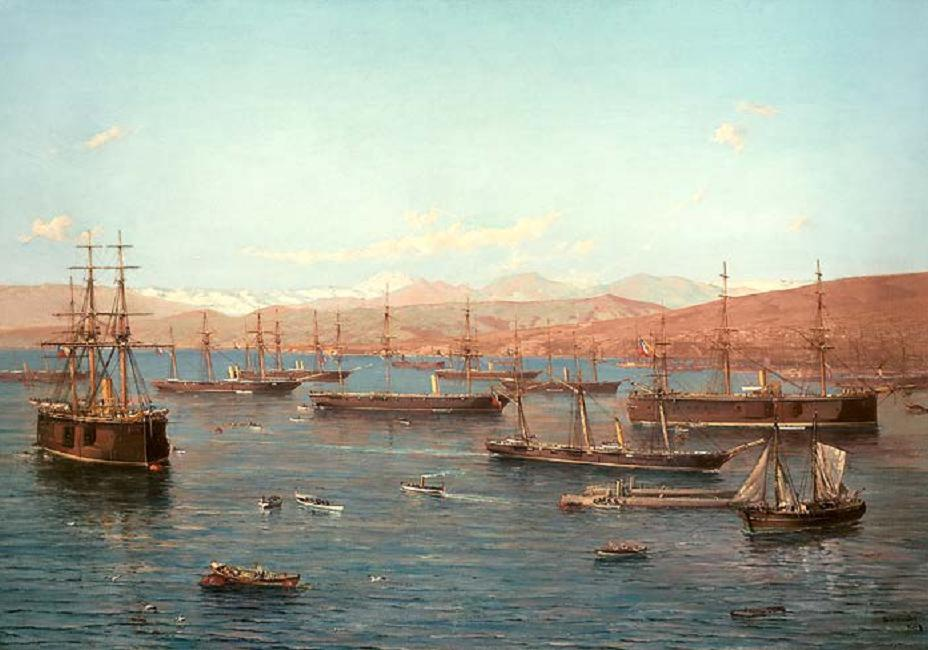
The Chilean Squadron anchored in Valparaíso's bay in 1879

After the wars of independence, a series of conflicts demonstrated the importance of the navy to the nation. First of these conflicts were the War of the Confederation (1836–1839), the Chincha Islands War (1864–1866), and the War of the Pacific (1879–1883). The founding of Fuerte Bulnes in the Strait of Magellan marked the starting point of a series of Chilean Navy explorations, led by navy hydrographers, such as Francisco Vidal Gormaz and Francisco Hudson, in the unknown zone between the Strait of Magellan and Chiloé. To deal with this new area of activity, the navy founded in 1874 the Hydrographic Office, whose first director was Francisco Vidal Gormaz.

Chilean war hero and martyr Arturo Prat is regarded as the ultimate example of the commitment of the navy to its country, after his death while leading a boarding party onto the enemy ironclad Huáscar at the naval battle of Iquique on 21 May 1879, during the War against Peru and Bolivia. The anniversary of this battle is celebrated every year as a public holiday called Día de las Glorias Navales. Prat is also considered to be one of the co-founders of the Naval Seaman Training School in 1868, which began operating a year later, and was one of the Naval Academy's finest graduate officers that in 1943 it became the National Naval School "Arturo Prat" in his honor.

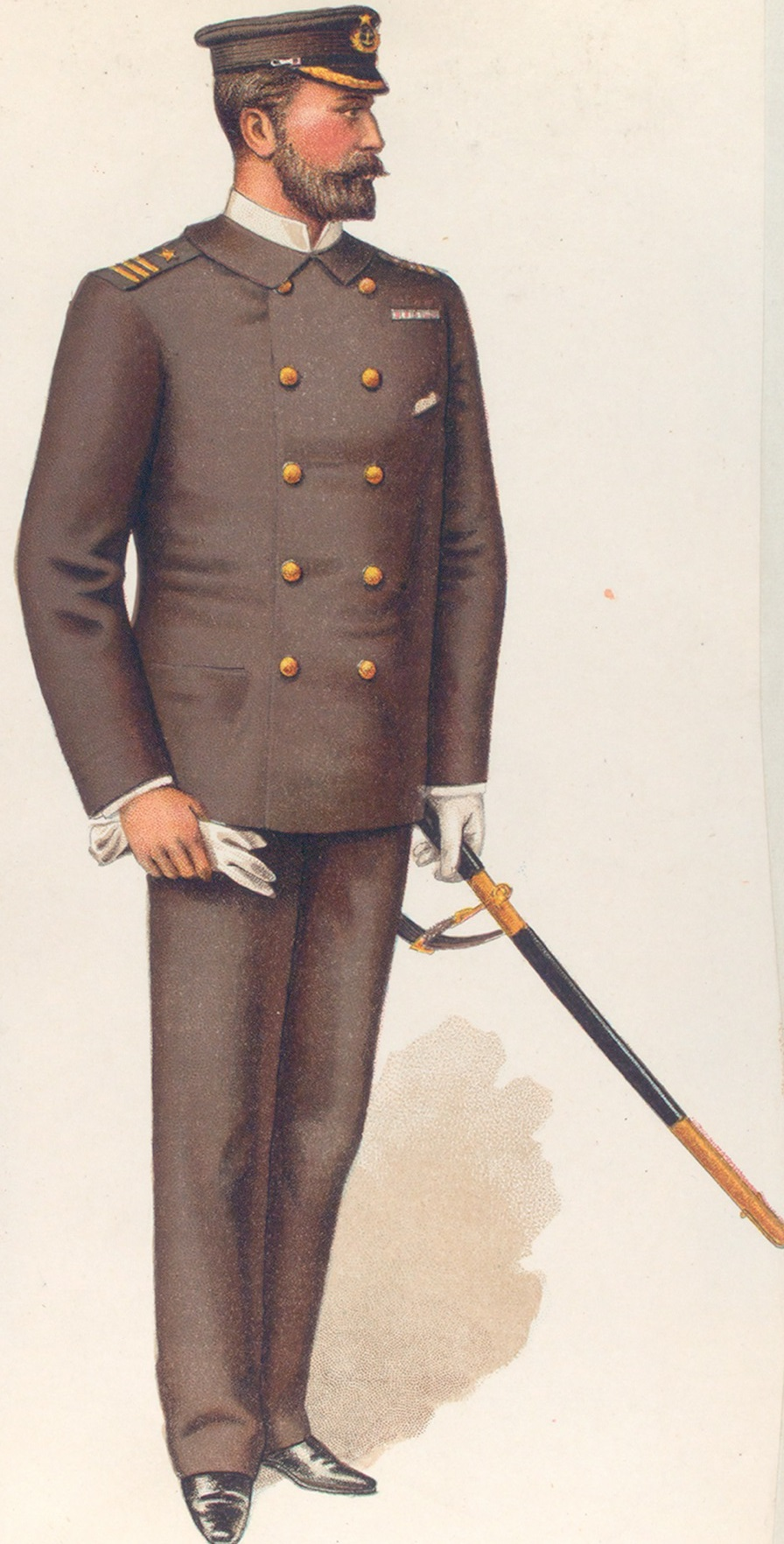
Chilean Navy officer's uniform, circa 1890

The navy further distinguished itself during the Battle of Pisagua in 1879, led by both the Navy and the Marine Artillery Groups and Marine Infantry, the world's first modern military landing operation, that resulted in Chilean victories in other parts of Peru's Tarapacá region, and resulted to its annexation by Chile.

After navy visits to Easter Island in 1875 and 1887, Chilean navy officer Policarpo Toro managed to negotiate an incorporation of the island into Chile with native Rapanui in 1888. By occupying Easter Island, Chile joined the imperial nations.

With the Peruvian Navy destroyed, Bolivia becoming a landlocked country, and Argentina having only a brown-water navy, the Chilean Navy had a regional hegemony in the years following the War of the Pacific. To secure this advantage and not let new Argentine acquisitions challenge Chilean naval power, the Chilean government decided to modernize its navy. The modernization plan included the ordering of two cruisers and two torpedo boat destroyers, and the modernization of two armoured ships in English docks.

=== Civil war and arms race (1885–1902) ===
Chilean Navy ship purchases and orders, 1887–1902
Year	Ships	Builder
1887	1 pre-dreadnought battleship 2 protected cruisers 2 torpedo boats	La Seyne; La Seyne ?
1891 Chilean Civil War
1892	1 protected cruiser	Elswick, Tyne and Wear
1895	1 protected cruiser 1 armored cruiser	Armstrong
1896	1 armoured cruiser 6 torpedo boats	Armstrong ?
1901	2 predreadnought battleships 1 protected cruiser	Armstrong; Armstrong
1902 arms control treaty with Argentina

A new predreadnought battleship, Capitán Prat, was ordered under the new construction program in 1889. The advent of the 1891 Chilean Civil War had a breach between the two branches of the Chilean armed forces, while the bulk of navy sided with the congress side, the majority of the Chilean Army remained loyal to José Manuel Balmaceda. When the majority of the national congress broke relations with the government, Jorge Montt took control of the fleet at Valparaíso and with notable politicians, such as Ramón Barros Luco, on board, the fleet sailed north to the nitrate-rich Tarapacá area, which Chile had seized from Peru 10 years earlier. Tarapacá was, by that time, Chile's richest region in terms of natural resources and was without the fleet practically out of reach for the Chilean Army. From here, the navy organized an army made of nitrate miners, whom they armed and trained to face the 40,000-men-strong Army of Chile. In August 1891, the new army was disembarked in Quintero and defeated the Chilean Army at the Battle of Concón and the Battle of Placilla before the presidential faction disbanded and the Congressional side took power. On the elections of October 1891, Jorge Montt was elected president.

Not all navy officers sided with the congress. Some like Juan Williams Rebolledo, Juan José Latorre and Policarpo Toro remained on the presidential side and Francisco Vidal Gormaz declared his neutrality. After the war these officers were removed from their offices. In contrast to these officers whose career or influence in the navy was truncated by the war, the 1891 Chilean Civil War served as a starting point of a successful career in the navy for a generation of young officers like Francisco Nef and others who sided with the Congressionals who won the war.

After incidents with Chile in 1872, 1877, and 1878, Argentina had decided that a brown-water navy, even if modern, was not enough to back up its ambitions in Patagonia and the South Atlantic. Both countries were distracted in the next few years by Argentina's internal military operations against natives and Chile's War of the Pacific against Bolivia and Peru, but by 1890, a full-fledged naval arms race was underway between the two. The Boundary treaty of 1881 between Chile and Argentina had been a major success in laying the groundwork for nearly all of Chile and Argentina's 5,600 kilometres (3,500 mi) of shared borders, but the drawing of boundaries in the largely unexplored inland Patagonia soon became a major source of territorial disputes. Over the 1880s and 1890s, Chile and Argentina engaged in an arms race fueled by nationalistic rhetoric and tax income from their blooming economies. Both countries signed a treaty in 1902 to end the arms race.

During the 1890s, the Chilean Navy carried out many hydrographic surveys in the Patagonian channels aimed to improve navigation, and explored the river basins of Patagonia. A German geographer, Hans Steffen, led navy explorations to western Patagonia, laying the groundwork for colonization of what would be Aisén Region years later. The navy occasionally collaborated with European naturalists such as Carl Skottsberg in their surveys of Chilean territory.

=== Depression and mutiny (1902–1950) ===
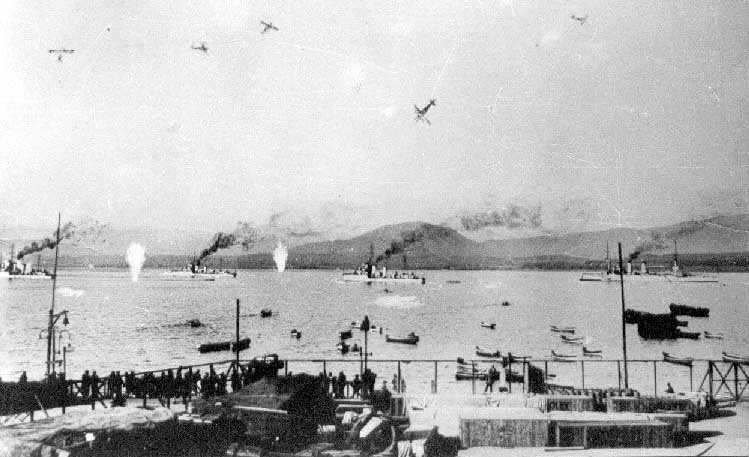
A possibly altered photograph shows the Chilean Air Force bombing the Chilean Fleet at the port of Coquimbo during the Chilean naval mutiny of 1931

In 1904, Brazil ordered two Minas Gerais-class dreadnoughts to be built by the United Kingdom. In response, Argentina ordered two Rivadavia-class dreadnoughts with an option for a third from the United States. They also ordered 12 destroyers from three nations in Europe. With its major rival acquiring so many modern vessels, (Note: By 1911, the disparity between the navies of Chile, Argentina, and Brazil had grown; Brazil had nearly four times the tonnage of Chile, while Argentina had nearly three-and-a-half times as much.) Chile was forced to respond, although this was delayed by a financial depression brought on by a major earthquake and a drastic fall in the nitrate market in 1906 and 1907, respectively. (Note: Livermore and Grant, who cites Livermore's work, both attribute part of this delay to a 1908 earthquake, but no major earthquake hit Chile in that year, cf. List of earthquakes in Chile. However, the Valparaíso earthquake of 1906 caused nearly 4,000 deaths, a tsunami, and a wide swath of destruction over the Chilean capital and surrounding areas. Given this, it seems likely that Livermore's 1908 earthquake was a typographical error inadvertently repeated in Grant's account.) Eventually, Chile ordered two Almirante Latorre-class super-dreadnoughts and six Almirante Lynch-class destroyers from British shipyards, but received only two destroyers before the rest were purchased by the Royal Navy during World War I; of these, Chile would finally receive three destroyers and one battleship, the Almirante Latorre, after the War.

Chile also received six British H-class submarines from the Royal Navy in 1917, and purchased three Capitan O'Brien-class submarines and six Serrano-class destroyers in the late 1920s. Its fleet of cruisers, though, all built in the 1890s, were totally outdated by the time the Great Depression forced their retirements without replacements.

In 1931, the navy once more made headlines in Chilean politics when large portions of it (26 ships) began a mutiny that demanded the president to rescind a salary reduction. The demands were later expanded to include an agrarian reform, industrial "solidarity", and the payment of the external debt by the "millionaires". The mutineers had their ships located at Coquimbo and Talcahuano's naval base, which they controlled. Chilean government responded by sending the Chilean Air Force to bombard the ships in Coquimbo and charging Talcahuano's naval base. After the quelling of the rebellion, the navy was purged, although the mutiny had its origin among the lower ranks.

These economic and political factors, along with Chile's neutrality for much of World War II, meant that the navy did not acquire any warships until after the war.

=== Role in Antarctica, incidents with Argentina, and the navy in the government (1950–1990) ===
Chile formulated its Antarctic claim in 1940. In 1947, the navy established the first Chilean base, the Captain Arturo Prat Base, on the continent before the Chilean Army or Air Force established their own bases. Since then, the navy has played a major role in supplying Chilean bases and performing numerous rescue missions, among them, the MV Explorer in 1972 and 2007.

The Navy's most recognizable sailing-school ship, the Esmeralda, began operations in 1952. It since has made various trips around the world with selected cadet officers and NCOs on board trained in ship handling and operations, as a requirement for graduation. Prior to the Esmeralda, another sailing ship, the General Baquedano, fulfilled the same functions.

In the 1950s, the Chilean Navy became involved in a series of incidents with the Argentine Navy and Argentine civilians in the disputed areas of the Beagle Channel and Cape Horn. These incidents took the form of incursions into Chilean waters by Argentine fishing ships, and provocations, such as the shelling of a Chilean lighthouse by the Argentine Navy during the Snipe incident of 1958.

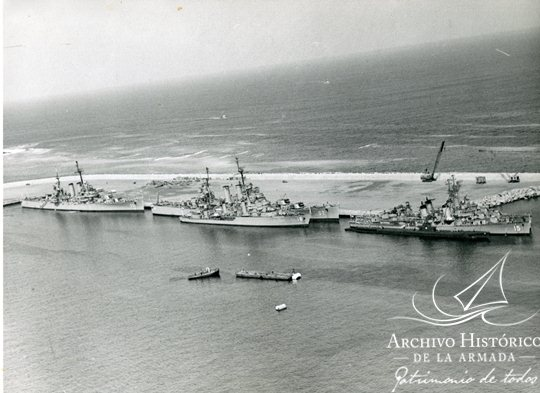
Destroyers Cochrane and Blanco Encalada, Fletcher class, light cruiser O’Higgins, destroyer Almirante Riveros and light cruiser Capitán Prat in Arica port, circa 1965.

During the late 1970s, the Chilean Navy played an important role in defending Chilean sovereignty over the Picton, Lennox and Nueva islands that the Argentine Navy planned to seize.

The birth of the modern Chilean Marine Corps of today began in 1964. Naval educational institutions were reformed in 1968, when president Eduardo Frei Montalva created the "Naval Specialities Schools System" with headquarters at the Las Salinas Naval Base in Viña del Mar. One of its schools, the Naval Seaman Training School, became the Seamen's School of the Navy "Captain Alejandro Navarrete Cisterna" in the same year as its centenary, in honor of the first naval seaman to rise through the ranks to become a naval officer. The NSSS soon became the Naval Polytechnic Academy in 1995, through a merger of all its component schools, with some of these schools staying as independent constituent academies.

After the 1973 Chilean coup d'etat, together with the Army, the Air Force, and the Carabiniers, the navy, led by Admiral Jose Toribio Merino, became part of the government junta led by army commander in chief Augusto Pinochet. Upon the latter's resignation from the junta leadership in 1981, Adm. Merino became its chairman until March 1990, presiding over its sessions and those of the Legislative Commission. He was also, concurrently, the national defense minister. The training ship Esmeralda functioned as a floating prison and torture chamber for political prisoners during the 1973–1980 period of the military dictatorship. It is claimed that probably over a hundred persons were kept there at times and subjected to hideous treatment. It was also an unprecedented period of growth and expansion of the naval service, as more vessels became part of it, the marines strengthened and the navy's special forces unit raised.

The Chilean Navy Archive and Historical Library was founded in 1997 to preserve, manage, and provide access to Chile’s naval historical documents and maritime heritage. Its headquarters are located in Valparaíso, housed within the historic Almirante Luis Uribe Orrego Building, which is part of the Naval Operations Command.

== Present ==
The 25,000-person navy, including 5,200 marines, is directed by Admiral Julio Leiva Molina Martin as of 2017. Of the fleet of 66 surface vessels (soon to be increased to 74), 21 are major combatant ships based in Valparaíso. The navy operates its own aircraft for transport, patrol, and surface and antisubmarine attack. The navy also operates four submarines and a tender ship to support them, all based in Talcahuano.

The navy also provides access to services for residents of Chile's Pacific and Southern island regions, thus integrating its disjointed geography. The transport of passengers, especially during the school year or in cases of emergency, together with the supply of provisions and fuel, are of key importance to the inhabitants of these insular zones.

The institution regularly carries out civil operations whereby navy professionals provide social assistance and health care to the civilian population, and provide support in cases of natural catastrophe.

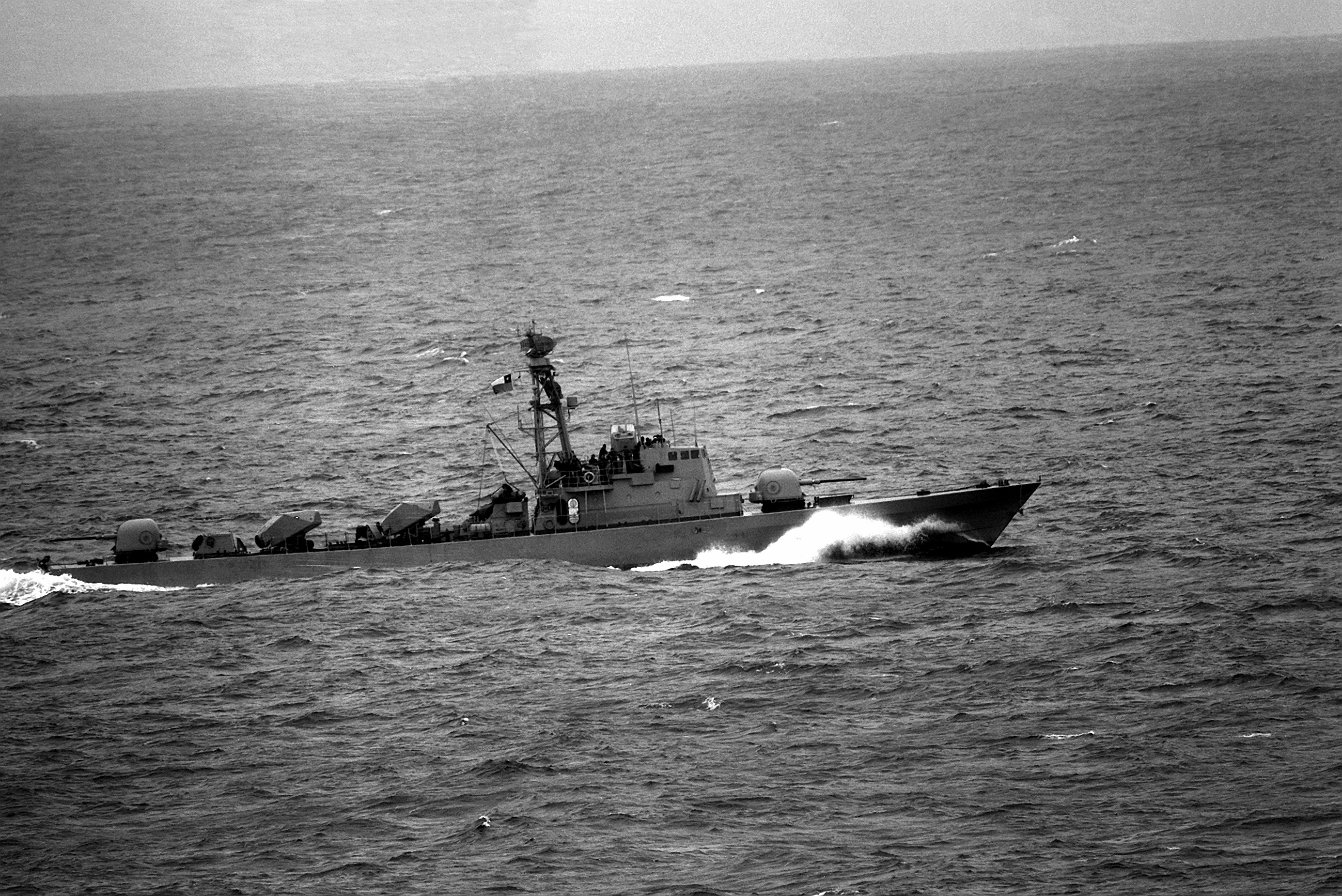
Sa'ar 4 type ship of the Chilean Navy

It also undertakes preventive education campaigns for Chile's population on issues that include security on beaches and seaside resorts, and measures to be taken in the case of a tsunami.

The most important naval bases and supply depots are (from north to south) in the Pacific Ocean: Iquique, Easter Island, Valparaíso, Talcahuano, Puerto Montt; in the Atlantic zone: Strait of Magellan and Tierra del Fuego: Punta Arenas, in the Beagle Channel, Cape Horn and Drake Passage: Puerto Williams, and in Antarctica: Captain Arturo Prat Base. These are now spread into five naval zones.

== Equipment ==
=== Historic ships ===
- See List of decommissioned ships of the Chilean Navy
- Baquedano, first school ship of the navy
- Almirante Latorre, only dreadnought battleship of the Chilean Navy
- Blanco Encalada
- Covadonga
- Flach, a submarine prototype of 1866
- Ironclad Huáscar, museum ship in Talcahuano
- Lautaro, as Priwall recorded the fastest ever westward rounding of Cape Horn by a commercial sailing ship in five days and fourteen hours
- Steam corvette Esmeralda (1855)
- 2nd class protected cruiser Esmeralda (1883)
- Esmeralda (BE-43), school ship of the navy

== Future Navy acquisitions ==
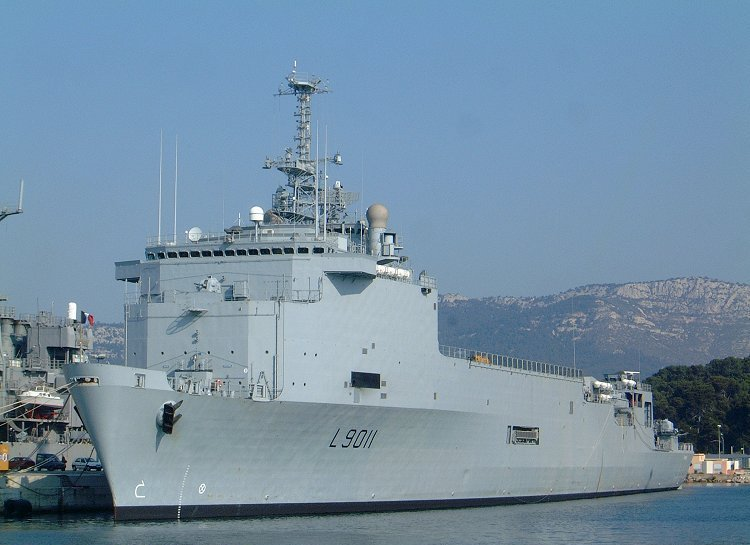
Amphibious landing ship Foudre

- Helicopters and armored amphibians for LSDH Aldea.
- The construction of another 3 PZM Patrulleros de Zona Marítima PZM, one for each naval zone.
- Elbit Hermes 900 unmanned aerial vehicle for maritime patrol tasks - under evaluation.
- Replacement or modernization of the L-class frigates. On December 27, 2019, it was announced that Australia had sold the Adelaide-class frigates, HMAS Newcastle (FFG 06) and HMAS Melbourne (FFG 05) to Chile.
- Construction of 4 multi-purpose ships (LPD), part of project "Escotillón IV" and the "plan de construcción naval continua" (continuous naval construction plan in spanish) of the Chilean Navy.

== Chilean Marines ==
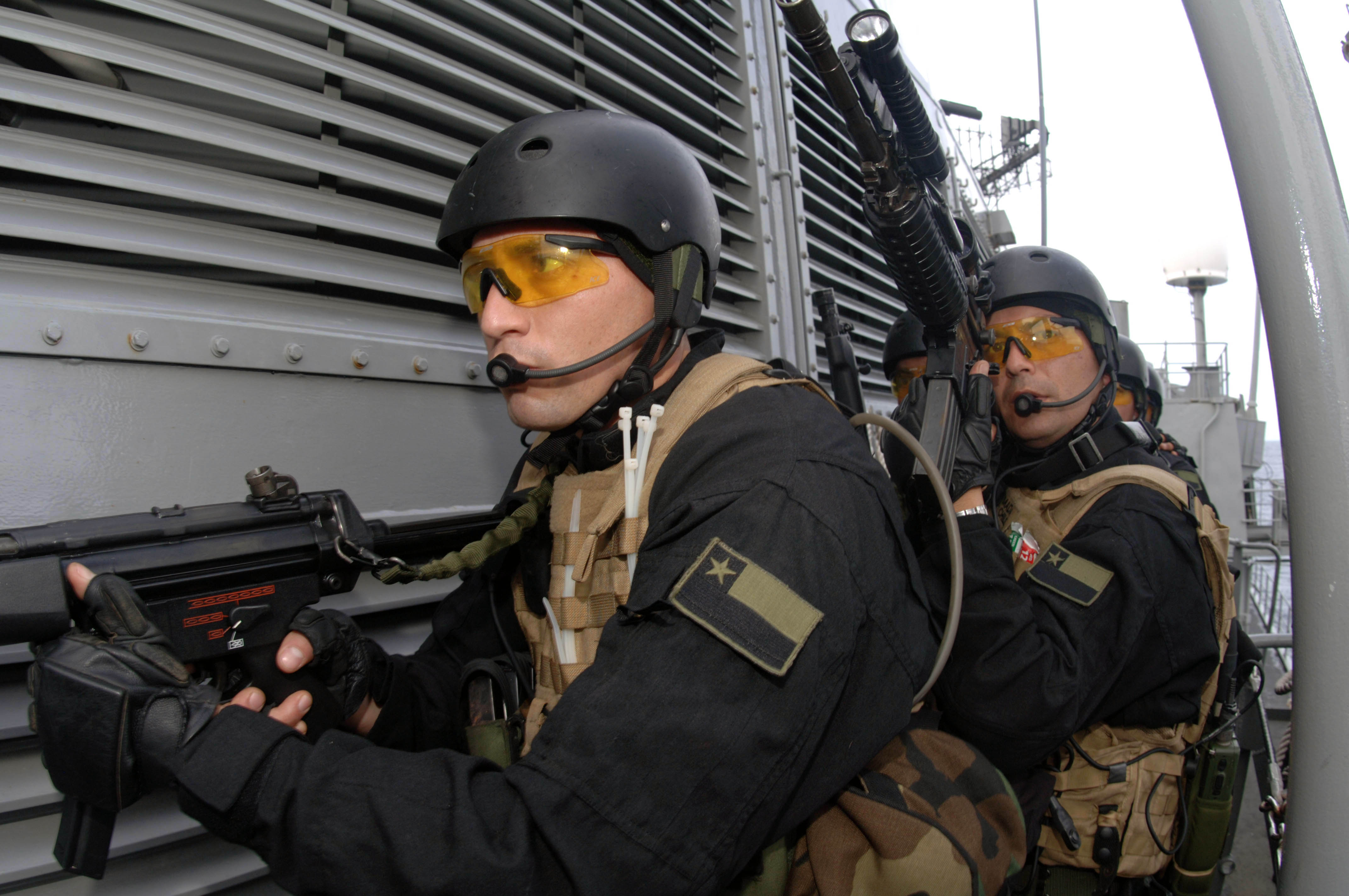
Chilean Navy special forces sailors equipped with the MP5N

The Chilean Marines or (Infanteria de Marina de Chile) are the land/amphibious attack force of the Chilean Navy. The 5,000 man force combines special training and tactics with state-of-the-art equipment.

== SHOA ==
The Servicio Hidrográfico y Oceanográfico de la Armada de Chile (SHOA, Spanish for Hydrological and Oceanographic Service of the Chilean Navy) is an agency of the Chilean Navy managing situations dealing with hydrology and oceanography including tides and tsunamis. SHOA is also the official Chilean government timekeeper.

== Ranks and rates ==
Ranks and rates are shown on the sleeves of all Chilean Navy summer uniforms (and on the shoulder boards on winter or summer service uniforms as well for officers and WOs only). Shoulder and sleeve ranks are inspired by those in the British Royal Navy, the French Navy and the German Navy. Officers, WOs and NCOs of the Marines add the Infante de Marina (Marine Soldier) title to their ranks from Seaman onward, as the Marines are part of the Navy.

All officers, active or reserve, study at the Arturo Prat Naval Academy and later in the Naval Polytechnic Academy and the Naval War Academy receive improved training and education to be promoted as well as training in his/her specialty field while all active and reserve NCOs (known in the Navy through the general term Men of the Sea) study at the Seamen's School of the Navy "Alejandro Navarette Cisnerna" and later in the Naval Polytechnic Academy and its attached and independent colleges for later specialty training.

=== Officers ===
Rank group	General/flag officers				Senior officers			Junior officers
Chilean Navy
Chilean Navy	Almirante	Vicealmirante	Contraalmirante	Comodoro	Capitán de navío	Capitán de fragata	Capitán de corbeta	Teniente 1°	Teniente 2°	Subteniente	Guardiamarina

=== Enlisted ===
Rank group	Senior NCOs				Junior NCOs		Enlisted
Chilean Navy
Chilean Navy	Suboficial mayor	Suboficial	Sargento primero	Sargento segundo	Cabo primero	Cabo segundo	Marinero primero	Marinero segundo

== Gallery ==
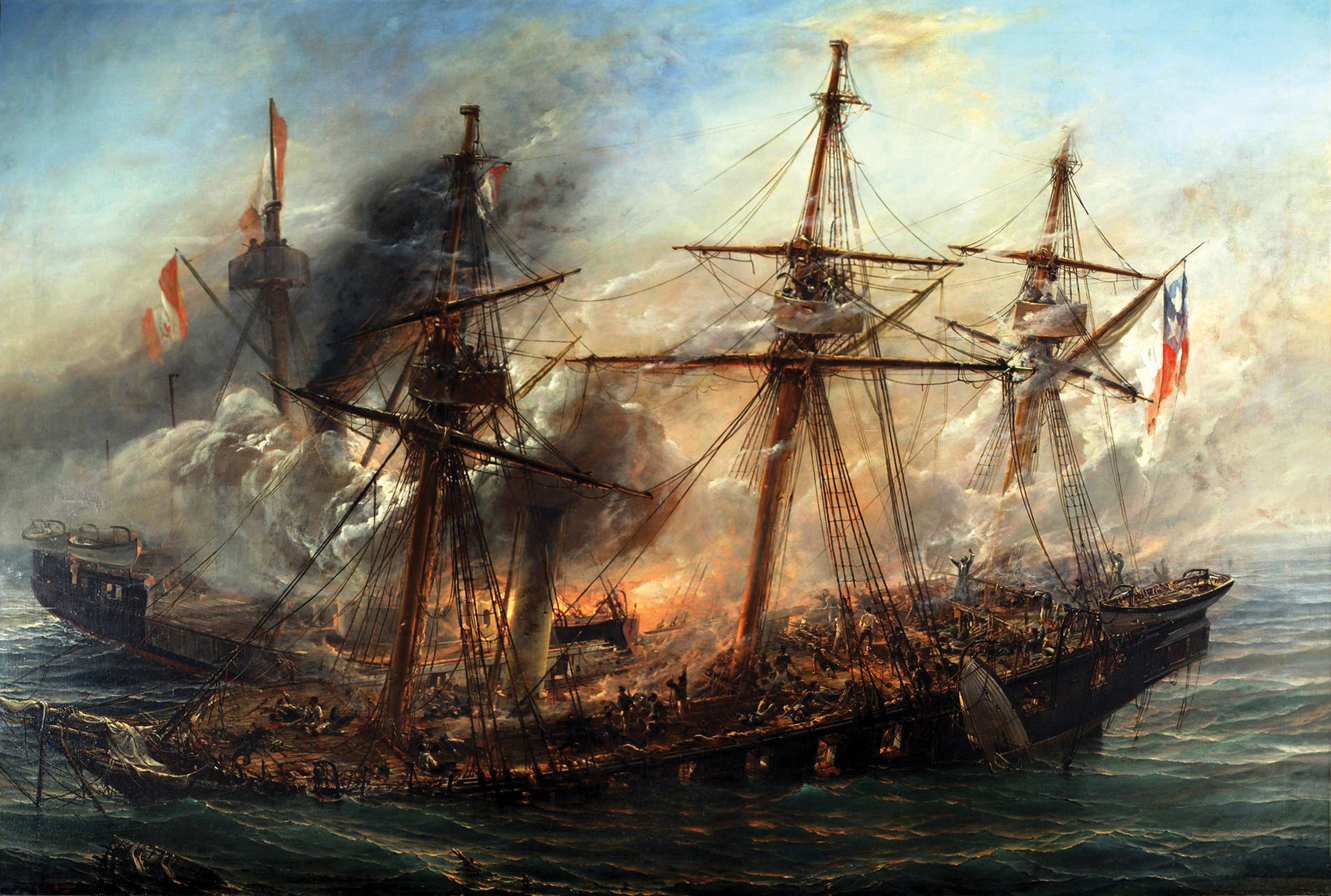
Naval Battle of Iquique. Esmeralda versus Huascar

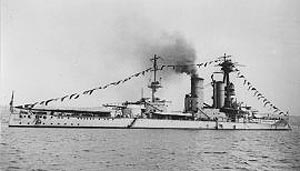
Battleship Almirante Latorre

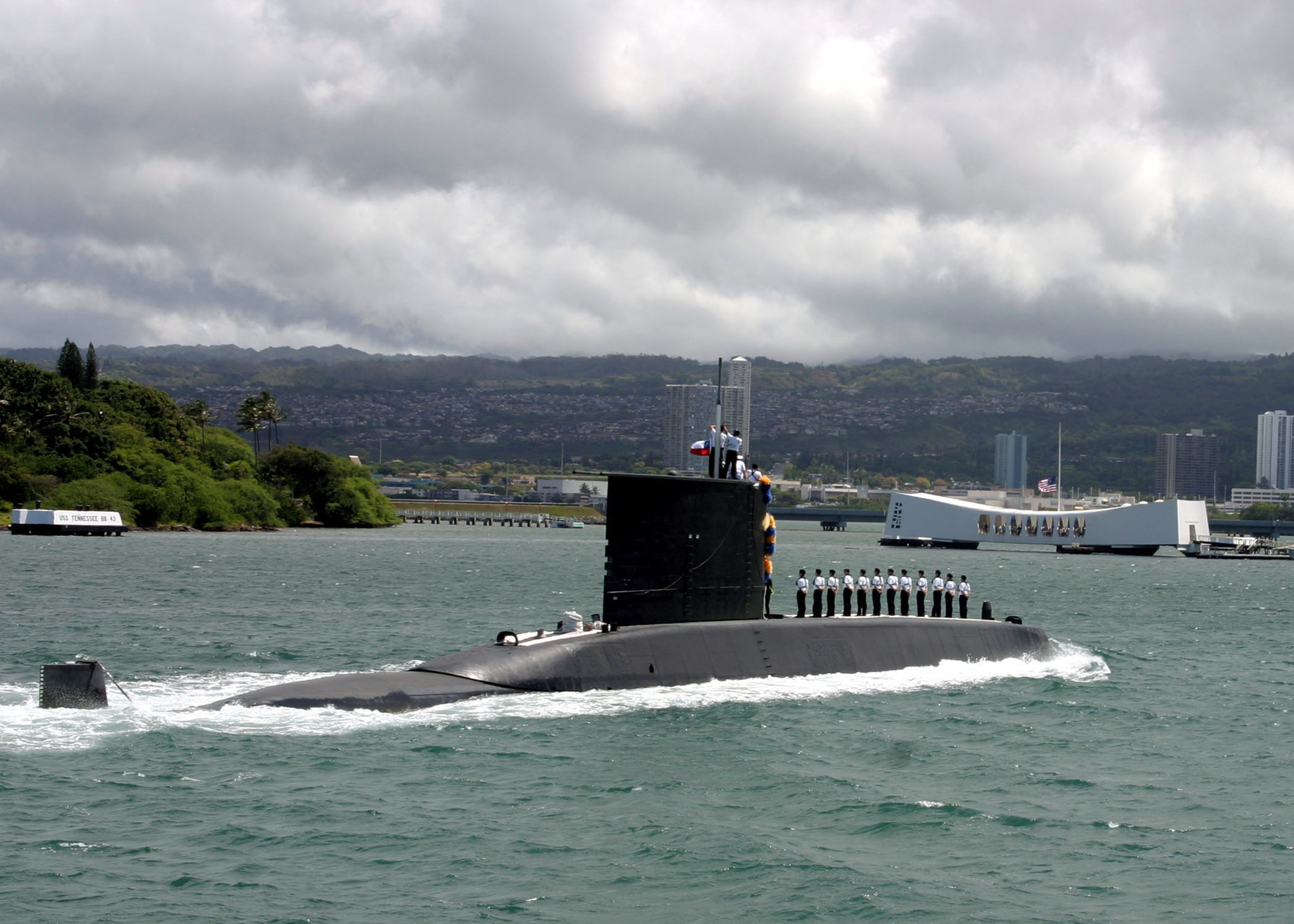
The submarine Simpson (SS-21) entering Pearl Harbor, Hawaii in 2004

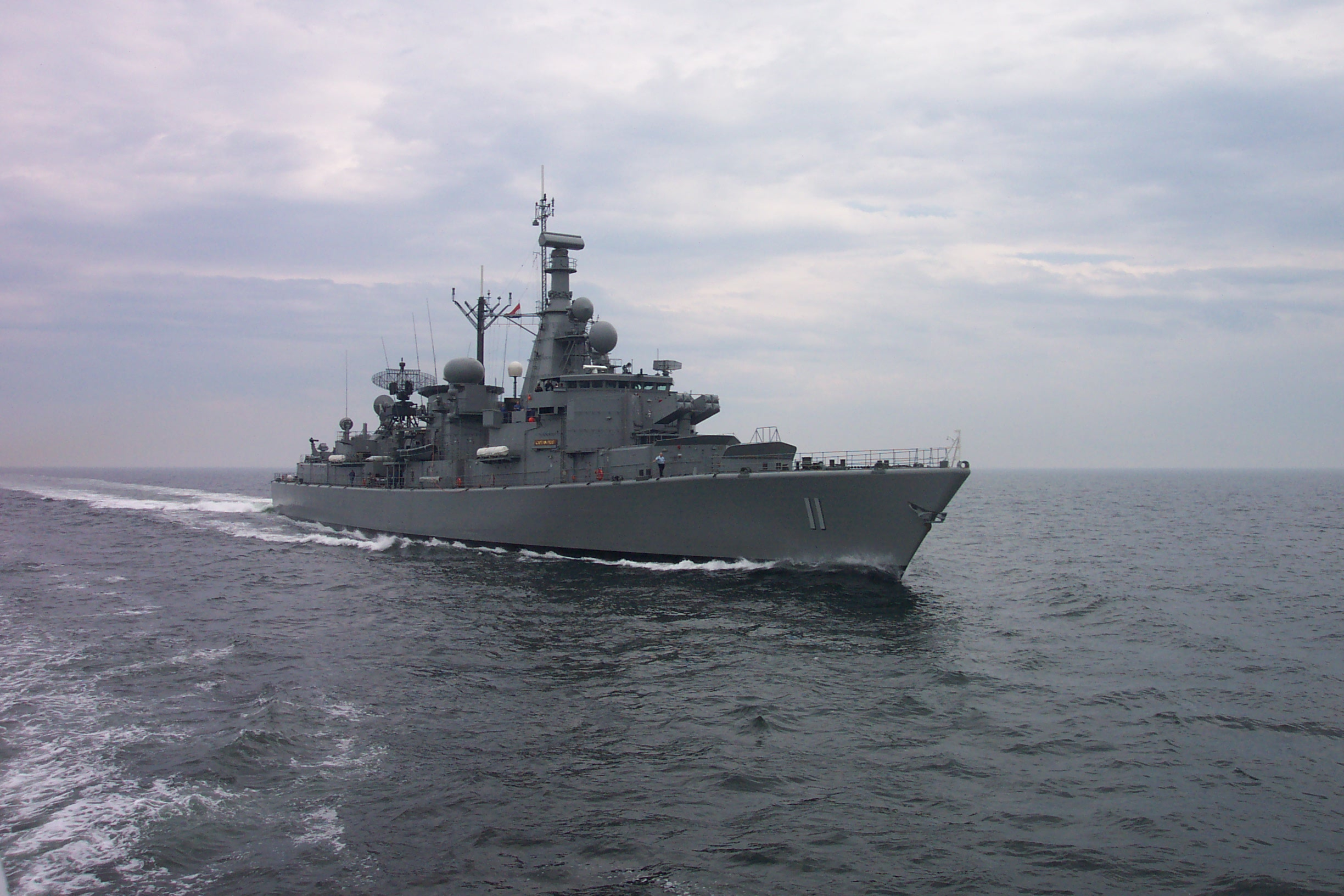
Capitan Prat on the North Sea

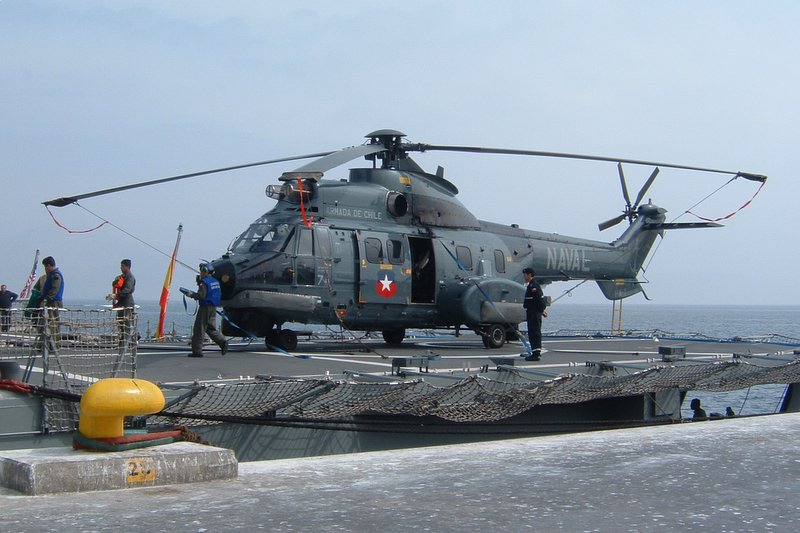
Chilean Navy Cougar

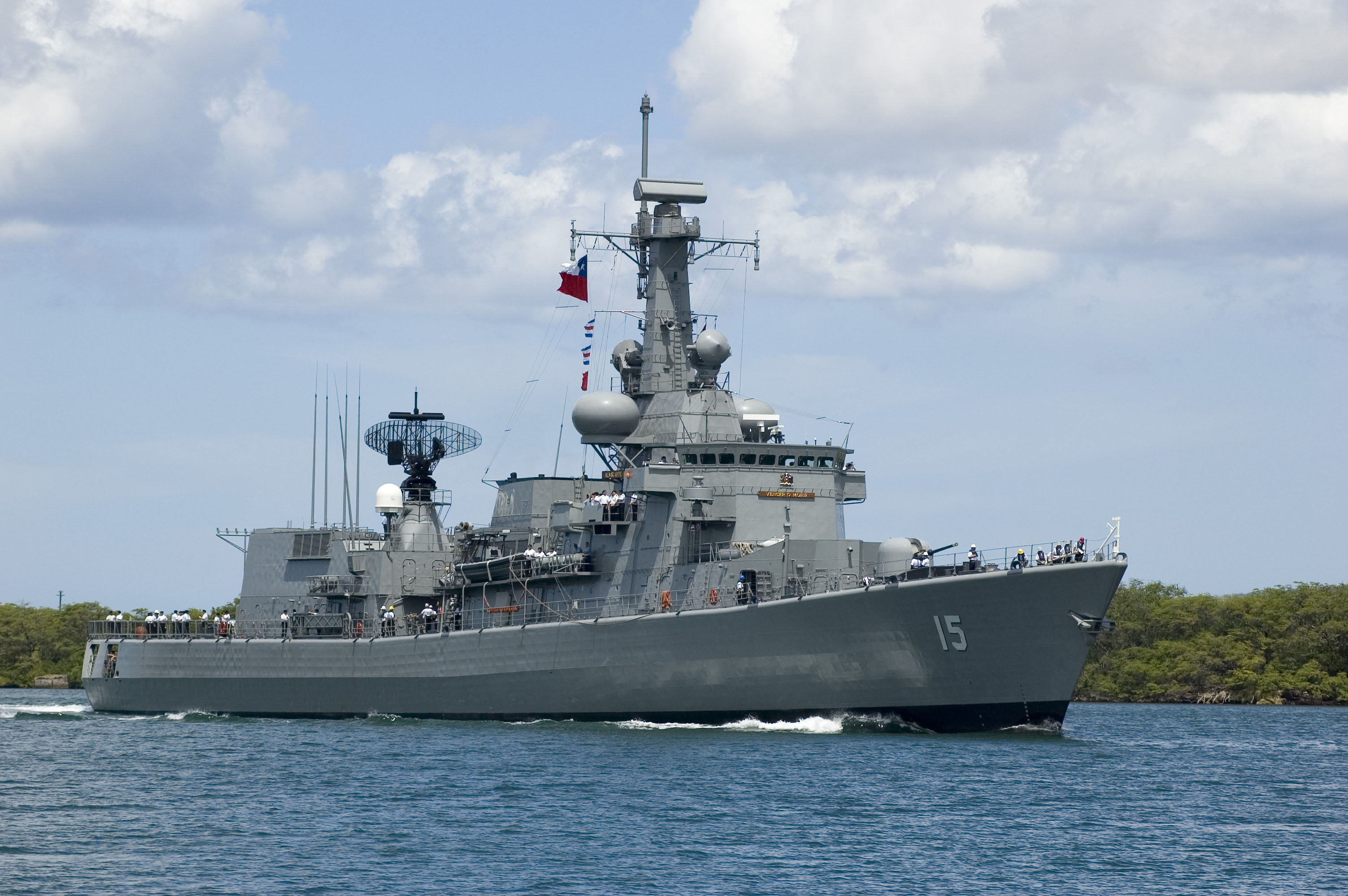
Chilean frigate Almirante Blanco Encalada at Pearl Harbor, 2006

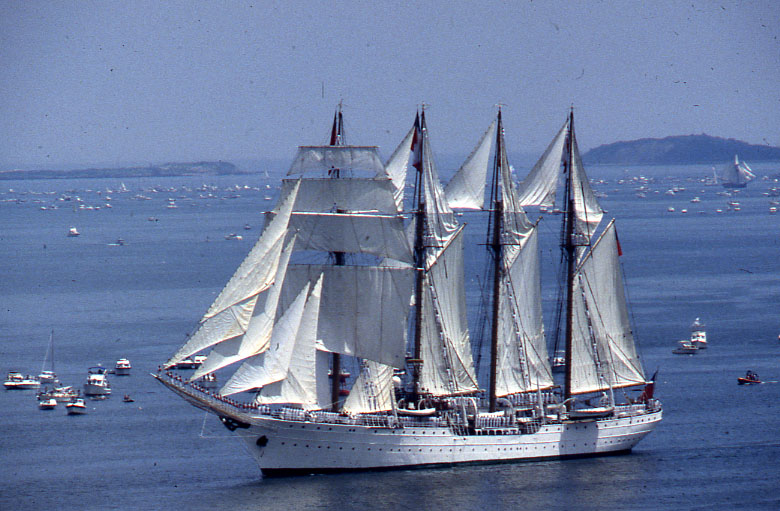
Chilean training ship Esmeralda in Boston

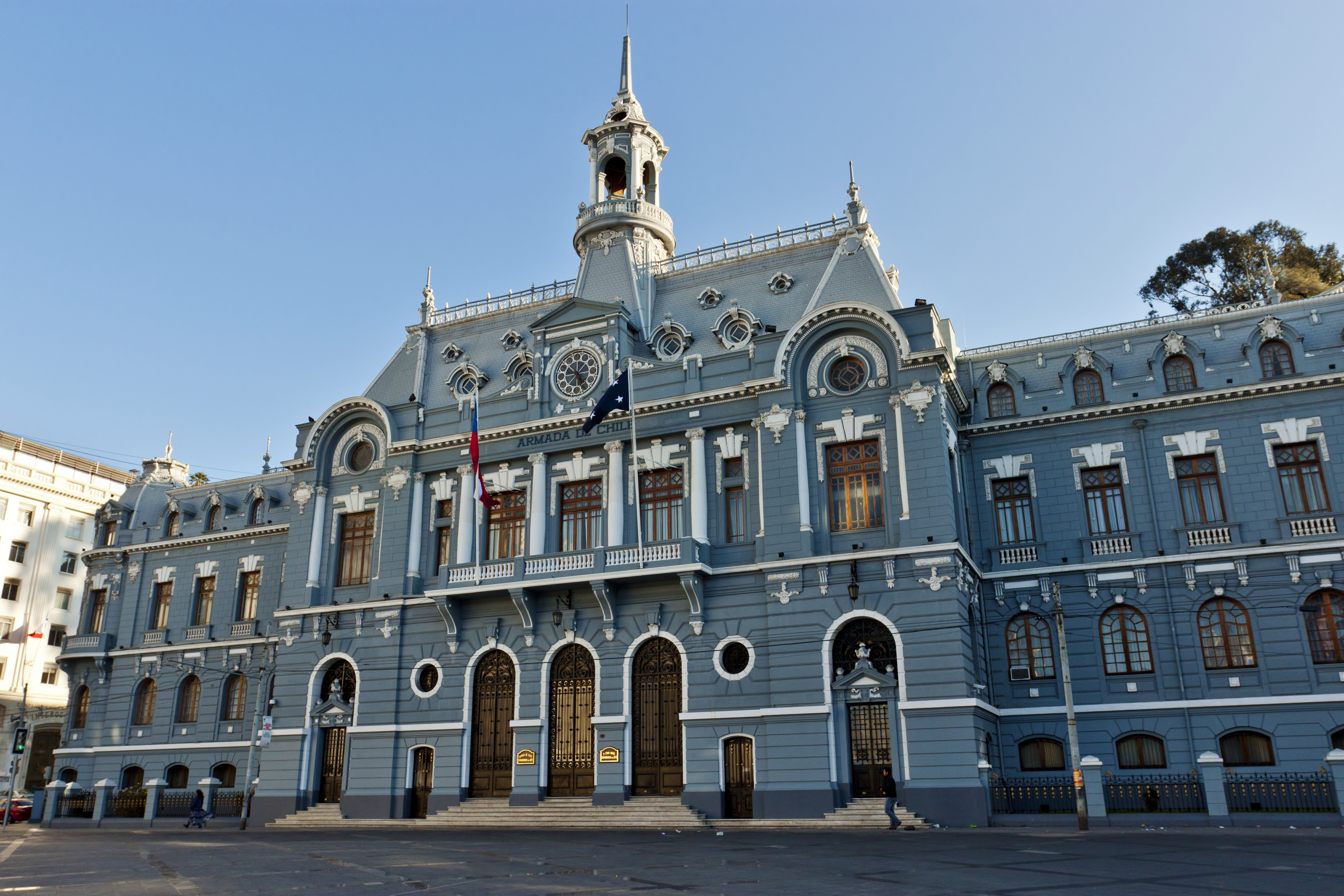
Headquarters of Chilean Navy, in Valparaíso
