= Kirchbach =

Kirchbach may refer to:

== Places ==
- Kirchbach (Gräbenackers Bach), a river of Hesse, Germany, tributary of the Gräbenackers Bach
- Kirchbach, Carinthia, a market town in the Austrian state of Carinthia
- Kirchbach in Steiermark, a former municipality in the Austrian state of Styria
- Kirchbach-Zerlach, a municipality in the Austrian state of Styria

== Surname ==
- Esther von Kirchbach (1894–1946), German journalist, poet and chaplain of the Confessing Church
- Frank Kirchbach (1859-1912), German painter, graphic designer and illustrator
- Gunar Kirchbach (born 1971), German sprint canoer
- Günther von Kirchbach (1850–1925), German Generaloberst who served during the First World War
- Hans von Kirchbach (1849–1928), Royal Saxon army officer who was Generaloberst in the First World War
- Hugo von Kirchbach (1809–1887), Prussian general in the Franco-Prussian War
- Wolfgang Kirchbach (1857–1906), German critic and writer
