= Fritz Boehle =

German sculptor and painter (1873–1916)

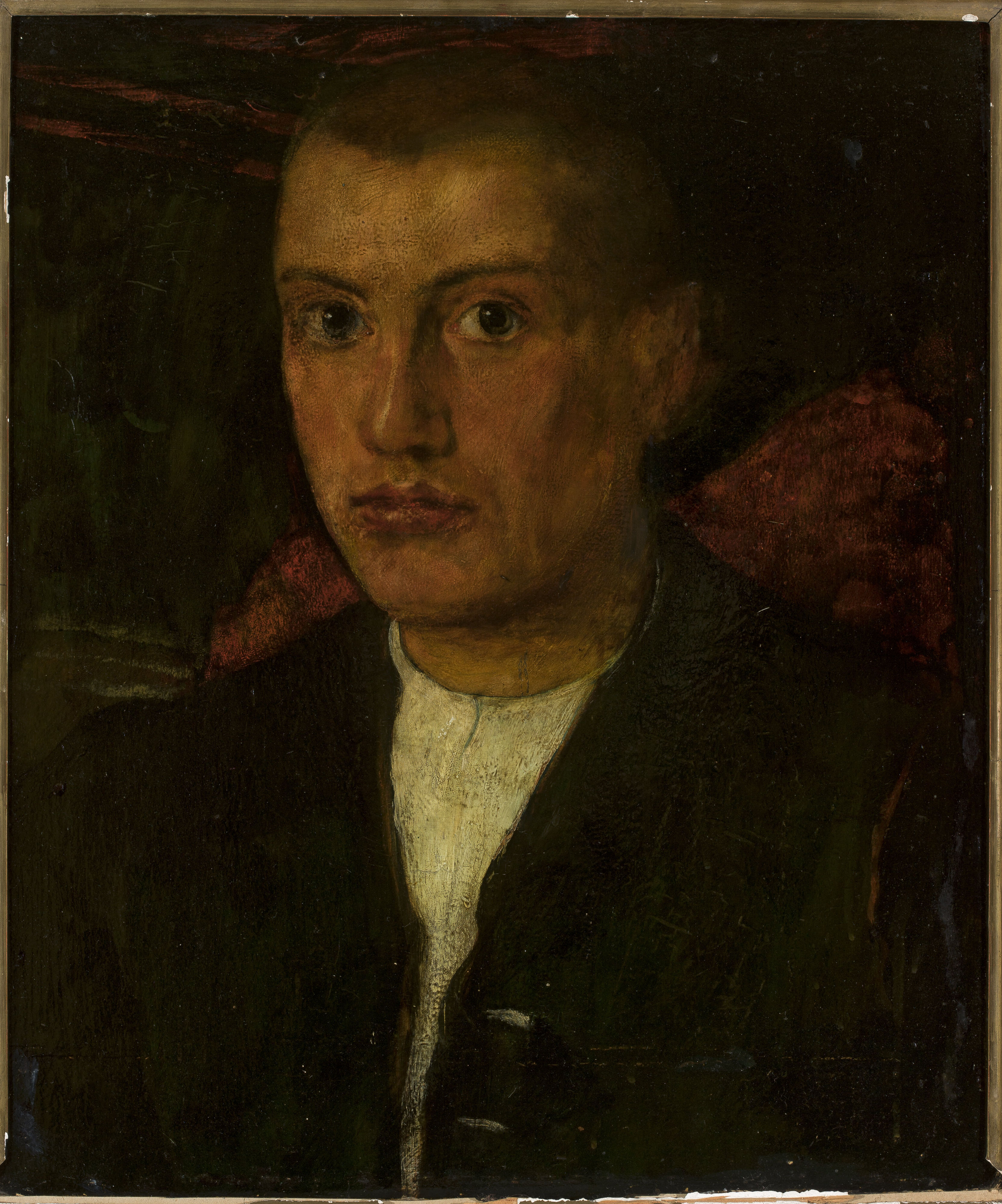
- Fritz Boehle Self Portrait
- Born: Karl Friedrich Boehle; February 7, 1873; Emmendingen, Germany
- Died: 20 October 1916 (aged 43); Frankfurt am Main, Germany
- Education: Städelsches Kunstinstitut
- Movement: Völkisch movement
- Awards: Große Berliner Kunstausstellung; 1907 Gold Medal
- Patrons: Conrad Binding

Karl Friedrich "Fritz" Boehle (February 7, 1873 – October 20, 1916) was a German visual artist associated with the Völkisch movement. He is best known for his realistic and romantic depictions of rural German life and figures of Christian tradition.

== Early life and education ==
Boehle was born on February 7, 1873, in Emmendingen, a town in the Black Forest region of Germany. He was the eldest of four brothers. His mother ran a small haberdashery in their hometown.

Boehle began his artistic education at the Städel Institute in Frankfurt, where he studied drawing under Heinrich Hasselhorst and painting under Johann Frank Kirchbach. At age 22, Boehle went to Munich to study under Wilhelm von Diez.

From an early age, Boehle displayed a fondness for the past. He greatly admired the works of old masters like Matthäus Merian the Elder, Wenceslaus Hollar, Isaac van Ostade, and Antonie Waterloo, and their influence is evident in his own art.

== Career ==
In 1897, Boehle permanently settled in Sachsenhausen (Frankfurt am Main). Boehle's career began to take off in the early 1900s when his work started gaining recognition in Germany. His detailed and realistic portrayals of rural life resonated with the German public, particularly in the context of a rising nationalist sentiment. Boehle's works were frequently exhibited in prominent German galleries and museums, further solidifying his reputation as a leading artist of the Völkisch movement.

Boehle's art was characterized by its commitment to tradition and heritage, often drawing inspiration from the German countryside and its people. His rural scenes, depicting daily life, farming, and religious traditions, became iconic images of Germanic heritage. Boehle's deep respect for craftsmanship and his attention to detail are evident in his work, particularly in his religious figures, such as St. George and St. Martin.

Boehle also drew a significant amount of inspiration from literature. His admiration for the works of Cervantes is particularly noteworthy, with references to these literary pieces often found within his works.

== Later life and legacy ==
Boehle's life was cut short by his untimely death on October 20, 1916, due to complications from diabetes. However, his influence on German art persisted. His work became synonymous with the Völkisch movement, embodying its principles of romantic nationalism, rural life, and a return to traditional values.

His works continue to be exhibited in galleries and museums around the world.

The Fritz Boehle School and Fritz-Boehle-Straße in Emmendingen, his hometown, was named in his honor.

== Personal life ==
Boehle was known for his deep love for the German countryside, which he frequently explored on long walks. He was also an avid reader, often drawing inspiration from literature for his artwork. Boehle never married and was known to have a somewhat solitary lifestyle, focusing much of his energy on his art.

Boehle was a deeply patriotic individual, with a profound love for his country and its heritage. This sentiment was reflected in his artwork, which often depicted scenes of rural Germany and its traditions.

== Selected works ==
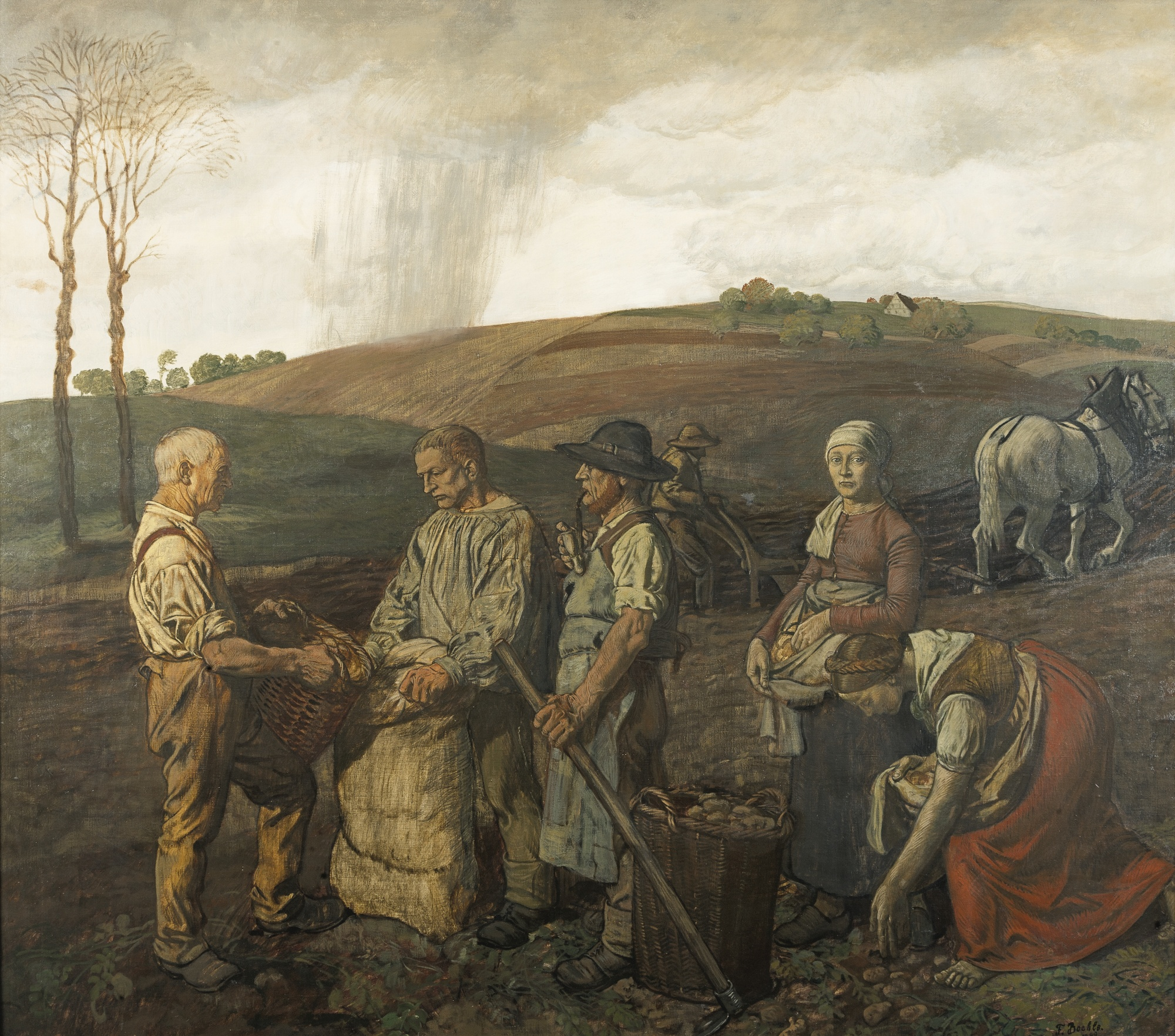
Kartoffelernte (1899)

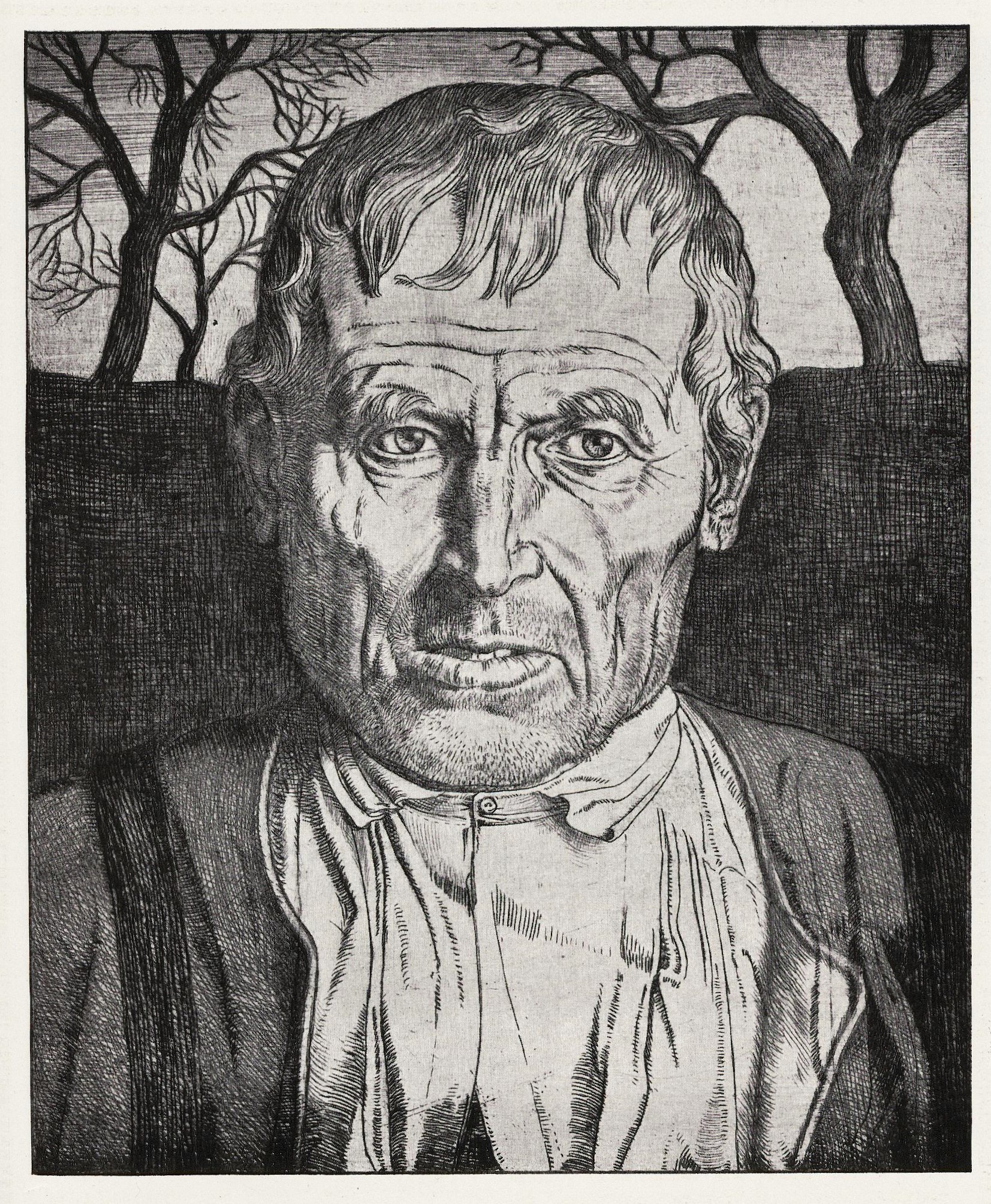
Brustbild eines Bauern (1906)

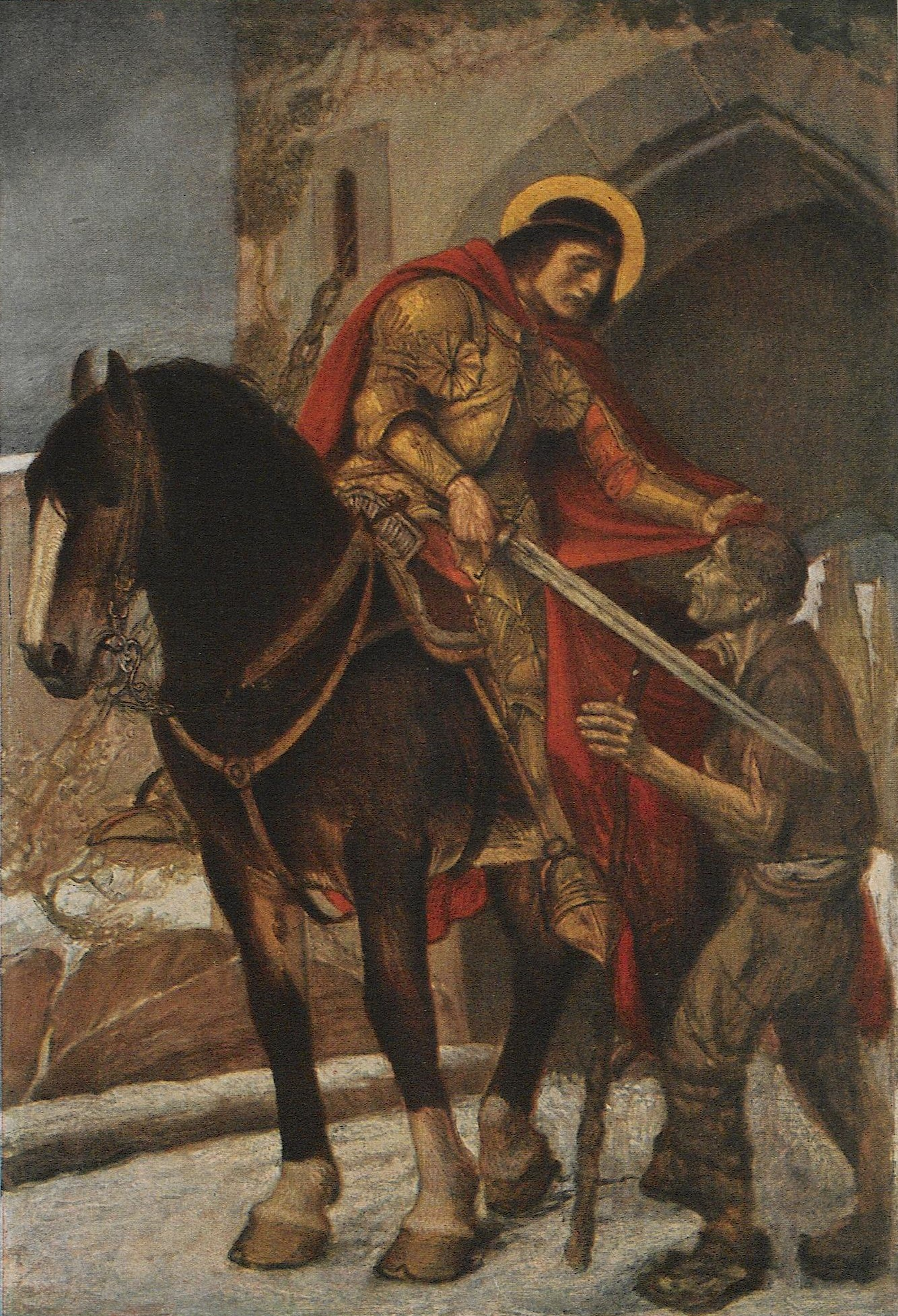
Der heilige Martin
