= Lauf =

Lauf may refer to:

- Lauf an der Pegnitz, town in Bavaria, Germany
- Lauf (Baden), municipality in Baden-Württemberg, Germany
- Lauf Cycling, an Icelandic cyclocross company

== See also ==
- Hans Freiherr von Geyer zu Lauf (1895–1959), German painter
- The Way Things Go (German: Der Lauf der Dinge), a 1987 art film by the Swiss artist duo Peter Fischli and David Weiss
- Lauff
