= German Diary Archive =

Archive in Emmendingen, Germany

Coordinates: 48°07′13″N 7°50′59″E

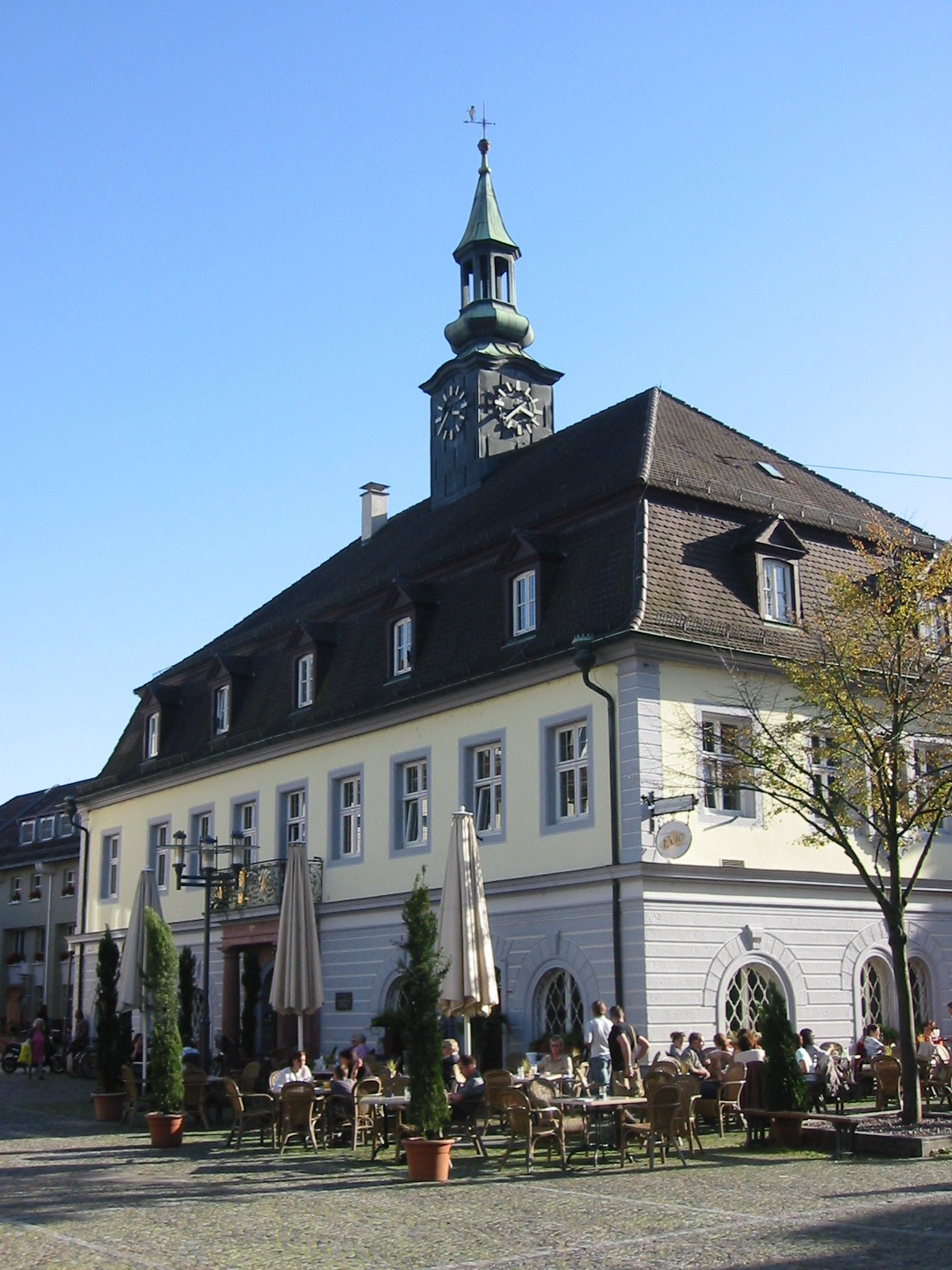
The German Diary Archive in the Old Town Hall of Emmendingen.

The German Diary Archive (abbreviated to DTA in German) in Emmendingen opened in 1998. It collects private diaries, memoirs, and correspondence; its current collections range from the late 18th century to the present. The archival collections are available for researchers and students, with some restrictions for privacy. As of August 2024, the archive's holdings include more than 27,000 personal documents of nearly 6,000 different authors.

== Establishment and organization ==
The diary archive began in January 1998. It is funded by contributions from its members, grants, donations, and, as of 2023, funding from the state of Baden-Württemberg. In addition to a full-time office manager and a research associate, more than 80 volunteers contribute to the archiving, digitization, and content-based indexing of the collected life testimonies.

== Aims ==
The goal of the archive is to preserve everyday history, hence their focus on unpublished life stories from the individuals in their archives.

The archive is the first of its kind in Germany, though others like it existed before it was founded in other countries and focused on other languages.

In March 2019, the archive was recognized by the state of Baden-Württemberg as a "cultural monument of special importance".

=== Collections scope ===
The archive is interested in diaries, memoirs, letters, and photos or other personal documents of private individuals. They explicitly state they do not want documents such as calendars, guestbooks, legal documents, accounting books, or published or fictional texts.

=== Usage and research ===
The German diary archive can be used by appointment during its business hours. But its website offers an online catalog for individual researchers and preliminary searches.

== Similar organizations ==
=== In Germany ===
- Berlin's Diary and Memory Archive, founded in 2005, at the Treptow Local History Museum.
- The collections of writer Walter Kempowski in House Kreienhoop ("Archive for unpublished autobiographies").

=== In other countries ===
Many similar archives are members of the European Diary Archives and Collections organization.

- France: "Association pour l‘autobiographie et le patrimoine autobiographique (L‘APA France)," founded in 1991
- Italy: "Archivo Diaristico Nazionale," founded in 1984 as "Città del diario"
- Portugal: "Arquivo dos Diários," founded in 2013
- Netherlands: "Nederlands Dagboekarchief," founded in 2009
