= Ephraim Kuh =

German-Jewish poet

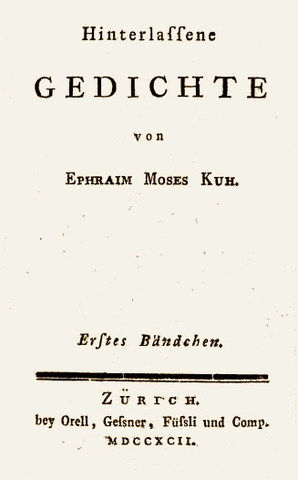
Ephraim Kuh: Title page of Hinterlassene Gedichte, Zürich, 1792

Ephraim Moses Kuh (1731 – 3 April 1790) was a German-Jewish poet.

He was born in Breslau (today Wrocław) to a Jewish merchant family. His father wished him to become a rabbi but in the face of his son's opposition he allowed him to live in Berlin at the house of a relative, the banker and jeweller Veitel Heine Ephraim, who was chairman of the Berlin Jewish congregation. In Berlin Kuh met with Moses Mendelssohn, Lessing and other intellectuals. Proving incompetent as an assistant to his uncle, and addicted to books, he travelled for two years through France and Italy (1768–1770), always accompanied by his library in three large chests. Returning to live in Breslau, he suffered a prolonged nervous breakdown; in 1786 he was paralyzed by a stroke on his right side, from which he never fully recovered.

Kuh, who wrote more than 5000 poems, is believed to be the first Jewish poet to write in the German language. Kuh was particularly noted for his mastery of the epigram in the tradition of Martial. A selection of the poems was published in Zürich after his death in 1792. They contain praise of Frederick the Great of Prussia, but also highlight the problems and indignities experienced by Jews in Germany.

A novel based on Kuh's life, Dichter und Kaufmann (Poet and Merchant), was written in 1839 by Berthold Auerbach.
