= Auf der Höhe =

1865 novel by Berthold Auerbach

Auf der Höhe (English: On the Heights) is a novel by German author Berthold Auerbach published in 1865. It reflects a period of constitutional political conflict in Germany, and is the most widely known of Auerbach's novels. English translations by S. A. Stern and others are available.

== Plot ==
The central figure is a king whose self-confident individuality comes in conflict with his love of popular freedom. Anticipating the superman of later writers, he feels that his nature is cast in too large a mold to be confined by constitutional restraints or ethical conventions. In conflict with a majority of the elected representatives of the people over some ecclesiastical question, he dissolves the assembly in his impatience of any outer control.

The same characteristics are manifesting themselves meantime in his domestic life. His queen is a gentle lady of domestic instincts. He loves her, yet he finds in the forceful, energetic Countess Irma, one of her ladies in waiting, a spirit so answering to his own that they join to transgress, he the bond of marriage, she of loyalty to her queen. Atonement comes first to Irma, who withdraws from the court into solitude, recognizing that one who would live a life of nature may not claim the protection of the social order.

Thus the king is brought to realize that life for its full unfolding depends not only on following the law of nature or the law of custom, but in the co-ordination of them, when man of his own free will yields obedience to law. He dismisses his autocratic counsellors and bows to the will of his people. The stress of this psychic drama is relieved by scenes between the queen and Wallpurga, the little prince's peasant nurse, who passes, as does her husband, through a conflict parallel to that of Irma and the king, though both are saved from straying by their unsophisticated respect for the folkways. The contrast between court and peasant life is a primary interest in On the Heights.
