= Berthold Auerbach =

German poet and author (1812–1882)

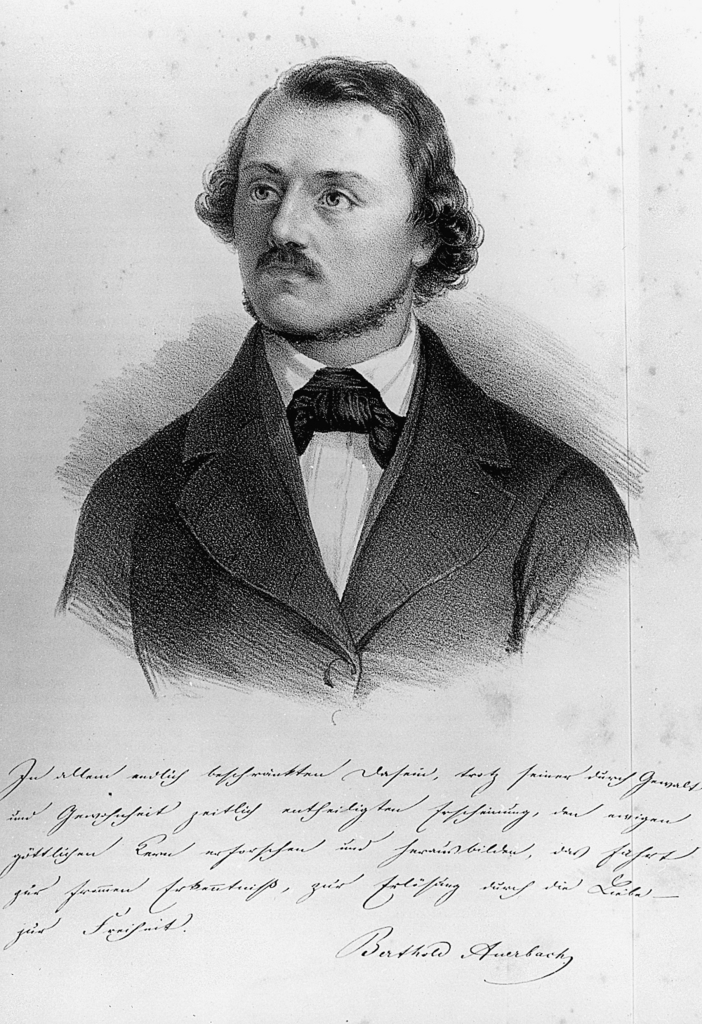
Lithograph of Auerbach with a sample of his handwriting, c.1850

Berthold Auerbach (28 February 1812 – 8 February 1882) was a German poet and author. He was the founder of the German "tendency novel", in which fiction is used as a means of influencing public opinion on social, political, moral, and religious questions.

== Biography ==
Moses (Moyses) Baruch Auerbach was born in Nordstetten (now Horb am Neckar) in the Kingdom of Württemberg. He attended Eberhard-Ludwigs-Gymnasium. He grew up in an impoverished Jewish family and initially pursued rabbinical studies. He was intended for the ministry, but after studying philosophy at the University of Tübingen, the Ludwig-Maximilians-Universität München, and Heidelberg University, and becoming estranged from Jewish orthodoxy by the study of Spinoza, he devoted himself to literature. While a student in Heidelberg and under the pseudonym “Theobald Chauber,” he produced a Biography of Frederick the Great (1834–36).

Another early publication was entitled Das Judentum und die neueste Litteratur (Judaism and Recent Literature; 1836), and was to be followed by a series of novels taken from Jewish history. Of this intended series he actually published, with considerable success, Spinoza (1837) and Dichter und Kaufmann ("Poet and Merchant"; 1839), based on the life of Ephraim Kuh. His romance on the life of Spinoza adheres so closely to fact that it may be read with equal advantage as a novel or as a biography. In 1841, he created a translation of Spinoza's works. In 1842, he wrote Der gebildete Bürger ("The Educated Citizen"), an attempt to popularize philosophical subjects.

But real fame and popularity came to him after 1843, when he began to occupy himself with the life of the common people which forms the subject of his best-known works. That year he published Schwarzwälder Dorfgeschichten ("Black Forest Village Stories"; 1843) which was his first great success, widely translated, and expressing with a sympathetic realism the memories and scenes of youth.

In 1857, he paid tribute to the beloved German author and professor of philosophy Christian F. Gellert in his story Gellerts letzte Weihnachten ("Christian Gellert's Last Christmas"), published in Deutscher Familienkalendar ("The German Family Almanac"). An English translation was first published in 1869 and later included in The 10 volume anthology Stories by Foreign Authors (German Volume 2) first published by Charles Scribner's Sons in 1898; it is the first story in the volume, which includes a frontispiece portrait of Auerbach. The story illustrates the far-reaching impact of the beloved professor's writings on his fellow citizens. It opens with Gellert and the rustic woodcutter Christopher reflecting on how their work takes a toll on their painfully aging bodies, pondering what alternative career might have been more fulfilling. Christopher's attitude is transformed when he reads Gellert's verse in his children's school book, which is lying open on his breakfast table.

Accept God's gifts with resignation,
Content to lack what thou hast not:
In every lot there's consolation;
There's trouble, too, in every lot!

These words inspire Christopher to donate the load of wood he intended to sell at the marketplace in Leipzig to Gellert, when his wife tells him the professor lives there in penury. When the two men meet, each is able to affirm the appreciation of his own life through knowing the other, thus affirming the power of Gellert's positive influence on the German people, especially the "common folk."

He wrote an antislavery story, similar to Harriet Beecher Stowe, in Das Landhaus am Rhein ("The Country Manor on the Rhine").

In his later books, of which Auf der Höhe ("On the Heights", 1865) is perhaps the most characteristic, and certainly the most famous, he revealed an unrivaled insight into the soul of the southern German country folk, and especially of the peasants of the Black Forest and the Bavarian Alps. His descriptions are remarkable for their fresh realism, graceful style and humour. In addition to these qualities, his last books are marked by great subtlety of psychological analysis. Auf der Höhe was first published in Stuttgart in 1861, and has been translated into several languages.

Auerbach died at Cannes shortly before his 70th birthday.

== Selected works ==
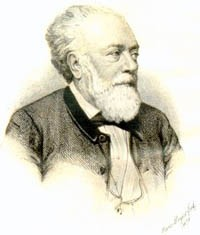
The elderly Auerbach, artist unknown

- Schwarzwälder Dorfgeschichten (Tales of Villages in the Black Forest; 1843)
- Barfüssele (1856)
- Edelweiss (1861)
- Joseph im Schnee (Joseph in the Snow; 1861)
- Auf der Höhe (On the Heights; 1865)
- Das Landhaus am Rhein (A Country House on the Rhein; 1869)
- Waldfried (1874) draws literary inspiration from German unity and the Franco-Prussian War
- Nach dreissig Jahren (1876)
- Der Forstmeister (1879)
- Brigitta (1880)
- Briefe an seinen Freund Jakob Auerbach (Letters to His Friend Jakob Auerbach; posthumous, with a preface by Friedrich Spielhagen, 2 vols., 1884)

== Literature on Auerbach ==
- Andreas W. Daum, Wissenschaftspopularisierung im 19. Jahrhundert: Bürgerliche Kultur, naturwissenschaftliche Bildung und die deutsche Öffentlichkeit, 1848–1914. Munich: Oldenbourg, 1998, ISBN 3-486-56337-8.
- Jonathan Skolnik, "Writing Jewish History Between Gutzkow and Goethe: Auerbach's Spinoza" in Prooftexts: A Journal of Jewish Literary History (1999)
- Gilman, D. C.; Peck, H. T.; Colby, F. M., eds. (1905). "Auerbach, Berthold" . New International Encyclopedia (1st ed.). New York: Dodd, Mead. This work in turn cites:
  - Eugen Zabel, Berthold Auerbach (Berlin, 1882)
- Chisholm, Hugh, ed. (1911). "Auerbach, Berthold" . Encyclopædia Britannica (11th ed.). Cambridge University Press. This work in turn cites Zabel and:
  - Eduard Lasker, Berthold Auerbach, ein Gedenkblatt (1882)
- Rines, George Edwin, ed. (1920). "Auerbach, Berthold" . Encyclopedia Americana. This work in turn cites Zabel, Lasker and:
  - Anton Bettelheim, B. Auerbach, der Mann, sein Werk (1907)
