= Eileen Woestmann =

German politician (born 1993)

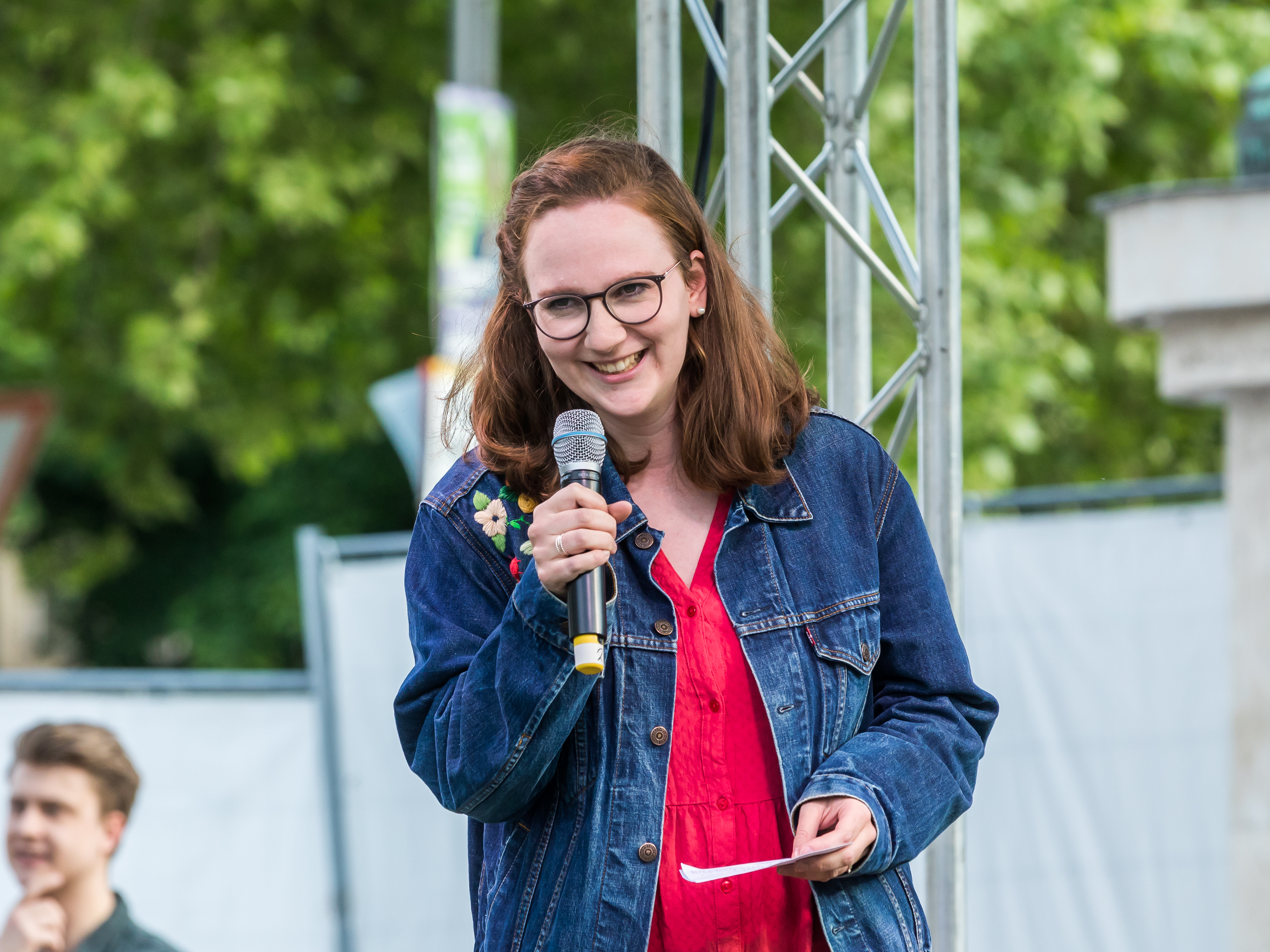
- Woestmann in 2022

Member of the Landtag of North Rhine-Westphalia
- Incumbent
- Assumed office 1 June 2022
- Preceded by: Oliver Kehrl
- Constituency: Cologne I

Personal details
- Born: 13 April 1993 (age 33) Emmendingen
- Party: Alliance 90/The Greens (since 2017)

Eileen Woestmann (born 13 April 1993 in Emmendingen) is a German politician serving as a member of the Landtag of North Rhine-Westphalia since 2022. From 2014 to 2017, she was a municipal councillor of Emmendingen.
