= Patrick Zimmermann =

German professional vert skater (born 1986)

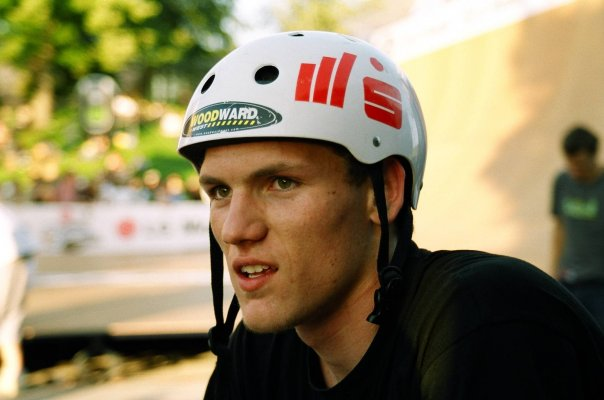

Personal information
- Nationality: German
- Born: August 29, 1986 (age 39) Emmendingen, Germany

Sport
- Sport: Vert skating
Medal record
Competitions
Representing Germany
Bronze medal – third place	2004 German Masters	Vert
Bronze medal – third place	2002 European Championships	Vert

Patrick Zimmermann is a German professional vert skater. Zimmermann started skating when he was ten years old in 1996 and turned professional in 2003. Zimmermann has attended many competitions in his vert skating career.

Best Tricks Frontside 900

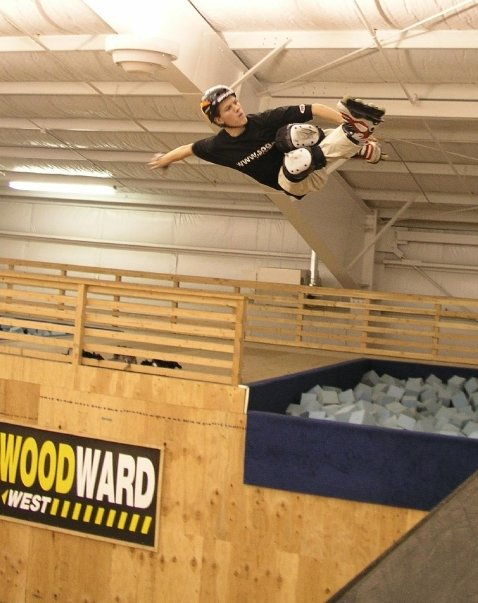
Patrick Vert Skating

== Vert Competitions ==
- 2006 Action Sports US Vert Championship, San Diego, CA - Vert: 8th
- 2006 LG Action Sports World Tour, Berlin, Germany - Vert: 10th
- 2005 LG Action Sports World Championships, Manchester, England - Vert: 8th
- 2005 LG Action Sports Tour, Munich, Germany - Vert: 4th
- 2005 LG Action Sports Tour, Paris, France - Vert: 8th
- 2005 LG Action Sports US Championship - Vert: 9th
- 2005 ASA Pro Tour, Cincinnati, OH: 5th
- 2005 Mobile Skatepark Series: 5th
- 2004 ASA Pro-Tour Year-End Ranking (Vert): 10
- 2004 ASA Pro-Tour, Dulles, VA: 7th
- 2004 ASA Pro-Tour, Cincinnati, OH: 6th
- 2004 German Masters: 3rd
- 2002 European Championships: 3rd
