= Ernst Kirchbach =

German painter

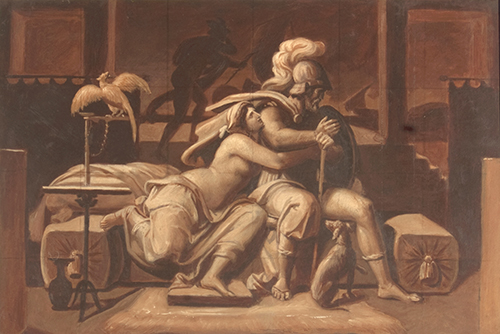
Dido and Aeneas

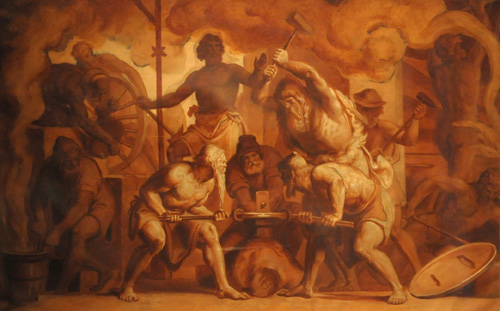
Vulcan's Forge

Ernst Sigismund Kirchbach, or Ernesto Kirchbach (23 April 1831 – 16 August 1876) was a German history and portrait painter, who served as Director of the Academy of Painting (Santiago, Chile).

== Biography ==
He was born in Meißen. He studied at the Dresden Academy of Fine Arts with Julius Schnorr von Carolsfeld, a painter of Biblical subjects. His first major work involved decorative paintings in the Rubens Hall at the Academy, done together with Carolsfeld.

After the failure of the German revolutions of 1848–1849, he went into exile in London. There, he had his own workshop for five years; creating decorative works at what is now the Victoria and Albert Museum. He married one of his fellow exiles; Emma Schmitthenner-Stockhausen, a teacher from Rheinland. They had two sons; Ernst Wolfgang, who became a writer, and Johann Frank, who followed in his father's footsteps as an artist. As soon as they could, they returned to Germany and settled in Dresden. In 1869, he was recruited by Francisco Fernández Rodella, Chile's Consul General in Paris, to become Director of the Academy of Painting (Santiago, Chile), succeeding its founder, the Italian-born artist Alejandro Ciccarelli, who had retired.

He proved to be a controversial teacher. Some of his students, such as Onofre Jarpa and Antonio Smith, preferred him to Ciccarelli and considered him to be progressive. Another of his students, the history painter Pedro Lira, would later write that he was good at drawing, but noticeably deficient at painting, and prone to fits of anger. His teaching methods were sometimes said to be very rigid, and that his students were given little freedom; but the same criticisms had been directed at his predecessor. Regardless of these opinions, it is a fact that, during his administration, only two students, Cosme San Martín and Pedro León Carmona (1853–1899), were able to qualify for scholarships to study in Europe. He did have a passion for the art of the Middle Ages, and little respect for contemporary trends, which may have been a factor.

In addition to his work at the Academia, he designed a ceiling for the Municipal Theater, which was being rebuilt after a fire, and painted portraits of two Chilean presidents. While there, his third son was born; Maximus Paul Ferdinand (1872–1927), who became a musician and music teacher. He was in poor health when his contract expired in 1875, so he returned to Germany and was succeeded by a painter of Italian origin, Juan Mochi. He died in Dresden the following year, aged only forty-five.

== Sources ==
- Pedro Lira, Diccionario biográfico de pintores, Esmeralda, Santiago de Chile, 1902, p. 511 (Online)
- Hans Christoph Graf v. Seherr-Thoß (1977). "Kirchbach". Neue Deutsche Biographie (in German). Vol. 11. Berlin: Duncker & Humblot. pp. 649–650. (full text online).
- Biografía Ernesto Kirchbach @ the Museo Nacional de Bellas Artes (Santiago de Chile)
- Ernesto Kirchberg @ Portal de Arte
