= Jacob Auerbach =

German-Jewish educator & author (1810–1887)

- Born: 14 November 1810; Emmendingen, Grand Duchy of Baden, Rhine Confederation
- Died: 31 October 1887 (aged 76); Frankfurt
- Awards: Order of the Red Eagle

Academic background
- Education: University of Tübingen
- Thesis: Ueber den Kampf und Gegensatz zwischen den Sokratikern und Sophisten (1836)

Jacob Auerbach (14 November 1810 – 31 October 1887) was a German Jewish educator and author.

== Biography ==
Jacob Auerbach was born into a Jewish family in Emmendingen, Baden. His early education was overseen by his father, Marcus, a local teacher, until the age of twelve. He then attended the Pädagogium of the local Latin school, albeit segregated on the designated "Judenbank" ('Jew's bench'). At thirteen, Auerbach moved to Ihringen, dedicating himself to the study of the Talmud. He continued his studies under Stadtrabbiner Hirsch Traub in Mannheim from 1825 to 1827.

From Mannheim, Auerbach went to Carlsruhe, where he attended upper classes of the Lyceum and a course for rabbinical candidates set up by Rabbi Elias Willstaedter. There, in the autumn of 1827, he met and formed a close friendship with his cousin and later brother-in-law, the novelist Berthold Auerbach.

He left the Lyceum in 1832 to attend the University of Heidelberg, where he studied theology, history, and philosophy. Financial constraints forced him to temporarily abandon his studies, but Berthold provided assistance for him to continue. After completing his studies there in 1835, Auerbach became a religious teacher in Wiesbaden, where he became deeply influenced by the reformist Rabbi Abraham Geiger.

On 31 July 1836 he received a doctorate from the University of Tübingen with the dissertation Ueber den Kampf und Gegensatz zwischen den Sokratikern und Sophisten ('On the Struggle and Contrast between the Socratics and Sophists').

After a period teaching in Vienna, Auerbach moved to Frankfurt in 1842, where for almost forty years, he served as a religious teacher in the Jewish community and, from 1848 onwards, at the Gymnasium. Beginning in 1843, he also delivered occasional sermons at the "Andachtssaal." In 1865 he took over the direction of the Julius Flersheim Institute.

He was pensioned by the government in 1879, and honored with the Order of the Red Eagle in recognition of his services at the Frankfurt Gymnasium.

== Publications ==
Auerbach was also a contributor to Geiger's Zeitschrift für jüdische Theologie and Zeitschrift für Wissenschaft und Leben, to Klein's Jahrbuch and its Schul- und Jugendbibliothek, to the Hebrew journal Kerem Ḥemed, and to the Allgemeine Deutsche Biographie.

Among Auerbach's contributions to Jewish history and literature are his essays History of the Jewish Community of Vienna from 1784 (1843) and Lessing and Mendelssohn (1867). His most notable work was the publication of letters exchanged between him and Berthold Auerbach. These letters, spanning from their separation in April 1830 in Carlsruhe to the novelist's death on 8 February 1883, were compiled into two volumes titled Berthold Auerbach's Briefe an seinen Freund Jacob Auerbach, published in Frankfurt in 1884.

Jacob Auerbach also authored several educational works and the Schul- und Haus-Bibel (1858), which gained widespread circulation in Jewish communities across Germany.

=== Partial bibliography ===
- Die Herstellung der Achtung und Ehre Israels vor der Welt [Establishing Respect and Honour for Israel before the World]. Freiburg im Breisgau: Adolph Emmerling. 1840.
- "Sprüche der Vater" [Sayings of the Fathers]. Jahrbuch von Busch. 1842.
- "Kurze Geschichte der israelitischen Gemeinde zu Wien seit 1784" [History of the Jewish Community of Vienna from 1784]. Jahrbuch von Busch. 1843.
- Kleine Schul- und Haus-Bibel [Little Bible for School and Home]. Leipzig: Brockhaus. 1858.
- "Lessing und Mendelssohn" [Lessing and Mendelssohn]. Programm der Isr. Realschule in Frankfurt A. M. 1867.
- "Dem Andenken des Dr. S. Stern" [In Memory of Dr. S. Stern]. Programm der Isr. Realschule zu Frankfurt A. M. 1868.
- Bericht über die zehnjährige Wirksamkeit der Erziehungs-Anstalt der Julius Flersheim'schen Stiftung [Ten-Year Report on the Effectiveness of the Julius Flersheim Foundation's Educational Institution]. Frankfurt a. M.: Kumpf & Reis. 1876.
- Biblische Erzählungen für die israelitische Jugend [Biblical Stories for Jewish Youth]. Vol. 1–2. Leipzig. 1877.
- Berthold Auerbach's Briefe an seinen Freund Jacob Auerbach [Berthold Auerbach's Letters to His Friend Jacob Auerbach]. Vol. 1–2. Frankfurt a. M.: Rütten & Loening. 1884.
