= Zerlach =

- Former municipality
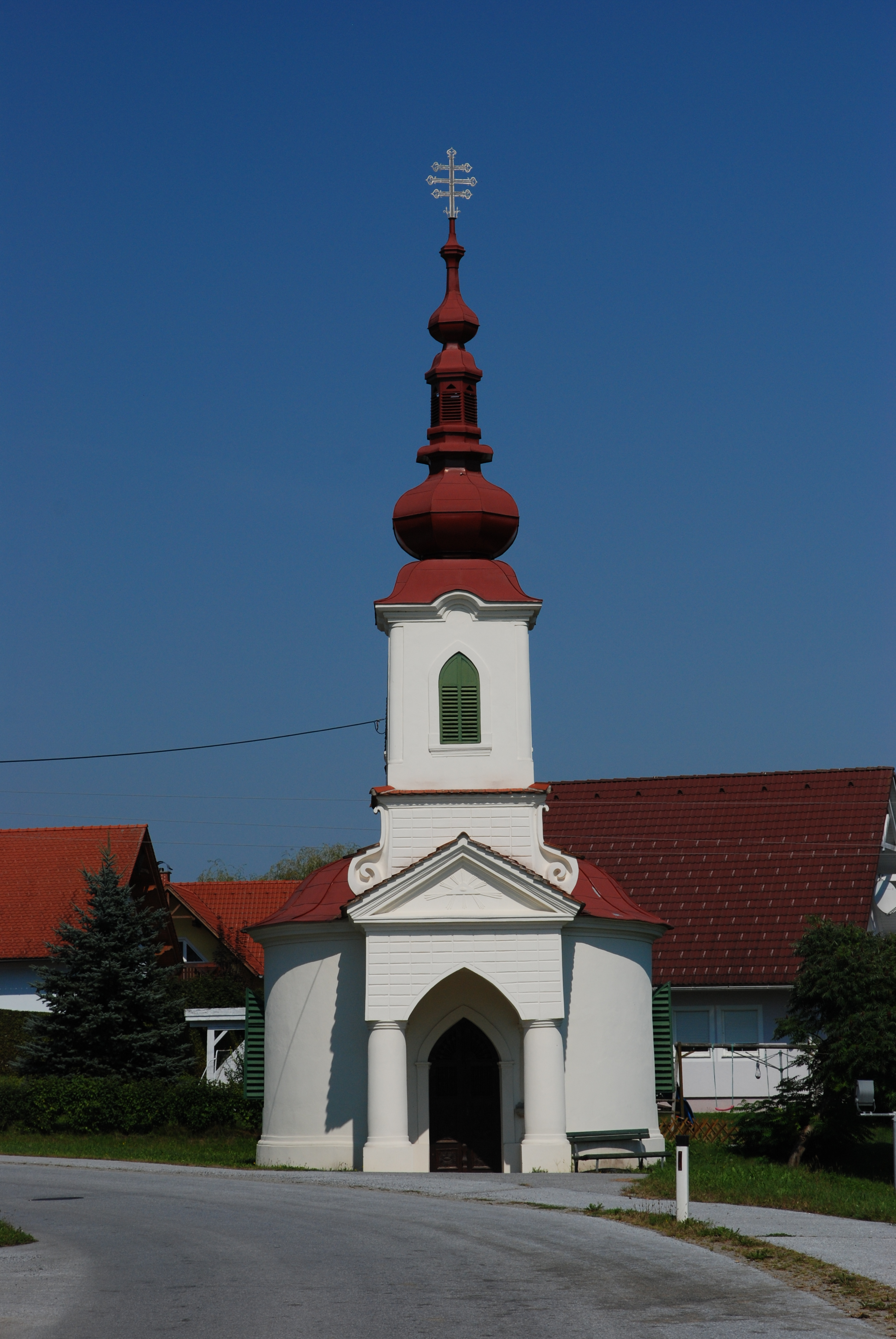

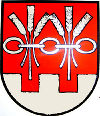
- Coat of arms

- Location within Austria
- Coordinates: 46°56′00″N 15°40′00″E
- Country: Austria
- State: Styria
- District: Südoststeiermark

Area
  - Total: 23.78 km^{2} (9.18 sq mi)
- Elevation: 337 m (1,106 ft)

Population (1 January 2016)
  - Total: 1,713
  - Density: 72.04/km^{2} (186.6/sq mi)
- Time zone: UTC+1 (CET)
  - Summer (DST): UTC+2 (CEST)
- Postal code: 8082
- Area code: +43 3116
- Vehicle registration: FB
- Website: zerlach.gv.at

Zerlach is a former municipality in the district of Südoststeiermark in the Austrian state of Styria. Since the 2015 Styria municipal structural reform, it is part of the municipality Kirchbach-Zerlach.

== Population ==
Historical population
Year	Pop.	±%
1869	1,533	—
1880	1,565	+2.1%
1890	1,550	−1.0%
1900	1,518	−2.1%
1910	1,543	+1.6%
1923	1,558	+1.0%
1934	1,667	+7.0%
1939	1,627	−2.4%
1951	1,569	−3.6%
1961	1,517	−3.3%
1971	1,597	+5.3%
1981	1,584	−0.8%
1991	1,586	+0.1%
2001	1,744	+10.0%
2013	1,890	+8.4%
