= Jewish Museum Emmendingen =

Museum in Germany

Coordinates: 48°07′18″N 7°51′01″E

Jewish Museum Emmendingen, Baden-Württemberg

The Jewish Museum (German: Jüdisches Museum Emmendingen) in Emmendingen in Baden-Württemberg, Germany, was opened on April 13, 1997, in a half-timbered house on Castle Square in the city center in the immediate vicinity of the former synagogue that was destroyed in 1938. In the basement one can visit the nineteenth century mikvah that was restored and is a protected monument. On the ground floor there is an exhibition on the history of the Jewish community in Emmendingen between 1716 and 1940. The fate of Emmendingen Jews under the Nazi regime is clearly documented. Moreover, the museum displays objects regarding Jewish religious and everyday life. Jewish holidays during the course of the year are explained in detail. On the upper floor there is a reading and meeting room with literature and videos about Judaism and Jewish history.

== See also ==
- History of the Jews in Germany

== Literature ==
- Jüdisches Leben in Emmendingen (Jewish Life in Emmendingen), 32 pages, Medien und Dialog publishing house, Haigerloch
- Emma Schwarz: Emmendingen – Gurs – Johannesburg, a Jewish woman from Emmendingen writes about her life under the Nazi regime and her later emigration with her son to South Africa. The booklet is obtainable in the museum.
