= Kirchbach in Steiermark =

- Former municipality
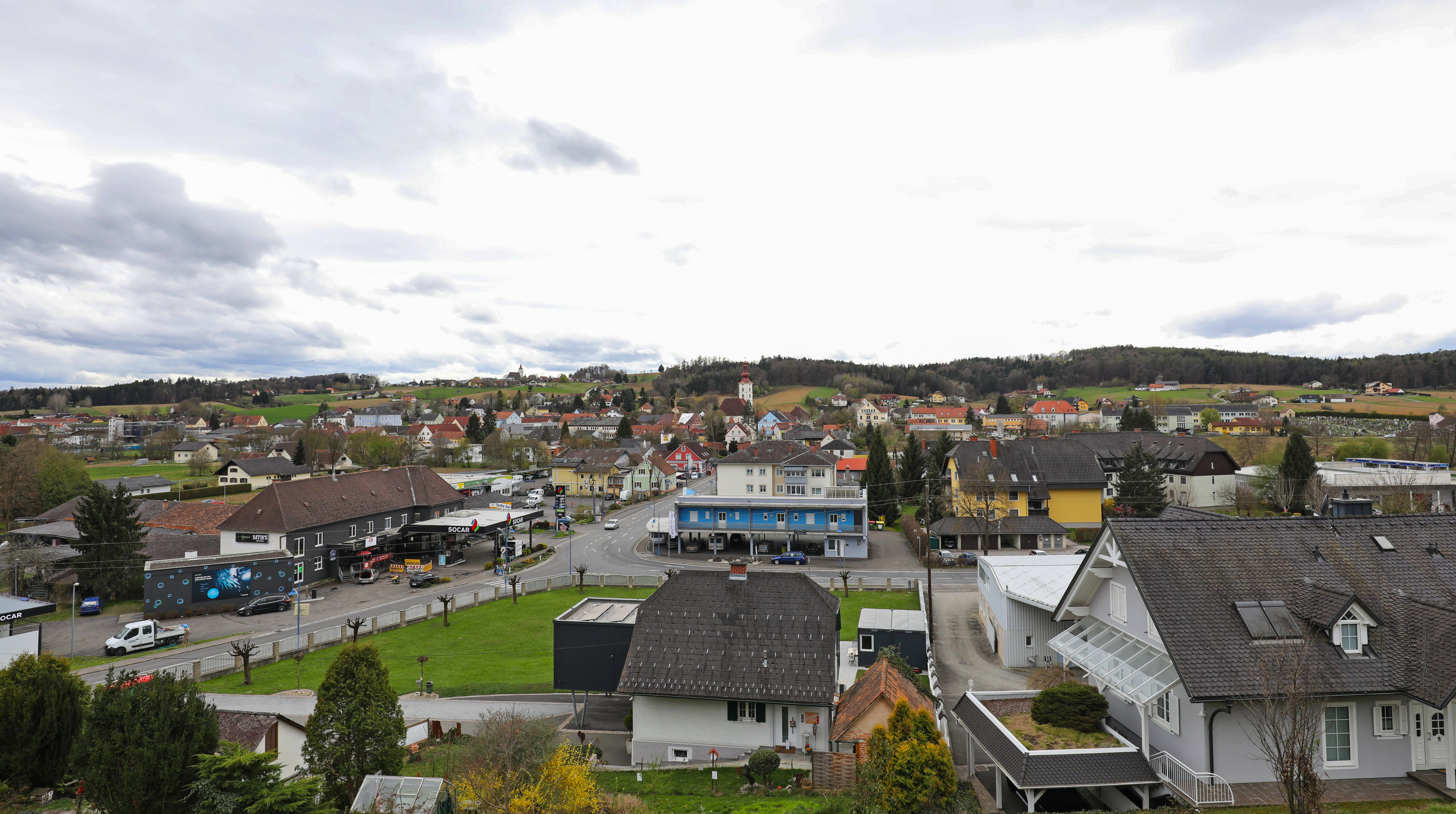
- Kirchbach

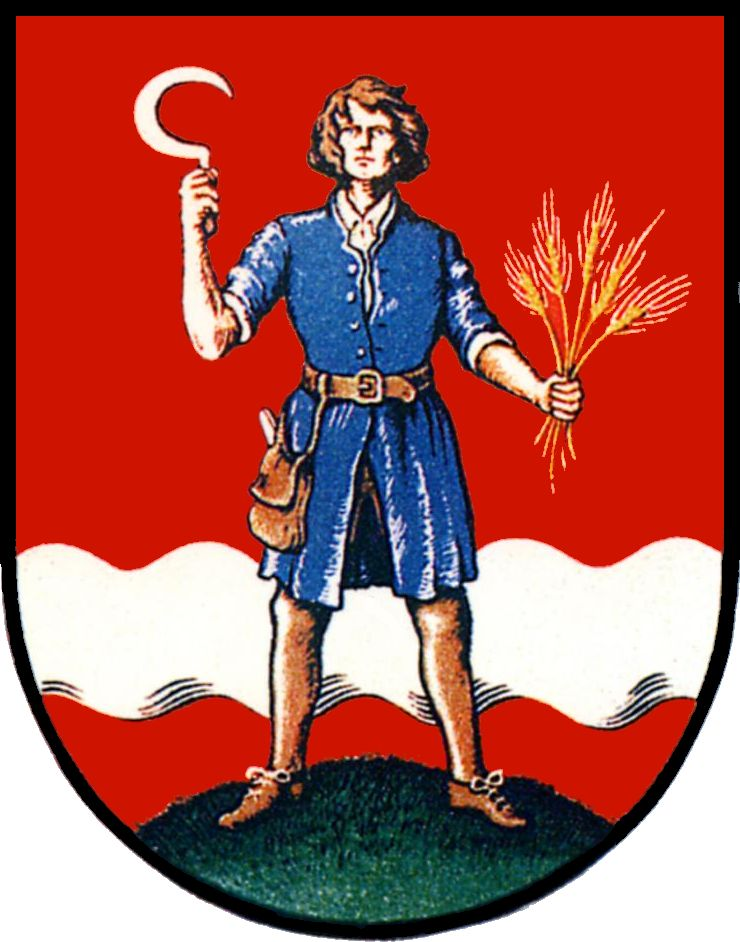
- Coat of arms

- Location within Austria
- Coordinates: 46°56′00″N 15°40′00″E
- Country: Austria
- State: Styria
- District: Südoststeiermark

Area
  - Total: 15.19 km^{2} (5.86 sq mi)
- Elevation: 334 m (1,096 ft)

Population (1 January 2016)
  - Total: 1,555
  - Density: 102.4/km^{2} (265.1/sq mi)
- Time zone: UTC+1 (CET)
  - Summer (DST): UTC+2 (CEST)
- Postal code: 8082
- Area code: +43 3116
- Vehicle registration: FB
- Website: www.kirchbach.at

Kirchbach in Steiermark is a former municipality in the district of Südoststeiermark in the Austrian state of Styria. Since the 2015 Styria municipal structural reform, it is part of the municipality Kirchbach-Zerlach.

== Population ==
Historical population
Year	Pop.	±%
1869	1,280	—
1880	1,308	+2.2%
1890	1,332	+1.8%
1900	1,322	−0.8%
1910	1,336	+1.1%
1923	1,332	−0.3%
1934	1,355	+1.7%
1939	1,284	−5.2%
1951	1,428	+11.2%
1961	1,361	−4.7%
1971	1,436	+5.5%
1981	1,463	+1.9%
1991	1,561	+6.7%
2001	1,651	+5.8%
2013	1,532	−7.2%
