= Wolfgang Kirchbach =

German writer

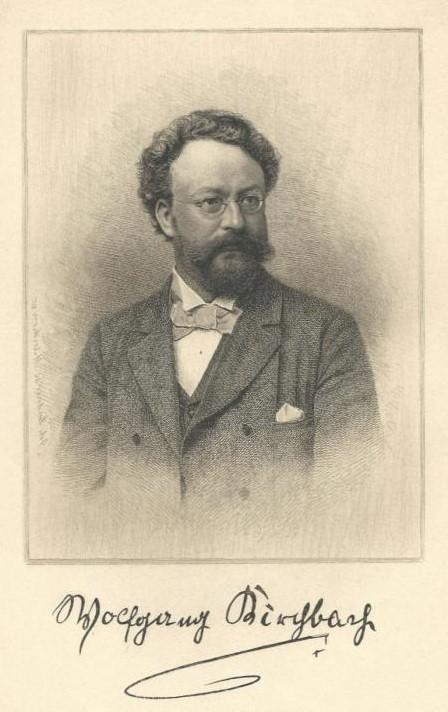
Wolfgang Kirchbach; engraving by Johann Lindner (1895)

Ernst Wolfgang Kirchbach (18 September 1857, in London, England – 8 September 1906, in Bad Nauheim) was a German critic and writer.

== Biography ==
He was the son of German artist Ernst Kirchbach and his wife Emma née Schmitthenner-Stockhausen. He studied philosophy and history in Dresden and Leipzig. Settling in Dresden in 1888, he was editor of the Magazin für Litteratur des In- und Auslandes (Magazine for domestic and foreign literature). Beginning 1896, he lived in Berlin. and became a leading member of the "Giordano Bruno Bund" of freethinking intellectuals.

== Works ==
- Märchen (Tales, 1879)
- Salvator Rosa, a romance (1880)
- Gedichte (Poems, 1883)
- Das Leben auf der Walze (Life on rollers, 1892)
- Die letzten Menschen, a drama (The last people, 1892)
- Miniaturen (Stuttgart 1892)
- Des Sonnenreichs Untergang (Twilight of the sun's realm, Dresden, 1895)
- Gordon Pascha (Dresden, 1895)
- Eginhardt und Emma (ib. 1896)
- Der Lieder vom Zweirad (Song of the bicycle, 1900)
