= Hans Freiherr von Geyer zu Lauf =

German painter

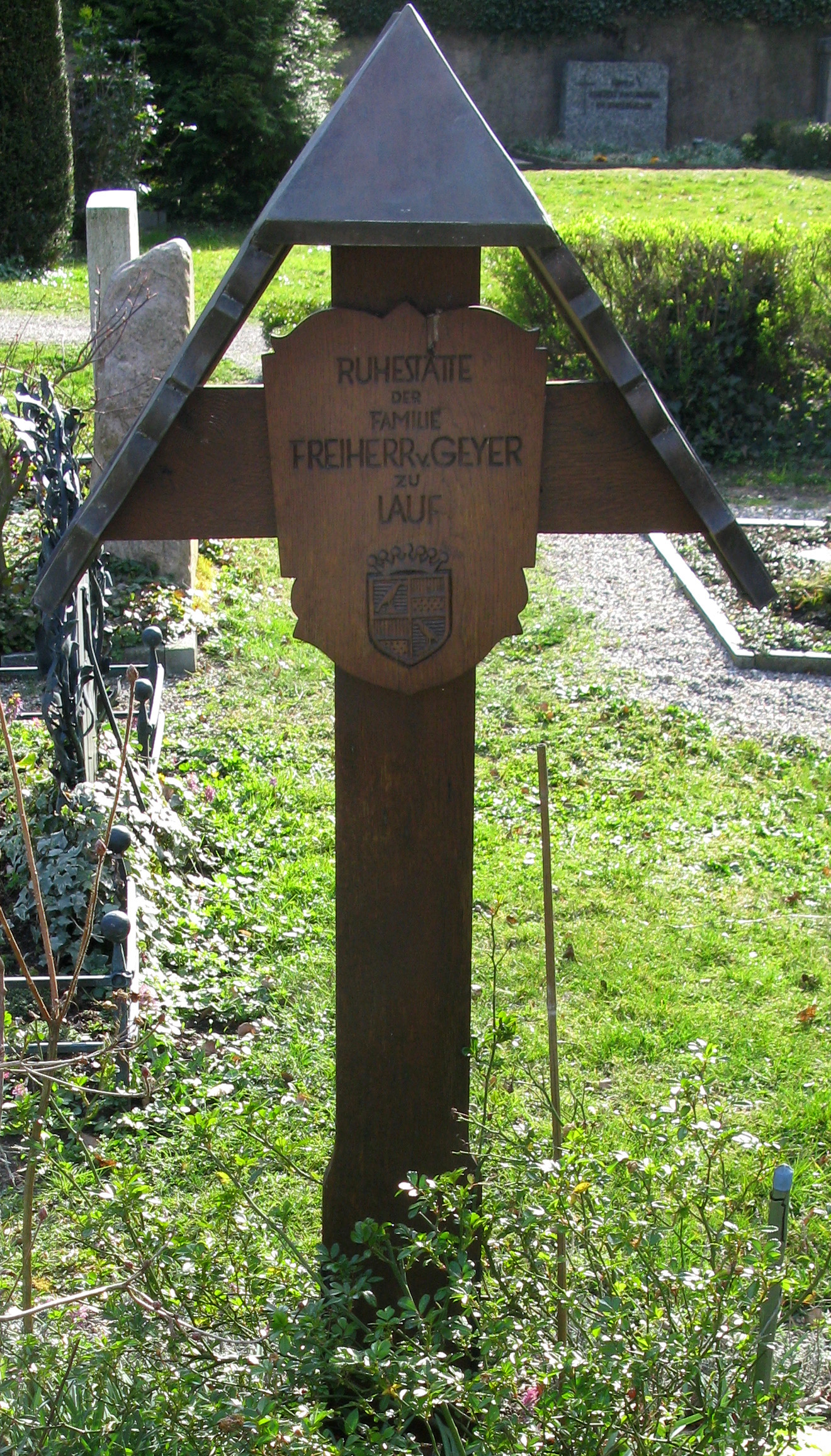
- Grave of the Family Geyer zu Lauf in Freiburg-Günterstal
- Born: 1895; Freiburg
- Died: 1959 (aged 63–64); Freiburg
- Occupations: visual artist, painter

Hans Freiherr von Geyer zu Lauf (14 January 1895 – 10 August 1959) was a German painter who was born in Freiburg and grew up in the suburb Günterstal. In 1917 he moved to Dießen am Ammersee and in 1919 to Schönberg on the Hessische Bergstraße. From 1940 he lived again in Freiburg, this time in a studio apartment which was destroyed during the air raid on Freiburg in 1944 whereupon he returned to the Bergstraße. In 1945, after the end of the war, he moved to Emmendingen and finally in 1954 back to Freiburg where lived until his death in a car accident in 1959.

The panel painting "A Cosmic Song" is the main work of the painter.

== Collection Geyer zu Lauf ==
In 1997 the Circle of Friends Geyer zu Lauf installed a permanent exhibition of paintings, drawings and graphics of all the creative phases of the artist in the former Hodel brewery in Emmendingen. His major work, the Panel Painting, which was only loan in the exhibition, was sold by the owner in 2008. However, the second wife and widow of the painter, Isolde von Geyer zu Lauf who was born on 27 February 1911 and died on 28 May 2011 appointed the Circle of Friends sole heir and thus the collection increased enormously, and it became necessary to store it away. While it is archived it is not possible to visit it.

== See also ==
- List of German painters
