= Emmendingen =

- Town
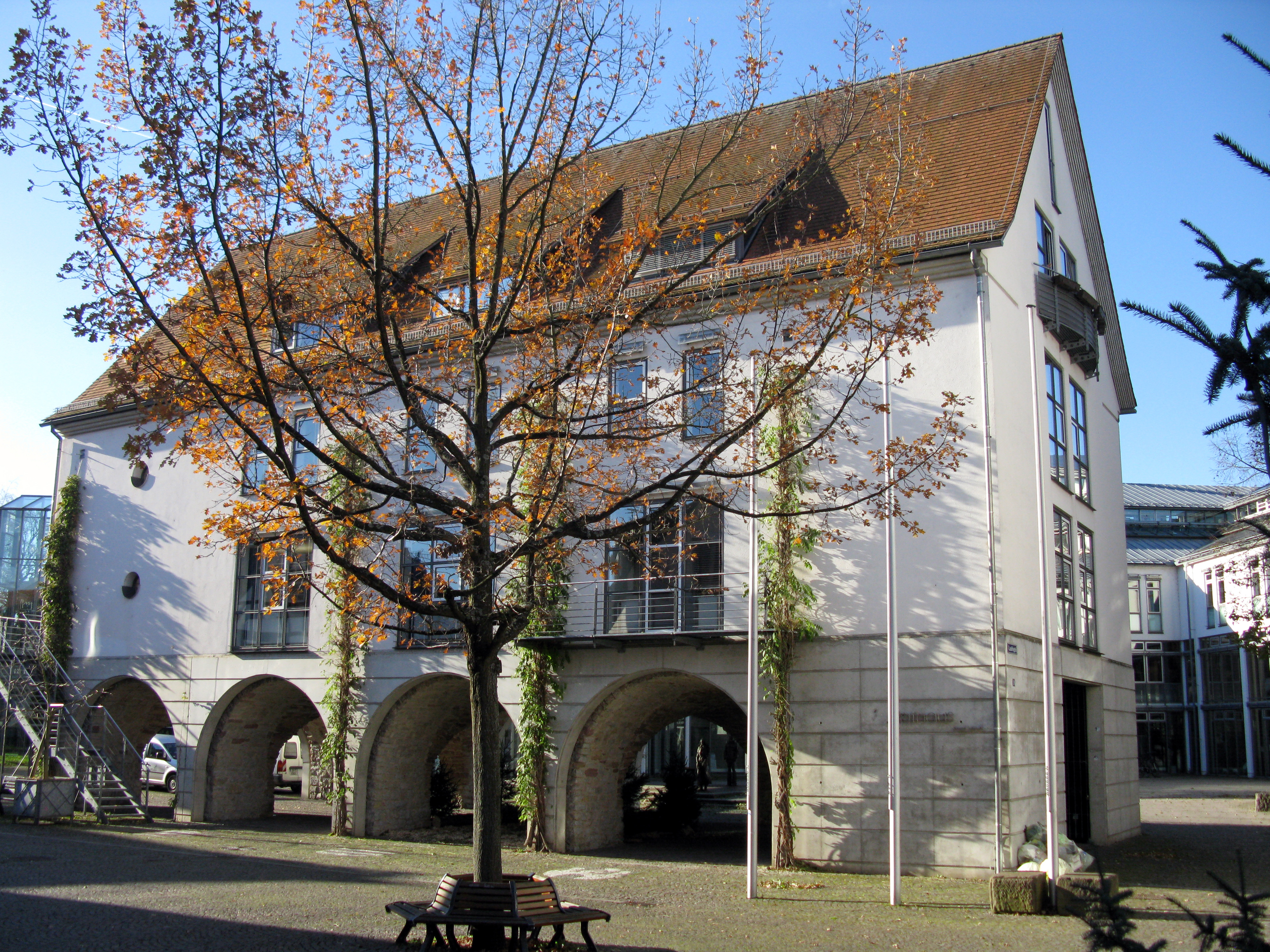
- Town hall

- Coat of arms

- Location of Emmendingen within Emmendingen district
- Interactive map of Emmendingen
- Location within Germany Location within Baden-Württemberg
- Coordinates: 48°7′17″N 7°50′57″E
- Country: Germany
- State: Baden-Württemberg
- Admin. region: Freiburg
- District: Emmendingen
- Subdivisions: 6

Government
  - Mayor (2020–28): Stefan Schlatterer (CDU)

Area
  - Total: 33.78 km^{2} (13.04 sq mi)
- Elevation: 201 m (659 ft)

Population (2025-12-31)
  - Total: 29,530
  - Density: 874.2/km^{2} (2,264/sq mi)
- Time zone: UTC+01:00 (CET)
  - Summer (DST): UTC+02:00 (CEST)
- Postal codes: 79301–79312
- Dialling codes: 07641
- Vehicle registration: EM
- Website: www.emmendingen.de

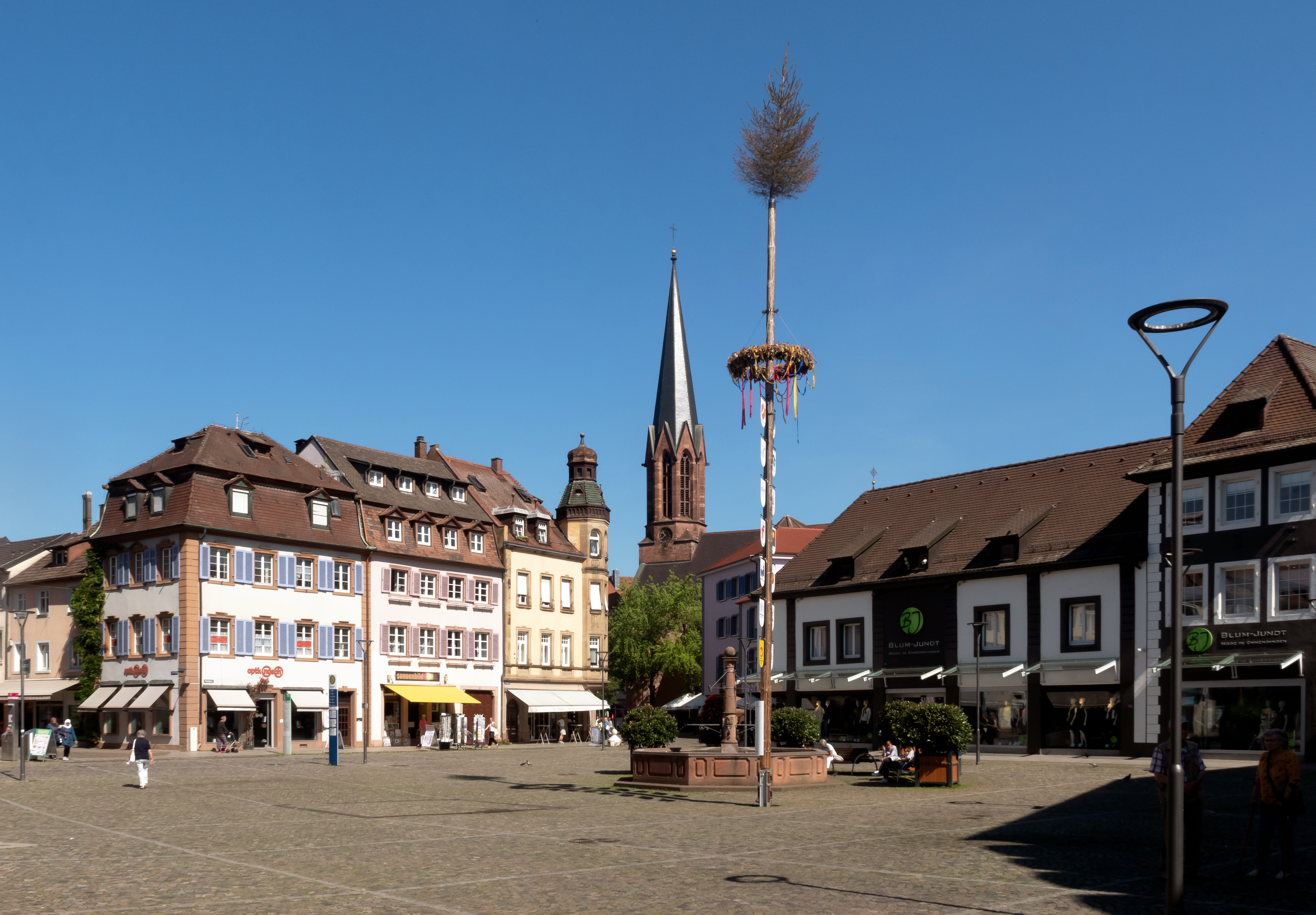
Emmendingen, Marktplatz with churchtower (Evangelische Stadtkirche)

Emmendingen (German pronunciation: [ˈɛmənˌdɪŋən]; Low Alemannic: Emmedinge) is a town in Baden-Württemberg, capital of the district Emmendingen of Germany. It is located at the Elz River, 14 km (8.7 mi) north of Freiburg im Breisgau. The town contains more than 26,000 residents, which is the most in the Emmendingen district.

== Neighbour cities ==
Emmendingen is bordered by several cities and municipalities; clockwise from the north: Malterdingen, Kenzingen, Freiamt (Black Forest), Sexau, Denzlingen, Reute (Breisgau), Windenreute, Maleck and Teningen.

== History ==
The first mention of this town in a document dates back to 1091, however it is much older. It was the seat of the counts of Hochberg, a cadet branch of the Margraviate of Baden. In 1418 it received market rights from the emperor, and in 1590 was raised to the status of a town, and walled, by Margrave Jacob III.

The author Johann Georg Schlosser (1739–1799), a brother-in-law of Goethe, was Oberamtmann (bailiff) for a few years.

There was also a neighboring town called Nieder-Emmendingen. The towns merged in 1883.

== Politics ==
2014 local election

The local election with a voter turnout of 46.80% (2009: 48.5%) led to the following results:

2014 local election results
Party	%	Seats	W/L
CDU	25.8 %	7	± 0
SPD	24.3 %	7	+ 2
Greens	24.7 %	6	1
FWV	16.0 %	4	± 0
FDP	9.2 %	2	1

=== Mayor ===
A mayor and twelve counsels have led the city since 1590. The day-to-day affairs were taken care of by the city clerk. The councillors were also judges, who met several times a year for sessions, appointed Schultheißen by the margrave. In the 18th century there were deputies in addition to the council and the mayor. Since the 19th century there has only been a mayor and the local councillors. Since the promotion of Emmendingen to a large district capital, the district leader has the official title of "Oberbürgermeister" (a mayor of an administrative region). This position is now directly elected by the electorate for a term of office of eight years. He is chairman of the local council. The general deputy is the first council member with the official title of "Mayor".

The mayor and the lord mayor since 1883 (still incomplete):

- 1830–1833: Johann Philipp Sonntag
- 1833–1835: Carl Helbing
- 1876–1877: Gustav Wagner
- 1878–1891: Andreas Roll
- 1891–1897: Wilhelm Schneider
- 1897–1921: Albert Rehm
- 1921–1945: Franz Hirt (Centre, NSDAP)
- April 1945: Albert Hof (National Socialist German Worker's Party)
- 1945–1981: Karl Faller (NSDAP, CDU)
- 1981–1988: Hans-Peter Schlatterer (Independent)
- 1988–2004: Ulrich Niemann (SPD)
- since 2004: Stefan Schlatterer (CDU)

=== Administration ===
Together with the municipalities of Freiamt, Teningen, Teningen, and Sexau, the city of Emmendingen forms the association of administrations which began on 1 January 1975 for the purpose of the establishment of the land use plan for the districts of the participating municipalities.

Coat of arms

The Coat of arms of the city of Emmendingen depicts a red bend in a gold escutcheon (which is the old coat of arms for Baden), an armoured knight on a blue background with a silver rod in his right hand and his left hand on a silver sword hanging around his waist. The city flag is blue, yellow, and red. The coat of arms was adopted during the elevation of the city to a district capital. It depicts the symbol of the coat of arms of the local lord (the bend) and the knight which symbolises the ability to put up a fight. Previously, instead of the knight, a ploughshare was printed in the seals. Initially the knight stood on a trimount. The current depiction was adopted in 1960.

== Geography ==
The town lies in Breisgau, between the foothills of the Black Forest and the Kaiserstuhl which rises out of the Rhine plain to the north of Freiburg. The land is between 189 and 368 metres (620 and 1,207 ft) high. On the western edge of Emmendingen flows the Elz river, which divides shortly after its confluence with the Dreisam and Glotter near Riegel, into the Old Elz and the Leopoldskanal, which both flow into the Rhine. The Leopoldskanal was built in the middle 19th century.

=== Climate ===
The climate in this area is close to a Mediterranean microclimate, and there is adequate rainfall year-round. However, more year-round rain occurs than in the Rhine plateau because of the closeness to the Black Forest. The Köppen Climate Classification subtype for this climate is "Cfb" (Marine West Coast Climate/Oceanic climate). However, it is close to being humid subtropical (Cfa) due to the mean temperatures in July and August just under 22 °C (72 °F). The city is close to the Kaiserstuhl, a range of hills of volcanic origin located a few miles away which is considered to be one of the warmest places of Germany and therefore considered as a viticultural area.

Climate data for Emmendingen (Mundingen) 2015-2020
Month	Jan	Feb	Mar	Apr	May	Jun	Jul	Aug	Sep	Oct	Nov	Dec	Year
Record high °C (°F)	15.9 (60.6)	20.3 (68.5)	24.0 (75.2)	29.5 (85.1)	33.3 (91.9)	37.1 (98.8)	37.7 (99.9)	38.5 (101.3)	32.3 (90.1)	28.1 (82.6)	23.8 (74.8)	18.0 (64.4)	38.5 (101.3)
Mean daily maximum °C (°F)	6.2 (43.2)	8.1 (46.6)	12.8 (55.0)	17.0 (62.6)	20.7 (69.3)	25.4 (77.7)	27.5 (81.5)	26.4 (79.5)	22.6 (72.7)	16.3 (61.3)	10.7 (51.3)	7.9 (46.2)	16.8 (62.2)
Daily mean °C (°F)	2.7 (36.9)	3.5 (38.3)	6.9 (44.4)	10.5 (50.9)	14.7 (58.5)	19.2 (66.6)	21.1 (70.0)	20.0 (68.0)	15.5 (59.9)	10.7 (51.3)	6.4 (43.5)	4.1 (39.4)	11.3 (52.3)
Mean daily minimum °C (°F)	−1.1 (30.0)	−0.4 (31.3)	1.3 (34.3)	3.7 (38.7)	8.4 (47.1)	12.9 (55.2)	13.8 (56.8)	13.0 (55.4)	9.2 (48.6)	5.6 (42.1)	2.1 (35.8)	0.3 (32.5)	5.8 (42.4)
Record low °C (°F)	−15.5 (4.1)	−12.1 (10.2)	−5.2 (22.6)	−3.3 (26.1)	1.7 (35.1)	5.9 (42.6)	5.7 (42.3)	5.7 (42.3)	0.6 (33.1)	−2.5 (27.5)	−6.9 (19.6)	−6.7 (19.9)	−6.8 (19.8)
Average precipitation mm (inches)	63 (2.5)	44 (1.7)	43 (1.7)	69 (2.7)	119 (4.7)	93 (3.7)	47 (1.9)	73 (2.9)	52 (2.0)	47 (1.9)	55 (2.2)	44 (1.7)	749 (29.5)
Average precipitation days (≥ 0.2 mm)	14.9	13.4	16.0	13.0	15.1	12.3	15.1	14.8	11.7	15.7	16.7	15.3	173.9
Average rainy days (≥ 0.2 mm)	13	10	15	14	17	16	12	13	11	14	14	14	163
Average snowy days (≥ 0.2 cm)	3.4	0.8	0.4	0.2	0	0	0	0	0	0	0.4	3.0	8.2
Mean monthly sunshine hours	71.7	96.3	136.3	167.5	199.5	249.6	238.9	219.9	165.9	117.3	70.6	60.3	1,793.8
Source 1: Weather-Online
Source 2:

== Economy and Industry ==
Employees subject to insurance: 10,117 (As of: 31 December 2012), This includes the areas of:

- Manufacturing Industry: 1,425
- Commerce, Transport, Hospitality Industry: 1,977
- Other services: 6,700

Transport

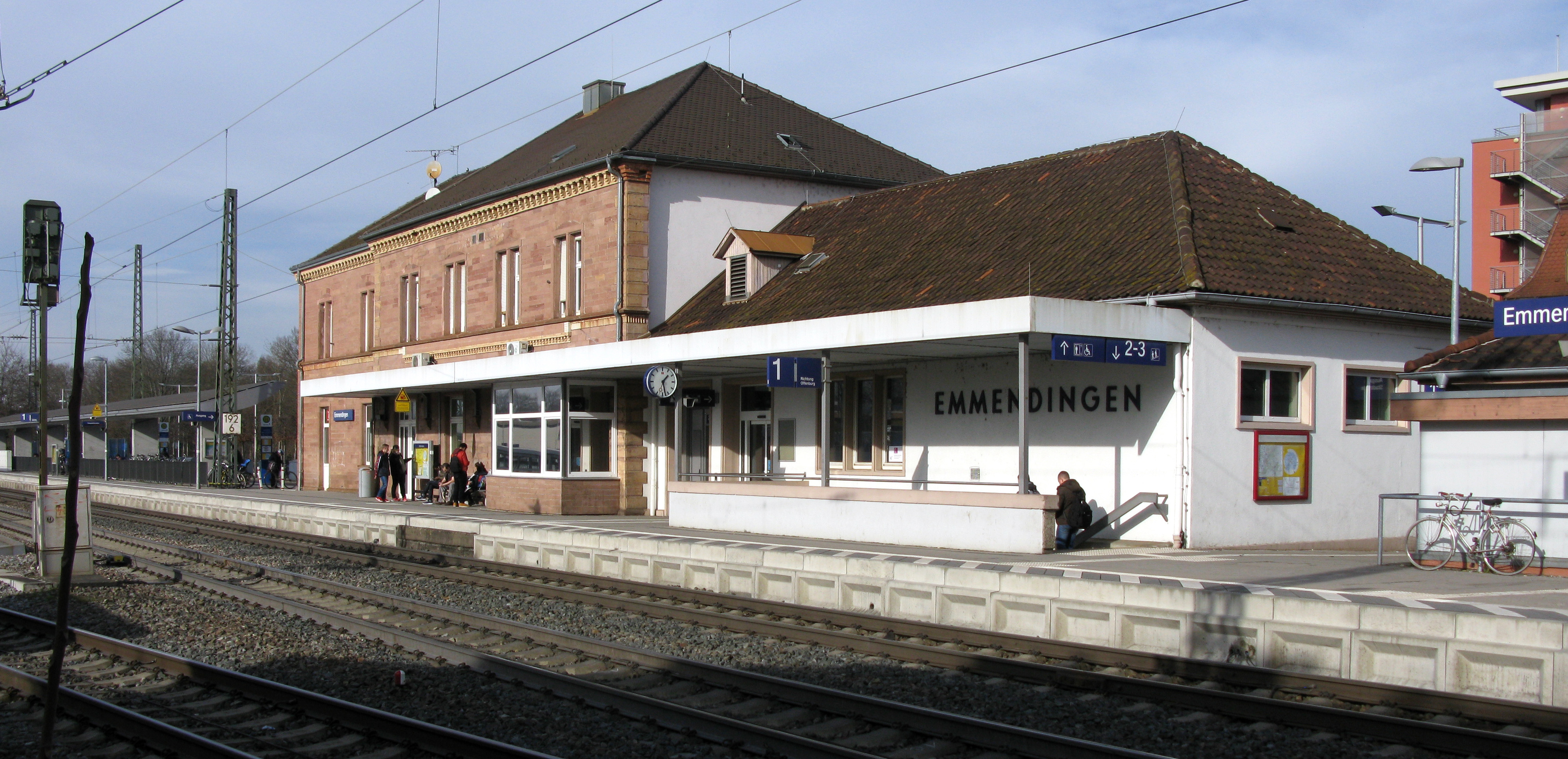
Emmendingen station

Emmendingen does not have a direct connection to the motorway. The nearest slip road is in Teningen to Federal Motorway 5 which runs to Karlsruhe and to Basel. The Bundesstraße 3 (Offenburg-Freiburg im Breisgau) runs through the city. Emmendingen lies on the Baden Main Line between Mannheim and Basel. Regional-Express trains to Basel and Offenburg run every hour. In addition to the station, there are bus stops in districts of Kollmarsreute and Mundingen (part of Teningen-Mundingen). Within the city there are six bus lines (1 to Bürkle-Bleiche, 2 to Bürkle-Bleiche, 3 to the lower city, 5 to Windenreute and Maleck, 6 to Mundingen and 9 to the industrial estate Über der Elz) and two dial-a-taxi lines (4 to the district hospital and 10 to Kastelburg). A Teningen city bus line (8) connects Teningen (as well as Nimburg and Bottingen in Teningen depending on the time of day) to the central station in Emmendingen. The city belongs to the Regio-Verkehrsverbund Freiburg. From the Zentralen Omnibusbahnhof (ZOB, Central Bus Station) at the train station, regional buses go to Freiburg, Herbolzheim, Kenzingen, Heimbach, Waldkirch, Denzlingen, Vörstetten, Reute, Bahlingen, Riegel, Sasbach and Freiamt.

The nearest Airports are Lahr, Freiburg, and Basel.

Agencies and Courts

As the administrative district capital city, Emmendingen is the seat for the Administrative District of the same name. Additionally, there is a Tax Office and an Employment Agency as well as a Magistrates' Court, which belongs to the Judicial District Freiburg im Breisgau and the Oberlandsgericht district.

The city is also the seat of the Emmendingen Church District for the Protestant Church in Baden. The Catholic Endingen-Waldkirch Deanery of also has its seat in Emmendingen.

The post was first established in 1745 as a Posthalterei. In 1811, this was converted to a Postexpedition and since 1876 there has been a third class Postamt.

There is also a police headquarters in Emmendingen with a criminal investigation department and the Emmendingen police station. Finally, Emmendingen is also the seat of the Emmendingen Settlement Centre and since 2 April 2012, it is also the seat of the first central Registry of Deeds in the state of Baden-Württemberg.

Media

The local newspaper Badische Zeitung from Freiburg im Breisgau and the free weekly newspaper "Emmendinger Tor" cover the local events and have been delivered to all households since 1974.

Educational Institutions

Two years after the start of the Reformation (1556) the first primary school was set up in Emmendingen. In addition to the Goethe Gymnasium School, which was converted from a Latin School in 1667, there are the Margrave Realschule, the Fritz Boehle Hauptschule and Werkrealschule, the Margrave Grund- and Hauptschule and Workrealschule as well as the C.F. Meerwein School and the Fritz Boehle Grundschule, which provide basic education in the city centre. Additionally, primary schools can be found in Kollmarsreute, Mundigen, Wasser, and Windenreute. The city also contains the Karl-Friedrich special-needs school.

The Emmendingen Administrative District supports the Commercial and Home Management Schools and the Carl Helbing Mercantile School as well as the Eduard Spranger School for the Developmentally Challenged and Kindergarten School for developmentally Challenged Children in Wasser where the State School and Home for the Physically Challenged (Funding: State of Baden-Württemberg). Further out there is also the Hochburg State School of Agriculture in Windenreute.

The North Breisgau Community College, which includes the Emmendingen Integrative Waldorf school (common teaching of students with and without disabilities), the North Breisgau music school and the School of Health and Nursing in the Emmendingen administrative district rounds off the list of schools available in Emmendingen.

Since 2006 there has also been a Jewish school in Emmendingen which offers different subjects dealing with Jewish culture, e.g. Synagogue architecture, Jewish religion, Jewish philosophy, and history of the Jews e.g. in Germany. A Hebrew language course is also offered for beginners and intermediate learners. The Jewish school is a cooperation of the Emmendingen Jewish congregation and the registered Emmendingen Association for Jewish History and Culture.

Hospitals

The Emmendingen administrative district contains the Emmendingen district hospital. Additionally, there is also the Emmendingen Centre for Psychiatry as an Institution under Public Law. Both facilities are academic teaching hospitals within the School of Medicine at the Albert-Ludwigs-University of Freiburg.

Recreational and Athletic Facilities

Emmendingen has an open-air pool and a skate park with a (concrete) fun box, several sport and event halls (Goethe Halle, Hermann Günth Hall, Steinhalle und Fritz Boehle Hall, Karl-Faller-Halle, Elzhalle), Gymnastic Association sports grounds, and several football pitches (including the grass and indoor grounds of the Emmendingen Centre for Psychiatry and the Goethe Recreational Ground).

Around Emmendingen there are six football clubs (FC Emmendingen, FV Windenreute, SV Wasser, SV Kollmarsreute, SV Mundingen, ÜTSE Emmendingen). Windenreute, Wasser, and Kollmarsreute combined have also founded a youth league as well as men's league. These teams each have a football pitch with the exception of ÜTSE Emmendingen. FC Emmendingen play in the Elz Stadium. Additionally, the amateur pilots club C.F. Meerwein is also located in Emmendingen.

== Twin towns – sister cities ==
Emmendingen is twinned with:

- Newark-on-Trent, England, United Kingdom
- Sandomierz, Poland
- Six-Fours-les-Plages, France

== Culture ==
Emmendingen is a small town, but that does not mean that it lacks in interesting details. Listed are just a few of Emmendingen's claims to fame.

=== Cornelia Schlosser ===
Cornelia Schlosser (maiden name: Cornelia Friederica Christiana Goethe) was the only sibling of Johann Wolfgang von Goethe, and lived with her husband Johann Georg Schlosser in a house on the main square in Emmendingen. Today their house is the municipal library.

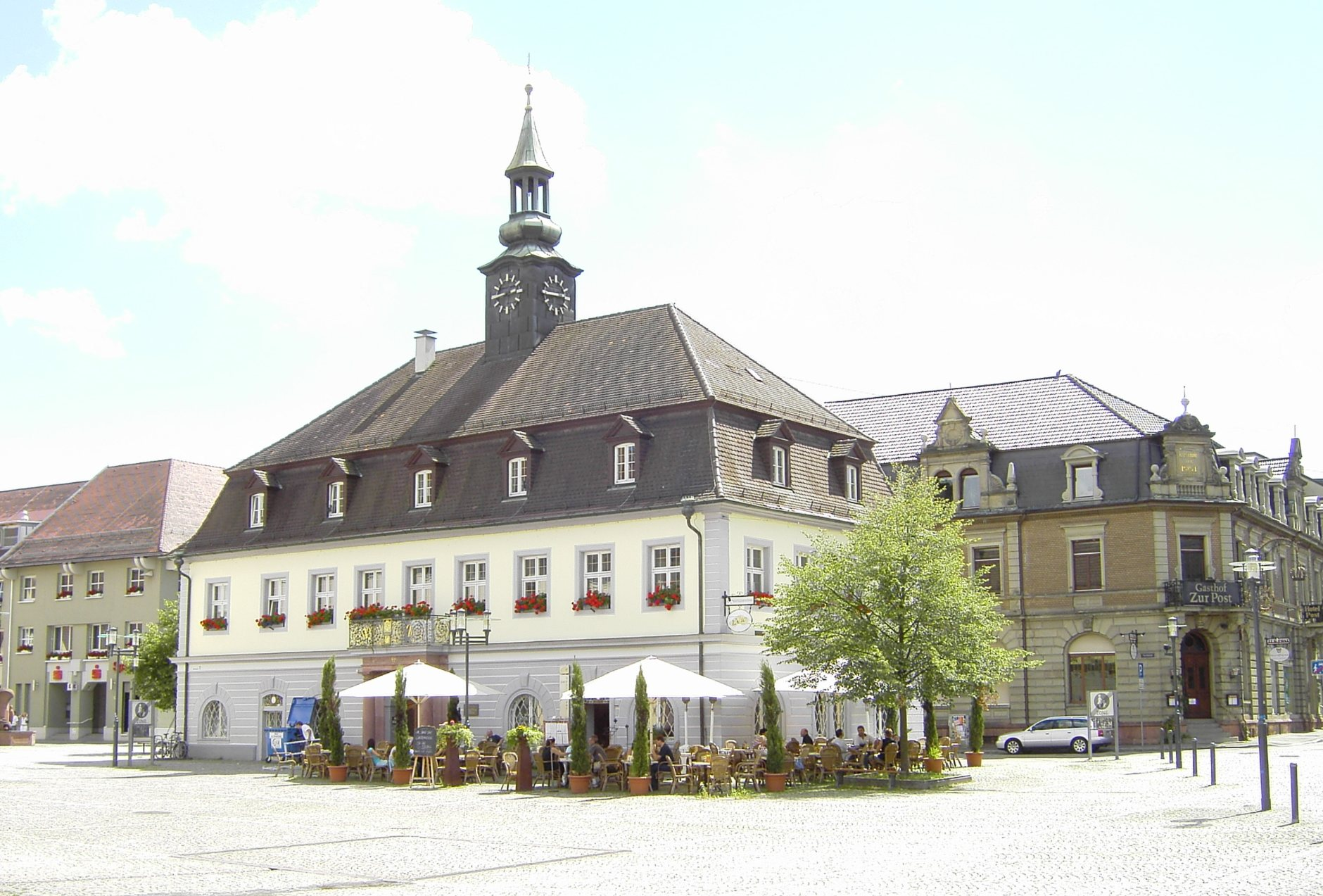
The main square of Emmendingen and the old town hall. This building is now used as the German Diary Archive.

=== Old Town Hall ===
The old Emmendingen town hall is on the main square of town, though a new town hall was built recently. Today the building is still utilized, but it is now home to the only archive of diaries in Germany.

== Points of interest ==
- Jewish Museum on Castle Square
- Collection Geyer zu Lauf
- German Diary Archive

== Notable people ==
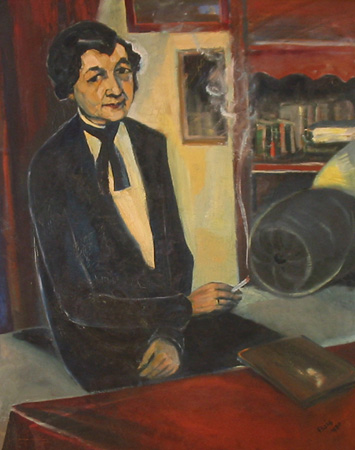
Harriet Straub 1930 by Waldemar Flaig

- Jacob Auerbach (1810–1887), Jewish educator and author.
- Harriet Straub, (DE Wiki) (1872-1945), physician and writer.
- Fritz Boehle (1873–1916), German painter, drawer and sculptor, linked with Völkisch movement
- Rolf Schweizer (1936–2016), composer, choirmaster and church music director
- Eileen Woestmann (born 1993), politician

=== Sport ===
- Walter Mößinger (1949–2024), artistic gymnast, competed at the 1972 Summer Olympics
- Angelika Kern (born 1952), gymnast, competed at the 1968 and 1972 Summer Olympics
- Jan Männer (born 1982), footballer, played 140 games
- Dennis Bührer (born 1983), soccer player, played 407 games
- Patrick Zimmermann (born 1986), vert skater
- Anne Kaiser, (DE Wiki) (born 1987), soccer player (Bundesliga), played 91 games
- Jens Schöngarth (born 1988), handball player, played 18 games for Germany men's national handball team
