= Kirchbach-Zerlach =

- Municipality
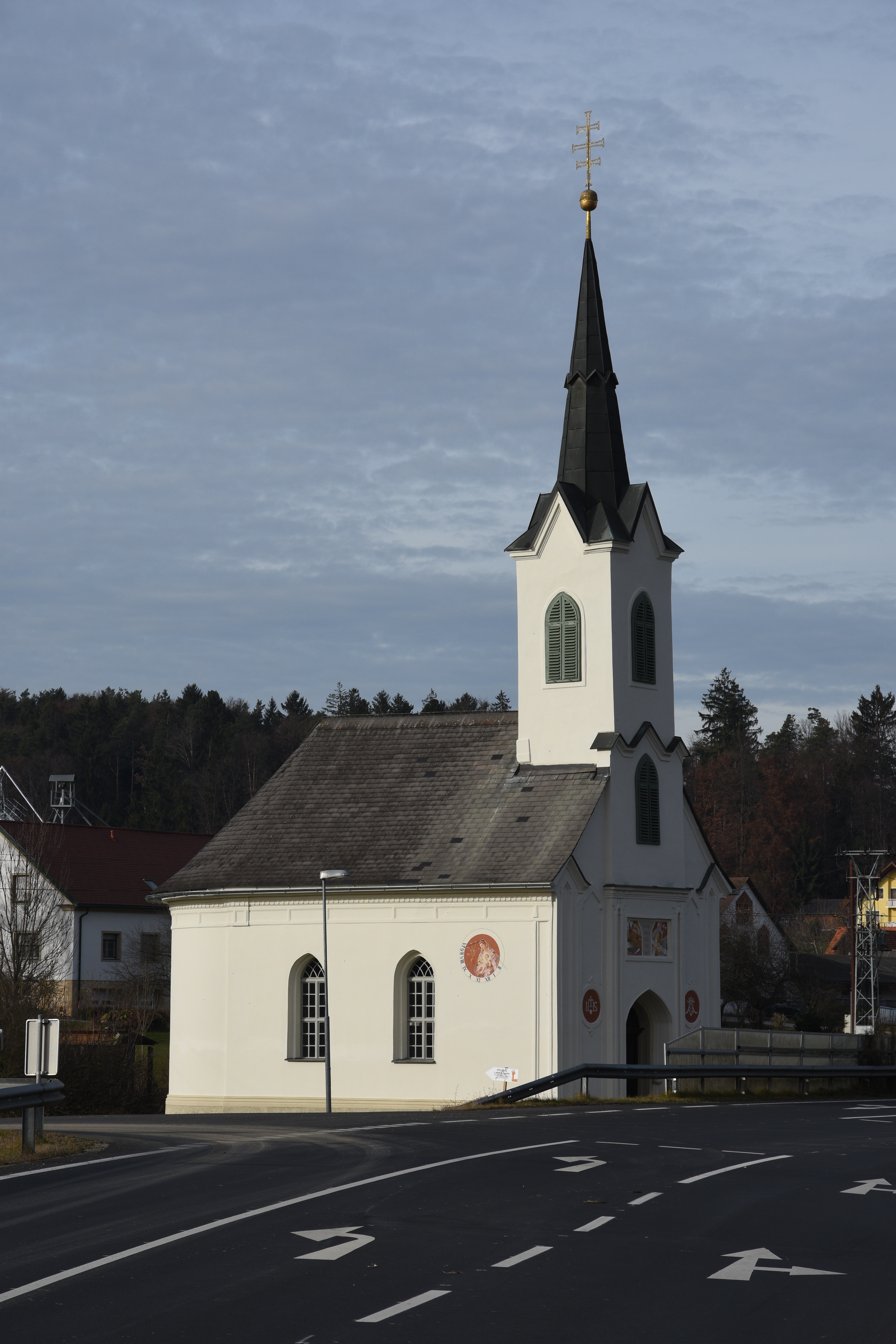
- Chapel in Zerlach

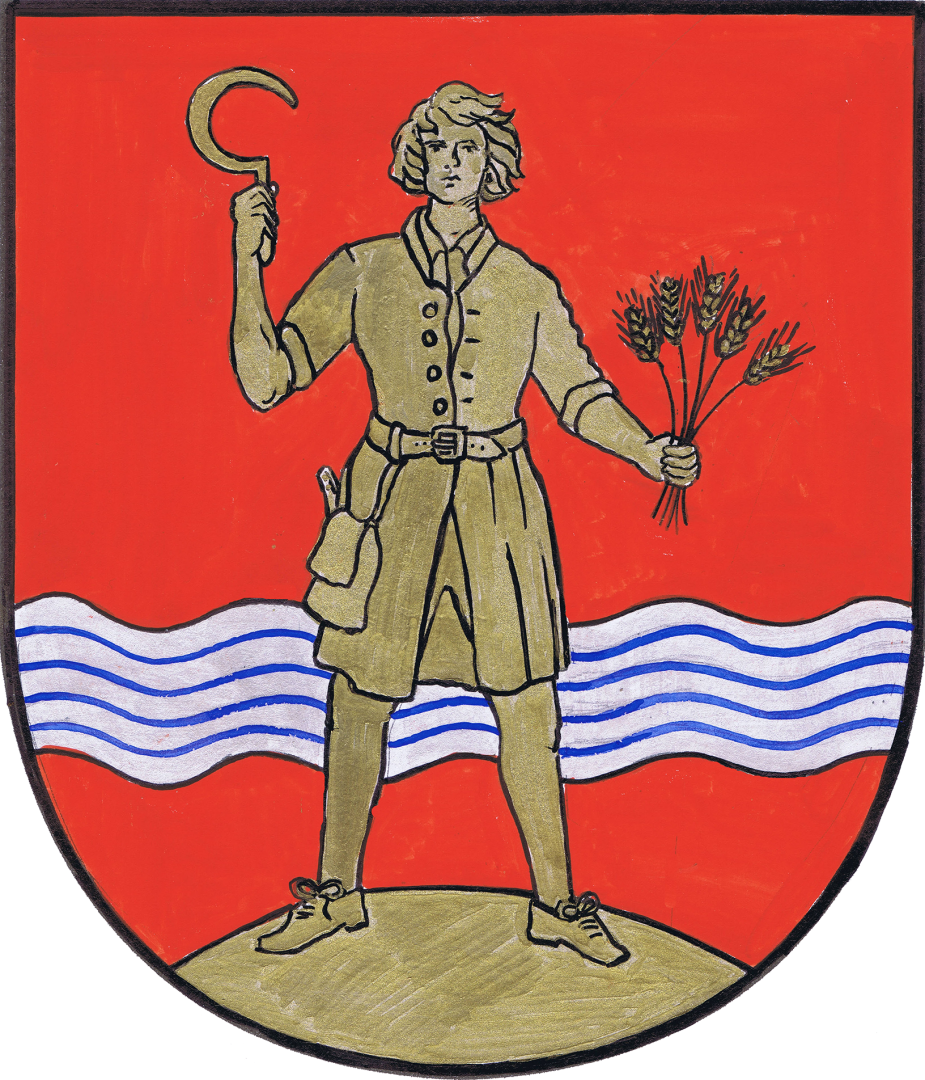
- Coat of arms

- Location within Austria
- Coordinates: 46°56′00″N 15°40′00″E
- Country: Austria
- State: Styria
- District: Südoststeiermark

Government
  - Mayor: Franz Löffler (ÖVP)

Area
  - Total: 39.05 km^{2} (15.08 sq mi)
- Elevation: 334 m (1,096 ft)

Population (2018-01-01)
  - Total: 3,264
  - Density: 83.59/km^{2} (216.5/sq mi)
- Time zone: UTC+1 (CET)
  - Summer (DST): UTC+2 (CEST)
- Postal code: 8082, 8081, 8083
- Area code: 03116
- Website: www.kirchbach.at

Kirchbach-Zerlach is since 2015 a municipality with 3,271 residents (as of 1 January 2016) in the Südoststeiermark District of Styria, Austria. In 2015 the municipality was called Kirchbach in der Steiermark.

The municipality of Kirchbach-Zerlach was formed as part of the Styria municipal structural reform, at the end of 2014, from the former towns of Kirchbach in Steiermark and Zerlach.

After a municipal council agreement, from 1 January 2016, the municipality bears the name "Kirchbach-Zerlach".

== Geography ==
=== Municipalities arrangement ===
The municipality territory includes the following 12 sections (populations as of 1 January 2015) and three cadastral communities (area 2015):

Ortschaften

- Breitenbuch (410)
- Dörfla (458)
- Glatzau (229)
- Kirchbach in Steiermark (853)
- Kittenbach (84)
- Kleinfrannach (180)
- Maierhofen (119)
- Maxendorf (190)
- Tagensdorf (19)
- Weißenbach (160)
- Zerlach (375)
- Ziprein (158)

Katastralgemeinden

- Kirchbach in Steiermark (903.30 ha)
- Zerlach (2,381.82 ha)
- Ziprein (630.10 ha)

=== Demographics ===
The area population has generally increased after 1869, as shown in the bar graph below.

Historical population

| Year | Pop. | ±% |
|---|---|---|
| 1869 | 2,813 | — |
| 1880 | 2,873 | +2.1% |
| 1890 | 2,882 | +0.3% |
| 1900 | 2,840 | −1.5% |
| 1910 | 2,879 | +1.4% |
| 1923 | 2,890 | +0.4% |

| Year | Pop. | ±% |
|---|---|---|
| 1934 | 3,022 | +4.6% |
| 1939 | 2,911 | −3.7% |
| 1951 | 2,997 | +3.0% |
| 1961 | 2,878 | −4.0% |
| 1971 | 3,033 | +5.4% |
| 1981 | 3,047 | +0.5% |

| Year | Pop. | ±% |
|---|---|---|
| 1991 | 3,147 | +3.3% |
| 2001 | 3,395 | +7.9% |
| 2011 | 3,281 | −3.4% |
| 2016 | 3,272 | −0.3% |

Source: Statistik Austria, all data read as of 2016

== Politics ==
=== Mayor ===
The town mayor is Franz Löffler (ÖVP).

Further of the council, the 1st vice-mayor Anton Prödl (ÖVP), the 2nd vice-mayor Karl Süßmaier (Liste "Gemeinsam mehr bewegen"), the town treasurer Thomas Zach (ÖVP), and the board member Josef Luttenberger (ÖVP).

=== Municipal council ===
The town council in 2015 had 21 members (prior 30 = 15 in Kirchbach + 15 in Zerlach) and convened with the following parties:

- 15 ÖVP
- 3 Liste "Gemeinsam mehr bewegen"
- 2 SPÖ
- 1 FPÖ

The last town election had the following results:

| Party | 2015 | | | 2010 | | | | | | 2005 | | | | | | 2000 | | | | | |
| Party | merged municipality | | | Kirchbach | | | Zerlach | | | Kirchbach | | | Zerlach | | | Kirchbach | | | Zerlach | | |
| Party | Stimmen | % | Mandate | St. | % | M. | St. | % | M. | St. | % | M. | St. | % | M. | St. | % | M. | St. | % | M. |
|---|---|---|---|---|---|---|---|---|---|---|---|---|---|---|---|---|---|---|---|---|---|
| ÖVP | 1488 | 66 | 15 | 551 | 53 | 8 | 1056 | 89 | 14 | 529 | 50 | 8 | 1024 | 85 | 13 | 594 | 59 | 10 | 947 | 83 | 13 |
| SPÖ | 196 | 9 | 2 | 197 | 19 | 3 | 137 | 11 | 1 | 166 | 16 | 2 | 186 | 15 | 2 | 65 | 6 | 1 | x | | |
| FPÖ | 166 | 7 | 1 | | | | x | | | 35 | 3 | 0 | x | | | 48 | 5 | 0 | 71 | 6 | 1 |
| Die Grünen | 48 | 2 | 0 | x | | | x | | | x | | | x | | | x | | | x | | |
| Gemeinsam mehr Bewegen | 349 | 16 | 3 | x | | | x | | | x | | | x | | | x | | | x | | |
| United Namelist; Town Kirchbach | x | | | 298 | 28 | 4 | x | | | 337 | 32 | 5 | x | | | x | | | x | | |
| Unabhängige Namensliste | x | | | x | | | x | | | x | | | x | | | x | | | 120 | 12 | 2 |
| Kirchbacher Heimatliste; Walter Patschok | x | | | x | | | x | | | x | | | x | | | x | | | 174 | 17 | 2 |
| Heimatliste Zerlach | x | | | x | | | x | | | x | | | x | | | x | | | 121 | 11 | 1 |
| Votes | 2,260 | | | 1,061 | | | 1,472 | | | 1,077 | | | 1,438 | | | 1,007 | | | 1,307 | | |
| Electoral participation | 81% | | | 81% | | | 82% | | | 82% | | | 85% | | | 82% | | | 88% | | |

x = not candidate
