= Johann Frank Kirchbach =

German painter

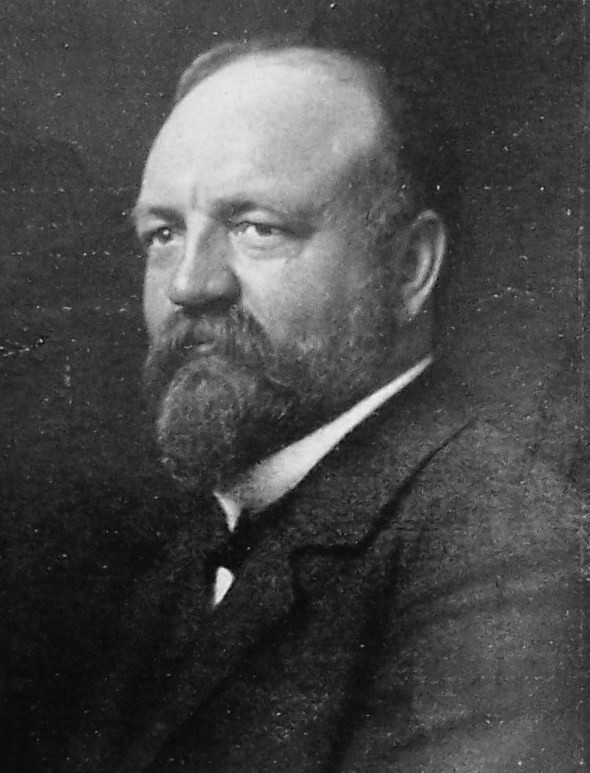
Johann Frank Kirchbach (date unknown)

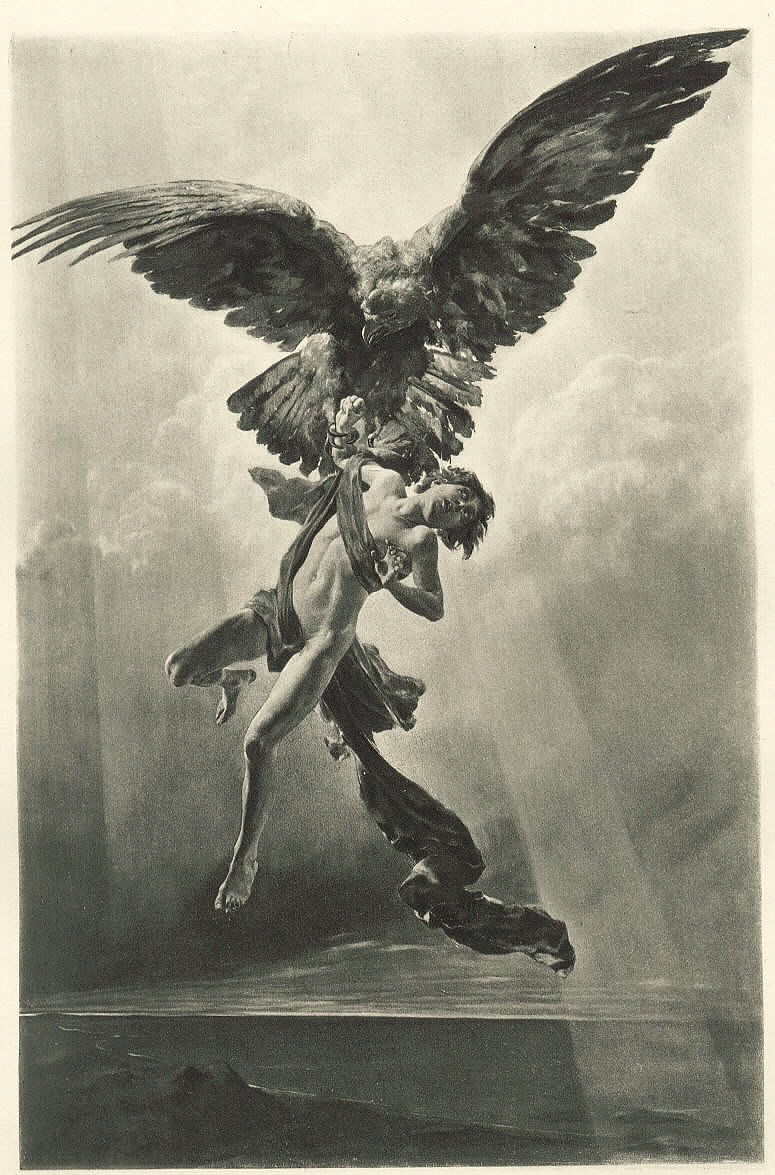
The Abduction of Ganymede; an engraving of Kirchbach's painting, by an unknown artist

Johann Frank Kirchbach (2 June 1859, London – 19 March 1912, Schliersee), was a German historical-, portrait-, genre- and landscape-painter; who also operated as a graphic designer and illustrator.

== Biography ==
His father was the artist, Ernst Kirchbach, who was in exile at the time of his birth. He received his first education at the Dresden Academy (1878) then, as a student of the Munich Academy, exhibited for the first time in 1881, in Munich and Berlin. In 1882, He won first prize for his painting "Duke Christoph the fighter, on the corpse of the last Abensberger" Between 1882 and 1883, he traveled to Italy, France, and England.

When he returned, he took part in the painting of the Schloss Drachenburg near Bonn, with scenes from the Nibelungenlied. The primary image, "The Quarrel of the Queens" was his work.

He then studied in Paris, with Mihály Munkácsy, and created a monumental painting of "Ganymede". Between 1884 and 1886, he was in Munich and created the colossal painting, "Christ Drives the Money Changers Out of the Temple." He was, however, primarily busy with illustrations, such as for the works of Goethe and Paul Heyse, Gulliver's Travels by Jonathan Swift, The Last Days of Pompeii by Edward Bulwer-Lytton, and various youth literature.

In 1889 he was appointed as Head of Department at the Städelschule (Institute of Frankfurt), where he worked seven years before returning to Munich in 1896 as a teacher of life drawing at the Munich Academy. In his last years, he painted mostly portraits.

== Sources ==
- Frank Church Bach . In: Ulrich Thieme and Felix Becker, General Encyclopedia of Artists of the antiquity to the present, Volume 20, EA Seemann, Leipzig, 1927, pg.348
- Hans Ries: Illustrations and illustrators of children's book in German-speaking 1871-1914, Osnabrück 1992, pp. 635 et seq ISBN 3-87898-329-8
