= Fundamental figures of Chilean music =

Fundamental figure of Chilean music, or "Figura fundamental de la música chilena", is an award presented annually by the Sociedad Chilena de Autores e Intérpretes Musicales (SCD), recognizing Chilean artists who have had important influence and legacy in the country's musical history. The selection is made by the organization's board of directors.

Past recipients of the honor are:

- 1987 José Goles
- 1988 Luis Aguirre Pinto
- 1989 Francisco Flores del Campo
- 1990 Vicente Bianchi
- 1991 Donato Román y Ester Soré
- 1992 Valentín Trujillo
- 1993 Margot Loyola
- 1994 Gabriela Pizarro
- 1995 Antonio Prieto
- 1996 Dúo Rey-Silva
- 1997 Los Jaivas
- 1998 Hernán "Nano" Núñez
- 1999 Sonia y Myriam
- 2000 Fernando Rosas
- 2001 Luis Advis
- 2002 Los Ángeles Negros
- 2003 Isabel y Ángel Parra
- 2004 Patricio Manns
- 2005 Lucho Gatica
- 2006 Buddy Richard
- 2007 Silvia Infantas
- 2008 Los Huasos Quincheros
- 2009 Palmenia Pizarro
- 2010 Tito Fernández
- 2011 Cecilia Pantoja
- 2012 Calatambo Albarracín
- 2013 Fernando García
- 2014 Roberto Lecaros
- 2015 Gastón Guzmán
- 2016 Willy Bascuñán
- 2017 Quilapayún
- 2018 Jorge González.
- 2019 Carmen Barros
- 2020 Eduardo Gatti
- 2021: José Alfredo Fuentes
- 2022: Ginette Acevedo and Julio Zegers
- 2023: Myriam Hernández and La Sonora de Tommy Rey

In 2017, as part of the organization's 30th anniversary celebration, the SCD published a book Fundamentales de la Música Chilena reviewing the contributions of each of the honorees.
