= SVR Producciones =

SVR Producciones is a record label of Chilean, Latin American and universal concert music.

== History ==
SVR Producciones was created in August 1987 by the Chilean composer Santiago Vera-Rivera, along with María Angélica Bustamante, with the purpose to registry and divulge concert music pieces from Latin-American composers and interpreters, particularly from Chile, but also from Argentina, Brazil, Cuba, Peru, Mexico, United States and Spain, among others. The label is focused on the works composed on the 20th century, covering electroacoustic, choral, guitar, piano and orchestral music.

Among the composers and interpreters SVR has made known to the public are: Carlos Isamitt (Chile), Manuel Enríquez (Mexico), Adam Waite (USA), Federico Moumpou (Spain), Luis Orlandini (Chile), Armands Ābols (Latvia), Gerardo Salazar (Chile), Jürg Wyttembach (Switzerland), and María Luz Martínez (Chile).

== Chilean composers and interpreters ==
SVR Producciones has been dedicated to rescue the Chilean concert music, registering albums of composers and interpreters of the first generation of Chilean musicians (s. XIX-XX) such as; José Zapiola, Isidora Zegers, Federico Guzmán, Ramón Vinay, Claudio Arrau, Enrique Soro, Alfonso Leng, Pedro Humberto Allende, René Amengual, Víctor Tevah, Domingo Santa Cruz, Juan Amenábar, Alfonso Letelier, Ida Vivado, among others. Also SVR producciones has released the albums of later generations (s. XX-XXI): Fernando García, Carlos Botto, Próspero Bisquertt, Cirilo Vila, Luis Advis, Acario Cotapos, Carlos Isamitt, Juan Orrego-Salas, Carlos Riesco, Miguel Letelier, Jorge Urrutia Blondel, Federico Heilein, Juan Lemann, Violeta Parra. Among the interpreters are Claudia Parada (Chilean soprano), Luis Orlandini (Chilean guitarist), Alfredo Mendieta (Chilean flutist), María Luz Martínez (Chilean singer), Carlos Pérez (Chilean guitarist), Guillermo Lavado (Chilean flutist), Ximena Cabello (Chilean pianist), Cecilia Frigerio (Chilean singer).

== American and European composers and interpreters ==
SVR Producciones has also released works of talented American and European composers like Celso Garrido Lecca (Peru), Alberto Ginastera (Argentina), Carlos Guastavino (Argentina), Heitor Villa-Lobos (Brazil), Cláudio Santoro (Brazil), Camargo Guarnieri (Brazil), Leo Brouwer (Cuba), Manuel Enríquez (Mexico), George Gershwin (USA), Leopold Weiss (Germany), J. S. Bach (Germany), Joaquín Rodrigo (Spain), Alfonso X (Spain), Joaquín Turina (Spain), Francisco Tárrega (Spain), Alfred Kalnins (Latvia), Claude Debussy (France), Maurice Ravel (France), Frank Martin (Switzerland). Between the interpreters we can mention to David del Pino Klinge ( Peruvian director), Armands Ābols (Latvian pianist), Quartet de Bec Frullato (Barcelona), Orchestra of Chamber of Norway, Jürg Wyttenbach (Swiss director), Per Skoglund (Swedish pianist).

== Award ==
In 2006, SVR Producciones received the Chilean award Prize of the Critic, "For his permanent work of diffusion of the works of composers and interpreters of the concert music ".

In 2009, SVR Producciones received the Chilean award Prize of the President of Republic 2009, in the category Phonographic Production. Premio Presidencia 2009 (in Spanish) More information

== See also ==
- Lists of record labels
