= Huasita Regalona =

Song by Ester Soré
- Released: 1959
- Genre: Chilean folk
- Label: RCA Victor
- Songwriter(s): Donato Román

Huasita Regalona is a song written by Chilean songwriter Donato Román. It was first recorded by Chilean singer Ester Soré who also issued an album in 1959 under the same name. Another popular version of the song was recorded by Silvia Infantas.

== Composition ==
Román. was honored with an award for the composition at the Viña del Mar International Song Festival.

== Recordings ==
The song was recorded in the 1950s by Ester Soré. The song was the title track of Soré's 1959 album released by RCA Victor. On the version of the song included on the album, Soré was accompanied by Los Sembradores. In 1991, Román and Soré were jointly recognized as fundamental figures of Chilean music. Soré's version of the song has enjoyed enduring popularity and was re-issued in digital format as a single on Amazon Music, and as part of a compilation of Soré's greatest hits on Apple Music and Spotify.

The song has also been covered by other artists, including Silvia Infantas (also a fundamental figure of Chilean music), and, more recently, by Fernanda Martinez.
