= Caliche (disambiguation) =

Caliche is a hardened deposit of calcium carbonate.

Caliche may also refer to:

- Caliche, a dialect of Salvadoran Spanish
- Caliche, a musical composition by Calatambo Albarracín
- Caliche, a fictional character in Columbian TV drama Apocalipsur
