= Pedro Messone =

Chilean singer (1934–2023)

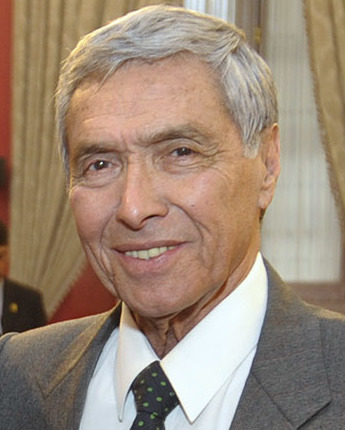
- Messone in 2012
- Born: Pedro Aquiles Messone Rivas; 6 June 1934; Temuco, Chile
- Died: 1 June 2023 (aged 88); Santiago, Chile
- Occupation(s): Singer; Actor

Pedro Aquiles Messone Rivas (6 June 1934 – 1 June 2023) was a Chilean folk singer and actor, whose career spanned almost 60 years.

== Life and career ==
Born in Temuco, the son of a company manager, Messone grew up in Valparaíso. While a student at the Seminario San Rafael, he became friends with Luis Urquidi, with whom he co-founded the neo-folk ensemble Los Cuatro Cuartos. Moving to Santiago, he made his acting debut in an amateur dramatic company, before making his major professional debut in the drama La pérgola de las flores with the Teatro Ensayo de la Universidad Católica. In 1964, torn between his commitments as an actor and musician, he left his group and started a short-lived ensemble, Los de Las Condes, which had a major hit with "El corralero".

In 1966, Messone started his solo career with the album El solitario, which was a massive success thanks to the eponymous song, as well as the hits "Pa' mar adentro", "El ovejero" and "El cigarrito". He took part in several editions of the Viña del Mar International Song Festival. His last hit was "La tejedora" (1982).

A supporter of Augusto Pinochet, Messone campaigned for the Yes at the 1988 Chilean national plebiscite. In 1992, he ran for mayor of Buin with the Independent Democratic Union party, without being elected.

In 2018, Messone received the Premio a la Música Nacional Presidente de la República for his career. Messone died on 1 June 2023, at the age of 88.

== Discography ==
- El solitario, 1966
- Pedro Messone con Los Paulos, 1966
- La fonda de ño Pedro, 1967
- Gracias, 1967
- Si vas para Chile, y otras canciones tradicionales, 1969
- Chile romántico y tradicional, 1969
- Voy por la vida cantando, 1969
- Éxitos de oro, 1971
- Grandes intérpretes del Neofolklore, 1999
- Las grandes canciones chilenas del siglo XX, 1999
- El huaso que yo conozco, 2001
- Las 100 mejores canciones chilenas de todos los tiempos, 2004
- Éxitos de siempre, 2006
- Con Los Paulos. Los mejores éxitos, 2007
