= Sonia y Myriam =

Chilean singer duo active in the 1940s to 1960s

- Sonia y Myriam album cover

Background information
- Origin: Chile
- Occupation: Singers
- Years active: 1941-1950, 1957-1964

Sonia y Miriam was a Chilean singing duo of sisters Myriam Ester von Schrebler García (May 22, 1930, Valparaíso, Chile - December 23, 2006, Madrid, Spain) and Sonia von Schrebler García (April 9, 1929, Santiago, Chile - September 14, 2018).

The sisters grew up on Cerro Playa Ancha in Valparaíso. Their mother was a singer known by the stage name Cora Santa Cruz (1907 - 2005) . The sisters began performing professionally as children in 1941, appearing on Radio Carrera where their mother worked. They became regulars on Chilean radio. In 1942, at age 12, they released their first record, "La cancion del carretero" and "Linda chilena", on the RCA Victor label. They also sang "La cancion del carretero" in the 1942 motion picture, El ultimo dia del invierno. In 1944, at ages 14 and 15, they traveled to Argentina where they performed on radio and in a theatre company and met the future Eva Peron. They returned to Chile in 1945 and appeared in the first Chilean musical film, Música en tu corazón (1945). In this period, they had two of their biggest hits, "Una pena y un cariño" and "Ay, ay, ay". In the late 1940s, they worked and performed in Brazil.

In 1950, Sonia married and stopped performing. Myriam joined the Llanquiray Trio with Vicente Bianchi. The sisters reunited as a musical act from 1957 to 1964. During this period, they performed extensively in Chile, Cuba, Peru, Argentina, Mexico, and the United States. They also had hits with the songs, "Adiós" and "Envidia". Myriam resigned from the group in 1964, and Sonia undertook a solo career under the name "Sonia La Única".

In 2001, they were honored with the designation as fundamental figures of Chilean music.
