= Fernando Rosas Pfingsthorn =

- Born: August 7, 1931; Valparaíso, Chile
- Died: October 5, 2007 (aged 76) Santiago, Chile
- Genres: Contemporary classical, orchestral
- Occupations: Conductor, composer
- Years active: 1953–2007

Fernando Rosas Pfingsthorn (Valparaíso, August 7, 1931 – Santiago, October 5, 2007) was a Chilean orchestra conductor and one of the founders of the Youth and Children's Orchestras Foundation of Chile.

== Academics ==
Fernando Rosas completed studies in law and social sciences in the Catholic University of Valparaíso in 1953. While he was there, he pushed for the creation of the university's arts and music institute.

He studied and completed his musical education in Musikhochschule Detmold, Germany, with a scholarship provided by the German Academic Exchange Service.

He also completed a bachelor's degree in Musical Interpretation at the Catholic University of Chile.

He won a scholarship on the Fulbright Program to Juilliard School, where he studied between 1968 and 1970.

== Life and work ==
Fernando Rosas married twice and had six children: Felipe, Magdalena, Bernardita, Jimena, Fernando and Ana Maria.

In 1960, he founded the music department of the Catholic University of Valparaíso.

In 1964, he was made director of the music department at the Catholic University of Chile, where he founded its Chamber Orchestra and Music School. He remained as director of the orchestra for 12 years, performing concerts, recording several albums, and on many occasions taking part in TV shows. He took the first Chilean orchestra on tour through Europe, and performed in the USA and the other countries of America with the same orchestra.

In 1976 he created the “Fundación Beethoven” (Beethoven foundation), with Adolfo Flores, and was its president from 1989 until his death in 2007. One of the achievements of this foundation was the creation of Radio Beethoven, one of the radio stations in Chile dedicated to classical music. The same year, he organized the first edition of the "Temporada Internacional de Conciertos del Teatro Oriente" (Teatro Oriente International Season of Concerts) in Santiago. This festival featured some of the greatest international performers and soloists in classical music.

In 1982, Rosas became director of the Chilean Education Ministry Orchestra, known today as Chilean Chamber Orchestra. or "Orquesta de Cámara de Chile" With this orchestra he toured throughout Chile, Europe and America several times, taking part in international festivals.

== Death ==
He died on Friday October 5, 2007.

=== Youth and Children's Orchestras Foundation of Chile ===
In 1991, Fernando Rosas received a special invitation from the Venezuelan Minister of Culture, José Antonio Abreu, to meet the country's Youth Orchestras. As a result of this experience, the Beethoven Foundation (directed by him) and Chilean Education Ministry launched a program to create and support youth orchestras in Chile in 1992. The program worked with the help of instructors that travelled to Antofagasta, Copiapó, La Serena, Talca, Chillán, Valdivia and Temuco (the cities covered by the program) teaching orchestra members and encouraging other young people to join.

As part of this program, he created the National Youth Symphony Orchestra in 1994, a group of 100 young adults and teenagers between the ages of 14 and 25, selected in a public competition. Rosas would be its chief conductor until late 2001, performing throughout Chile. In May 2001, he proposed and helped create the "Fundación Nacional de Orquestas Juveniles" or Youth and Children's Orchestras Foundation of Chile, along with Luisa Durán, and became its executive director.

== Awards ==
Fernando Rosas Pfingsthorn received many awards throughout his career, including:

- Premio Annual de la Crítica Chilena (Annual Chilean Critics Award)
- Medalla de Oro de la Municipalidad de Providencia (Municipality of Providencia Gold Medal)
- Medalla de la ciudad de Frankfurt (Frankfurt Medal)
- Medalla al Director Cultural más Destacado otorgada por Amigos del Arte (Friends of Art Medal for Best Cultural Director).
- Cruz de Plata de la República de Austria (Austria Silver Cross)
- Premio “Figura Fundamental de la Música Chilena” (SCD Leading Figure in Chilean Music).
- Condecoración “Andrés Bello” otorgada por el Presidente Rafael Caldera, por la labor desarrollada en el ámbito cultural, con ocasión de su visita a Venezuela junto a la Orquesta Nacional Juvenil. (Distinction awarded by Venezuelan President Rafael Caldera, for work in the cultural field during his visit to Venezuela with the National Youth Orchestra.
- Premio a la Música Presidente de la República(Presidential Prize for Music, 2002)
- Premio "Domingo Santa Cruz" de la Academia de Bellas Artes del Instituto de Chile (Domingo Santa Cruz Prize from the Fine Arts Academy, 2003)
- Orden al Mérito Gabriela Mistral en grado de Gran Oficial (Gabriela Mistral Order of Merit, Grand Officer, 2004)
- Premio TVN a la trayectoria (TVN Lifetime Achievement Award, 2005)
- Premio APES por aporte a la formación y desarrollo de orquestas juveniles (APES Award for contribution to the training and development of youth orchestras, 2005).
- National Prize for Musical Arts of Chile, in recognition for his constant efforts to promote classical music among young people (2006)
- Medalla Héroe de la Paz San Alberto Hurtado, otorgada por la Universidad Alberto Hurtado, (Saint Alberto Hurtado Peace Medal, August 30, 2007).

== See also ==
- Music of Chile
- Youth and Children's Orchestras Foundation of Chile
