= Silvia Infantas =

Chilean singer and actress (1923–2024)

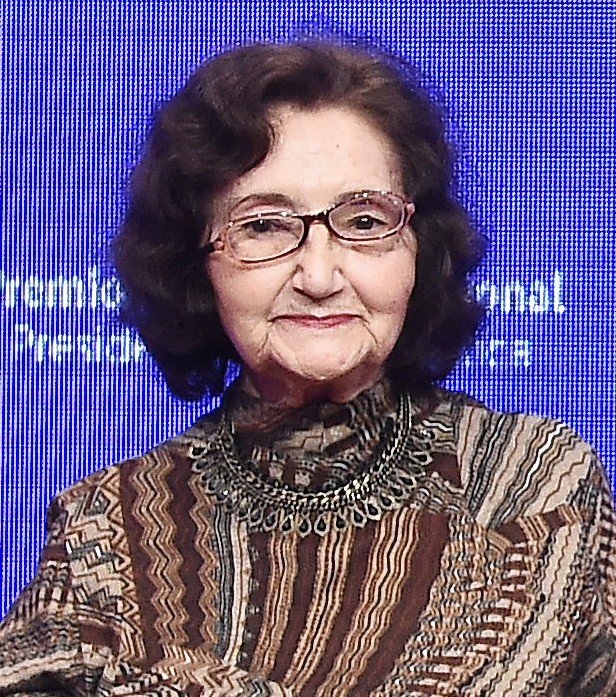
- Infantas in 2016

Background information
- Born: Sylvia Elvira Infantas Soto; 14 June 1923; Santiago, Chile
- Died: 19 June 2024 (aged 101) Santiago, Chile
- Genres: Folk, tonada
- Occupation(s): Singer, actress, folklorist
- Years active: 1942–2024

Sylvia Elvira Infantas Soto (14 June 1923 – 19 June 2024) was a Chilean singer, actress, and folklorist.

== Early years ==
Infantas was born in Santiago in 1923. She was the daughter of Tenor and Jorge Infantas, and grew up in the El Almendral neighborhood of Valparaíso.

== Singing career ==
She began her singing career in 1942, performing on various radio stations. She was chosen as the best "melodic singer" of 1943 by Radiomanía magazine and eventually became recognised for her performances of Chilean folk music leading the groups "Silvia Infantas y los Baqueanos" (1953–1959) and "Silvia Infantas y los Cóndores" (1960–1969). In 1962, she participated in the third annual Viña del Mar International Song Festival; her performance of "El loro aguafiestas" (with backing from Los Cóndores) won the first place in the competition.

Infantas was a central figure in Chilean folk music from 1942 to 1970. She made international tours of Argentina, Uruguay, Peru, Ecuador, Colombia, Venezuela, West Germany and Panama. She also made tours in Los Baqueanos between 1953 and 1959 and Los Cóndores between 1960 and 1969.

In 1955, composer Vicente Bianchi presented his musical interpretation on Pablo Neruda's poems "Tonadas de Manuel Rodríguez", "Canto a Bernardo O'Higgins" and "Romance de los Carreras". These works were recorded and popularized by Infantas and Los Baqueanos. Their recording of Música para la Historia de Chile has been recognized as an outstanding contribution to the culture of Chile.

== Acting career ==
Infantas also developed a career as an actress at the Teatro de Ensayo de la Universidad Católica (TEUC) between 1946 and 1952 acting in plays such as El gran farante, El tiempo y los Conway, Contigo en la soledad, El cid, El burlador de Sevilla, Invitación al castillo, Pygmalion, El senador más honorable, La pérgola de las flores, and La anunciación a María. For the latter, she won the Caupolicán Award for "best actress" in 1950. She also acted in the 1968 film Ayúdeme usted compadre.

== Death ==
Infantas turned 100 in 2023, and died in Santiago, on 19 June 2024, at the age of 101.

== Awards and honors ==
In 2009 she was named "Figura Fundamental de la Música Chilena" by the "Sociedad Chilena del Derecho de Autor" (SCD). In 2015, she was awarded the President of the Republic National Music Award in the category "Folk Music". She received the award from President Michelle Bachelet at age 92 in an official ceremony at the La Moneda Palace.

In March 2019, in the context of the commemoration of Women's History Month, a biography titled "Silvia Infantas, voz y melodía de Chile" was published; it was written by music journalist David Ponce.

== Discography ==
=== Silvia Infantas y los Baqueanos ===
- Música para la historia de Chile (1955)
- Tonadas de Manuel Rodríguez (1955)
- Romance de los Carrera (1955)
- Canto a Bernardo O'Higgins (1956)
- La Independencia de Chile (1955)
- Chile compañero
- A la mar, marinero
- Yo vengo de San Rosendo
- La refalaita
- Sólo al mar
- Patitos en la laguna
- Carretita Chancha
- Consejos por casamiento
- Tristeza India
- Eternamente
- Huaso
- Canción del brindis
- Huaso ladino
- Vamos, corazón
- Feliz cumpleaños
- Somos los buenos muchachos
- La barquilla del amor
- Eternamente
- Pinceladas del pago
- La pena de mi canto
- Los lagos de Chile
- Al pie de una guitarra
- La rosa y el clavel
- Arriba las palmas
- Echándole el pelo
- La amasandera de Quilipín
- La chiquilla que baila
- Entre mate y mate
- Aradito de palo
- Allá va mi huaso
- Caldito de ave
- ¡Viva la Cueca!
- La blanca azucena
- Ramoncito, el camarón
- Ja Jai qué linda la Cueca
- Yo conocí a una a una morena
- Ilusión campesina
- El marinero
- Así es mi tonada
- La Cueca del gorila
- Aló aló
- Hermanos Lagos
- Corazones partidos
- El canario
- Los finaos
- La batelera
- El casamiento

=== Silvia Infantas y los Cóndores ===
- Bajando pa' Puerto Aysén (1964)
- Rosita de Cachapoal (1964)
- Cuando baila mi morena. La cueca: su origen, su música, sus estilos (1965)
- ¡Con permiso...! Soy la cueca (1968)
- Huaso pintiao (196x)
- Cantarito de Greda
- Si vas para Chile
- La consentida
- Racimito de uva negra
- En Chillán planté una rosa
- Camino de luna
- Fiesta del campo
- Mis recuerdos
- La Juana Rosa
- Apología de la cueca
- Campanilla de plata
- La palomita
- La rosa blanca
- Los dichos chilenos
- Tonadas para la Patria
- Huasita Regalona
- Mi guitarra
- Campito de mi tierra
- Zorzalito
- La gitana
- Porqué se fue
- Tierra chilena
- Tiro y tiro y el huaso firme
- Los lagos de Chile
- Mi casa de campo
- Échame el lazo (1964)

=== Solo artist ===
- Héroes y tradiciones (1999)
