= Santiago Vera-Rivera =

Chilean composer and teacher

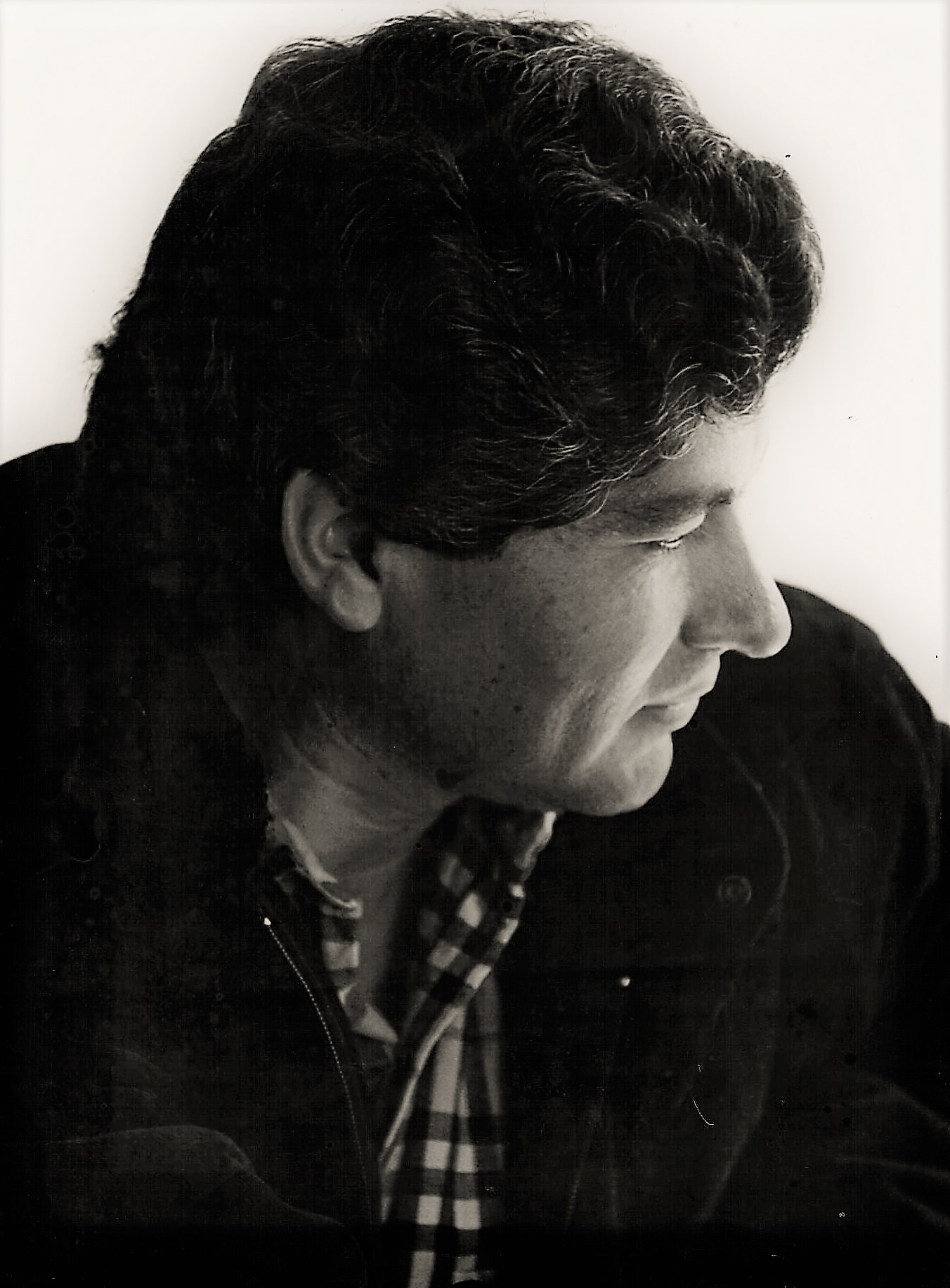
Santiago Vera-Rivera

Santiago Vera-Rivera (born November 2, 1950) (also known as Santiago Vera Rivera, without hyphen) is a Chilean composer, teacher and musical researcher.

== Education ==
Vera-Rivera began his studies in composition at the Arts Faculty of the Universidad de Chile, under composers Carlos Botto, Alfonso Letelier, Juan Amenábar, Juan Lemann and Cirilo Vila.

== Career ==
He has taught at all educational levels in Chile and gave courses in Ecuador, Bolivia, Colombia and Spain. At the present time he is a permanent teacher and Director of the Departamento de Educación Musical at the Universidad Metropolitana de Ciencias de la Educación (UMCE), the Universidad de Chile and the Instituto Interamericano de Educación Musical (Inter-American Music Education Institute), a Chile-based organism of the Organization of American States (OAS).

== Academic posts ==
Vera-Rivera was a founding member of prestigious authors and academic institutions, some of which he represented in Argentina, Brazil, Spain, Italy, Sweden, France and England. In 1987, he was elected President of the Asociación Nacional de Compositores de Chile (ANC). On May 25, 1998, he was nominated as full member and for period 2000-06 Executive Secretary of the Academia Chilena de Bellas Artes of the Instituto de Chile, at present holding the post of President for period 2007–10.

== Works ==
He has written more than 80 works for different genres, including the contemporary pieces Apocalíptika II for string orchestra and piano, Apocalíptika III (1991) for orchestra and choir, and Silogístika I (1989), for flute and acoustic guitar, "Glípticas" for string quartet (1999). "Refocilaciones" (2007), for guitar will be released World Premiere in London in the month of July by the prestigious Chilean guitarist Luis Orlandini.

He was the founder and director of SVR Producciones, a recording label created in 1987 to publish Chilean and Latin American concert and folk music from the 20th century. His repertoire includes more than 70 musical works for almost all genres. Several of them have received national and international awards. Most of his work has been edited and performed in Chile, United States, Europe and Oceania.

In 1987, he composed the first Mass for choir, soloists, traditional instruments and orchestra in Honor of Pope John Paul II. In 1989, his "Apocalíptika II" for string orchestra and piano was selected by an international jury among 589 musical compositions from all over the world for the World Music Days Oslo-90; its premiere took place in Oslo (Norway) in September 1990. By the end of 1993, his "Silogístika II" for voice (alto), clarinet, violin, violoncello and piano obtained the highest score in it category in the sixth edition of the contemporary Latin American music festival Trimalca (Tribuna Musical de América Latina y el Caribe) that took place in Mar del Plata (Argentina).

== Notable awards and recognitions ==
In 1996, he obtained the first prize in the competition of the National Federation of Chilean Choirs for the harmonization of the song "Arranca, Arranca", by Violeta Parra. His harmonization of another song by Violeta Parra, "Gracias a la Vida", was performed for the first official visit of a President of Finland to Chile on March 5, 1997 at the Municipal Theater of Santiago by the Finnish artists Johanna Rusanen (soprano) and Ilkka Paananen (piano). In 1998, Santiago Vera-Rivera composed "Sonata al Jazz", dedicated to Walter "Pee Wee" Hunt.

In recognition for his production and distribution of Chilean and Latin American classical music (música docta), Vera-Rivera was awarded in 2004 with the Prize of the Consejo Chileno de la Música (Chilean Council of Music), affiliated to the International Music Council of the Unesco. The year 2006 SVR Producciones received the Prize of the Critic by "Their permanent work of diffusion of works of composers and interpreters of learned music".

In 2009, Santiago Vera-Rivera, director of SVR Producciones, received the Chilean award Prize of the President of Republic 2009, in the category Phonographic Production.
