= Letelier =

Letelier is a surname. Notable people with the surname include:

- Carmen Luisa Letelier, Chilean singer and teacher
- Fabiola Letelier (born 1929), Chilean lawyer
- Hernán Rivera Letelier (born 1950), Chilean novelist
- José Letelier (born 1966), Chilean football coach and goalkeeper
- Juan Carlos Letelier (born 1959), Chilean football striker
- Patricio Letelier (1943–2011), Chilean mathematical physicist
- Orlando Letelier (1932–1976), Chilean economist, politician and diplomat
- René Letelier (1915–2006), Chilean chess player
