= Gerd Zacher =

German composer, organist and music writer

Gerd Zacher (6 July 1929 – 9 June 2014) was a German composer, organist, and writer on music. He specialized in contemporary compositions, many of which feature extended techniques, and are written in graphic or verbal scores. He interpreted the scores of numerous contemporary composers, including John Cage, Juan Allende-Blin, Mauricio Kagel, György Ligeti, Hans Otte, Luis de Pablo, and Isang Yun. He was also known as an interpreter of the works of Johann Sebastian Bach.

Zacher was born in Meppen and lived in Essen, Germany.

== Writings ==
=== On music ===
- Analyse der Orgel – ein Interpretationskurs. In: Internationale Ferienkurse für neue Musik. 26. 1972. – Mainz [u.a.] : Schott, 1973. (Darmstädter Beiträge zur neuen Musik; 13)
- Bach gegen seine Interpreten verteidigt : Aufsätze 1987–1992. München : Edition Text u. Kritik, 1993. – 170 pages – (Musik-Konzepte; 79/80)
- Beobachtungen an Erik Saties «Messe des pauvres». In: Erik Satie. – 2., erw. Aufl. – München : Edition Text u. Kritik, 1988. – pp. 48–63. – (Musik-Konzepte; 11)
- Canonische Veränderungen, BWV 769 und 769 a. In: Bach Johann Sebastian – Das spekulative Spätwerk. – 2., unveränd. Aufl. – München : Edition Text u. Kritik, 1999. – pp. 3–19. – (Musik-Konzepte; 17/18)
- Der geheime Text des Contrapunctus IV von Bach (Anregungen der Sprache für die Ausprägung von Musik). In: Stefan Klöckner (Hrsg.): Godehard Joppich zum 60. Geburtstag, Bosse, Regensburg 1992, pp. 219–237
- Die Erfahrung der Abwesenheit Gottes in der Musik des 20. Jahrhunderts. In: Wolfhart Pannenberg (Hrsg.): Die Erfahrung der Abwesenheit Gottes in der modernen Kultur, Vandenhoek & Ruprecht, Göttingen 1984, pp. 137–159
- Die Kunst einer Fuge. Als Begleitheft zur Wergo-CD 6184-2, 1990
- Die riskanten Beziehungen zwischen Sonate und Kirchenlied : Mendelssohns Orgelsonaten op. 65 Nr. 1 und 6 .In: Felix Mendelssohn Bartholdy. – München : Edition Text u. Kritik, 1980. – pp. 34–45. – (Musik-Konzepte; 14/15)
- Eine Fuge ist eine Fuge ist eine Fuge (Liszts B-A-C-H-Komposition für Orgel). In: Musik und Kirche 47, 1977, H. 1, pp. 15–23
- Erfahrungen bei der Interpretation graphisch notierter Orgelmusik. In: Rundbrief des Landeskirchenmusikdirektors der Evang. Luth. Landeskirche Schleswig-Holstein, December 1966, pp. 8f.
- Frescobaldi und die instrumentale Redekunst. In: Musik und Kirche 45, 1975, H. 2, pp. 54–64
- "«Ich kenne des Menschen nicht» : ein musikwissenschaftliches Dilemma (Zu Bachs Kunst der Fuge, Contrapunctus XI)". In. Musik und Kirche. vol. 56. 1986. 6. pp. 298–299
- Komponierte Formanten .In: Aimez-vous Brahms 'the Progressive'?. – München : Edition Text u. Kritik, 1989. – pp. 69–75. – (Musik-Konzepte; 65)
- Livre d'orgue – eine Zumutung. In: Olivier Messiaen. – München : Edition Text u. Kritik, 1982. – pp. 92–107. – (Musik-Konzepte; 28)
- Materialsammlung zu Dieter Schnebels Choralvorspielen. In: Dieter Schnebel. – München : Edition Text u. Kritik, 1980. – pp. 12–22. – (Musik-Konzepte, 16)
- Max Reger. Zum Orgelwerk. In: Musik-Konzepte Nr. 115, 2002
- Meine Erfahrungen mit der «Improvisation ajoutée». In: Kagel, 1991. Hrsg. von Werner Klüppelholz. – Köln : DuMont, 1991. – pp. 136–154
- Orgelmusik vor 20, 30 Jahren, als unsere Gegenwart noch Zukunft war. In: Acta Organologica, Bd. 17, Berlin 1984, pp. 406–415
- Randbemerkungen über das Zählen in Schönbergs «Ein Überlebender aus Warschau».In: Arnold Schönberg. – München : Edition Text u. Kritik, 1980. – pp. 146–150. – (Musik-Konzepte; Sonderband)
- Schöpferische Tradition statt Historismus. In: Acta Organologica, Bd. 17, Berlin 1984, pp. 184–207
- Über eine vergessene Tradition des Legatospiels. In: Musik und Kirche 43,, 1973, H. 4, pp. 166–171
- Werkzeug Orgel. In: Der Kirchenmusiker 19, 1968, H. 5, pp. 1–4
- Zu Anton Weberns Bachverständnis. In: Anton Webern I. – München : Edition Text u. Kritik, 1983. – pp. 290–305. – (Musik-Konzepte; Sonderband)

=== Translations from the Spanish language ===
- Pablo de Rokha: Der große Kummer (Übersetzung: Gerd Zacher u. Juan Allende-Blin). In: Alternative Zeitschrift für Dichtung und Diskussion, 1961, H. 21, S.133 – 135
- Pablo Neruda: Es gibt keine Vergessenheit (Sonate), Vicente Huidobro: Allein, Óscar Castro: Engel und Papierdrachen Übersetzung: Gerd Zacher u. Juan Allende-Blin). In Gotthard Speer/Hansjürgen Winterhoff (Hrsg.): Meilensteine eines Komponistenlebens. Kleine Festschrift zum 70. Geburtstag von Günter Bialas. Bärenreiter, Kassel 1977, pp. 16f.

== Compositions ==
- 1954: Fünf Transformationen für Klavier, op. 3
- 1960: Magnificat für zweistimmigen Chor, Bläser (oder Orgel) und Pauken, Edition Häusler, Stuttgart
- 1961: Differencias für Orgel, Ed. Peters, Leipzig
- 1968: Szmaty (Palm 22,19) für Orgel. Isang Yun gewidmet (unveröffentlicht)
- 1968: 700000 Tage später (eine Lukaspassion) für gemischten Chor (12 bis 28 Mitwirkende)(unveröffentlicht).
- 1968/69: "Die Kunst einer Fuge" d.i. Bachs Contrapunctus I in 10 Interpretationen für Orgel (CD: Wergo, 1996)
- 1987: 75 event(ualitie)s für Orgel und Tonband. Zum 75. Geburtstag von John Cage (unveröffentlicht)
- 1993: Trapez (in memoriam Hans Henny Jahnn) für Orgel (unveröffentlicht)
- L'heure qu'il est für zwei Klaviere im Vierteltonabstand (unveröffentlicht)
