= Isidora Aguirre =

Chilean writer (1919–2011)

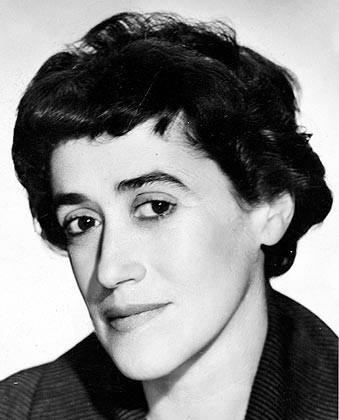
- Born: Isidora Aguirre Tupper; 22 March 1919; Santiago, Chile
- Died: 25 February 2011 (aged 91); Santiago, Chile
- Resting place: Parque del Recuerdo, Santiago
- Other names: Nené Aguirre
- Occupation: Playwright
- Notable work: La pérgola de las flores
- Spouses: Gerardo Carmona; Peter Sinclaire
- Awards: Santiago Municipal Literature Award (1964, 1971); Casa de las Américas Prize (1987); Pablo Neruda Order of Artistic and Cultural Merit (2005)
- Website: www.isidoraaguirre.com

Isidora Aguirre Tupper (22 March 1919 – 25 February 2011) was a Chilean writer, an author mainly of dramatic works on social issues that have been performed in many countries in the Americas and Europe. Her best known work is La pérgola de las flores, which, constituted "one of the milestones in the history of Chilean theater in the second half of the 20th century."

== Biography ==
The daughter of Fernando Aguirre Errázuriz and the painter María Tupper Huneeus (1893–1965), Isidora Aguirre was a student at the Joan of Arc School in Santiago and later studied social work, literature, piano, modern ballet, and drawing from 1937 to 1939.

When she was 21, in 1940, Nené (as she was called) married Gerardo Carmona, a refugee from the Spanish Civil War. She lived in the countryside for five years, and later went with him to Paris, where she began to earn a living as an illustrator, while continuing to study theater and cinema.

Back in Chile, "a chance encounter with the actor and theater director Hugo Miller on a trolleybus was decisive in defining her vocation and devoting herself completely to dramaturgy." Thus, in 1952 Aguirre enrolled in a drama course, dictated by him at the Chilean Academy of the Ministry of Education. "From then on, her dedication to theatrical activity would lead her, on many occasions, to put aside her personal life, even."

On her complete dedication to the theater, she said "One always has to choose. It is not possible to be married and to write as I do. La pérgola cost me tears. I had to spend whole days in the library looking for historical data, although I was expecting my youngest daughter and I would have liked to knit little coats. But the theater chose me. For Los papeleros, I spent months chatting with those who rummage through garbage cans. And Lautaro meant going, on horseback, to indigenous strongholds and living there. What husband supports that?"

Before devoting herself to the theater, she had begun to write children's stories – in 1938 she published a compilation of eight of them. She also published a novel for children in 1948. Isidora Aguirre recalled her first literary essays: "I think it was at the age of six that I wrote a story that we later bound. It was called Los anteojos de Pepito and it was three pages with very large print. I did not write stories again until I was fifteen, when Marta Brunet, my mother's friend, entrusted me with the children's page of the magazine Familia."

Like many Chilean playwrights during the 1950s and 1960s, her career began under the aegis of university theaters, institutions that, since the 1940s, generated a qualitative as well as a quantitative change in Chilean theatrical activity. With the foundation of the Experimental Theater of University of Chile in 1941, and the Trial Theater of Catholic University in 1943, a professional theater practice characterized by a greater artistic and technical rigor than the commercial theater began to develop. This in turn fostered both the production of plays and the creation of new theatrical groups, and an audience for that type of theater in the country.

In 1955 she premiered her first comedies, Carolina and La dama del canasto, but very soon she dedicated herself to "committed theater", a genre to which a large part of her production belongs. To effect social protest, she experimented with various theatrical styles: comedy, musical comedy, farce, historical works, testimonial works, and popular theater. In 1959, she premiered her first tragedy, Población Esperanza, of marked social content and written in conjunction with the novelist Manuel Rojas. The following year, she made the leap to fame with La pérgola de las flores, a play which has been produced innumerable times and was made into a film of the same name by the Uruguayan-Argentine director Román Viñoly Barreto in 1965.

Isidora Aguirre also wrote novels for adults. The first, Doy por vivido todo lo soñado, published in 1987, is the fictionalized story of her mother. The second, Carta a Roque Dalton (1990), is dedicated to the Salvadoran writer and the love she shared with him in 1969, when she was a member of the Casa de las Américas Prize jury, which Dalton won with his poetry collection Taberna y otros lugares. Finally, Santiago de diciembre a diciembre is a love story that takes place during the government of Salvador Allende and the military coup of 11 September 1973.

She was professor of Chilean Theater and Dramatic Construction at University of Chile. She also taught at the Universidad Técnica del Estado and the Arrau Corporation. After Augusto Pinochet took power in Chile, Isidora Aguirre, who remained in the country, lost her university job, but in her trips through Latin America, taught theater in workshops in Quito, Cali, Bogotá, and Mexico.

She had two children with her first husband, Gerardo Carmona, and another two with the second, the Englishman Peter Sinclaire, from whom she also separated.

Isidora Aguirre Tupper died on the night of 25 February 2011 due to an internal hemorrhage. As her friend and writer Virginia Vidal commented: "To Isidora, Chile buried her owing her the National Prize for Literature that would have been a diminished recognition of her vast work as a novelist and dramatist."

Posthumously, a fifth novel of Aguirre's was published, Guerreros del sur, written in collaboration with Renato Peruggi and with a prologue by Andrea Jeftanovic. The book is inspired by Lientur, the toqui who defeated the Spaniards at the Battle of Las Cangrejeras on 15 May 1629.

In spite of her immense body of work, progressive spirit, defense of human rights, and patriotic activity, the Concertación governments repeatedly denied the National Prize for Literature to Isidora Aguirre. This fact was recalled by the dramatist Juan Radrigán in his acceptance speech for the prize in 2012.

== Selected works ==
=== La pérgola de las Flores ===
It narrates the fight that the Pergoleras of Santiago gave to not lose its traditional working places and the arrival of Carmela, a young peasant who arrived at the city of Santiago in the process of urbanization and modernization. It shows the contrast between the culture of the countryside and the capital; It is a story of love, of traditions, but also the negotiation between the lower classes and the authorities.

=== Los papeleros ===
It shows the indignant and inhuman subsistence carried by a group of collectors in the sixties, in a dump in the suburbs of Santiago. Different social conflicts are generated through key characters in the story, framed by poverty and discrimination.

=== Los que van quedando en el camino ===
It represent the uprising and the subsequent massacre of peasant that took place in the southern town of Ranquil in 1934. The subject is the property right of the land, a very hot problem. It presents the facts in the Brechtian way, highlighting the internal contradictions of the characters.

== Awards and distinctions ==
- Critical and Golden Laurel Award for Población Esperanza
- Critical Award for La pérgola de las flores
- Luis Alberto Heiremans Award for Popular Theater
- 1964 Santiago Municipal Literature Award for Los papeleros
- 1971 Santiago Municipal Literature Award for Los que van quedando en el camino
- Eugenio Dittborn Award for Lautaro
- 1987 Casa de las Américas Prize for El retablo de Yumbel
- Medal of Santiago for her contribution to national culture
- 2005 Pablo Neruda Order of Artistic and Cultural Merit

== Works ==
- 1938 – Ocho cuentos (children's), ed. Zig-Zag, Santiago, Chile
- 1948 – Wai-Kii (children's novel), ed. Rapa Nui, Santiago, Chile
- 1955 – Carolina (comedy)
- 1955 – La dama del canasto (comedy)
- 1956 – Pacto de medianoche (comedy in one act)
- 1956 – Anacleto Chin-Chin (children's farce in one act)
- 1956 – Entre dos trenes (drama in one act)
- 1957 – Dos y dos son cinco (comedy in three acts)
- 1957 – Las tres Pascualas (drama in three acts about the legend of the Three Pascualas about three women who kill themselves over the same man)
- 1957 – La micro (monologue for a woman, in one act)
- 1958 – Las sardinas o la supresión de Amanda (monologue for a man, in one act)
- 1959 – Población Esperanza (tragedy written with Manuel Rojas)
- 1960 – La pérgola de las flores (musical comedy; music and lyrics of three songs: Francisco Flores del Campo; direction of the premiere: Eugenio Guzmán)
- 1962 – Los papeleros (with songs by Gustavo Becerra). 1964 Municipal Award
- 1964 – Don Anacleto Avaro (farce, published in a volume of school theater)
- 1965 – La dama del canasto (play; with music by Sergio Ortega)
- 1969 – Los que van quedando en el camino (drama based on actual events; the title comes from a phrase from Che Guevara)
- 1970 – Quién tuvo la culpa de la muerte de la María González (play)
- 1972 – Cabezones de la feria (Educational Theater Contingent)
- 1972 – Historia de las JJCC (choreography by Patricio Bunster, direction by Víctor Jara, Estadio Nacional)
- 1974 – En aquellos locos años veinte (adaptation of La señorita charleston by Armando Moock)
- 1974 – La Desideria en el cielo (play; music by Luis Advis)
- 1975 – La leyenda de las tres Pascualas, (play, 2nd version)
- 1979 – Amor a la africana (comedy)
- 1980 – Los juglares (play)
- 1982 – Lautaro. Epopeya del pueblo mapuche (play)
- 1982 – Esos padres de la patria: Manuel Rodríguez (play; popular music epic)
- 1983 – Fuenteovejuna (Aguirre's adaptation of the classic play by Lope de Vega)
- 1984 – Mi primo Federico (piece whose action takes place in Granada))
- 1986 – Federico hermano (tribute to García Lorca, poetic drama)
- 1987 – El retablo de Yumbel (play), Casa de las Américas Prize
- 1987 – Doy por vivido todo lo soñado (novel)
- 1987 – El señor presidente (theatrical adaptation of the novel by Miguel Ángel Asturias)
- 1988 – Diálogos de fin de siglo (piece inspired by the tragedy of Chilean President José Manuel Balmaceda)
- 1988 – Tía Irene, yo te amaba (play)
- 1990 – Carta a Roque Dalton (novel)
- 1993 – Los libertadores Bolívar y Miranda (historical piece about Simón Bolívar and Francisco de Miranda)
- 1998 – Santiago de diciembre a diciembre (novel)
- 1999 – Manuel (piece based on the legend of Manuel Rodríguez)
- 2000 – El adelantado don Diego de Almagro (play about Diego de Almagro)
- 2003 – ¡Subiendo..., último hombre! (piece about the closure of coal mines in Lota)
- 2007 – Isidora Aguirre: antología esencial. 50 años de dramaturgia, Eds. Frontera Sur
- 2011 – Guerreros del sur (novel), with prologue by Andrea Jeftanovic, Santiago: Uqbar Editores
