= Silvia Urbina =

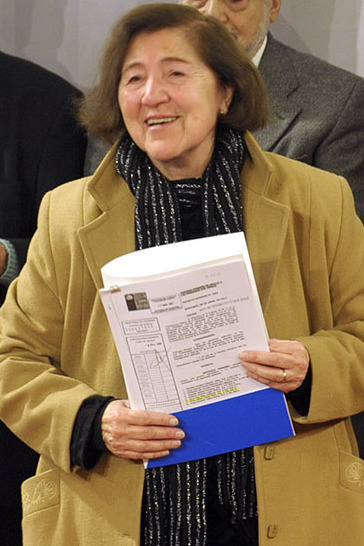
- Silvia Urbina in 2012

Background information
- Born: Silvia Ofelia Urbina Pinto; 4 January 1928
- Origin: Chile
- Died: 20 January 2016 (aged 88)
- Genres: Folk
- Occupations: Singer, folklorist and teacher
- Years active: 1955–2016

Silvia Ofelia Urbina Pinto (4 January 1928 – 20 January 2016) was a Chilean singer, folklorist and teacher. Urbina had a vast trajectory in the investigation, research and dissemination of Chilean folk music. She was one of the founders of the Cuncumén folkloric group and later creator of the children's musical folkloric group, Cuncumenitos.

== Life and work ==
Qualified as a Kindergarten Educator, she began her folklore studies with Margot Loyola at the seasonal schools of the University of Chile, and increased her knowledge with her friend Violeta Parra. In addition, she took different courses with Gabriela Pizarro, Raquel Barros, Manuel Denneman and Onofre Alvarado, among others. Loyola also trained other musicians such as Víctor Jara or Rolando Alarcón.

Urbina was a member of the Communist Party from a very young age. She began her musical career in 1955 as one of the co-founders of the successful folkloric group, Cuncumén along with Rolando Alarcón. Cuncumén was the first mixed ensemble that studied, researched and disseminated national folklore.

With Cuncumén, she toured several countries, and had the opportunity to share the stage with Víctor Jara and Héctor Pavez. On May 31, 1961, the group together with Margot Loyola traveled to Europe to present the song and dance show, Folklore de Chile. For almost five months they toured Eastern Europe and the Soviet Union; while Loyola was hired to give recitals in Moscow and Bucharest, the group undertook a three-week tour of the Netherlands and France. After finishing the tour, Loyota returned to Chile, but the group still spent a short time in France to return to the country in October 1961.

She left the group and created Cuncumenitos, in which she applied her profession as an educator in the training of children dedicated to Chilean folklore. She sang and recorded duet albums with musicians like Rolando Alarcón and Patricio Manns. With the latter he recorded the voice of the song "Cautivo de Til Til". Later on, she would remain active in various folkloric stages. She has been president of the National Folklore Association of Chile, ANFOLCHI.

In October 2004 she was awarded the National Folklore Award, delivered by the Chilean Folklorists and Guitarists Union, in recognition of her forty years of work as a researcher and teacher. In 2012 she received a grace pension and a year later she was awarded the President of the Republic National Music Award. She, on January 20, 2016, died of a heart attack, at 88 years of age. At her funeral, she was fired by representatives of the Communist Party, and her remains were buried in the Metropolitan Cemetery. On April 22, a tribute was made in the Santiago commune of Quinta Normal, "Un canto y una danza", in which his son Ian Manns Urbina also participated, who is also a son of Patricio Manns.

== Discography ==
- Chile nuevo. Volumen 1 (1964, with Rolando Alarcón)
- El folklore no ha muerto, mierda! (1968, with Patricio Manns)
