= Gabriela Pizarro =

Chilean folklorist, researcher, teacher and songwriter

Background information
- Born: October 14, 1932; Lebu, Chile
- Died: December 29, 1999 (aged 67)
- Occupation(s): Folklorist, musician, teacher
- Instrument: Singing
- Formerly of: Millaray
- Spouse: Héctor Pavez (m. 1960; died 1975)

Gabriela Eliana Pizarro Soto (Gabriela Pizarro; October 14, 1932 – December 29, 1999) was a Chilean folklorist, a researcher, a teacher and a songwriter. She is considered one of the three leading researchers of Chilean folk, along with Violeta Parra and Margot Loyola.

== Life and work ==
Pizarro was the daughter of José Abraham Pizarro and Blanca Hortensia Soto Figueroa. Her mother had studied at Chile's National Conservatory of Music and she was in her church choir, in an orchestra, and in theater and opera groups in Lebu. Gabriela was introduced to folk when she accompanied her father to collect rent from his tenants. Her mother influenced her in her early years, along with her grandmother, Elba González, who was a tavern singer.

In 1939, her family moved to Santiago, where she enrolled in Normal School No. 2. She participated in the school musical group and took guitar lessons with Professor Isabel Soro, whose recommendation helped her into a course lectured by Margot Loyola in summer school at the University of Chile. The first tunes, waltzes, cuecas, and boleros that she learned to play were the definitive start of her career. There she met Silvia Urbina, Jaime Rojas, Rolando Alarcón, and Víctor Jara, among many others, who motivated her in her work as a researcher, teacher, and interpreter of Chilean folk.

=== Loyola y Parra, the teacher and the godmother ===
Pizarro had already seen the famous duo, the Loyola Sisters, act in Santiago, and then she found a teacher in Margot who valued the popular art that she had learned about in her childhood.

«I had to take a test in order to participate in a singing event in the Baquedano Theater. I had to pick out a second voice in the cueca...It rains in the mountains and thunders in the sea...I had already picked out the noise, and she said ‘Tell that little girl to come over here.’ And that's why she valued me,» she remembered. «I adored her. There was something crazy behind Margot. It was fascinating.»

With that momentum, in 1956, Gabriela Pizarro returned to Lebu and interviewed the singers Noemí Chamorro, de Quiapo, and Olga Niño, among others. From them she learned the cueca, the mazurka, tunes, religious songs, and dances like the chapecao and the chincolito, and she formed her first repertoire based on Lebu songs and dances of the folk group. And a second fundamental discovery was about to come. In 1957, Violeta Parra, who was on tour, stood in for the radio broadcast “Imágenes camperas,” that the singer had on the Chilean radio.

«They needed someone to fill the space for folk on the radio. There sang Violeta. I admired her. She was the same as all the women that I had met in the country.» The replacement lasted 3 months. «And I knew Violeta from her arrival. When I auditioned for her, I had prepared culen punch and some black biscuits to honor her. She had me sing the tune “La jardinera,” which I knew very well, and it interested her. After, she had parties, and sometimes called me so that we could collaborate.» Some of those invitations came from the shelter of Violeta Parra in the Cousiño Park (1958) and her tent in La Reina (1965).

In 1958, she founded the Millaray Group. The folk band was introduced around 1960 at the Municipal Theater of Santiago, where an extensive investigation occurred in Chile, where they compiled dances like the pavo, the cielito, the trastrasera, the pericón, and many others. In the group, she met the folklorist Héctor Pavez, who she would later marry.

Starting in 1966, she taught in the Science, Musical Art, and Drama Departments in the University of Chile. She was hired as a folk guitar professor in the Department of Folk Instruction in the Music School of Vespertina, taught the same subject in the Department of Music from 1968 onwards, and taught folk dance in the Department of Dance starting in 1971. With the Millaray Group, she recorded 5 long records, whose worked together until the 1973 Chilean Coup, when many of the group's members, including Gabriela Pizarro, were persecuted politically.

After 1973 and then death of Héctor Pavez in exile in 1975, the current economic and social situation forced her to become a popular street singer, mainly performing in the La Vega central market and in folk clubs that were successful during the time. Later, she received invitations from outcasts, so she visited France and England in 1978, where she was named a member of the Institute of Song and Dance of Britain, Holland, Spain, and Finland in 1985 and Canada in 1987. Similarly, she recorded the tapes "El folclor en mi escuela" and "Danzas tradicionales" in 1979 for Alerce Productions, and she put on the show “Nuestro Canto” with Ricardo García in the Cariola Theater.

In 1987, she resumed her work as a researcher, especially about romance. Under the guidance of the University of Chile, she recorded the tape “Romances Cantados.” One year later, she published the book Cuadernos de terreno, in which she displayed a large part of her investigative work. With the return of democracy in Chile, she edited her book Veinte tonadas religiosas and became president of the National Association of Folklore of Chile (ANFOLCHI), among many other activities, that would be interrupted by her death in 1999.
