= Juan Allende-Blin =

Chilean composer and academic teacher (born 1928)

- Born: 24 February 1928 (age 97); Santiago de Chile
- Education: University of Santiago; Darmstädter Ferienkurse
- Occupations: Composer; Music publicist; Academic teacher
- Organizations: University of Santiago; Norddeutscher Rundfunk
- Awards: Bundesverdienstkreuz; Premio Nacional de Artes Musicales de Chile; Order of Merit of North Rhine-Westphalia
- Website: www.allende-blin.de

Juan Allende-Blin (born 24 February 1928) is a Chilean composer and academic teacher who lives in Germany.

== Career ==
Born in Santiago de Chile, Allende-Blin studied first with his uncle, Pedro Humberto Allende, and with Fré Focke, a pupil of Anton Webern. He then studied at the University of Santiago, and with Olivier Messiaen at the Darmstädter Ferienkurse. He was professor of musical analysis at the University of Santiago from 1954 to 1957. In 1957 he moved to Germany and worked from 1962 for the broadcaster Norddeutscher Rundfunk in Hamburg. He has lived as a free-lance composer in Essen, together with the composer and organist Gerd Zacher, until Zacher's death.

Allende-Blin composed instrumental music, two ballets, chansons and music for tape. He reconstructed and orchestrated Debussy's unfinished opera La Chute de la Maison Usher. As a music publicist, he wrote about musicians and exile. His compositions were published by Edition Gravis.

== Selected works ==
- Transformationen for brass, percussion, celesta and piano
- Profils for clarinet, trumpet, trombone, cello and percussion
- Magnetfelder for piano, clarinet, double bass and tape
- Transformations III for percussion, 1952
- Transformations IV for Klavier, 1960
- Echelons for organ, 1962–68
- Silences interrompus for clarinet, double bass and piano, 1969/1970
- Mein blaues Klavier for organ, Drehorgel and Maultrommel, 1970
- Zeitspanne for piano, 1971–74
- Souffle for two choirs and projections, 1972
- Perspectives : pour clarinette en si b, 1977
- Des Landes verwiesen / konzertante und szenische Aktionen, 1978, libretto: Jean-Pierre Faye
- Rapport sonore / Relato sonoro / Klangbericht, musical radio feature, Karl-Sczuka-Preis 1983
- Dialogue for piano and two Interpreters, 1983
- Coral de caracola for organ, 1985
- Transformations V for organ and chamber ensemble, 1987
- Tagebuchgesänge after Franz Kafka and Lautréamont for two baritones and chamber orchestra, premiere 1987
- Streichquartett, 1995
- Walter Mehring – ein Wintermärchen / Imaginäre Szene für Bariton und Kammerensemble, 1998
- Le Voyage, cantata for baritone and ten instruments, 2001
- Transformations VII pour 14 instruments, 2003
- Gegenträume / contre-rêves - radiophone Klangcollage, 2003
- Wunde am Ende der Zeit - radiophone Klangcollage, 2003
- Wandlungen - radiophone Klangcollage, 2005
- Traumräume - radiophone Klangcollage, 2007
- Cantate à trois for soprano, tenor, baritone and 4 ensembles, 2007

== Selected discography ==
- Die Klaviermusik von Juan Allende-Blin, Thomas Günther, piano, Cybele SACD 160.401
- Die Orgelmusik von Juan Allende-Blin, Gerd Zacher, organ, Cybele SACD 060.401

== Publications ==
- Ein Leben aus Erinnerung und Utopie, Essays, edited by Stefan Fricke and Werner Klüppelholz, Pfau, Saarbrücken 2002, ISBN 3-8972-7184-2
- Kirchenmusik unter Hitler. In Hanns-Werner Heister, Hans-Günther Klein (Hg.): Musik und Musikpolitik im faschistischen Deutschland, Fischer Taschenbuch Verlag, Frankfurt a.M. 1984, ISBN 3-596-26902-4.

== Awards ==
- Karl Sczuka Prize (1983)
- Bundesverdienstkreuz am Bande (5 October 1999)
- Order of Merit of North Rhine-Westphalia (2009)
- National Prize for Musical Arts (Chile) (2018)
