= José Goles =

Background information
- Birth name: José Goles Radnic
- Born: March 10, 1917; Antofagasta, Chile
- Origin: Chile
- Died: June 8, 1993 (aged 76); Santiago, Chile
- Occupation: Composer
- Years active: 1939-1987

José Goles Radnic (March 10, 1917 - June 8, 1993) was a Chilean composer and songwriter active from 1939 to 1987. He was the son of immigrants from Yugoslavia and grew up in Antofagasta. His most famous songs include "El paso del pollo", "Simbad el marino", “Póngale que póngale”, “Así es el amor”, “Evocacion”, “Sureña linda”, “Paloma torcaza” and “La gallina francolina ". He also organized the Chilean composers union to recognize and enforce the rights of songwriters in their compositions. In 1987, he was the first person to be honored with the designation as fundamental figures of Chilean music.
