= Leonor Oyarzún =

First Lady of Chile from 1990 to 1994

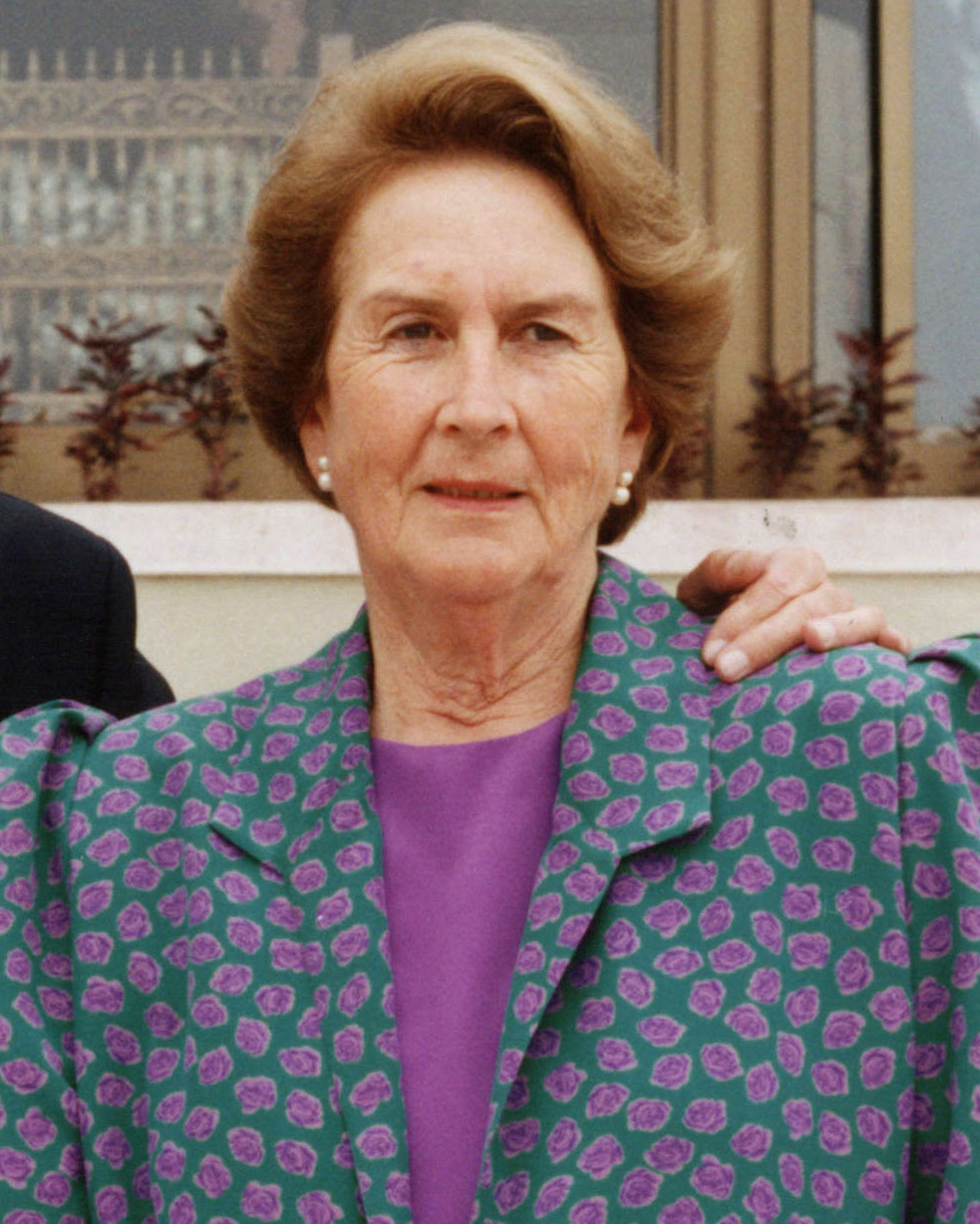
- Oyarzún in 1992

First Lady of Chile
- In role 11 March 1990 – 11 March 1994
- President: Patricio Aylwin
- Preceded by: Lucía Hiriart
- Succeeded by: Marta Larraechea

Personal details
- Born: Leonor Oyarzún Ivanovic; 10 March 1919 Temuco, Chile
- Died: 21 January 2022 (aged 102) Santiago, Chile
- Party: Christian Democratic Party
- Spouse: Patricio Aylwin (m. 1948; died 2016)
- Children: Isabel; Miguel; José Antonio; Juan Francisco; Mariana

Leonor Oyarzún Ivanovic (10 March 1919 – 21 January 2022) was a Chilean family therapist and member of the Christian Democratic Party (PDC). She served as the First Lady of Chile from 1990 until 1994 as the wife of President Patricio Aylwin.

== Early life ==
She was born on 10 March 1919 in Temuco, the daughter of Manuel Oyarzún Lorca and Ana Ivanović Roccatagliata. Her father died when she was young. She helped her mother with her five younger sisters.

Oyarzún read an article Aylwin wrote in the National Falange and wanted to meet him. They were introduced by a friend. After dating ten months she married Aylwin on 29 September 1948. The couple had five children. Their daughter Mariana was the Education Minister of Ricardo Lagos' government. Her sister Mercedes was married to politician Hugo Trivelli.

== Politics ==
Oyarzún was a Christian Democrat. She said that though she actively participated with the party her "vocation has always been social action." Prior to becoming First Lady, she was involved with Catholic Action, a group which advocates for increased Catholic influence on society. She helped found CEMA Chile (Central Network of Mothers' Centers) and became the first vice-president. However, the organization was vastly changed when Lucía Hiriart assumed control in 1974. It ended in disgrace after a court ruling in 2022.

In 1967 she enrolled at the Instituto Carlos Casanueva to become a Family and Youth Counselor. After graduating she worked in a group she formed with other graduates. She left the group when she became First Lady.

Oyarzún's experiences prior to becoming First Lady led to a holistic view of the family, women, and the world of children. When she became First Lady, the Sociocultural Coordination of the Presidency of the Republic was created and she became the coordinator. As part of that agency, Oyarzún transformed the National Foundation for Community Aid (FUNACO) into the National Foundation for the Integral Development of Children (Integra). Initially the program focused on early education for children whose families were in extreme poverty. They covered children from age two to age six and were sure to include disabled children and children from diverse ethnic backgrounds. She said, "Helping children is a social investment and a moral imperative."

She also created the Foundation for the Promotion and Development of Women (PRODEMU). It is a state-run foundation that seeks to promote women's personal empowerment and economic autonomy. Another program she created was the Family Foundation. It provides spaces where families can increase their bonds through education and recreation.

== Death ==
After Aylwin's presidency both remained active in politics. Oyarzún's last public appearance was to vote in May 2021.

Oyarzún turned 100 in March 2019. In 2020 she contracted Covid and there were rumors of her death. She died in Santiago on 21 January 2022, at the age of 102.

Honorary titles
Preceded by Lucía Hiriart	First Lady of Chile; 1990–1994	Succeeded by Marta Larraechea
