= National Prize for Musical Arts (Chile) =

- To the person who has distinguished himself by his achievements in the respective area of the arts
- Country: Chile
- First award: 1992

The National Prize for Musical Arts (Spanish: Premio Nacional de Artes Musicales) was created in Chile in 1992 under Law 19169 as one of the replacements of the National Prize of Art. It is granted "to the person who has distinguished himself by his achievements in the respective area of the arts" (Article 8 of the aforementioned law). It is part of the National Prize of Chile.

The prize, which is awarded every two years, consists of a diploma, the sum of 6,576,457 pesos (US$8,665) which is adjusted every year, according to the previous year's consumer price index, and a pension of 20 monthly tax units (approximately US$1,600).

== Winners ==
- 1992, Juan Orrego-Salas
- 1994, Margot Loyola
- 1996, Carlos Botto Vallarino
- 1998, Elvira Savi
- 2000, Carlos Riesco
- 2002, Fernando García
- 2004, Cirilo Vila
- 2006, Fernando Rosas Pfingsthorn
- 2008, Miguel Letelier
- 2010, Carmen Luisa Letelier
- 2012, Juan Pablo Izquierdo
- 2014, Leon Schidlowsky
- 2016, Vicente Bianchi
- 2018, Juan Allende-Blin
- 2020, Miryam Singer
- 2022, Elisa Avendaño Curaqueo
- 2024, Valentín Trujillo
