= Marta Larraechea =

Chilean politician and first lady (born 1944)

Marta Larraechea Bolívar
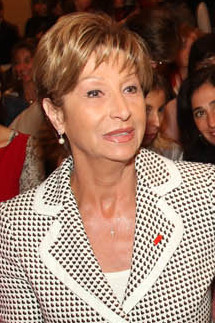

First Lady of Chile
- In role March 11, 1994 – March 11, 2000
- President: Eduardo Frei Ruiz-Tagle
- Preceded by: Leonor Oyarzún
- Succeeded by: Luisa Durán

Personal details
- Born: Marta de Larraechea y Bolívar; August 30, 1944 (age 81) Constitución, Chile
- Party: Christian Democratic Party
- Spouse: Eduardo Frei Ruiz-Tagle (m. 1967)
- Children: Verónica; Cecilia; Magdalena; Catalina
- Parents: Vasco de Larraechea Herrera; Victoria Bolívar Le Fort
- Awards: Grand Cross of the Order of the Sun of Peru; Order of Isabella the Catholic Dame Sash (Grand Cross)

Marta Larraechea Bolívar (born August 30, 1944 in Constitución, Talca Province) is a social orientator, politician and wife of Chilean President Eduardo Frei Ruiz-Tagle. She was a council member of the Santiago municipality (2000–2004) and First Lady of Chile (1994–2000). She is the daughter of Vasco de Larraechea Herrera and Victoria Bolívar Le Fort.

She studied as a child at "Inmaculada Concepción" school in Concepción, Secretaryship and Social Orientation at Instituto Carlos Casanueva. She and Eduardo Frei Ruiz-Tagle were married on November 30, 1967 and they have four children, Verónica, Cecilia, Magdalena and Catalina. She identifies as a Roman Catholic and close friend of Hillary Clinton and Carlos Menem.

== Electoral Resume ==
=== Municipal Elections 2000 ===
Municipal Elections 2000 for Santiago mayoralty

| Candidate | Party | Votes | % | Results |
|---|---|---|---|---|
| Joaquín Lavín Infante | UDI | 73.088 | 60,99 | Mayor |
| Marta Larraechea Bolívar | PDC | 34.993 | 29,20 | Council |
| Marisol Prado Villegas | ILB | 2.207 | 1,84 | |
| Tomás Hirsch Goldschmidt | PH | 2.067 | 1,72 | |

== See also ==
- First Ladies of Chile
- Frei family

Honorary titles
| Preceded by Leonor Oyarzún | First Lady of Chile; 1994–2000 | Succeeded by Luisa Durán |
