= Tincho Zabala =

Uruguayan film actor

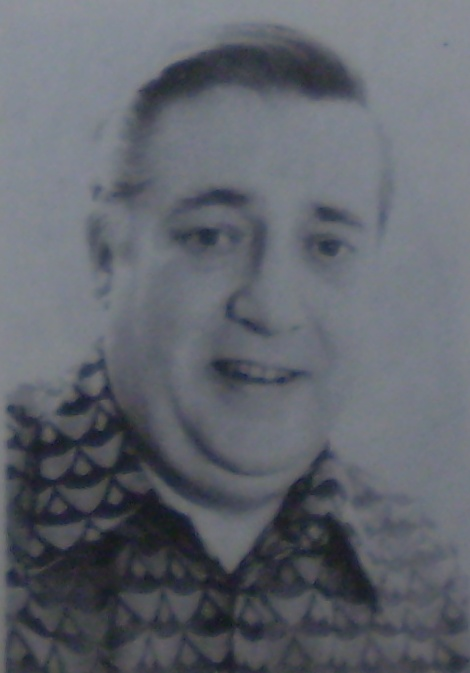
- Tincho Zabala in 1982
- Born: Martín Pedro Zabalúa Marramoti; 4 February 1923; Montevideo, Uruguay
- Died: 23 February 2001 (aged 78); Buenos Aires, Argentina
- Occupations: actor, comedian

Martín Pedro Zabalúa Marramoti, known as Tincho Zabala (4 February 1923 in Montevideo – 23 February 2001 in Buenos Aires, Argentina) was a Uruguayan actor. He was active in radio, television and movies from his debut radio broadcast in 1937 for almost 60 years. His filmography includes more than 40 films.

== Selected filmography ==
- La pérgola de las flores (1965)

== Sources ==
- "Tincho Zabala". Find A Grave, Inc. 2002-12-28.
- Tincho Zabala at IMDb
