= Roberto Lecaros =

Chilean musician and composer (1944–2022)

Robert Lecaros
- Born: Roberto Lecaros Venegas; 11 August 1944; Santiago, Chile
- Died: 29 April 2022 (aged 77) Santiago, Chile
- Years active: c.1944–2022

Roberto Lecaros Venegas (11 August 1944 – 29 April 2022) was a Chilean jazz musician and composer of music for film, theater, and popular music. He played wind, string, and keyboard instruments, including the violin, double bass, trumpet, cornet, flute, piano and accordion. He was one of the patriarchs of the Lecaros family of musicians.

== Biography ==
At the age of three, he began studying violin and at the age of five, he entered the National Conservatory of Music of the University of Chile. In 1958, he discovered jazz when he saw the Goodway Jazz Band play at a university dance. Its director, the clarinetist Juan Sillano, invited Lecaros to play the tuba, initiating him into jazz. Lecaros went on to lead the band, playing the cornet, making the arrangements and exercising his musical direction.

In the 1960s he created and participated in various musical groups, notably: Village Trio, Chilean Jazz Messengers, and was part of various Hot Club (Gypsy Jazz) groups playing the violin.

At the end of the 60s he created the first group of Funky de Chile with Mario Lecaros, Pablo Lecaros and Jaime O'Ryan.

At the beginning of the 70s he accompanied various groups of Bossa Nova and Jazz, highlighting groups with Octavio Espinoza, Nelly Sanders, Nene Lecaros, Carmen Barros, Luz Eliana, Fresia Soto, Malú Gatica and Sonia la Única.

In 1972 he participated together with the group "Swingteto" in the first jazz concert held at the Municipal Theater of Santiago de Chile.

In 1975 he traveled to Peru where he cooperated in various popular music projects. In 1976 he moved to Bolivia where he performed as the first double bass in the orchestras "Sinfónica de la Paz" and "Orquesta de Cámara del Teatro Municipal", he also carried out teaching activities of various instruments and theoretical branches at the Conservatory of La Paz. At the same time, he formed groups such as the Harlem group and Hot Club de la Paz, interpreting jazz and popular music. At this time he participated in the La Paz and Cochabamba Jazz Festival.

In the 1980s he returned to Chile forming the first jazz and popular music workshop that would start the first jazz school in Chile, traveling the country with his students giving concerts at universities, cultural institutes, theaters and concert halls.

In 1982 he traveled to Spain with his family, collaborating in the "Taller de Musica" in Barcelona, joined the "Barcelona Swing Machine" with Peter Delphinich, played cornet and violin in the "Bomba" orchestra with Juan Soriano, formed together Pere Soto the Djangoscastle group and with his brother Mario Lecaros formed the “Lecaros Latin Jazz Quartet”. During this time he toured the European jazz circuit playing violin, cornet, piano and electric bass.

In 1987 he returned to Chile forming prominent groups such as "Kamerectrica", a jazz rock group in the vein of Jean Luc Ponty. He also formed the "Nouvelle Orleans Washburn Band" with which he played the cornet in the Bixian style. In this period he organized the first jazz festivals in Coquimbo, Providencia, and Santiago.

In 1996 he moved to Temuco where he founded the "School of Music and Jazz", and the "Club de Jazz de Temuco". In this city, he formed the following groups: "Temuco Swing Machine", "Temuco Jazz Band", "Quinteto Hot Club de Temuco", "Kamerectrica Temuco", children's orchestra "Música Viva" and the classical music group "Pentagrama". He chaired the Temuco Philharmonic Orchestra and was head of the second violins. He remained in Temuco until 2009.

In 2014, he was the recipient of the fundamental figures of Chilean music award.

== Discography ==
=== Music for works of radio, film and theater ===
- 1968 - Film Lunes primero, domingo siete. (Helvio Soto)
- 1984 - Con Ardiente Paciencia (Antonio Skármeta)
- 1985 – Despedida en Berlín (Antonio Skarmeta)
- 1989 - Matchball (Antonio Skarmeta)
- 1990 - Maremagnum (Antonio Skarmeta)

=== Studio albums ===
- Village Trio (1964, LR Ortiz)
- Los Chasquis Volumen 1 (1975, RCA)
- Los Chasquis Volumen 2 (1975, RCA)
- La Muñeca (1975, ODEON)
- Taxi Libre (1976)
- Mística (2010)
- 69 (2014)

=== Live albums ===
- Goodway Jazz Band (1964)
- Hot Jazz (1994)
