= Cirilo Vila =

Chilean composer, pianist, and academic

Cirilo Vila Castro
- Born: 7 October 1937; Santiago, Chile
- Died: 23 July 2015 (age 77) Santiago, Chile
- Occupations: Composer, musician, academic
- Instrument: vocals

Cirilo Vila Castro (7 October 1937 – 23 July 2015) was a Chilean composer, pianist, and academic, and the winner of the National Prize for Musical Arts in 2004.

== Career and life ==
Castro began his musical studies at age seven at the National Conservatory of Music of the University of Chile, where he majored in Music Performance with a minor in pianos in 1959. He participated in the Symphony Orchestra of Chile in 1954, and was awarded the Orrego Carvallo award in 1957. In parallel, he studied composition with Alfonso Letelier (1954–1958) and Gustavo Becerra-Schmidt (1960–1961). In the early 1960s, thanks to a grant from the Italian government, he traveled to Rome to study conducting at the Santa Cecilia Conservatory with Professor Franco Ferrara. Later, he continued his training with Professor Pierre Dervaux in Paris. Between 1964 and 1969, he took private lessons in musical composition with Professor Max Deutsch and analysis with composer Olivier Messiaen.

=== Composing ===
Vila compositions were diverse. In popular music, they included transcriptions of songs by Víctor Jara and songs composed for the group Quilapayún. In the area of scholarly or experimental music, he has composed many works premiered at major festivals of contemporary music in the country. He has written for nationally renowned artists such as the guitarist Luis Orlandini, the horn player Edward Brown, tenor José Quilapi and pianist Cecilia Plaza, among others. In addition, he has composed music for theatrical productions and works for musical performances. In over 50 years of activity he wrote works for different genres ranging from orchestra, chorus, chamber ensembles, to soloists. His latest works include De sueños y evanescencia (2003) for ensemble, premiered by the Contemporary Music Workshop of PUC, led by Pablo Aranda, Del diario de viaje de Johann Sebastián (2001) for cello and piano, and Bodandina con ecos de plata (2001) for two horns. He also composed a symphonic work entitled Germinal which was premiered in 1989 by the Philharmonic Orchestra of Santiago in the Municipal Theater of Santiago.

=== Teaching ===
The teaching of the master Vila began in 1970 at the Faculty of Arts, University of Chile. There he was responsible for the formation of an important generation of Chilean musicians of the 1970s and 1980s, many of whom now play a vital role in the country's music scene.

=== Death ===
Cirilo Vila died of a heart attack on 23 July 2015 at the age of 77.

== Discography ==
- Eisler - Brecht: Canciones (1971) (with Hans Stein)
- Obras de cámara (2013) (SVR Producciones)
