= La pérgola de las flores =

1965 film

- Film poster
- Directed by: Román Viñoly Barreto
- Written by: Isidora Aguirre; Francisco Flores del Campo
- Produced by: Cesáreo González; Benito Perojo
- Starring: Marujita Díaz
- Cinematography: Américo Hoss
- Edited by: Jorge Gárate
- Release date: July 1965
- Running time: 96 minutes
- Countries: Argentina; Chile; Spain
- Language: Spanish

La pérgola de las flores is a 1965 internationally co-produced comedy film directed by Román Viñoly Barreto based on the Chilean musical of the same name. It was entered into the 4th Moscow International Film Festival.

== Cast ==
- Marujita Díaz (as Maruja Diaz)
- Antonio Prieto
- Beatriz Bonnet
- Teresa Blasco
- María Antonia Tejedor (as M Antonia Tejedor)
- Carmen Caballero
- Mariel Comber
- Rodolfo Onetto
- Dringue Farías (as Dringue Farias)
- Tincho Zabala
- Guido Gorgatti
