= Gustavo Becerra-Schmidt =

Chilean composer (1925–2010)

- Born: August 26, 1925; Temuco, Chile
- Died: January 3, 2010 (aged 84); Oldenburg, Germany
- Occupation: Composer
- Website: gbecerrasc.scd.cl

Gustavo Becerra-Schmidt (August 26, 1925 – January 3, 2010) was a Chilean composer.

== Biography and career ==
Becerra-Schmidt was born in Temuco, Chile. He studied at The Chilean National Conservatory, and was taught by Pedro Humberto Allende. Then in Europe from 1953 to 1956, where he brought back the avant-garde music culture from Europe to Chile. 3 years later, Becerra-Schmidt became the director of the Instituto de Extension Musical (IEM) in 1959 to 1962, the IEM was an establishment by Domingo Santa Cruz, it aimed to centralize and manage the Chilean music repertoire and to support Chilean music organizations. During this time and after, Becerra-Schmidt was a teacher in the Chilean National Conservatory, he held this position until 1971 when he became a Cultural attaché between Chile and Bonn. 2 years later, Becerra-Schmidt moved to Germany due to the 1973 Chilean coup d'état, in Germany, Becerra-Schmidt taught at the University of Oldenburg beginning in 1974.

Becerra was also an important teacher. Some of his pupils are among the most important composers of Chile, these include Luis Advis, Sergio Ortega, Fernando García and Cirilo Vila.

Becerra-Schmidt died on January 3, 2010, at his home in Oldenburg.

== Compositions ==
Becerra was a prolific Chilean composer, his catalogue includes hundreds of compositions that goes from traditional to avant-garde to Aleatoric music, and from popular songs to large-scale cantatas, symphonies and oratorios. However, a large part of his musical career was politically involved, some of his cantatas included verses that were related to the Pre-Columbian era and Spanish colonization, Becerra-Schmidt's student Fernando García also wrote works based around political figures. (Note: However, some of these works were based around political figures as use for dramatic effects or as a dramatic story.)

Highlights among his output are the cantatas La Araucana and Lord Cochrane de Chile, the Macchu Picchu oratorio on texts by Pablo Neruda, the Concerto for Flute and Strings, and a most recent Harp Concerto from 2006. Important in his catalogue are also the electroacoustic works.

=== Selected works ===
232 Works of Becerra-Schmidt are "open source" available at the Becerra-Schmidt-Archiv of Oldenburg

=== Symphonic ===
- Sinfonía für Orchester (1955)
- Sinfonía (de profundis) für Orchester (1957)
- Concierto para Piano y Orquesta (1958)
- Konzert für Cello und Orchester (1983)
- Konzert für Schlagzeug und Orchester (1984)
- Concierto für Flöte, Gitarre, Orchester (1987)
- Variationen für Orchester (1992)
- Concierto para Guitarra y Orquesta für Gitarre, Orchester (1964/2003)
- Concierto para Oboe y Orquesta (2003)
- Concierto para Viola y Orquesta (2004)

=== Chamber ===
- Las Pascualas für Gitarre (1957)
- Sonata para Guitarra No. 2 für Gitarre (1956)
- Ludor y Latigo für Stimme, Gitarre (1963)
- Provocación für viele Soloinstrumente, Klavier (1970)
- Scanning Variations für solistische Instrumente (1972)
- Ossietzky Lied für Gitarren, Percussion, Sprecher, 5 Stimmen (1975)
- Sonata para 2 Guitarras für 2 Gitarren (1978)
- Charivari für Piccolo, Flöte, Bassflöte (1979)
- Die Statuten des Menschen für Kammerorchester (1990)
- 3 Stücke für Congas und Flügel für 4 Kongas, Flügel (1990)
- Black Holefür Kammerensemble (1995)
- Temucana für Solo Cello, Kammerorchester (1995)
- A toi de jouer für Ensemble (1997)
- Niggunium I, II, III für Flöte, Klavier (1999)
- Tasten für Klavier (2001)
- Amerindia für Flöten und Percussion (o. J.)

=== Chamber with Voice ===
- 5 Canciones Sefardistas (1958–59)
- Agua Dormida für Stimme, Flügel (1971)
- Los Satrapas (Die Lakaien) für Stimme und Kammerensemble (1973)
- Ossietzky Lied für Gitarren, Percussion, Sprecher, 5 Stimmen (1975)
- La Voz de Chile für Stimme und Klavier (1978)
- Memento für Quilapayun, d. h. Percussion, Gesang, Charango (1980)
- Revolución für 4 Männerstimmen (1981)
- Die Statuten des Menschen für Stimme und Klavier (1984)
- Die Ursachen des Krieges für Stimme (Tenor), Gitarre (1985)
- Das Schweigen für Alt, Klavier (1986)
- Kinderkreuzzug für Stimme (Rezitation), Orchester (1990)
- Chanukka für zwei Stimmen, Flöten, Klavier (1991)
- Versos sueltos für Sopran und Klavier (2003)

=== Vocal ===
- La Muerte de Rodrigo, Oper für Stimmen, Chor, Orchester (1945–1973)
- La Cueca Larga für Chor, Percussion, Klavier (1961)
- La Auracana für Chor, Rezitation, Orchester (1965)
- Cantata del Amor Americano für Chor und Orchester (1965)
- Macchu-Picchu für Sprecher, Sopran, Chor, Orchester (1966)
- Lord Cochrane de Chile, Kantate (1967)
- Elegia para muerte des Lenin (1970)
- Chile 1973, Kantate (1973–1974)
- Allende - Cantata Popular für Stimmen, Chor, Orchester (1978)
- Ossietzky Oratorium für Soli, Chor, Orchester (1983)
- Singen, wann? für Chor (1988)
- Kinderkreuzzug für Stimme (Rezitation), Orchester (1990)
- Trotz alledem für Chor und Orchester (1990–1991)
- Muerte del Mar für Chor und Orchester (1992)

=== Electronic Music ===
- Lenin (1971)
- Batuque (1971)
- Nocturno (1974)
- Progressiones (1976)
- Strukturen (1978–1980)
- Cuando (1978–1980)
- Quipus (1978–1980)
- Batallas para Allende (1979)
- Balistocata (1979)
- Oda al mar (1986)
- Interior (1987)
- Concierto para 4 pianos ampleados (2004)
- Poema para percuissiones nsampleados Música Cibernética (2008)

== Media ==
String Quartet No. 4
Part 1, Allegro

Part 2, Andante

Part 3, Allegro

Part 4, Allegro
All performed by the Philadelphia String Quartet
