= Dúo Rey-Silva =

- Origin: Chile
- Occupation: Singers

Dúo Rey-Silva was a Chilean musical duo consisting of Alberto Rey (1915-1991) and Sergio Silva (1917-2017). Both sang while Rey played the harp and Silva the guitar. They performed principally in the cueca and tonada traditions. They also performed in Chilean motion pictures from the 1940 to the 1960s. Rey was also known for his work as a soloist on the harp. In 1996, they were honored with the designation as fundamental figures of Chilean music.

== Discography ==
- América Canta - RCA Victor, CML-2011, 1959
- Asi Se Canta En Mi Tierra - RCA Victor, CML-2094, 1959
- Cuecas - RCA Victor, CML-2192, 1963
- Los Grandes De La Cueca, RCA Victor, 1965
- Cuecas Con Mostaza, RCA Victor, 1966
- Cuecas con Ají, RCA Victor, 1966
- ¡Cuecas Pa' Morir Bailando!, RCA Victor, CML-2401, 1966
- Puras Cuecas, RCA Victor, CML-2605-X, 1968
- El Estilo Tradicional del Dúo Rey, RCA Victor, CML-2769-X, 1969
- Las Cuecas De Siempre, RCA Victor, CML-2743-X, 1969
- Cuecas Bravas, RCA Victor, CML-2816-X, 1970
- ¡Esta es Cueca Compañero!, RCA Victor, CML-2890-X, 1971
- Internacional, RCA Victor, XXPL1-017, 1974
