= Hernán Núñez Oyarce =

Hernán Núñez
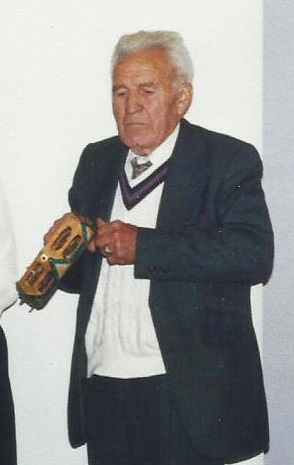

Background information
- Birth name: Hernán Raúl Núñez Oyarce
- Born: July 4, 1914; Santiago, Chile
- Origin: Chile
- Died: December 4, 2005 (aged 91); Santiago, Chile
- Occupation(s): Musician, composer

Hernán Raúl Núñez Oyarce (July 4, 1914 – December 4, 2005), also known as Nano Núñez, was a cuequero musician and composer. He was a founder of the Los Chileneros folk group. He also composed more than 100 cuecas.

Núñez, along with Luis Hernán Araneda (Baucha) and Raúl Lizama (Perico), founded the folk group Los Chleneros. In 1967, they recorded the album, La cueca centrina. The following year, they recorded the album, La cueca brava, with the addition of accordionist Carlos "Pollito" Navarro.

In 1998, Núñez became the 12th artist to receive the designation as one of the fundamental figures of Chilean music.

== Discography ==
- La Cueca Centrina: album recorded in 1967 and released by Odeón.
- La Cueca Brava: album recorded in 1968 and released by Odeón.
- La Cueca Brava y su época de oro: album recorded in 1973 and released by Odeón.
- Por los barrios bravos: album recorded in 1984 and released by Odeón.
- Los Chileneros en Vivo: album released in 2001 and released by Warner Music Group.
