= Willy Bascuñán =

Chilean musician

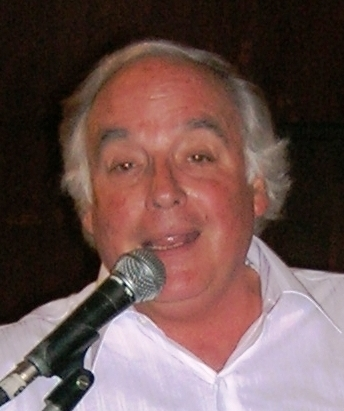
- Born: Guillermo Alfonso Bascuñán Dockendorff; November 19, 1942 (age 83); Viña del Mar, Chile
- Occupations: Composer and songwriter
- Website: www.willybascunan.scd.cl (in Spanish)

Guillermo "Willy" Alfonso Bascuñán Dockendorff (born 19 November 1942, in Viña del Mar), is a Chilean composer and actor. He is the only composer who has obtained both the first place in the folkloric and international competitions in the same edition of the Viña del Mar International Song Festival.

In 2016, he was recognized as one of the "fundamental figures of Chilean music" by the Chilean Society of Copyright.

== Biography ==
In the 1960s, along with Patricio Manns, Luis Urquidi, Violeta Parra, Isabel Parra, Ángel Parra, and Víctor Jara, he was one of the pioneers of the Chilean neo-folklore.

He composed many hits, such as "El solitaire", "El ovejero", "Cachimbo alegre" and "El maco Amengual", among others. He competed in both genres of the Viña del Mar Song Festival in 1967 with the songs "Cuando rompa el alba" (in the popular category) and "Voy pa 'Mendoza" (in the folkloric category), under the pseudonyms "El Fugitivo" and "Juan Carlos ", respectively. Their songs were the winners of the respective competitions that year.

He has also composed historical musical works such as "¡Al 7° de Línea!", which was the first stereo album and conceptual album recorded in Chile, whose song "Los viejos estandartes" (lit: The old standards), with lyrics by Jorge Inostroza and popularized by Los Cuatro Cuartos, which was a musical group he belonged to, would later become the official anthem of the Chilean Army.

In 2005 he released the CD entitled Soy del Sur, in which he sings together with Ginette Acevedo, Antonio Zabaleta and various Chilean musicians. That same year, he composed "Al 7° de Línea: Segunda Edición, La Nación en Armas".

As an actor, he participated with the comedian Ronco Retes in the comedic series "Troncal Negrete" on TVN, thus forming one of the most remembered comedic dio of the Chilean musical environment.

In 2018, he released an autobiographical book, "Tiempo y camino, autobiografía de Willy Bascuñán".

== Politics ==
He was an adherent of the military dictatorship and, a sympathizer of the Avanzada Nacional political party, he composed its anthem.

He participated in the television strip of the 1988 Chilean national plebiscite, campaigning for the "Yes" option.

Inspired by the arrest of Augusto Pinochet in London, he composed the song "Carta a los chilenos" (lit: Letter to Chileans) in his honor.
