= Ida Vivado =

Ida Vivado Orsini (1913–1989) was a Chilean pianist and composer.

== Biography ==
Ida Vivado was born in Tacna, Peru. She graduated from the National Conservatory of Music in Chile with a degree in Interpretation in 1941 and took a position on the faculty at the National Conservatory. She continued her studies in composition with Domingo Santa Cruz and Free Focke. She received a scholarship to study in Italy in 1958 and studied instrumentation with Salvador Candianni.

After completing her studies, Vivado worked as a composer, and served as president of the National Association of Composers of Chile (ANC) from 1971-73. Vivado married Don Marco Bontá, who died in 1974. She published the article "Alberto Spikin" in Reviste Musical Chilena (April–June 1972).

== Works ==
Selected works include:

- Estudios for piano (1966)
- Ocho Trozos, piano for four hands (1974)
- Tres Poemsa y una Canzion for voice and piano (1949)
- Tres Preludios y Tema con Variaciones for piano (1952)
- Suite for piano (1955)
- Seis Danzas Antiguas for piano (1955)
- Picaresca for voice and orchestra (1977)
- Series Alternadas for piano (1986)

Her music has been recorded and issued on CD:

- Chilean music of the twentieth century, vol. 2. Works by Ida Vivado, Juan Lemann Cazabon, Leni Alexander, Miguel Letelier, Luis Advis, Eduardo Caceres, Cirilo Vila, Andrew Mayor, Juan Coderch, Juan Amenábar Hernán Ramírez. Various performers. National Association of Composers of Chile (ANC), SVR, Audio CD (1998).
