= Fernando García (composer) =

Chilean composer

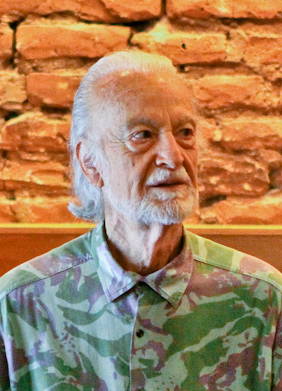
Fernando García in 2013

Fernando García (born July 4, 1930) is a Chilean composer. Active since 1956 he has done orchestral music, chamber music, etc. He studied with Juan Orrego-Salas and Gustavo Becerra-Schmidt, among others. His style is influenced by serialism and aleatoric procedures. He also played a role in the beginnings of electroacoustic music in Chile, after a trip he made to France in the early 1950s where he heard musique concrete. He was born in Santiago, Chile.

He worked for the Instituto de Extensión Musical of the University of Chile, and in 1962 he premiered the cantata América Insurrecta, which won an award at the Chilean Music Festival. After the Chilean coup-d'état, he was forced into exile, first in Perú (1973-1979), and then in Cuba (1979-1990). He returned to his country in 1989 and joined the Faculty of Arts of the University of Chile where he taught musicology until 2009.

In 2002, he received the National Prize for Musical Arts. In 2013 he was recognized by the Sociedad Chilena del Derecho de Autor (SCD) as one of the Fundamental figures of Chilean music.

== Selected works ==
- Variaciones for orchestra, 1959
- Sinfonía, 1960
- América Insurrecta, for speaker, chorus and orchestra, text by Pablo Neruda, 1962
- Quimera, theater piece after Federico García Lorca, 1965
- La arena traicionada (11 de marzo de 1966), 1967
- Firmamento sumergido, 1968
- Las raíces de la ira (En recuerdo de Víctor Jara), 1976
- Meditaciones, 1977
- Temblor de cielo, 1979
- Despertar de octubre (1917-1967), 1981
- Puntos cardinales for strings, 1984
- El reposo del guerrero, 1989
- Navegaciones for flute, harp and strings, 1990
- Crónicas americanas, 1992
- Se unen la tierra y el hombre for tape (voice of Pablo Neruda) and orchestra, 1992
- Zonas eriales for clarinet and chamber orchestra, 1995
- Tres miradas for strings, 1996
- Dos paisajes urbanos, 1997
- Misterios, 1998
- Tres cantos materiales for cello and strings, 1999
- Díptico sinfónico, 1999
- Rincones sordos for strings, 2001
- Nacerá la aurora (Hommage to Charles Ives), 2001
- Dura elegía (En recuerdo de Jorge Peña), 2002
- Dos temas de discusión for strings, 2003
- Luces y sombras, 2003
- Juegos for percussion and strings, 2003
- Nuevos juegos for percussion and strings, 2003
- Obertura concertante for percussion and orchestra, 2005
- Homenaje a Celso Garrido Lecca, for orchestra, 2005
- Implicaciones sonoras, for orchestra, 2005
- Imágenes siderales, 2006
- Signos de otoño, for string orchestra, 2011
- Tinieblas y Destellos, for string quartet, 2012
- De Norte a Sur, for drum kit and orchestra, 2013
- Detenidos Desaparecidos, for orchestra, 2014
- Sinergia, for orchestra, 2015
