= Donato Román =

Background information
- Born: December 4, 1915; Santiago, Chile
- Origin: Chile
- Died: November 23, 2004 (aged 87) San Antonio, Chile
- Occupation: Songwriter

Donato Román Heitman (December 4, 1915 - November 23, 2004) was a Chilean songwriter.

== Career ==
He was raised in a musical family in Santiago and entered the conservatory at age 12. At age 16, he composed a welcome march for Edward VII, Prince of Wales, who was visiting Chile. In 1934, at the age 19, he conducted the Orquesta Sinfónica de Chile in his work "Ballet del oro". In 1935, at age 20, he wrote his most famous song "Mi banderita chilena", which was recorded by many of Chile's important musicians and taught to generations of Chilean schoolchildren. In addition to popular song, he also composed symphonic works, chamber music, and music to accompany Chile's noted poets and for 16 Chilean films.

== Honours ==
In 1991, he became the fifth person to be honored with the designation as fundamental figures of Chilean music.
