= Luisa Durán =

Former First Lady of Chile

Luisa Durán de la Fuente
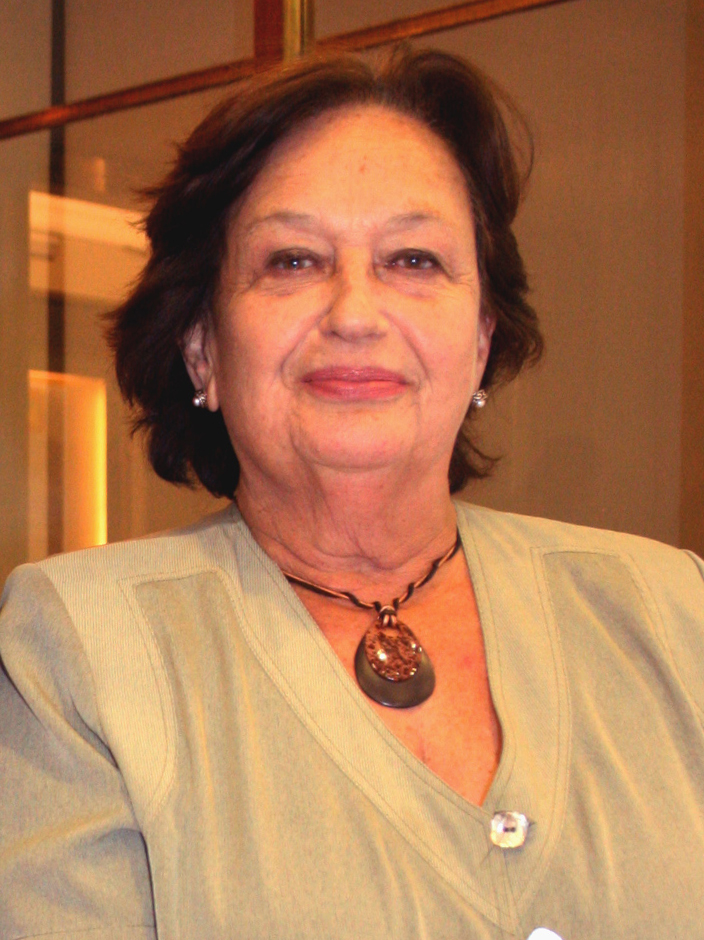

First Lady of Chile
- In role 11 March 2000 – 11 March 2006
- President: Ricardo Lagos Escobar
- Preceded by: Marta Larraechea Bolívar
- Succeeded by: Cecilia Morel

Personal details
- Born: 27 February 1941 (age 85) Santiago, Chile
- Spouse: Ricardo Lagos Escobar (m. 1971)
- Children: 2

Luisa Durán de la Fuente (born 27 February 1941) is the wife of the former President of Chile Ricardo Lagos. She was First Lady of Chile during her husband's tenure (2000-2006).

== Personal life ==
Durán was born to Hernán Durán Morales and Luisa de la Fuente Tavolara. She studied at the Alliance Française school in Santiago and the Number 7 High School of Providencia.

== Public life ==
During her time as First Lady, she preferred to be referred to as the President's wife. After the end of Lagos presidency, she was appointed executive director of the Youth and Children's Orchestras Foundation of Chile (2007-2010), and board member of Centro Cultural Matucana 100 and the Cultural Corporation of Santiago.

In 2013 she took over as director of the Corporación Cultural de Santiago.

In 2017 she returned to the public arena, regarding her spouse's presidential pre-candidacy, declaring in an interview that she had apprehensions regarding Lagos' decision, in order "not to have to be on the spot again, and to have this permanent bullying".

In October 2018 she resigned from the Party for Democracy.

Honorary titles
Preceded by Marta Larraechea	First Lady of Chile; 2000—2006	Succeeded by Cecilia Morel
