= Francisco Flores del Campo =

Francisco Flores del Campo (February 16, 1907 – December 11, 1993), also known as Pancho Flores, was a Chilean composer, instrumentalist and actor, considered one of the most relevant composers of popular music in the country. He won the folk competition of the Viña del Mar International Song Festival in 1964 with the tune "Qué bonita va", performed by Los Huasos Quincheros.

== Biography ==
Flores del Campo was born in the rural locality of Antonio Varas, in the outskirts of Santiago. He began his musical apprenticeship in 1923, when he began to study singing with Claudio Massuetto. In 1929 he obtained a scholarship from the Municipality of Viña del Mar to study in the United States, where he lived for eight years. There, he began a film career, acting in a minor role in the film El día que me quieras, alongside Carlos Gardel. At the same time, he performed in various hotels and nightclubs in New York and Los Angeles. With these experiences he returned to Chile in 1939, starring in one of the first national film productions, Romance de medio centenario (Chile Films), and later artistic director of the Municipal Casino of Viña del Mar.

A sore throat prevented him from keep singing, but this allowed him to focus on musical composition, in which he was prolific. Of the 150 registered works he penned, many of them have been successfully recorded by Chilean and foreign artists.

One of his best-known works is the musicalization of the work La pergola de las flores by the Chilean author Isidora Aguirre, a musical comedy released in 1960, and set in Santiago in the late 1920s. Flores del Campo composed the music in function of the rhythms in vogue of those years, adding to it melodies from Chilean folk music. In this way, he incorporated rhythms such as charleston, waltz ("Yo vengo de San Rosendo" or "Campo lindo"), cuecas ("La revolta"), tango-habanera ("Je suis Pierre") and tonada ("Tonada de medianoche").

== Death ==
Flores del Campo died on December 11, 1993, in Santiago, of a heart attack. His health was already debilitated after having throat cancer diagnosed the year before.
