= Andrea Jeftanovic =

Chilean author, sociologist and academic (born 1970)

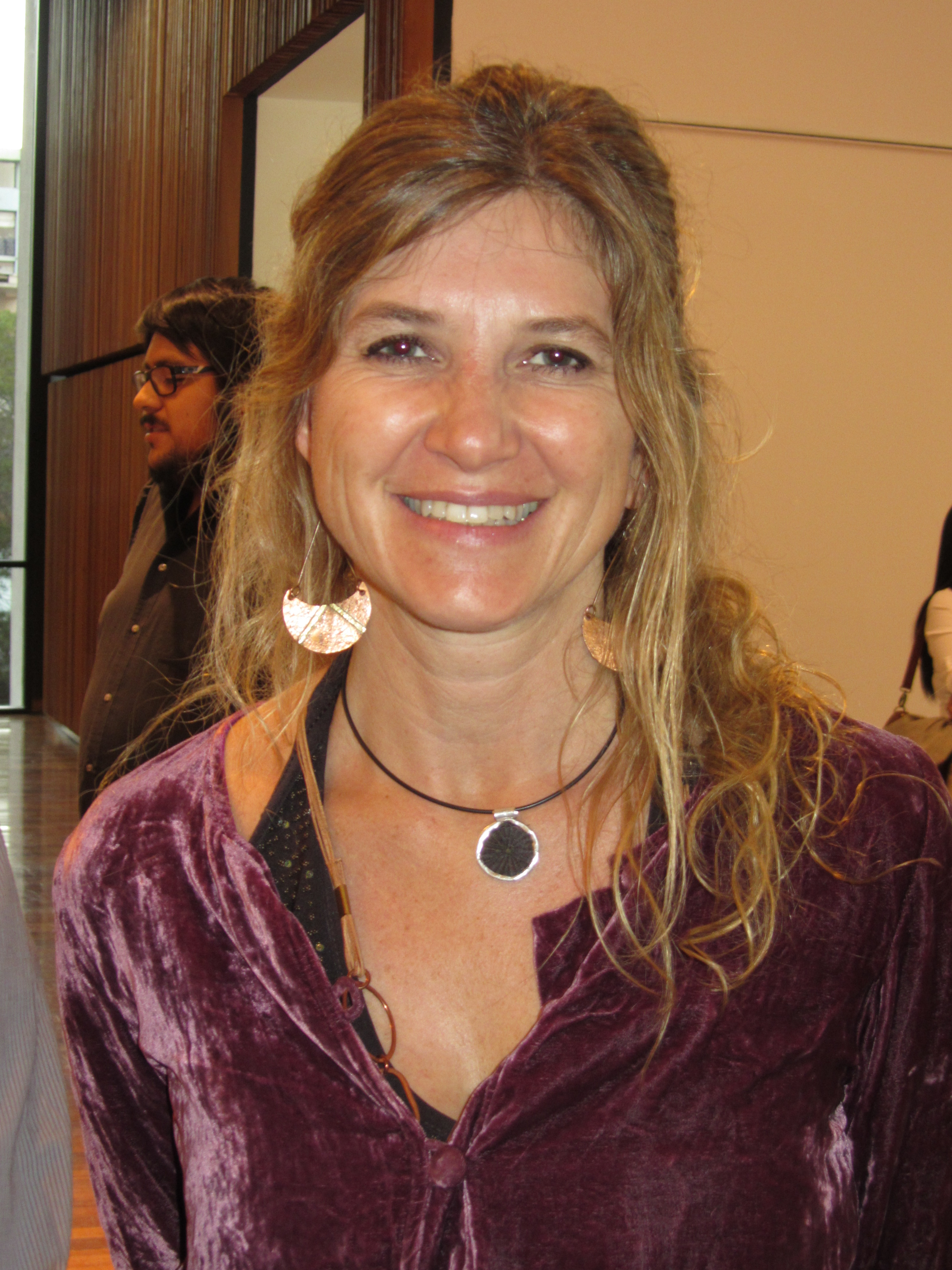
Chilean writer Andrea Jeftanovic at the presentation of Macarena Areco's book Cartography of the recent Chilean novel: realisms, experimentalisms, hybridizations and sub-genres, held at the Gabriela Mistral Cultural Center on April 2, 2015

Andrea Jeftanovic (born October 15, 1970, in Santiago de Chile) is a Chilean author, sociologist and academic.

Jeftanovic was three when the September 11, 1973 Chilean military coup took place. She grew up under Augusto Pinochet's military regime. Jeftanovic has commented that the 17 years of military dictatorship that Chileans lived under had a profound effect on the development of a Chilean identity, by interrupting how Chileans perceive themselves or how the world perceives Chile.

She graduated from the Universidad Católica in social science and earned a doctorate in Hispanic-American literature from the University of California, Berkeley. She has held an academic post at the University Diego Portales.

Jeftanovic is the daughter of a Serbian father and a mother of Bulgarian-Jewish descent.

== Works ==
- Escenario de guerra, novel, Alfaguara, Santiago, 2000 (Baladí, Madrid, 2010; Lanzallamas, Costa Rica, 2012; e-book, expanded and corrected: Patagonia, 2012)
- Monólogos en fuga, short stories, Animita Cartonera, 2006
- Geografía de la lengua, novel, Uqbar, Santiago, 2007
- Amar numa língua estrangeira, Editorial Teorema – Grupo Leya, Portugal, 2013
- Conversaciones con Isidora Aguirre, interviews, Frontera Sur, Santiago, 2009
- Hablan los hijos, essays, Cuarto Propio, 2011
- No aceptes caramelos de extraños, short stories, Uqbar, Santiago, 2011 (Seix Barral México, 2012; Editorial Casa de las Américas 2015- Cuba; Editorial Comba – Spain 2015)
- Destinos errantes, fiction chronicles, Editorial Comba, Barcelona, 2016 (Tajamar Editores, Santiago, 2017)

== Awards (Chile) ==
- Juegos Literarios Gabriela Mistral
- Consejo Nacional de la Cultura y las Artes
- Círculo de Críticos de Arte de Chile “Mejor obra literaria 2011"
