= Luis Urquidi =

Chilean musician

Councilmen of Santiago
- In office 1971–1973

Personal details
- Born: 3 July 1935 Antofagasta, Chile
- Died: 3 March 1994 (aged 58) Vina del Mar, Chile
- Party: National Party
- Spouse(s): Paz Undurraga; María Mandujano
- Children: Four
- Education: Pontifical Catholic University of Valparaíso
- Occupation: Musician

Luis Enrique Urquidi Holberton (3 October 1935 − 3 March 1994) was a Chilean musician and folklorist.

Despite he was born in Antofagasta, Urquidi grew up in Valparaíso, where then joined the Pontifical Catholic University of Valparaíso School of Law, career which he didn't end. Similarly, he was part of the nationalist band Los Cuatro Cuartos in the 1960s, decade where he helped to Willy Bascuñán to compose Los Viejos Estandartes («The Old Military Banners»), song which later was officially established as the anthem of the Chilean Army (1976).

A strong oppositor to the socialist president Salvador Allende, after the 1973 coup d'état, he supported the dictatorship of Augusto Pinochet through the creation of other marches like «Alborada», which honored the coup with allusions to 11 September. By the other hand, in 1971 he already was ruler of Santiago and in 1989 he failed to be elected as deputy for the 19th District composed by Independencia and Recoleta.
