= Apocalipsur =

2005 Colombian film

- Directed by: Javier Mejía Osorio
- Screenplay by: Javier Mejía Osorio
- Produced by: Albeiro Giraldo; Jairo Valencia; Darío González
- Starring: Andres Echavarría; Maricela Gómez; Pedro Ochoa; Ramón Marulanda; Camilo Díaz
- Cinematography: Juan Carlos Orrego
- Edited by: Erick Morris
- Music by: Mauricio Giraldo
- Release dates: October 2005 (Festival de Cine Bogotá); September 14, 2007 (Colombia)
- Running time: 101 minutes
- Country: Colombia
- Language: Spanish

Apocalipsur (English: Apocalipsouth) is a 2005 Colombian drama film written and directed by Javier Mejía Osorio. Set in 1990s Medellín, during the height of the drug war and the influence of Pablo Escobar's cartel, the film follows a group of young friends grappling with violence, exile, memory, and friendship. Noted for its raw depiction of urban life and its blend of realism and nostalgia, Apocalipsur received critical acclaim in Colombia. It won the Best Colombian Film and a Special Jury Prize at the 2007 Cartagena Film Festival, and was awarded funding by the Colombian Ministry of Culture's National Film Grant in 2002.

== Plot ==
Set in 1991 Medellín, the film follows a group of friends navigating life in a city torn by drug violence and political turmoil. One of them, El Flaco, leaves Colombia for Switzerland after threats against his mother. Before departing, he shaves his head and says goodbye to his closest friends—Caliche, Comadreja, Pipe (a boy in a wheelchair), and his girlfriend Malala—at a farewell party with live rock music.

Months later, El Flaco returns to Medellín, only to find the violence unchanged. Caliche and Malala are now dating, though she still harbors feelings for El Flaco. Caliche picks him up from the airport in their old Volkswagen van, nicknamed Bola de Nieve, joined by Comadreja and Pipe. On the ride, they share memories and anecdotes, reflecting on their chaotic lives. Malala is upset at Caliche for not telling her they were going to pick up El Flaco.

The group reminisces about the time Caliche and El Flaco were kidnapped. Locked in a makeshift cell, they bonded under threat of death. El Flaco had been abducted for being the son of a judge investigating a narco case, while Caliche was targeted over a dispute involving his father. In a twist, their captors are killed in a rescue mission, and the two teens escape.

As they drive through the city, the friends encounter signs of the ongoing drug war—military helicopters, police checkpoints, and Escobar wanted posters. They discuss the role of the United States in Colombia's drug conflict, critiquing the prohibition that fuels the violence. Caliche shares cocaine remnants he stole from his mother's boyfriend.

The film interweaves flashbacks, including one where El Flaco and Comadreja get caught by police while biking and smoking marijuana. The officers mock and beat them before abandoning them on the street after a violent street crime diverts their attention.

At a roadside café, Malala reveals a painful secret: the night of El Flaco's farewell, she had learned she was pregnant with Caliche's child but decided to get an abortion. El Flaco overheard her confession in the bathroom and broke down in tears. Caliche and Malala argue, but eventually reconcile.

Comadreja and Pipe play a prank on the café owner, pretending Comadreja is a foreigner. The friends then recall a wild night when they picked up a transvestite sex worker named María Antonieta. El Flaco, high and amused, kissed her, thinking she was a foreigner.

As they approach the airport, the friends reflect on El Flaco's lonely life in Switzerland, imagining him barefoot in the snow. They're pulling Pipe's wheelchair behind the van and arrive at a vacant lot near the José María Córdova Airport, where they await their friend's arrival. However, Comadreja forgets to close the van door, and El Flaco's pet iguana, named Marihuana, escapes.

Finally, it's revealed that El Flaco had died in exile. The friends are there not to welcome him back, but to recover his body. They return to Medellín with his coffin, reflecting on their lost youth and the devastation of their generation. During the ride, the van accidentally runs over the escaped iguana, and in the chaos, El Flaco's coffin falls into a stream. The film ends with the symbolic loss of both the friend and the pet he wished to be reincarnated as.

A final dedication appears on screen:

"For El Flaco, Carlos Bernal, who disappeared in Geneva (Switzerland) on October 23, 1991."

== Cast ==
- Andrés Echavarría Molletti....El Flaco
- Maricela Gómez....Malala
- Pedro Pabo Ochoa....Caliche
- Ramón Marulanda....Comadreja
- Camilo Díaz....Pipe
- Hernando Casanova el culebro....El Papito
- Sergio Valencia....The storekeeper

== Awards ==
Cartagena Film Festival

- Best Colombian Film 2007
- Special Jury Prize: Javier Mejía Osorio
