= Youth and Children's Orchestras Foundation of Chile =

- Fundación de Orquestas Juveniles e Infantiles de Chile
- Founder: Master Fernando Rosas, Luisa Durán
- Type: Nonprofit organization
- Legal status: Active
- Purpose: Musical development of children and young adults
- Headquarters: Santiago, Chile
- Location: Balmaceda 1301, Santiago, Chile
- Region served: Santiago Metropolitan Region
- President: Jorge Alberto Sebastián Dávalos Bachelet
- Key people: Fernando Rosas
- Website: www.orquestajuvenilchile.com

The Youth and Children's Orchestras Foundation of Chile (FOJI) (Spanish: Fundación de Orquestas Juveniles e Infantiles de Chile) is a non-profit organisation dedicated to the musical development of children and young adults in Chile.

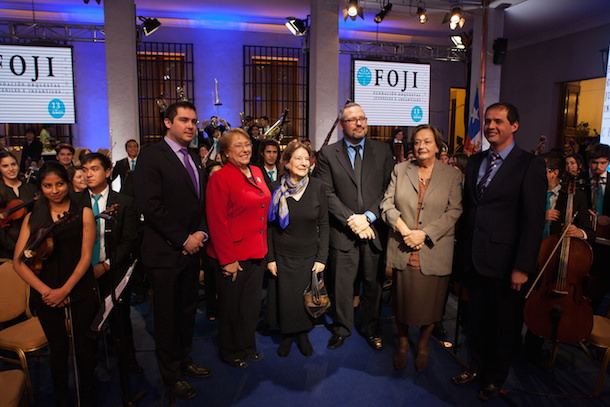
Chilean President Michelle Bachelet and Ex first lady Luisa Durán de Lagos in the thirteenth anniversary of FOJI in 2014

== History ==
The first youth orchestra created in Chile and South America, date back to the 1960s with the one created in the city of La Serena, led by conductor and composer Jorge Peña Hen although this experience ended in 1973, will be and inspiration for the creation of FOJI.

FOJI begun in 2001 on the initiative of then first lady Luisa Durán de Lagos and 2006 National price of Music and Arts master Fernando Rosas Pfingsthorn, the Foundation forms a part of the Sociocultural Directorate of the Chilean Presidential office.

== Mission ==
The Foundation's mission is "to elevate the social, cultural and educational development of Chile, offering opportunities so that children and young people from all over Chile improve their quality of life through being involved in orchestras". It offers 1,500 scholarships annually, favouring children from lower-income families.

== Orchestras ==
A large number of orchestras throughout Chile are managed through the Foundation.

=== National youth orchestra ===
The National Youth Symphony Orchestra (OSNJ) (Spanish: Orquesta Sinfónica Nacional Juvenil) is the Foundation's longest-running orchestra, founded in 1994. As the national youth orchestra of Chile, the orchestra has undertaken tours of Europe and also performed in neighbouring country Peru, among numerous national performances. In 2019, the orchestra debuted at Young Euro Classic.

== Achievements ==
Foji claim that their programme reaches more than 12,000 teens and children every year, and their orchestras perform concerts that reach an audience of almost a million.

== See also ==
- Music of Chile
- List of youth orchestras
