= Carmen Luisa Letelier =

Chilean singer and voice teacher

- Born: Carmen Luisa Letelier Valdés
- Education: Pontifical Catholic University
- Occupations: Singer, teacher
- Employer: University of Chile
- Parents: Alfonso Letelier (father); Margarita Valdés Subercaseaux (mother)
- Relatives: Miguel Letelier
- Awards: National Prize for Musical Arts (2010)

Carmen Luisa Letelier Valdés is a Chilean contralto and voice teacher, the winner of the National Prize for Musical Arts in 2010.

== Biography ==
Carmen Luisa Letelier is the daughter of composer Alfonso Letelier and artist Margarita Valdés Subercaseaux. She and her brother Miguel were influenced by their parents to take an interest in music.

Letelier studied pedagogy at the Pontifical Catholic University of Chile, where she graduated as a teacher in 1967. In 1979 she obtained her title of superior interpreter in singing at the Faculty of Arts of the University of Chile. There she was a student of Lila Cerda, Elvira Savi, Federico Heinlein, Clara Oyuela, and Hernán Wurth.

Letelier began her career as a teacher in 1969, at the Pontifical Catholic University's Institute of Music. After almost ten years, she moved to the Department of Music and Sonology at the University of Chile. In 1980 she was appointed a full professor at that university.

Throughout her musical career, she has been linked to various institutions. In 1969 she joined the Ensemble of Ancient Music, a group created by Sylvia Soublette and Juana Subercaseaux at the Pontifical Catholic University. She has also collaborated with the Municipal Theatre of Santiago, the Domingo Santa Cruz Cultural and Artistic Extension Center, and the Isidora Zegers Salon of the Faculty of the University of Chile.

In September 2010, she won the Chilean National Prize for Musical Arts, becoming the third member of her family to do so. Her father won the National Art Prize (with a mention in music) in 1968, while her brother received the National Prize for Musical Arts in 2008.

In December 2018 she succeeded Luis Merino Montero as president of the Chilean Academy of Fine Arts.
