= Los Huasos Quincheros =

Chilean folk music band

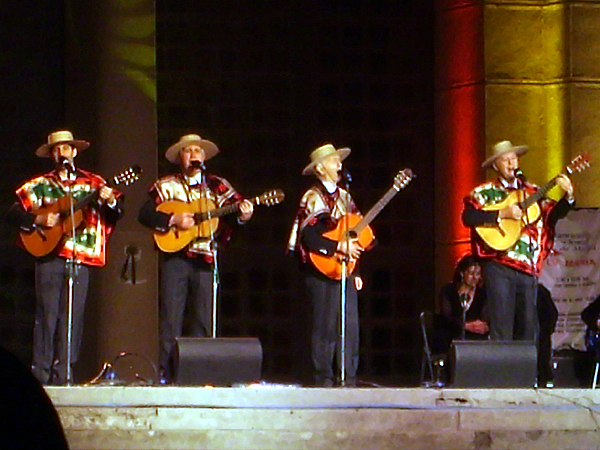
- Live concert by Los Huasos Quincheros in 2007

Background information
- Origin: Chile
- Genres: Chilean folk music, bolero
- Years active: 1937–present
- Members: Benjamín Mackenna, Antonio Antoncich, Ricardo Videla, Cristián O'Ryan,
- Website: http://www.quincheros.cl

Los Huasos Quincheros (also known as Los Quincheros) are a popular Chilean folk musical group, first formed in 1937. It currently consists of the musicians Antonio Antoncich, Jose Vicente Leon and Rafael Prieto. The group was nominated for an International Music Prize in 1970.

== History ==
The original group was formed in April 1937 by Carlos Morgan, the brothers Pedro and Ernesto Amenábar, and Mario Besoaín. The four friends, who at the time were students at the Pontificia Universidad Católica de Chile in Santiago, styled themselves as Los Quincheros; in English their name means "those who use the quincha," a construction of wood and cane used to contain the livestock during a rodeo. From 1937 to 1957 the name of the group was simply Los Quincheros. In 1939, when they had been performing on Radio Agricultura for 5 years, they began calling themselves Los Huasos Nuevos ('The New Cowboys') because they had replaced Los Cuatro Huasos (Raúl Velasco's old group), whose former members became affectionately known as Los Huasos Viejos ('The Old Cowboys'). In 1957, Hernán Velasco and Aníbal Ortúzar left Los Quincheros, with the opinion that the group ought to disband. Carlos Morgan and Jorge Montaldo decided to continue at any cost the traditions already established by Los Quincheros. They invited Alfredo Sauvalle and Gerardo Ríos to join them. In 1958, a lawsuit brought by the three musicians who had left prohibited the group from using the name Los Quincheros. It was at this point that the group adopted the name Los Huasos Quincheros, a combination of the group's predecessors' names.

Through its history the group has had nineteen members, most of them professionals in other areas. These have included the brothers Hernán and Raúl Velasco (who had previously founded Los Cuatro Huasos, another music group), Aníbal Ortúzar, Javier Campos, Jorge Montaldo (lead vocalist from 1952 until he left in 1965 to form another group, Voces de Tierralarga), brothers Sergio and Alfredo Sauvalle and Héctor Inostroza.

The group has toured America, Asia, Europe and Oceania, and has received recognition from the Organisation of American States and IMC-UNESCO. In February 2007 the group celebrated their '70th Anniversary Gala' in the Teatro Municipal in Viña del Mar. In March 2013 they were nominated for the 'Premio a la Música Presidente de la República', a highly regarded Chilean music award, in the folk category. From 1937 to 1957 the name of the group was simply Los Quincheros.

Nowadays the group uses both names, Los Huasos Quincheros and Los Quincheros, which has led to some confusion. Generally, they seem to use the name Los Quincheros when they sing boleros, usually dressed in suits, and Los Huasos Quincheros when they sing folk music, often dressed as huasos. For this reason, the original Quincheros of 1937–57 are often called Los Quincheros del Recuerdo (literally 'The Quincheros of memory').

According to the Chilean National Institute of Industrial Property (INAPI), the name Los Huasos Quincheros is currently registered to Carlos Mackenna, Patricio Reyes, Antonia Antoncich and José Videla.

The current iteration of the group performs throughout Chile, mostly at agricultural events. In June 2013, their album 75 años ('75 Years') sold over 15,000 copies in Chile, making it the eighth-highest-selling Chilean album sold in physical format of the 21st century.

In addition, there was Los Quincheros del Ayer ("The Quincheros of Yesterday"), a spin-off group created by Carlos Morgan, Hernán Velasco, Aníbal Ortúzar, and Javier Campos when they decided to reunite in the 1960s to record new material.

== Political participation during the military dictatorship (1973–1990) ==
In February 1973, during their performance at the Viña del Mar International Song Festival, the group was booed strongly by a large part of the public, while the other half applauded wildly, practically starting a battle in the stands. After 11 September 1973 the group quickly began to represent the military dictatorship, including performing at the request of Augusto Pinochet at the opening of the German World Cup in 1974. Benjamin Mackenna, was appointed Minister of Education in the late 1970s and held the position through the first few years of the 1980s. During the campaigning for the 1988 plebiscite, the members of the group openly supported the "Yes" option, which supported the continuation of the regime.

== Achievements ==
- 1955 – Tour of New York City and Miami, United States. Performed at the Waldorf Astoria hotel, New York.
- 1956 – Tour of Central America. Opened 'T.V. Dominicana'.
- 1957 – Performed in Miami at the Festival of the Americas, and on Cuban television.
- 1959 – Performed on the Dinah Shore Show. Held shows in Peru. Televised performance at Pacific Fair.
- 1963 – Won 1st and 2nd places in the folk section of the fourth Viña del Mar International Song Festival with the songs Álamo huacho ('Poplar Orphan') written by Clara Solovera, and Guitarra cuerpo de china ('Guitar made of china') by Carlos Vera Ramírez.
- 1964 – Won 1st and 2nd places in the folk section of the fifth Viña del Mar International Song Festival with the songs Qué bonita va ('How beautiful') by Francisco 'Pancho' Flores del Campo, and El caracol y la rosa ('The snail and the rose') by Jaime Atria. Named Best Latin American Group by Latin American Institute, Hollywood.
- 1970 – Won a prize at EXPO-OSAKA (Japan). Honoured by the Mayor of Miami. Awarded Diploma of Honour from the Organisation of American States. Nominated for IMC-UNESCO International Music Prize.
- 1990 – 1 million discs sold with EMI-Odeon, London. Awarded Medal of Santiago, Ilustre Municipalidad de Santiago. Awarded Medal of Honour, Pontifical Catholic University of Chile.
- 2000 – First place in folk section of forty-first Viña del Mar International Song Festival with the song El corralero ('He of the corral'), by Sergio Sauvalle. This was the third time they had won the folk section of the festival.
- 2012 – Prize to the Music: President of the Republic, Category Folk music.

== Members ==
- Carlos Morgan, voice and guitar (1937–1965)
- Mario Besoaín, voice and guitar (1937–1938)
- Ernesto Amenábar, voice and guitar (1937–1941)
- Pedro Amenábar, voice and guitar (1937–1942)
- Hernán Velasco, voice and guitar (1938–1956)
- Raúl Velasco, voice and guitar (1941–1944)
- Javier Campos, voice and guitar (1942–1952)
- Aníbal Ortúzar, voice and guitar (1944–1956)
- Jorge Montaldo, voice and guitar (1952–1965)
- Gerardo Ríos, voice and guitar (1956–1958)
- Alfredo Sauvalle, voice and guitar (1957–1960, 1965–1994)
- Benjamín Mackenna, voice and guitar (1958–2018)
- Sergio Sauvalle, voice and guitar (1960–1967, 1995–2005)
- Ricardo Videla, voice and guitar (1965–2018)
- Eduardo Riesco, voice and guitar (1966–1975)
- Patricio Reyes, voice and guitar (1975–1986, 1994–2010)
- Héctor Inostroza, voice and guitar (1986–1994)
- Antonio Antoncich, voice and guitar (2005–present)
- Rodrigo Zegers, voice and guitar (2010–2014)
- Cristián O'Ryan, voice and guitar (2014–2021)
- José Vicente Muñoz, voice and guitar (2018–present)
- Enrique Barros, voice and guitar (2018–2022)
- Rafael Prieto, voice and guitar (2022–present)

== Discography ==
- Chile Canta (1959)
- Recuerdo de Chile (Souvenir of Chile) (1960)
- Tonadita Chilena (1961)
- Canciones de América Morena (1961)
- Nosotros (1961)
- De Mañanita (1963)
- De La Cordillera Vengo (1964)
- "Chile Canta"(1964
- "Boleros de todos los tiempos" (1964)
- Voces de tradición (1965)
- Micelaneos (1966)
- Chile en una tonada (1967)
- Nicanor Molinare (1968)
- Las tonadas del recuerdo (1968)
- "Chile Lindo, canciones de Clara Solovera" (1968)
- "Los Huasos Quincheros" (1969)
- "En vivo" (1970)
- "33 años de canto" (1970)
- Si vas para Chile (1970)
- Las canciones de Pancho Flores (1971)
- "Boleros para enamorar" (1971)
- Soy de la Caballería (1973)
- "Los Huasos Quincheros Internacionales" (1973)
- "Andanzas de cuatro guitarra" (1973)
- "A don Manuel" (1974)
- "Los Quincheros" (1975)
- "Cien años y una canción" (1975)
- Las memorias de patito (1977)
- "Desde Chile" (1977)
- "Chile un país para quedarse" (1977)
- "Quincheros y el amor" (1979)
- "Noche Callada, Nosotros, sin un amor" (1979)
- "Chile, en voces de Los Huasos Quincheros" (1979)
- "Auténtico Folklore Chileno" (1980)
- "Chile lindo y otros éxitos" (1982)
- "Chile" (1998)
- "Siempre románticos" (1999)
- "El Corralero" (2000)
- "Sesión en Vivo, Quincheros románticos" (2003)
- "Sesión en Vivo, Quincheros" (2003)
- "Colección Inmortales" (2004)
- "Colección 70 años Quincheros" (2007)
- Bicentenario (2010)
- "Grandes Éxitos" (2011)
- "Quincheros en navidad" (2012)
- "Mi Historia, 75 años Éxitos románticos" (2012)
- "Grandes del folklore, 75 años" (2012)
- "Antología de colección" (2013)
- "Padres del Folklore" (2014)
- "El Cantar Quinchero" (2015)
- "Quincheros, Cantos del patrimonio religioso nacional" (2016)

== International Performances ==
- 1943 – They are presented as star performers on "El Mundo de Buenos Aires radio".
- 1955 – Nueva York and Miami Tour, United States. Invited to RCA and performed at the Waldorf Astoria, New York.
- 1956 – Central America tour: Cuba, Panama and Inaugurate Dominican Republic T.V.
- 1957 – Performances in Miami, Festival of the Americas, and for Cuba T.V.
- 1960 – Hollywood – Dinah Shore Show and Performances in Perú (Pacific Fair)
- 1966 – 60-day tour for ex-Soviet Unión; Performances in Spain, Germany and Italy.
- 1967 – Performances on the final voyage of RMS Queen Mary Southampton to Long Beach via Cape Horn.
- 1970 – International Fair of Lausanne, Switzerland; International Fair of Osaka, Japan.
- 1972 – Performances on the cruise of SS France, Valparaiso to Tahiti.
- 1974 – Germany, Frankfurt, Inauguration of the World Cup and action for Eurovision.
- 1977 – Washington, D.C. Constitution Hall.
- 1977 – Rio de Janeiro and Brasilia, TV Shows.
- 1980 – Performance at Metropolitan Opera House, New York.
- 1980 – Puerto Rico, Channel 12 TV and acting with Nidia Caro in the municipal theater.
- 1982 – Action for the OAS in the Hall of the Americas, Washington.
- 1985 – Washington, D.C. Concert at the Kennedy Center.
- 1987 – Tour of USA, 10 cities celebrating 50 years of singing.
- 1995 – Performances in the Chilean Antarctic.
- 1997 – The Vatican, invited by S.S. John Paul II to participate in the Christmas concert.
- 2010 – Spain, Fair of the Americas.
- 2012 – Spain, Feria del Enganche (Seville).
- 2012 – Tour East, China and Korea.
