= Livre d'orgue (Messiaen) =

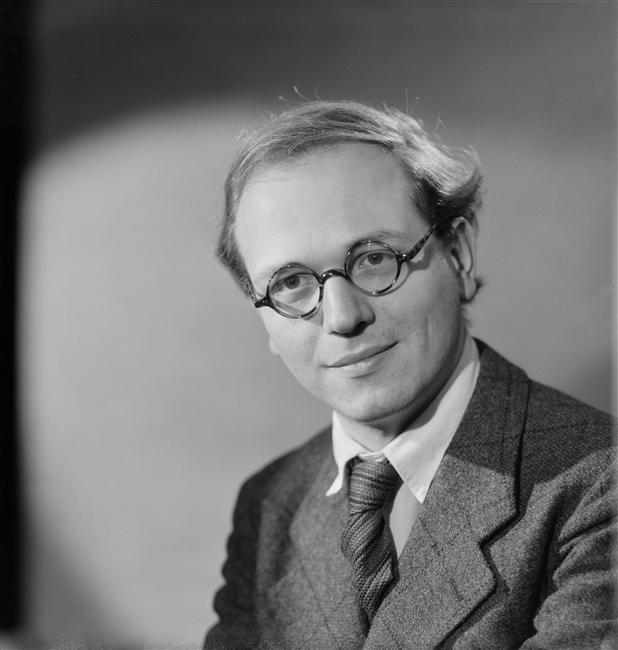
Olivier Messiaen in 1937

Livre d'orgue ("Organ book") is a work for organ by the French composer Olivier Messiaen, composed in 1951–52. A major work of Messiaen, its place in Messiaen's output can be compared to that of Bach's The Art of Fugue.

According to Messiaen, different parts of the work were composed in different places, influencing their form: "Reprise par interversion", "Pièce en trio I", and "Les yeux dans les roues" were composed in Paris; "Les mains dans l'abîme", "Pièce en trio II", and "Soixante-quatre durées" were composed in the Alps; and "Chant d'oiseaux" was composed in the forest of Saint-Germain.

A more detailed chronology is given by Vincent Benitez (2017, 289): movements 1, 2, and 6 were composed in Paris in 1951–52; movement 3 was composed in the Dauphiné mountains and the vallée de la Romanche in 1951; movement 4 was begun at the Perrin de Fuligny meadow in the forest of Saint-Germain-en-Laye in 1951 and completed the following year at the branderaie de Gardépée, Charente; movement 5 was composed in front of the glacier of Le Râteau and the Tabuchet glacier on Meije in 1951; movement 7 was also composed in 1951, at the champs de Petichet.

== Structure ==
The work comprises seven movements:

1. "Reprise par interversion" (Permuted repeats)
2. "Pièce en trio I" (First trio)
3. "Les mains de l'abîme" (The hands of the abyss)
4. "Chants d'oiseaux" (Bird songs)
5. "Pièce en trio II" (Second trio)
6. "Les yeux dans les roues" (The eyes on the wheels)
7. "Soixante-quatre durées" (64 durations)

== Premiere ==
The piece was premiered by Messiaen himself in 1952 for the inauguration of the organ in the Villa Berg in Stuttgart (Gillock 2010, 162), though another source gives the date as 23 April 1953 (Benitez 2017, 289). He later gave the French premiere on 21 March 1955 at the Sainte-Trinité in Paris, as part of the second season of Pierre Boulez's Concerts du Domaine musical—the only time the Domaine musical put on a concert in a church (Hill and Simeone 2007, 18). This performance, for which Boulez only prepared for around 50 people, was notable due to a considerably larger crowd arrived, blocking Messiaen's entrance to the church. (Hill and Simeone 2007, 202)
