= Calatambo Albarracín =

Chilean composer and folklorist (1924–2018)

Background information
- Birth name: Calatambo Albarracín
- Born: September 21, 1924; Santa Laura, Tarapacá Region, Chile
- Died: September 5, 2018 (aged 93); Santiago, Chile
- Genres: Chilean folk
- Occupation(s): Composer, folklorist

Calatambo Albarracín (September 21, 1924 – September 5, 2018), born Freddy Albarracín Iribarren, was a Chilean composer and folklorist identified with the music of northern Chile.

He was born in 1924 in Santa Laura in Chile's Tarapacá Region, an area known for nitrate mining. He began composing at age 16 and moved to Santiago in the early 1950s.He worked to popularize the musical rhythms and instruments of northern Chile, including zampoñas, pusas, sikus, quenas, sikuris and lichiguayas. He also performed and recorded with his group, Los Calicheros de Sierra Pampa.

His notable compositions include "Trote Tarapaqueño”, "Navidad del desierto", "El huachitorito", “El cachimbo de Tarapacá”, “Caliche”, “Camanchaca”, “Adiós Salitrera Victoria”, “Tamarugal”, “Cueca San Lorenzo” and “La Tirana chica”.

In 2012, he was the recipient of the fundamental figures of Chilean music award. In 1998, he also received the annual award of the Chilean Union of Folklorists and Guitarists. He died in 2018 at age 93.
