= Si vas para Chile =

Chilean Waltz

- Waltz by Chito Faró
- English: If You Go to Chile
- Language: Spanish
- Composed: 1942

Si vas para Chile (transl. 'If you go to Chile') is a waltz composed by the Chilean musician Chito Faró, stage name for Enrique Motto Arenas, in 1942. It is one of the most popular songs in Chilean music and it has been covered by many artists, including Los Huasos Quincheros and Los Cuatro Cuartos.

== Lyrics ==
The song takes the form of a conversation between a Chilean living abroad and a person who is going to visit Chile. The Chilean asks the traveler to visit the woman he loves to express his feelings from afar. He gives directions to arrive at his beloved's home, describing in the process characteristics of Chile's Central Valley: willows alongside streams, the Andes mountain range and the townspeople.

The closing line of the song is one of the most recorded in Chilean popular music: "In Chile, you'll see how well they treat friends from abroad." ("Y verás como quieren en Chile al amigo cuando es forastero"). This line is often cited ironically to highlight Chilean's friendliness towards foreigners and immigrants.

The lyrics describe a small town called initially Los Andes, later changed to Las Condes. Si vas para Chile was composed by Chito Faró during his time in Buenos Aires, Argentina. Faró tried to sell the song to authorities in Los Andes, but without success. The mayor of Las Condes, Raúl Matas, was interested and Faró changed the name of the town in the song from Los Andes to Las Condes.Las Condes was at the time an agricultural area to the east of de Santiago, Chile. Years later, this area was urbanized and is now part of the Santiago Metropolitan Region.

== See also ==
- Music of Chile
