= Ester Soré =

Chilean singer (1915–1996)

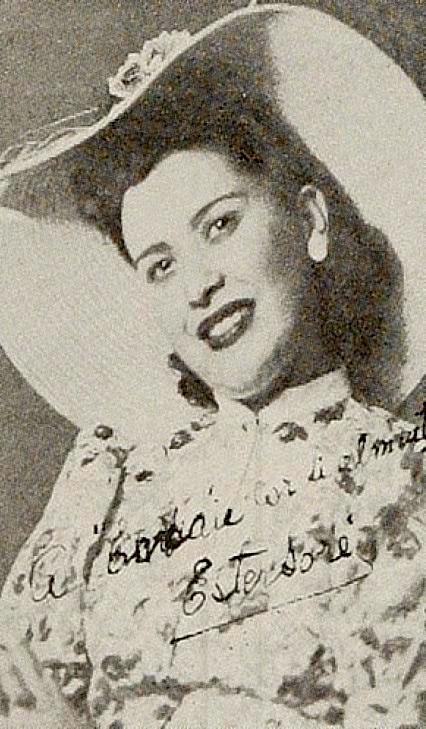
Ester Soré

Ester Soré (born Marta Yupanqui Donoso, 27 May 1915 – 6 September 1996) was the main singer of Chilean melodies of the 20th century. She recorded for the first time, the successful one "Chile Lindo" ("Pretty Chile"), of Clara Solovera, and did not only contribute to enriching the way to interpret those songs thanks to a voice recognized among the clearest and expressive of her time. Besides she was a popular artist in an extensive sense: on the radio, recordings, tours and movies (El amor que pasa (1947), Dos corazones y una tonada (1939) and Bar Antofagasta (1942)).
