= Vicente Bianchi =

Chilean musical artist (1920–2018)

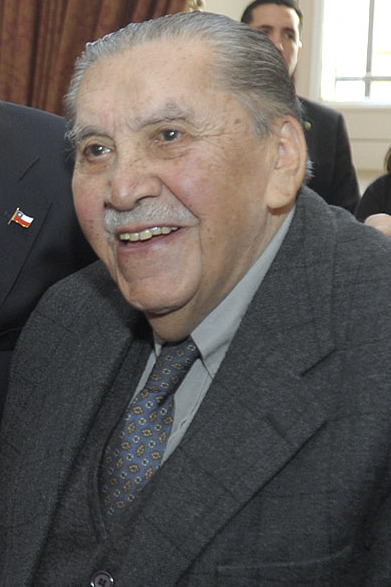
- Bianchi in 2012

Background information
- Birth name: Vicente Bianchi Alarcón
- Born: January 27, 1920; Ñuñoa, Chile
- Origin: Chile
- Died: September 24, 2018 (aged 98); La Reina, Chile
- Occupation(s): Composer, pianist, conductor
- Years active: 1930–2018

Vicente Bianchi Alarcón (January 27, 1920 – September 24, 2018) was a Chilean composer, pianist, conductor, and orchestra and choir director. He received the Premio Nacional de Artes Musicales de Chile in 2016. He is remembered for composing music to accompany the poems of Pablo Neruda, and for his liturgical music, including the Chilean Mass (composed in 1964) and the Te Deum (1970–2000).
