= Luis Orlandini =

Chilean guitarist and professor (b. 1964)

- Born: 1964; Chile
- Genres: Chamber music
- Occupation: Guitarist

Luis Orlandini (born 1964) is a Chilean guitarist and professor at the University of Chile and the Pontifical Catholic University of Chile.

== Life ==
Orlandini studied guitar with Ernesto Quezada at the University of Chile and then with Eliot Fisk at the School of Music of Cologne. In 1989, he obtained First Place at the ARD International Music Competition in Munich, thus initiating an international career that has led him to perform in various countries and record with different European labels.

He performs mainly as a soloist, but has also played with groups of different natures of chamber music, one of the most important being the Orellana Orlandini Duo. He has also participated in orchestral works, under the baton of various conductors of different nationalities. He has contributed to the development and public knowledge of Chilean music, having premiered more than 40 works by Chilean composers, many of them composed by his own commission.

In 1996, Orlandini received both the Critic's Award and the Lifetime Achievement Award, granted by the Art Critics Circle of Chile and the Chilean Copyright Society, respectively.
