= Margot Loyola =

Chilean musician and educator (1918–2015)

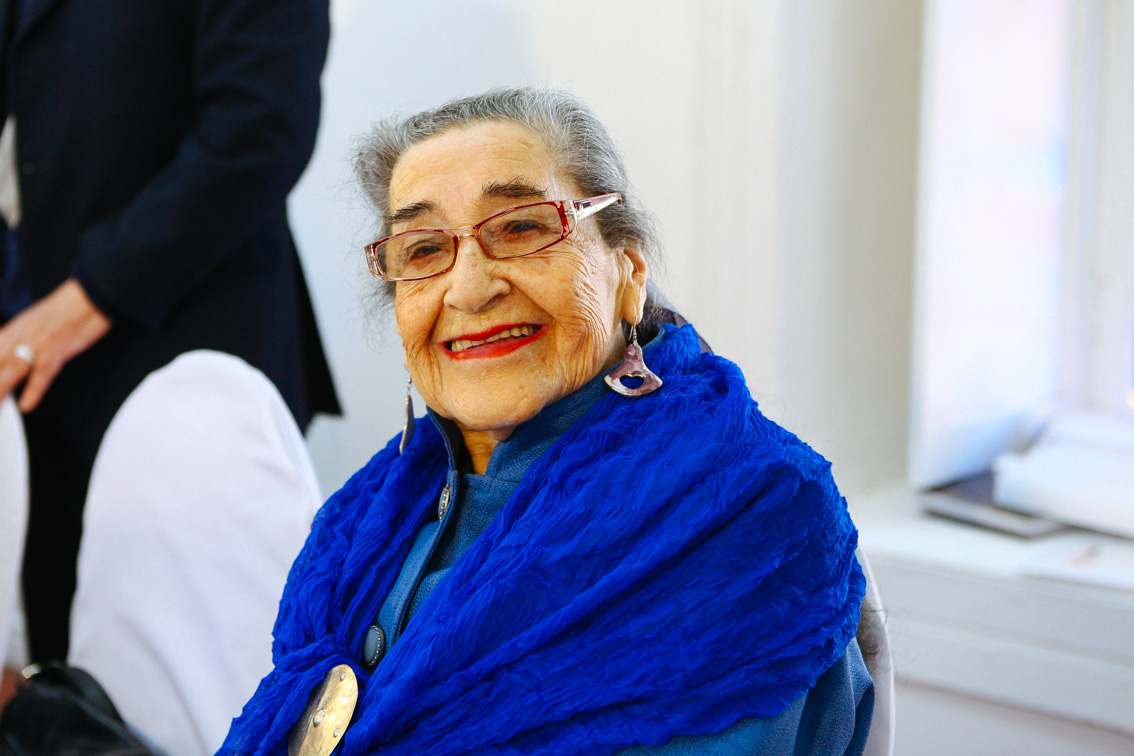
Margot Loyola in 2013

Margot Loyola Palacios (September 15, 1918 – August 3, 2015) was a Chilean folklorist, musician, dancer, and teacher. She is considered one of the most influential musicians of Chile, pioneering folkloric research and transforming traditional music education and performance.

Loyola was active as a folklorist, performer, and educator from the 1940s until her death in 2015. She published a large body of work dealing with the folk music and dances of all Chilean regions, most notably on the cueca and tonada.

== Early career ==
Loyola was born in Linares, Chile on September 15, 1918 to Recaredo Loyola and Ana María Palacios. She studied piano with Rosita Renard and Elisa Gayán at the National Conservatory of Music of Chile, and studied voice with the opera singer Blanca Hauser. In 1936 the National Conservatory's director, Armando Carvajal, invited Margot to begin collecting folk music in the rural areas surrounding Santiago. She and her sister, Estela Loyola, performed as the sister duo Las Hermanas Loyola throughout the 1940s, singing and playing guitar for a range of traditional Chilean genres, including the cueca, tonada, and waltzes. During this time, she also composed songs with friend and poet Cristina Miranda.

In the 1950s, after the separation of Las Hermanas Loyola, Margot began studying with folklorists and musicians across Latin America, including Carlos Vega in Argentina, Lauro Ayestarán in Uruguay, and José Maria Arguedas in Peru. She began teaching folk music and dance at the Escuelas de temporada (seasonal schools) across Chile, teaching hundreds of students how to dance cueca. Folkloric groups such as Conjunto Cuncumén began as a direct result of these schools, positioning Loyola as a musical influence on musicians such as Víctor Jara and Rolando Alarcón and the Chilean nueva canción movement, albeit somewhat indirectly. She also developed a friendship with folklorist and composer Violeta Parra, who she called her "comadre," during this season.

Loyola researched the folklore and traditional musical styles of all the regions of Chile as well as Easter Island (a Chilean province, located in the south Pacific Ocean). In 1952, she began her research on the ceremonial dances of the Chilean north, with Rogelia Perez and other dance groups at La Tirana. She also conducted research traditional dances on the southern island of Chiloé.

== Legacy and recognition ==
Loyola's students have moved into top positions as folklorists, instructors, and university professors in Chile. Her student and eventual husband, Osvaldo Cádiz, began the conjunto folklórico (folkloric ensemble) Palomar in 1962 under the name Conjunto de Margot Loyola. The conjunto folklórico, still active today, staged Loyola's research through music and dance performances. Towards the end of her life, she taught younger generations of artists who sought her out for study. These musicians include Natalia Contesse, Andrea Andreu, Gepe, Claudia "Belencha" Mena and Patricia Díaz of El Parcito, Paola Lucero, and Camilo Leiva.

In 1972, Loyola became a professor of the Pontifical Catholic University of Valparaíso, where she began the Conjunto Folklórico PUCV in 1974 at the request of students Carlos Nuñez and Manuel Chamorro. In 1998 she was made a Professor emeritus of the Catholic University of Valparaíso. She was awarded the coveted Chilean National Prize for Musical Arts in 1994, becoming the first woman and first folklorist to win the prize, and the "Premio a lo Chileno" in 2001. She died on August 3, 2015, at the age of 96 in Santiago de Chile.

== Works ==
Loyola's activities resulted in many books, videos, LPs, cassettes and CDs.

=== Bibliography ===
- Bailes de tierra (1980)
- El cachimbo: Danza tarapaqueña de pueblos y quebradas (1994)
- La tonada: Testimonios para el futuro (2006)
- La cueca: Danza de la vida y la muerte (2010)
- 50 danzas tradicionales y populares en Chile (2014)

=== Videography ===
- "Danzas tradicionales de Chile" (Traditional dances of Chile), (1994)
- "La Zamacueca" (1999)
- "Los del Estribo: Cantos y Danzas Populares de Chile", (2001)

=== Discography ===
- 14 LPs, 6 cassettes and 7 CDs, in addition to other editions in various other countries

Solo LPs and EPs

- Margot Loyola et sa guitare (1956)
- Folklore chilien (1957)
- Aires chilenos (1957)
- Canciones folklóricas chilenas (1956)
- Margot Loyola y su guitarra] (1956)
- Selección folklórica
- Isla de Pascua
- Recorriendo Chile
- Salones y chinganas del 900 (1965)
- Casa de canto (1966)
- Villancicos chilenos
- Isla maravillosa (1962)
- El amor y la cueca (1964)
