= Music of Chile =

Music of Chile: Topics
Chilean jazz	Chilean academic music
Chilean nueva ola	Chilean rock
Chilean punk	Chilean heavy metal
Contemporary pop	Chilean folk music
Fusión latinoamericana	Nueva Canción Chilena
Chilean cumbia	New chilean cumbia
Cueca	Payada
Mapuche music	Andean music
History
Festivals	Viña del Mar
National anthem	"Himno Nacional"
South American music
Argentina - Bolivia - Brazil - Colombia - Ecuador - Paraguay - Peru - Uruguay - Venezuela

Chilean music refers to all kinds of music developed in Chile, or by Chileans in other countries, from the arrival of the Spanish conquistadors to the modern day. It also includes the native pre-Columbian music from what is today Chilean territory.

== Music in Chile ==
=== Pre-Columbian and colonial times ===
Distribution of the pre-Hispanic people of Chile

Prior to the arrival of the European conquerors, the modern national borders that make up the Americas did not exist, so one cannot refer to music from "Chile", or any other South American country, from this time. However, music existed in the Americas for centuries before European conquest, and many of the characteristics and instruments of pre-Hispanic music have formed part of the folkloric and musical tradition of Chile and of Latin America. Archaeological excavations have unearthed many musical instruments showing the existence of a variety of musical cultures in the area long before even the Inca period. Scientific research into remains left by the Nazca and Mochica peoples has shown the existence of complex theoretical musical systems, with the presence of minor intervals, semitones, chromaticism and musical scales of five, six, seven and eight notes, equivalent to contemporaneous cultures in Asia and Europe. Sociologist Carlos Keller has compared the Inca occupation of the Andean region with the Roman occupation of Greece or the Aztec conquest of the Maya. Like the Aztecs and Romans, the Incas took the knowledge and traditions of the cultures they found and incorporated them into their own. Inca music was formed by elements of Nazca, Chimú, Colla – Aymara and other cultures. It is also believed that the Incas were the first American people to develop some kind of formal music education.

Atacama people

When the Incas advanced over the north of Chile, they encountered different native peoples and absorbed elements of their culture, especially the Atacameños (Atacama people). The Atacameños - themselves highly influenced by the Nazca - were an organized society that inhabited parts of the Atacama Desert, mainly in the east and central sectors of the region, and spread as far as Central Chile. They were conquered by the Incas in the 15th century, but today still speak and sing some of the ancient songs in cunza, the original language of their people.

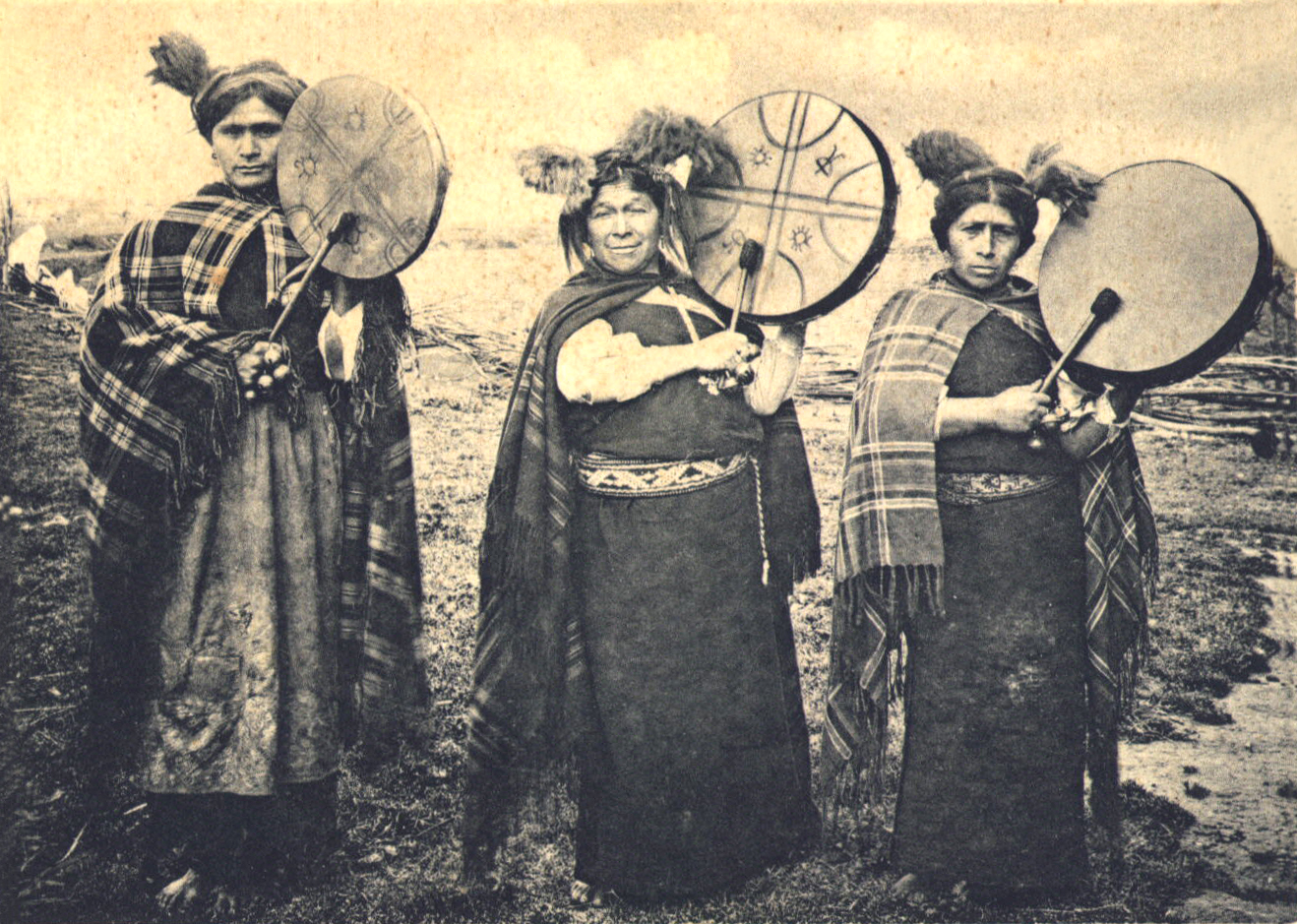
Mapuche Machis with Kultrun, a traditional drum

Mapuche people

The Mapuche people were the main indigenous people populating the region running from Copiapó in the north to Chiloé in the south. The Mapuche were never conquered by the Incas, so their music and musical instruments differ from the northern cultures that fell under Andean influence. Spanish chroniclers observed their musical rituals with interest, and their observations have allowed historians to compare this early music with the Mapuche music of the modern day. Historian Samuel Marti writes that the Mapuche "do not dance or sing to demonstrate knowledge and skill, or to entertain spectators, but to honour their gods". Mapuche music today, despite the influence of Christianity, is still an expression of faith, hopes or fears to the traditional gods, because the conquest did not change the spirit of these peoples, even though it introduced new cultural elements. The Franciscan missionary Geronimo de Ore (Lima, Peru, circa 1598) noted that Mapuche children learned songs from a very young age and demonstrated excellent memory and sense of rhythm. De Ore, realizing that these skills could be used as an evangelization and religious indoctrination tool, proposed that Christian prayers should have been taught in the native language and sung to native or European tunes. The same method was used in Chile by Jesuit priests. Jesuit priest Bernardo Havestadt came to Chile in 1748 and worked as missionary in La Mocha Concepción, Rere and Santa Fe. In 1777, he published a document in Westphalia that contains 19 Mapuche songs accompanied by European-style music. Unlike the Andean peoples, the Mapuches did not develop a theoretical musical system, but in practice one is imposed by the limitations of their instruments. The technique of playing these instruments has been preserved from generation to generation and melodies are formed by linking periods. There are no long notes in Mapuche music and the scales and melodic schemes of their music have no relation to the panphonic Andean music. In the seventeenth century, chronicler Gonzalez de Najera described the music as "more sad than happy" and the instruments as basic drums and flutes made of the shin bones of Spaniards and other native enemies. Other chroniclers agreed with Gonzalez de Naveja's observations, including the jesuit Juan Ignacio Molina (Abate Molina).

Mapuche musical instruments

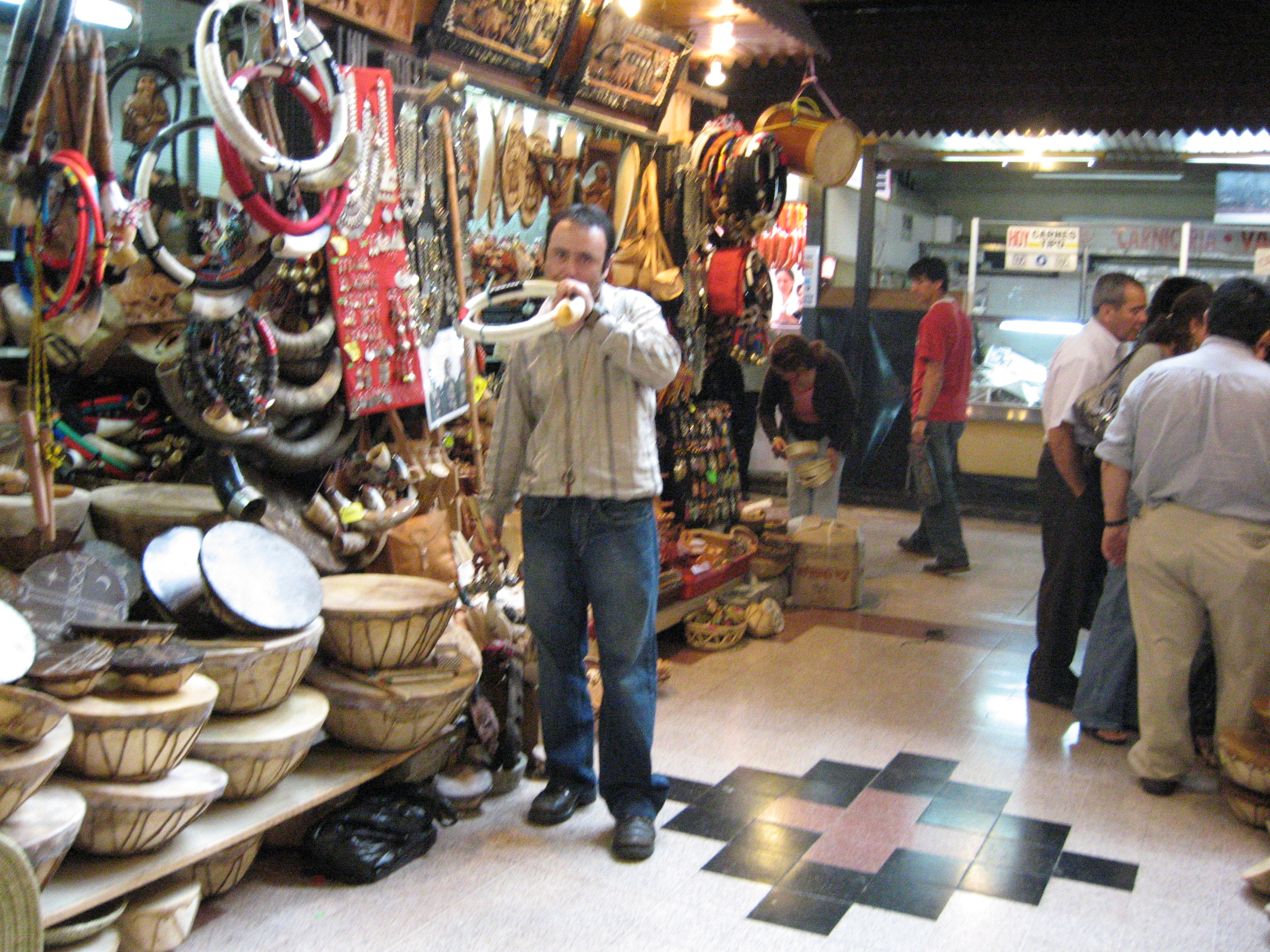
Market stall selling trutrucas and kultrunes along with other Mapuche craft items (individual is playing a trutruca)

wind instruments include: Trutruca, or trutruka: a kind of trumpet, straight or spiral-shaped, made of colihue wood (Chusquea culeou) with a terminal or lateral mouthpiece and a cattle horn to amplify the sound.

similar to the trutruca but smaller, made of ñolkin cane, a native plant species.

Pingkullwe: a transverse flute with 5 holes, made of colihue wood (Chusquea culeou). Pifüllka or : a vertical flute with a closed end, made of wood and played in pairs. Kull kull: a small trumpet made of bull horn.

Of the string instruments, the best known is the Kunkulkawe, known in other cultures as the Pawpaweñ, Latajkiaswole, or Alenta-Ji-Wole. It consists of a bow that is rubbed against another bow, with some chroniclers also describing a mouth bow.

Membranophone instruments include the Makawa, or kakel kultrung, a double-headed drum; and the Kultrun or Cultrun, a ceremonial drum and the most important musical instrument in Mapuche culture, used by the machi (healer or sorcerer) for religious and cultural rituals.

Idiophone instruments include the Kadkawilla or, a leather strap with jingle bells attached, which is played alongside the Cultrun; and the Wada or Huada, a rattle made of a pumpkin filled with small pebbles or seeds.

Fueguinos

Music in the southernmost regions of modern Chile was produced by the Fueguino peoples, native inhabitants of Tierra del Fuego, including the Onas, the Yaganes, the Yamanas and the Alacalufes). The Fueginos caught the attention of explorers in the early of the twentieth century, with North American Colonel Charles Wellington Furlong the first to record phonograph records of Selkʼnam and Yagan songs between 1907 and 1908. German priest and ethnologist Martin Gusinde studied and recorded their music, and in a letter from July 23, 1923, wrote of ceremonies with music and dancing very similar to those observed in the Amazon, which he described as sad, solemn and very limited in tonal range.

== Development of music in Chile ==
Chilean music is closely related with Chile's history and geography. The landscape, climate and lifestyle vary greatly from north to south and have a deep impact on cultural traditions. Popular music in the colonial period and during the struggle for independence was highly influenced by military bands and by the church. There were few musical instruments and very little opportunity to learn to play an instrument outside of military bands or churches if you were not from a wealthy family.

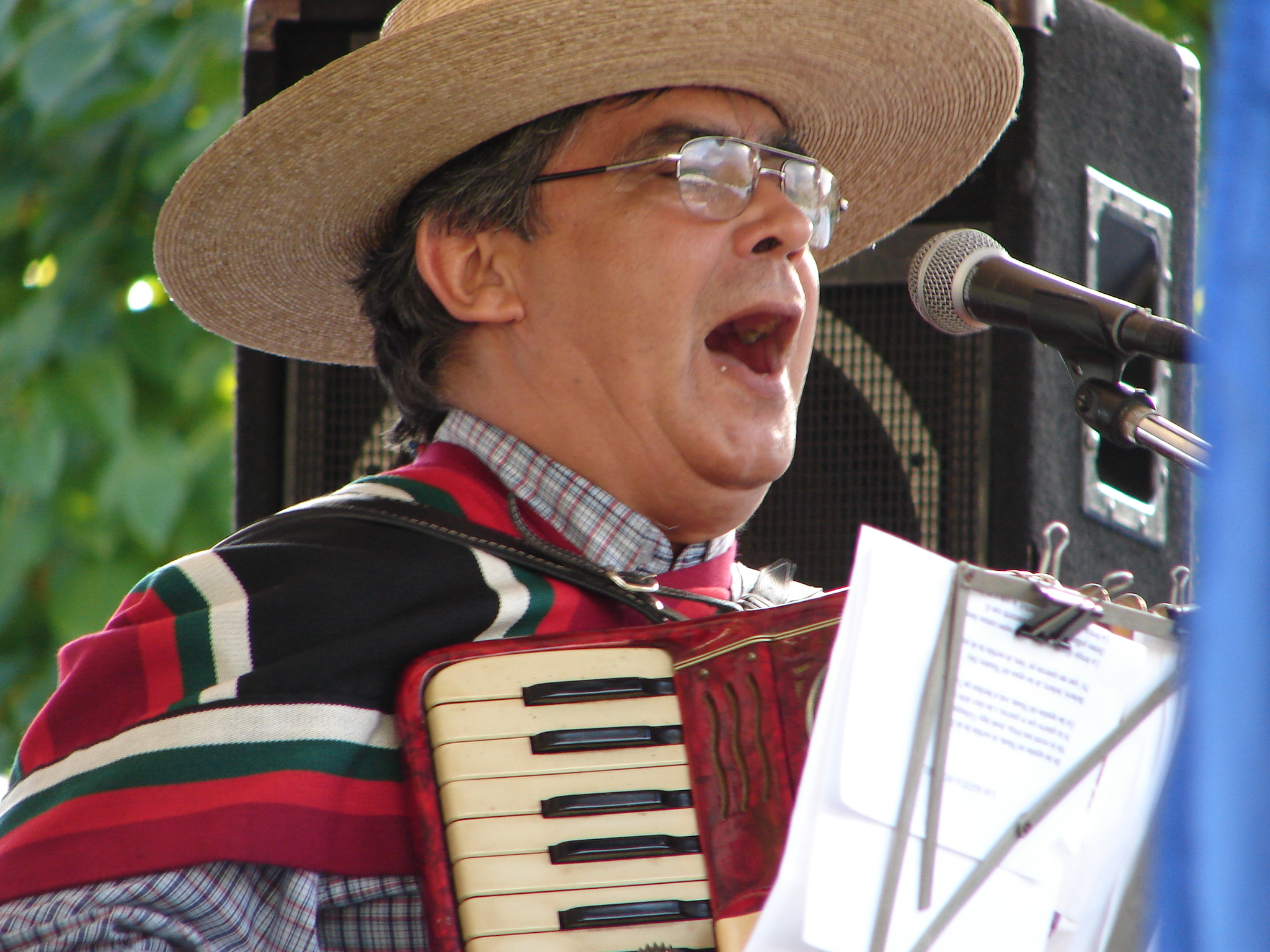
Chilean huaso playing accordion

=== Nineteenth century ===
In the nineteenth century, with the end of the colonial period and the transition to an independent republic, music and other aspects of culture gradually began to acquire a national identity.

During the first years of the republic, most of the leading musicians came from abroad. In 1823, a wave of professional musicians came to Chile, including: Bartolome Filomeno and José Bernardo Alzedo from Lima, Peru; Juan Crisóstomo Lafinur from Córdoba, Argentina; and the Spaniard Isidora Zegers, one of the most important figures of Chilean music of this period. Having studied the harp, guitar, piano and singing with Federico Massimino in Europe, Isidora's superior musical knowledge was welcomed in the Chilean Tertulias (social gatherings of the wealthy, like a salon). She formally contributed to the development of Chilean music when she helped found both the first National Conservatory of Music and the Academy of Music in 1852. Some of the first opera and ballet performances in Chile also took place around this time.

By the end of the nineteenth century, musical clubs and other private organisations had sprung up in Santiago, Concepción, Valparaíso, Valdivia and other cities, including: "Club Musical de Santiago" (Santiago, 1871), "Sociedad Musical Reformada" (Valparaíso, 1881), "Deutscher Verein" (1853) and "Club de la Union" (Valdivia, 1879), "Sociedad de Musical Clasica" (Santiago, 1879), and "Sociedad Cuarteto" (Santiago, 1885).

Some of the leading Chilean composers of the twentieth century were born at the end of the nineteenth century, including: Celerino Pereira Lecaros (1874), Prospero Bisquertt (1881), Carlos Lavín (1883), Javier Rengifo (1884), Alfonso Leng (1884), Enrique Soro Barriga (1884), Pedro Humberto Allende (1885), Carlos Isamitt (1887), Acario Cotapos Baeza (1889), Armando Carvajal (1893), Samuel Negrete (1893), Roberto Puelma (1893), Juan Casanova Vicuña (1894) and Domingo Santa Cruz (1899).

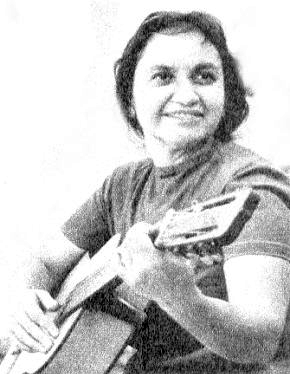
Violeta Parra, an icon of Chilean folklore

=== Twentieth century ===
By the twentieth century Chile had established its own musical scene, but, as in most of the American countries, the national identity had struggled to assert itself in a world where European styles were still dominant. Composer says of the influence of European styles: "The young American music is hill from aesthetic elements that hasn't been digested". This had led to an almost complete disregard for native folklore and tradition.

From 1900 onwards, music began to take a more central place in Chilean society. The first Chilean recording label, Fonografía Artística (which produced both cylinders and discs), began its functions in Santiago around 1908. In 1912 the "Orchestral Society of Chile" was created and, over the next year, performed the nine symphonies of Beethoven, published the journal "La Orquesta" (The Orchestra), and debuted performances of Bach. Influential families began to cultivate music and take part in the creation of music appreciation societies. Once these influential families got involved in the music scene, musicians' reputation in society started to change - previously seen as undesirable, they become to be viewed as an important part of culture, and having musical knowledge became essential for the cultured person. Around 1928, the Bach Society, a civil organization of musicians and intellectuals, began to harshly criticize formal music education in Chile, especially at the "Conservatorio nacional" (National Conservatory). The society claimed that the number of students admitted to the conservatory was excessive and that the conservatory lacked long term planning, and criticised the cult of Italian opera as "retrograde". The Ministry of Education set up a commission to look at reforming the organization, which eventually led to a new stage in the development of music in Chile, with the creation of organizations dedicated to creating music, teaching music and supporting musicians and composers. Another institution that contributed to the development of music in Chile was the Universidad de Chile (University of Chile), when it created its High Arts Faculty in 1929. But even in 1802, long before the creation of the High Arts Faculty, there had been efforts within the institution to take the music culture and teaching to a highest level. In 1802, a group of professors from San Felipe University (which would later become the University of Chile) agreed that any teaching of music in their institution should be based not on the skills of musicians or the quality of a singer's voice, but instead on scientific and mathematical principles. The creation of the High Arts Faculty had an immediate effect. Soon after, a library was founded, a collection of albums produced, and several contests and activities held to promote Chilean musicians and composers. The second half of the twentieth century saw many events and new institutions that contributed to the development of music in Chile, such as: The creation of the "Instituto de extencion musical", in 1940, which went on to found the (Chilean Symphonic Orchestra) in 1941, and the "Revista Musical Chilena" (Chilean Music Journal) in 1945. The creation of the "Instituto de investigacion folklorica" (the Institute of Folkloric Research) in 1943, which would become the "Instituto de investigacion musical" (Institute of Music Research). The institute would become very active in promoting Chilean music, sponsoring and funding many Chilean musicians and composers. In 1948, the High Arts Faculty split into a music and an art faculty, allowing both institutions to grow. The creation of the "Orquesta filarmonica de Chile" (Chilean Philharmonic Orchestra) in 1955, which later changed its name to "Orquesta filarmonica municipal" (Municipal Philharmonic Orchestra). Also in 1955, the "Taller experimental del sonido" (Experimental Sound Laboratory) was set up in the "Universidad Catolica de Santiago" (Catholic University of Santiago). Following a visit to Chile by physicist Werner Meyer-Eppler in 1958, experimentation with electronic music got scientific support and work began on an electronic music laboratory. The "Departamento de música" (Music Department) at the "Universidad Catolica de Santiago" (Catholic University of Santiago) was created in 1959. The university already had an Institute of Music and a chamber orchestra, and also recorded and released music albums. In the same year, Jose Visencio Asuar published a thesis entitled "Generación mecánica y electrónica del sonido musical" (Mechanical and Electronic Generation of Musical Sound), and to demonstrate his thesis he composed "Variaciones espectrales" (Spectral Variations), the first piece of electronic music in Chile. In the 1960s, the trend continued and several institutions dedicated to promoting music were set up throughout the country, including the "Asociación de Coros de Tarapaca" (Tarapaca Choirs Association) in the Tarapacá Region and the "Orquesta de la Universidad Austral de Valdivia" (Austral University of Valdivia Orchestra). This university and its music conservatory have made a great contribution to music in the south of Chile

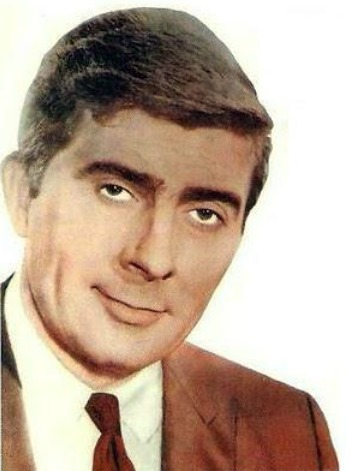
Antonio Prieto scored an international 1961 hit with "La novia", mostly known in English-speaking countries as "The Wedding".

1961 saw the launch of the "Folkloric Weeks", an event organized by the Institute of Music Research. The same year, the "Orquesta Clásica Pro Música de Viña del Mar" (Viña del Mar Classical Music Orchestra) was born in Viña del Mar, and in Antofagasta the "Orquesta Sinfónica de la Universidad de Chile" (Symphony Orchestra of the University of Chile) was founded. In 1962, the Organization of American States and the Faculty of Science and Musical Arts created the "Instituto Interamericano de Educación Musical" (Interamerican Institute of Musical Education). Between 1962 and 1968, Jose Visencio Asuar released several albums of electronic music in Germany (Karlsruhe) and Venezuela (Caracas), and Tomás Lefever composed 19 tracks in this genre. The University of Concepción created its "Escuela superior de música" (Music College) in 1963, and in Lota, coal miners created the "Coro Polifonico de Lota" (Lota Polyphonic Choir). In La Serena in 1965, the Basic Music School was created, based on the experiences of the Children's Orchestra from the same city. The same year in Osorno, a Philharmonic Orchestra was created, along with a music college in the city's university. In 1966, the institute of music research released the first anthology album of Chilean folkloric music. In the same year, at the Universidad Catolica, Samuel Claro released his second electronic music album, "Estudio N°1". In 1967, the first electronic albums were released, with Asuar's "Tres ambientes sonorous" (1967) and Amenábar's "Klesis" (1968).

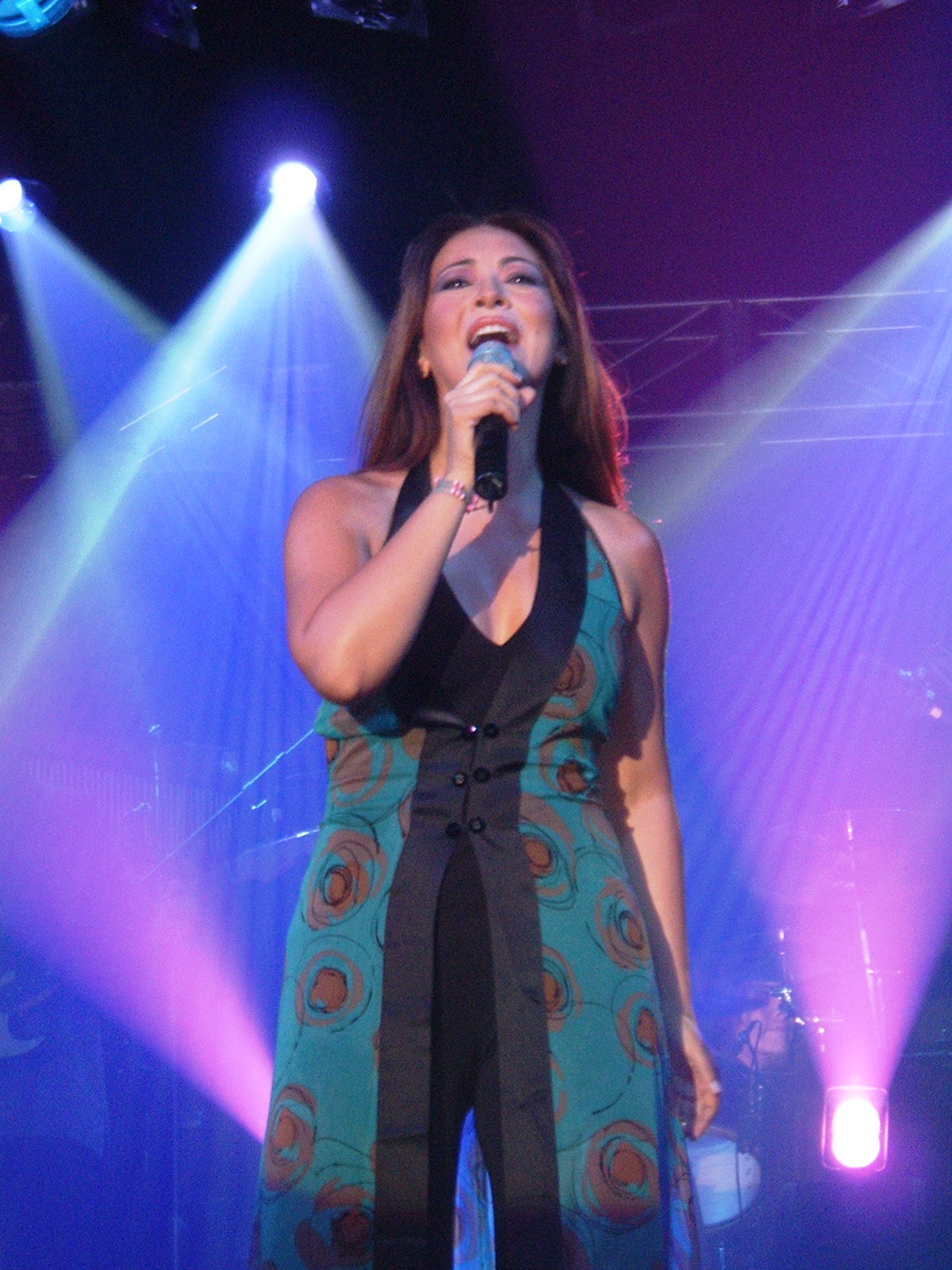
Myriam Hernández was the first Chilean artist to reach the top of Billboard Hot Latin Songs chart with "Peligroso Amor" in 1990.

From 1966-1968, the education reforms led by the government caused a big impact on music education in schools, with more, better trained teachers required and new methods of study used. Around this time, in the second half of the 60s and first half of the 70s, the Nueva canción chilena (New Chilean Song) movement began to emerge with Violeta Parra's efforts to preserve over 3,000 Chilean songs, recipes, traditions, and proverbs. Other members of this movement included Víctor Jara, Patricio Manns, Isabel Parra, Ángel Parra, Osvaldo "Gitano" Rodríguez, and the bands Quilapayún, Inti Illimani and Illapu. In 1969, the Music Department of the University of Chile in Antofagasta was created, and in 1970, the Symphony Orchestra of Chile performed the first televised concert broadcast via satellite, which was seen across almost all of the continent. The "Opera Nacional" (National Opera) was also founded under the "Instituto de Extencion Musical" and continuously incorporated national themes into their works. After the 1973 Chilean coup d'état, music, like almost all forms of culture, suffered a major setback, especially popular music, due to the political affiliation of some musicians. In the 1980s, the generation that grew up under the military regime slowly began to recover some cultural ground from the supporters of the regime. Punk and rock were a means to express political discontent, and were used as a form of protest. During this time, some bands distribute their material via homemade cassettes, and by the end of the regime, bands like Los Prisioneros would gain international recognition. In the 1990s, Chile reconnected with the world and trends from Europe and the USA became part of Chile's popular culture. The national music industry that had almost disappeared during the military regime was reborn, and local branches of the big record labels attempted to promote local bands, with varying results.

== Chilean folk music ==
=== Northern Chilean folk music ===
Northern traditional music in the territories between the regions of Arica y Parinacota and Coquimbo has been highly influenced by Andean music and by the Quechua, Aymara, Atacama and other cultures who lived around the area occupied by the Inca Empire prior the European arrival. Other elements that influenced northern folklore included Spanish colonial military bands and the Catholic Church, due to the fact that both institutions had music as part of their ceremonies, and were therefore some of the only people who had musical instruments and the means to teach music methodically. Traditional music has a dominant role in religious celebrations, which, in this zone of the country as in many other parts of the Americas, blends pre-Columbian and Christian forms of celebrating holy days. One example of this mixture is the Diablada (Devil Dance) ritual, a colourful mix of dances and instrumental music. The La Tirana Festival, which takes place every July 16 in the town of La Tirana, is a fine example of both diabladas and Christian devotion.

- Northern Chile music instruments
Northern Chile music instruments
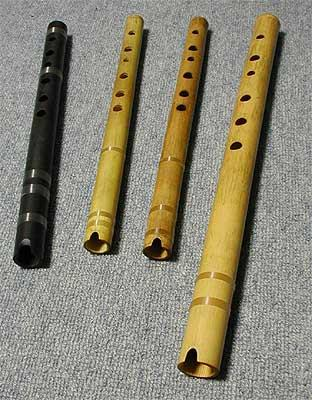
Quena, also spelled kena

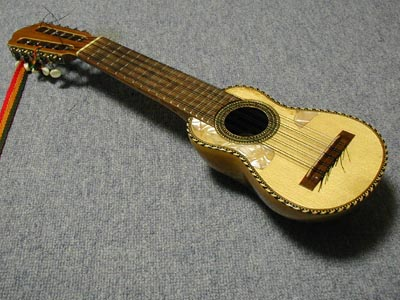
Charango of the Andean regions of Chile, Peru and Bolivia

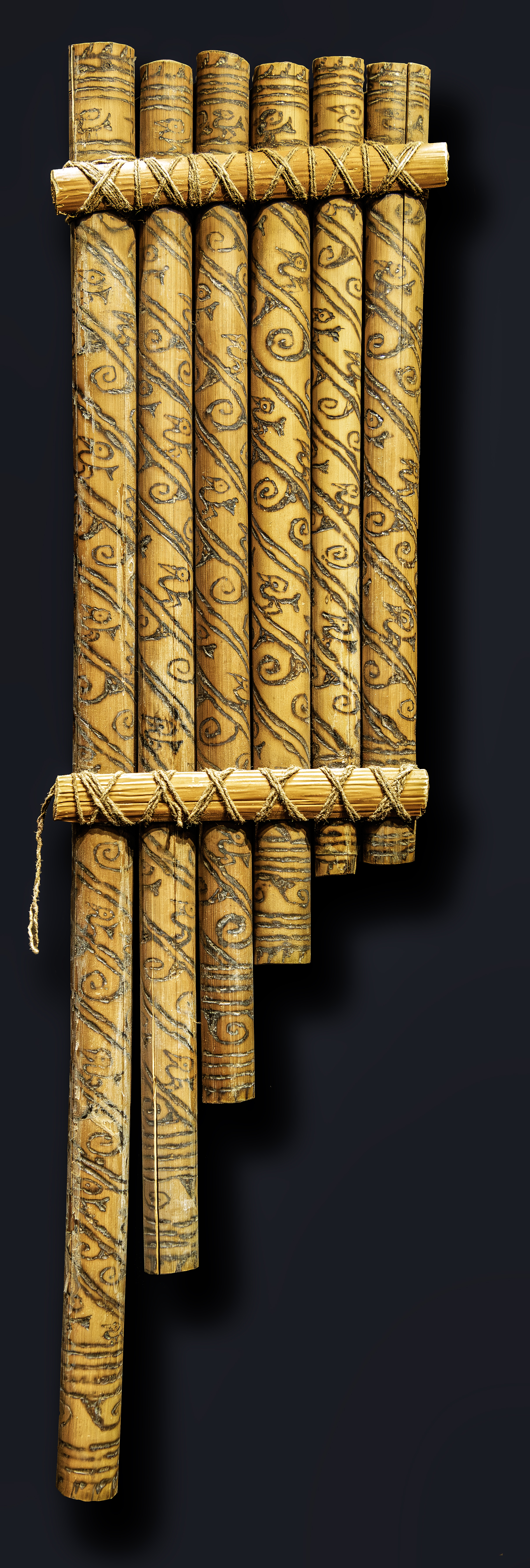
Zampoña or siku

Traditional musical instruments of northern Chile

Some traditional musical instruments in this area were brought by the Spanish, while others are inherited from the native peoples. They include:

- Quena (Quechua): Also known as "Kena", this is the traditional flute of the Andes. Traditionally made of totora, it has six finger holes and one thumb hole.
- Zampoña: The siku (Quechua: antara, Aymara: siku, also "sicu," "sicus," "zampolla" or Spanish zampoña), is a traditional Andean panpipe. This is the main instrument used in a musical genre known as sikuri. It is traditionally found all across the Andes but is more typically associated with music from the Kollasuyo, or Aymara speaking regions around Lake Titicaca.
- Ocarina: This is a common instrument around the world. In the Americas, it dates from the time of the Incas and is used for festivals, rituals and ceremonies in some areas of the Arica y Parinacota and Tarapacá regions. Ocarinas in this part of the world are made of clay with 8–9 holes, sometimes shaped like an animal.
- Charango: The charango is a small Andean stringed instrument of the lute family. It originated in Quichua and Aymara populations in post-Columbian times, after the Americas came across the European stringed instruments, and survives in what are today the Andean regions of Bolivia, Peru, north of Chile and the northwest of Argentina, where it is widespread as a popular music instrument. About 66 cm long, the charango was traditionally made with the shell of an armadillo (quirquincho, mulita) and can also be made of wood, which is the most common material found today and considered more resonant. The charango is primarily played in traditional Andean music, but is sometimes used by other Latin American musicians. It typically has 10 strings in five courses of 2 strings each, but other variations exist. A charango player is called a charanguista.
- Bombo nortino: Literally "Northern bass drum", this is a regional variation of the Bass drum, traditionally made of wood and covered in leather. It is used in most of the religious and pagan ceremonies.

=== Central Chilean folk music ===
The "Valle central" (Central Valley) is the extension of land that runs from the Chacabuco mountain range, which separates the Aconcagua and Maipo Valleys in the north of the Valparaiso region, to the Biobío River. The folklore in central Chile, as in southern Chile, is closely linked to rural life and Spanish heritage. The most iconic figure is the Huaso, a countryman and skilled horseman, similar to the American cowboy, Mexican charro or the gaucho of Argentina. In Central Chile, the cueca and tonada dances and songs are the most characteristic styles. In this area of the country the most popular instruments are the accordion (introduced by the German immigrants through the south), guitar, harp, tambourine and the tormento, a Chilean instrument of colonial times used in the salon parties or "tertulias", similar to a xylophone.

Among the other dances and music that are part of central Chilean folklore are the "Sajuriana", originally from Argentina, "the Refalosa" introduced from the north, and the "Vals", inherited from Europe and very popular during the first half of the nineteenth century among the upper classes. Others that are less well-known today include the "Corrido", "La Porteña", "El Gato", "La Jota", "El Pequén", "El Cuando", "El Aire", "El Repicao", "La Polka", "La Masurca", the "Guaracha campesina" and the "Esquinazo".

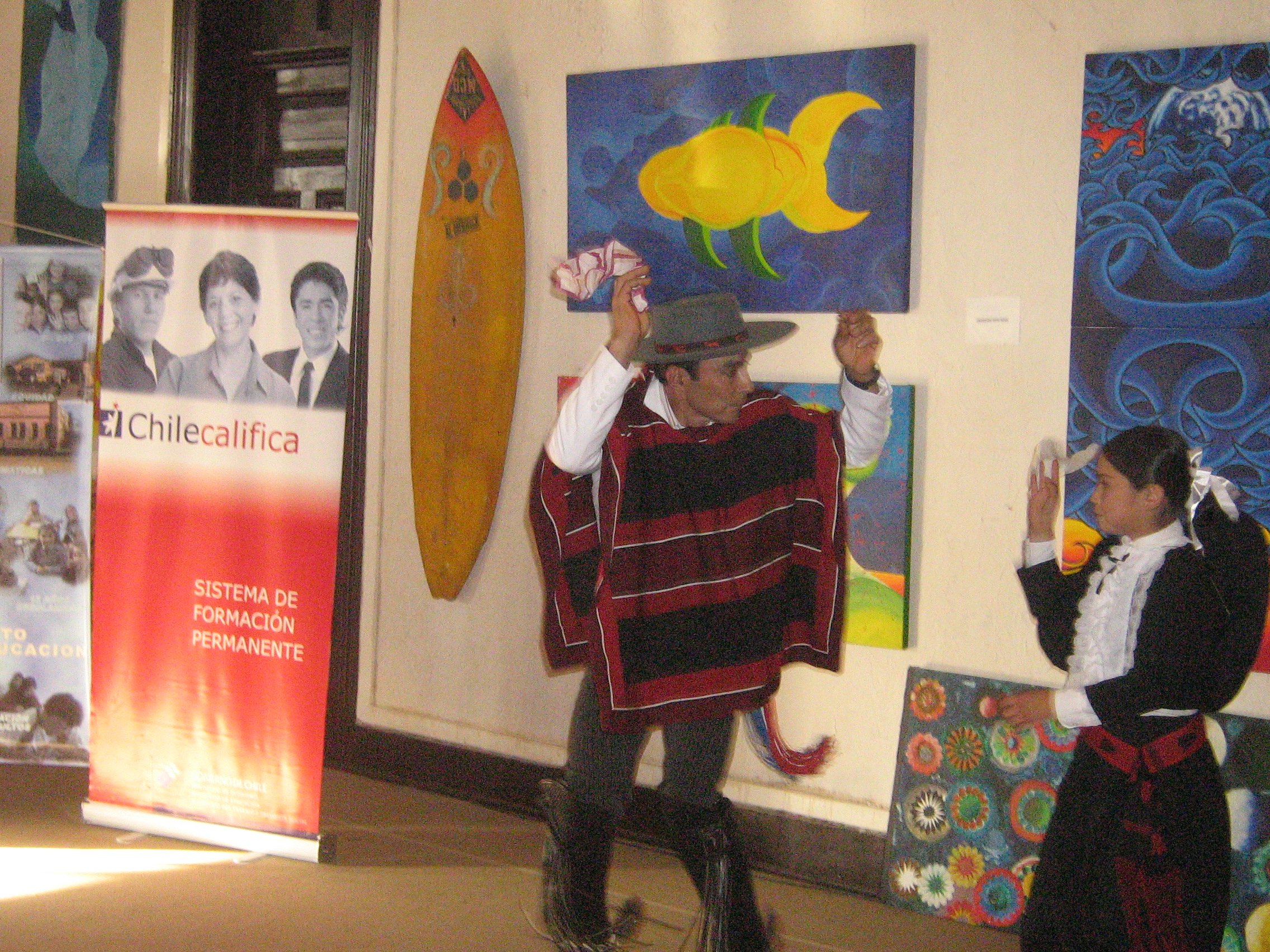
Chilean huasos dancing cueca in 2007, in the then Ross Casino of Pichilemu

Cueca

The cueca (short for zamacueca) has long been considered the "most traditional music and dance of Chile". Some of the earliest records of the cueca suggest it came into being around the 1820s, though its origins are debated. Since September 18, 1979, cueca has been affirmed as the official national dance.

Cueca is written in a combination of 6/8 and 3/4 at the same time and has a very rigid structure that is divided into three sections: the "cuarteta", which contains four verses in eight syllables with rhymes in the second and fourth verses; the "seguidilla"; and the "remate". The structure looks like this:

- Cuarteta.......A-B-B-A-B-B............TOTAL: 24 measures
- Seguidilla.....A-B-B-A-B-(B)...........TOTAL: (20) 24 measures
- Remate........ A ...........................TOTAL: 4 measures

According to Pedro Humberto Allende, a Chilean composer, "neither the words nor the music obey any fixed rules; various motives are freely intermingled." There are some variants of cueca in some areas of the country In the northern regions, the cueca has no lyrics and is danced during religious feasts and carnival. The instruments used to perform it here include some of Andean origin, like sicus, zampoñas and brass (trumpets and tubas). In the central regions, the cueca has lyrics and the instruments most commonly used to perform it are the guitar, tambourine, accordion and bombo. On the island of Chiloe, the main difference in cueca consists of the absence of the initial "cuarteta". The verses of the seguidilla are repeated and there is a greater emphasis placed on the interpretation of the lyrics by the singer rather than on the music or the dance. Cueca brava (urban cueca) is a variation of the cueca that originated in the 1860s in the rougher neighbourhoods of cities, where it was sung and danced in places like bars and brothels.

Tonada

The Tonada is another important form of Chilean traditional song, arising from the music brought by Spanish settlers. It is not danced and is distinguished from the cueca by an intermediate melodic section and a more prominent melody in general. Several groups have taken the tonada as their main form of expression, such as Silvia Infantas y Los Baqueanos - Los Cóndores, Los Huasos Quincheros, Los Huasos de Algarrobal, Los de Ramon and others. The modern rural tonada is typically simple and "monotonous", as described by Raquel Barros y Manuel Dannemann.

Central Chilean musical instruments
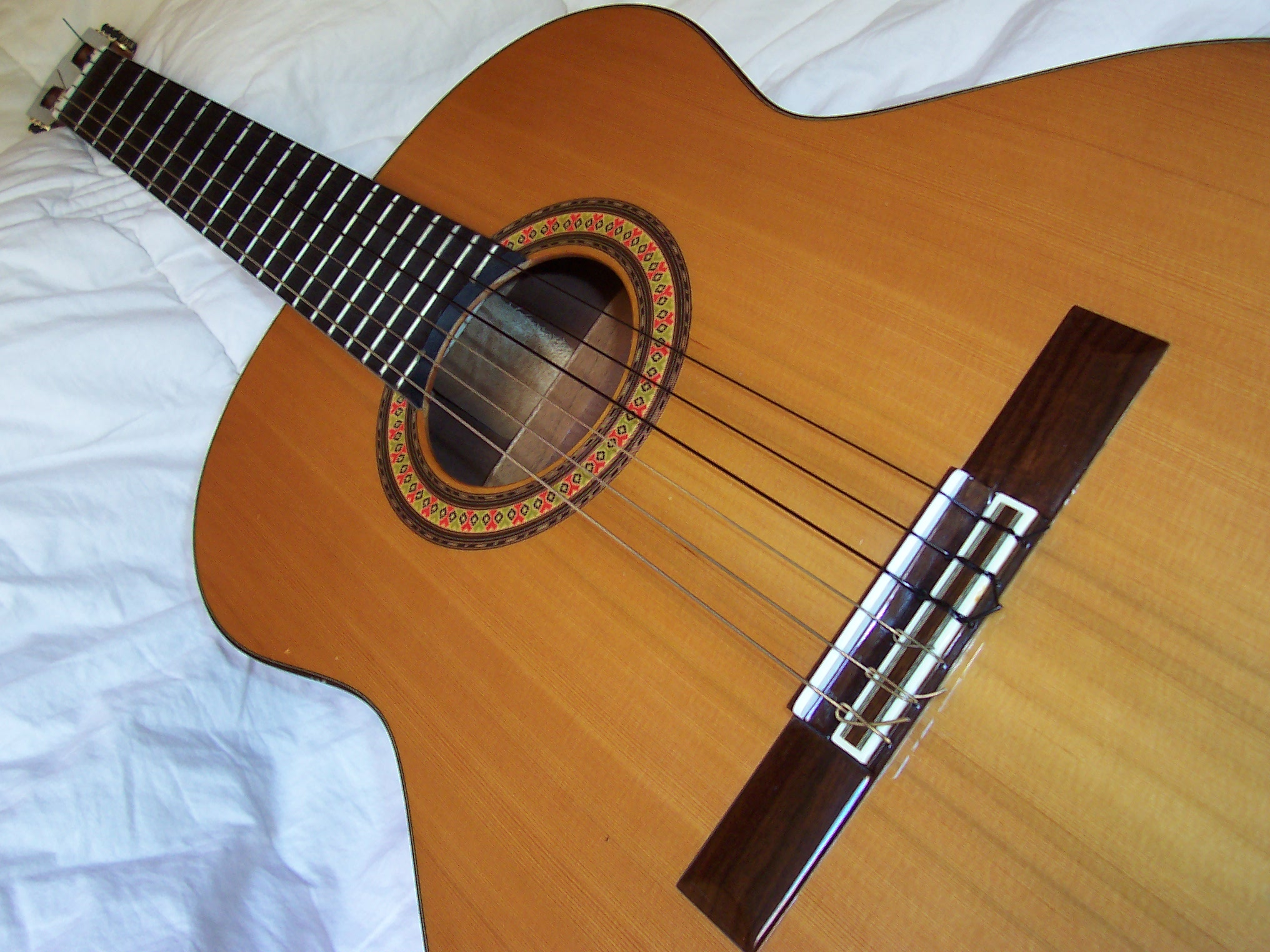
Acoustic guitar

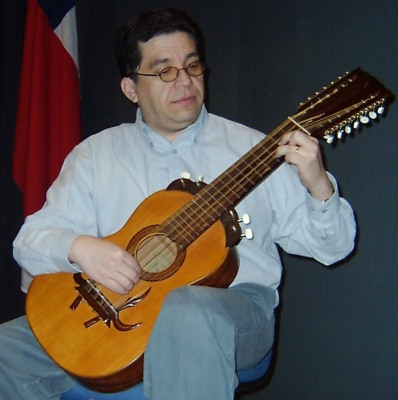
Chilean guitarron

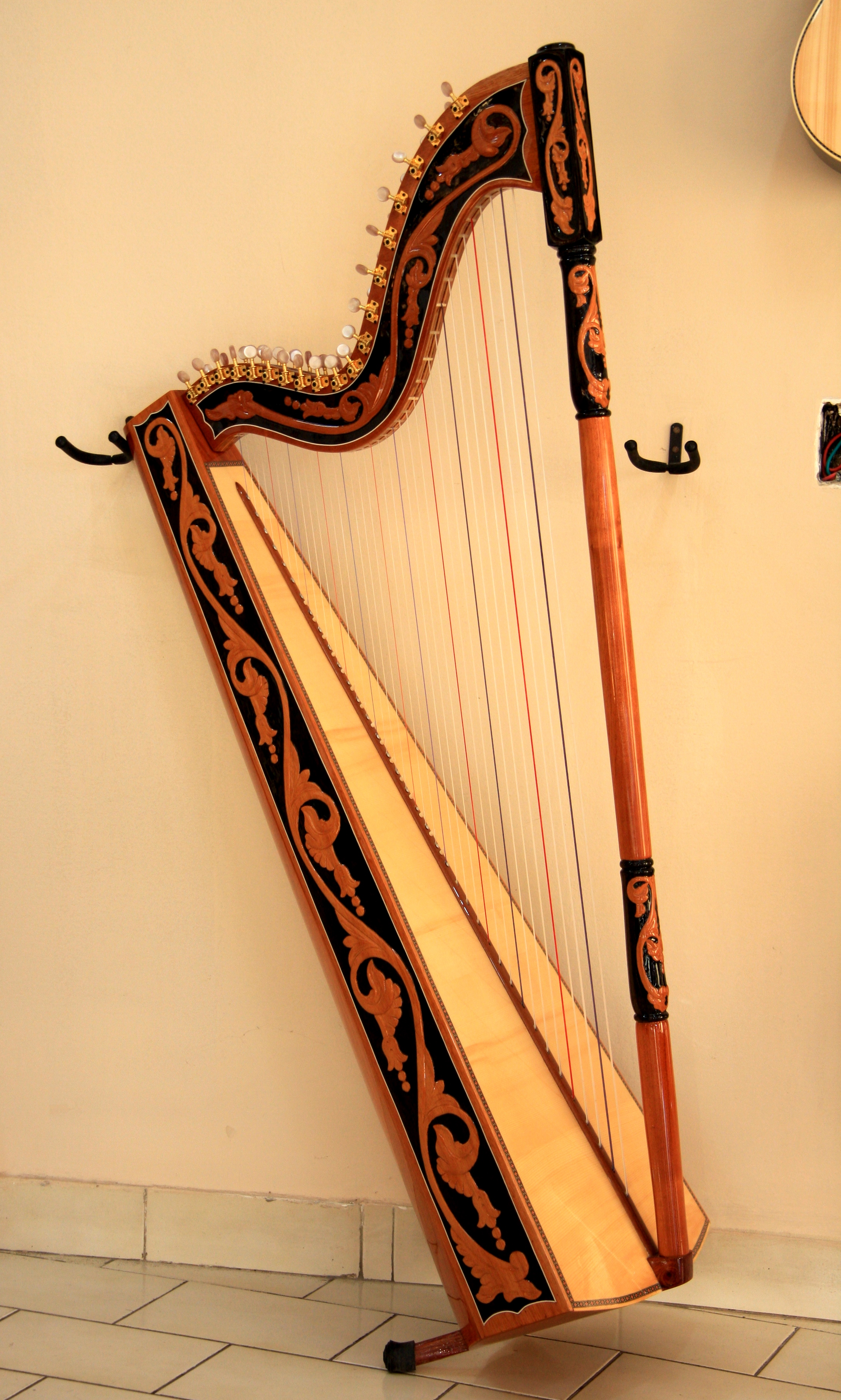
A Paraguayan harp; the Chilean is very similar

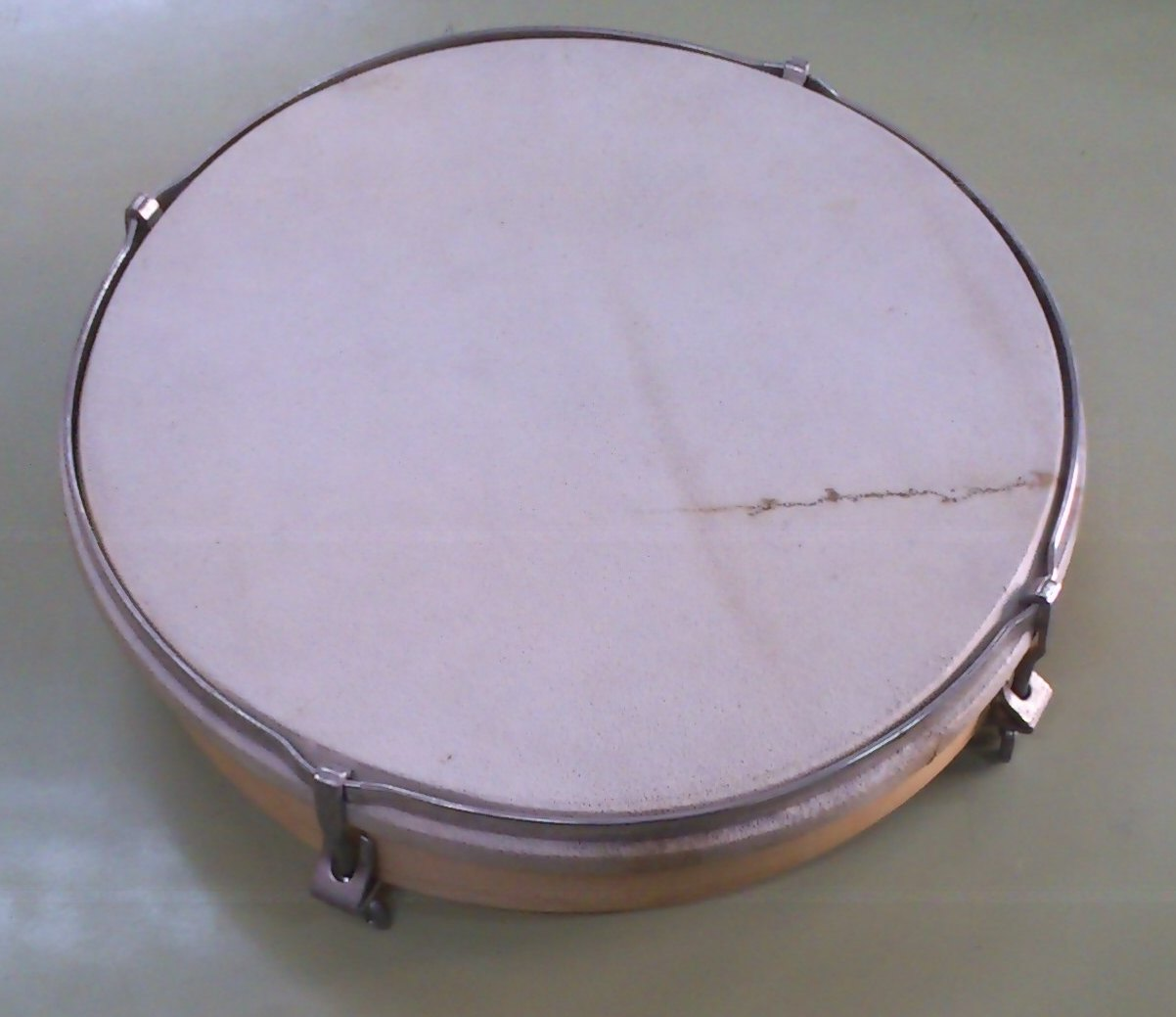
Pandero (tambourine).

=== Southern Chilean folk music ===
The challenging landscape, the persisting population of Huilliche people, and the Spanish heritage which did not fade as much as elsewhere in the country, has given southern Chilean music some particular characteristics. One of the places where this is most distinct is Chiloé. During the war of independence, Chiloé remained loyal to the Spanish Crown and royalist soldiers introduced to the islands dances like the "chocolate" and the "pericón". The main feature of Chilote music is its vitality, a quality that is apparent in dances of agile and lively pace A good part of the colonization of southernmost Chile carried out by Chilotes (the people of Chiloe), so their culture spread with them through southern Chile, including their music and dances. On the other hand, the German migrants that came to the provinces of Valdivia, Osorno and Llanquihue brought with them some of their customs and instruments, the most influential being the accordion, which quickly integrated into the existing music. Typical music and dances include:

- "Pericona"

One of the most popular dances among Chilotes, this is danced by two loose couples, handkerchiefs in hands. It most likely came from Argentina where it is called "Perico", and evolved in Chiloe, acquiring the name or "Pericona".

- "El Costillar"

El Costillar, literally the "rack", in reference to a rack of beef or pork, is a common dance in Chillan and in most isolated areas of southern Chile, most likely originating in Chiloé. It is a festive and competitive dance where the couples loosely dance around a bottle that has the function of a totem. The couple that knocks the bottle loses and has to leave the dance floor. As a "competition" dance, it can be danced by men only or by mixed couples.

- "La Trastrasera"

Native to Chiloé, but probably brought from Argentina by drovers who crossed the mountains with their cattle and goods, this dance was established in Chiloé and become part of the Chilean folklore. It is an easy dance to perform and can be adapted as rhythmic play for young children. The movements follow the instructions in the song lyrics.

- La trastrasera lyrics:

Mariquita dame un beso
que tu mama lo mandó.

Tu mama manda en lo suyo
y en lo mío mando yo.
tu mama manda en lo suyo
y en lo mío mando yo.

Tras tras por la trastrasera
y también por la delantera,
tras tras por un costao
también por el otro lao.

Darán una media vuelta
y también una vuelta entera,
se tomarán de la mano
y harán una reverencia.

Tras tras por la trastrasera
y también por la delantera,
tras tras por un costao
también por el otro lao.

- "El Chapecao"

"Chapecao" in Mapudungun means braiding, and refers to the nature of the dance that accompanies this song. The song starts with a guitar playing solo and the couples taking part move around while the guitar plays. Suddenly the guitar stops and the dancers stop with it. This happens three times and then a cueca is played and danced, but the choreography allows the couples to exchange partners. After several exchanges the couples end with the same partner with which they started.

- "El Pavo"

This is a partner dance which simulates the courting rituals of the turkey, or "el pavo" in Spanish. The music of El Pavo is very similar to the cueca, though it lacks the concluding couplet, and its structure is based on an octosyllabic quatrain and rollovers.

- "Vals chilote"

The "Vals Chilote", or Chilote Waltz, is deeply rooted in southern folklore and is also common in the central area of Chile. In the Chilote waltz, the man and woman dance in hold and the main difference with a normal Waltz is that the pace is more pronounced, resulting in very intense and energetic steps.

- Southern Chilean musical instruments
Southern Chilean musical instruments
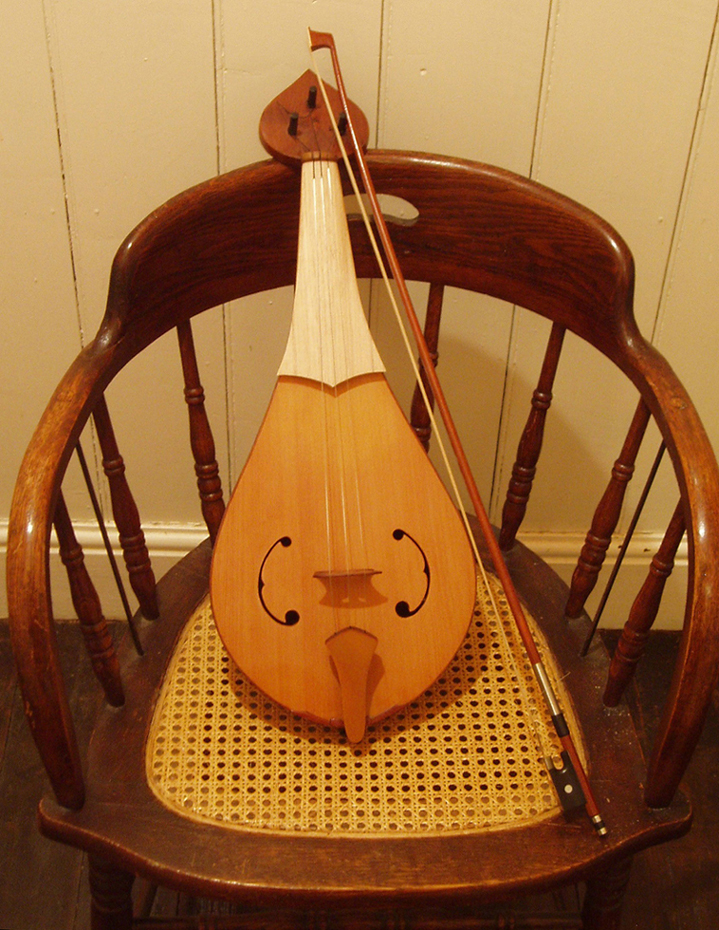
The Rebec or Rabel, as it is known is Spanish (similar to a small violin)

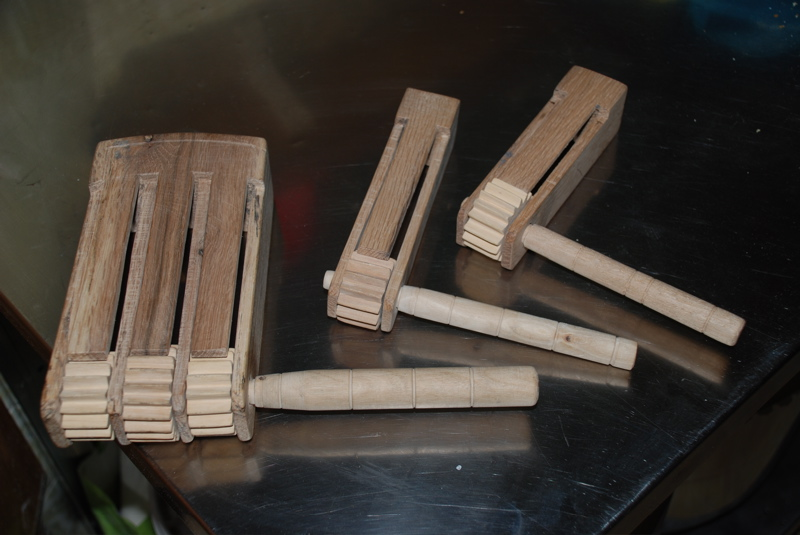
Ratchet (instrument)

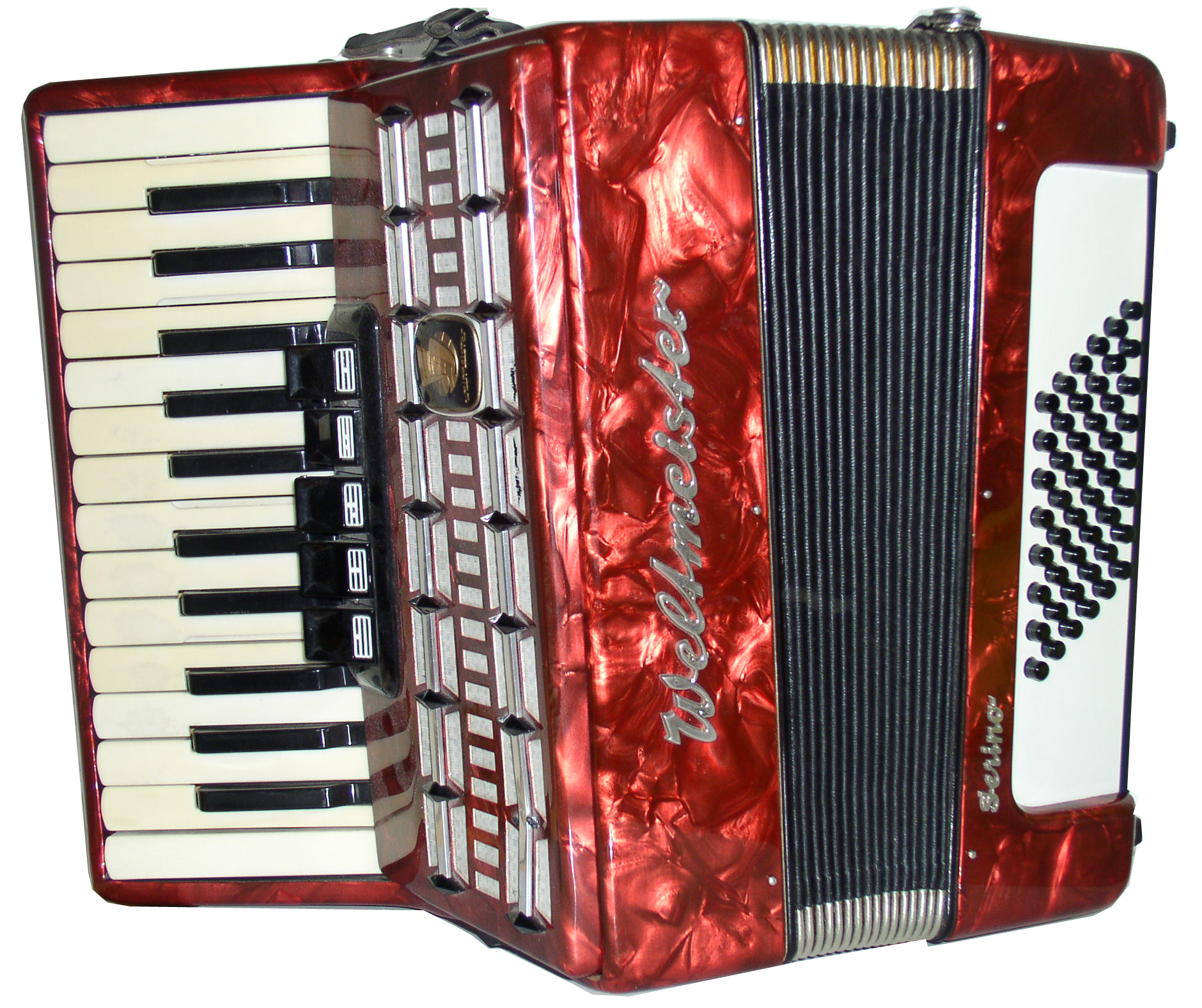
Accordion, introduced by German immigrants

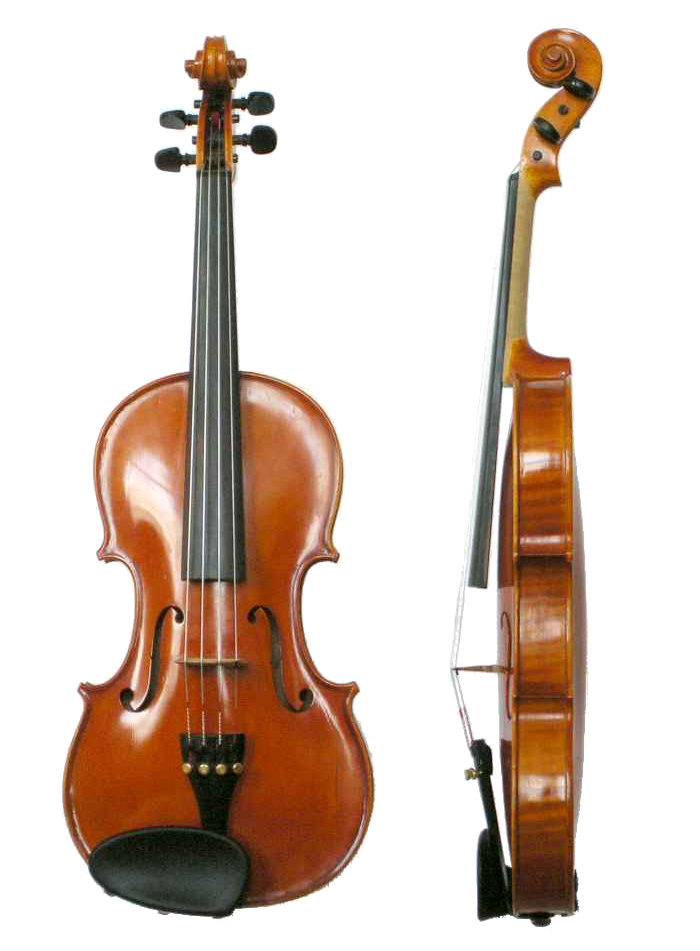
Violin

=== Rapa Nui (Easter Island) ===
Easter Island folk music has different origins from those of continental Chilean music. Instead, traditional music from the island consists of choral singing and chanting, similar to Tahitian music and the traditions of other Polynesian cultures. Families often performed as choirs, competing in an annual concert. They accompanied their chanting with a trumpet made from a conch and a percussive dancer jumping onto a stone which is set over a calabash resonator. Other instruments used include the kauaha, created from the jaw bone of a horse; the accordion; and stones, which are clapped together for percussive effect. The most characteristic dances are: The "Sau Sau", a dance of Samoan origin that was introduced in the 1940s. The dance emphasizes female grace and sensuality and in the choreography, the couple performs flexible movements of the hips and hands. The "Ula Ula", a dance of Tahitian origin that is usually performed during local festivities. The couples dance separated undulating their hips laterally. The "Tamuré" also a Tahitian dance, is very fast and acrobatic and requires highly skilled dancers. The Rainstick, Ukulele, Drum, and flute are instruments typically used in Rapa Nui music.

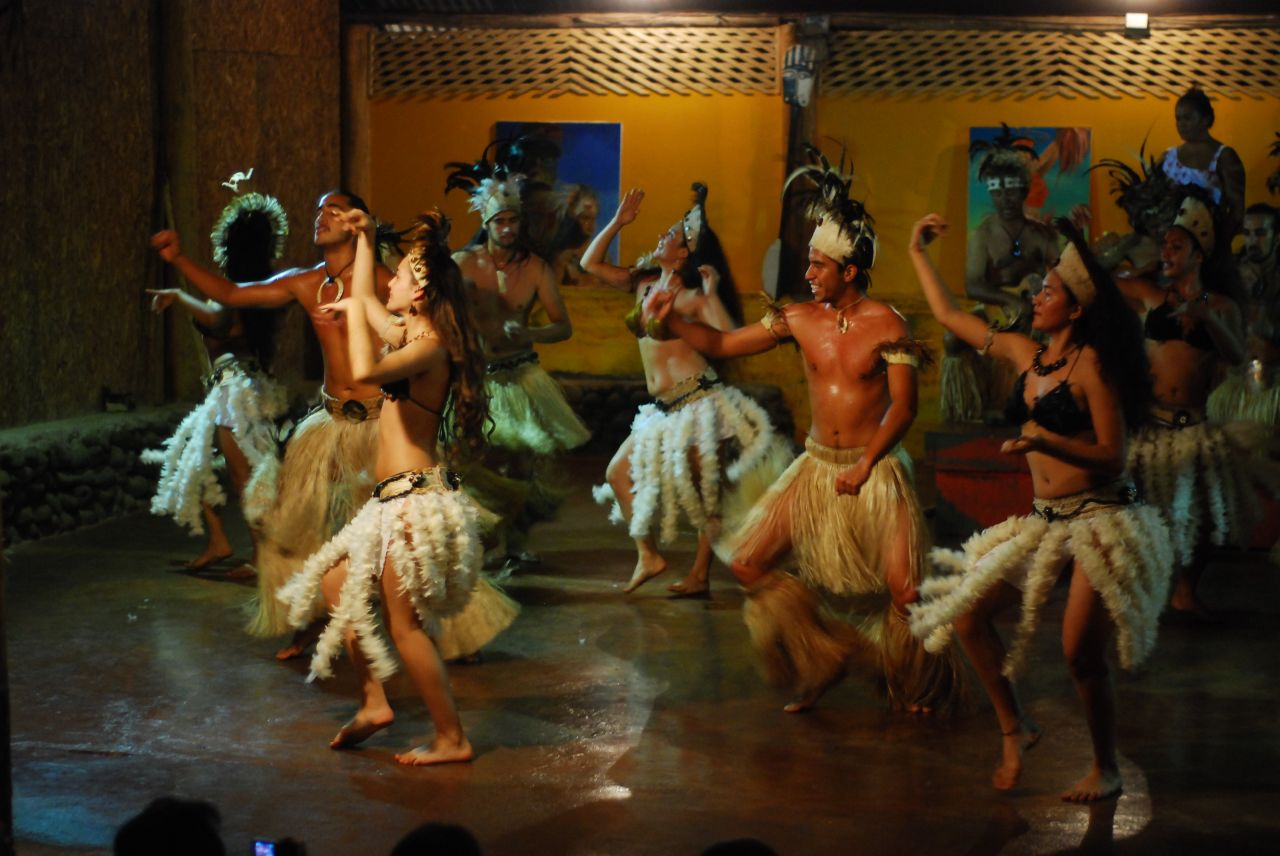
Music and dances from Easter Island

=== City folk music ===
- "Música Tipica"

From the 1920s onwards, Chilean folk music or "Música Tipica" (traditional music) experienced a rebirth. This rebirth brought rural music and folklore into the cities, on to the radios and caught the attention of a flourishing music industry, which took some of the more refined versions of Chilean "Tonada" and transformed them into a spectacle for the cities. One of the first groups that can be linked to this style are "Los Huasos de Chincolco", who started a trend that inspired the public, although their music had little in common with real rural folk music. In the 1930s and after, groups like Los Huasos Quincheros, Los Cuatro Hermanos, Ester Sore, Silvia Infantas y los Cóndores, and Francisco Flores del Campo kept this style alive and became very popular. During the 1940s and 1950s, this refined version of folkloric music became a national emblem, mainly for its aesthetic and as a spectacle to celebrate patriotism. One of the characteristics of the folkloric trend is its use of patriotic themes and a romantic, idealized view of rural life. That idealized view would be questioned in the following decades by Víctor Jara, Violeta Parra and the other musicians that formed the "Nueva Cancion Chilena" movement.

== La Nueva Canción Chilena ==
The Nueva Canción (New Song) is a movement that appeared in the mid 1960s and involved not just Chile but the rest of Latin America and Spain. The movement incorporated strong political and social themes and was used as a tool for expressing political and social conscience. The Nueva Canción Chilena (New Chilean Song) broke with the prevailing folkloric styles of its time, which presented an idealized view of the rural world and ignored the situation of marginalized workers on the "Fundos" (large estates) and in isolated rural areas of the country. In a period of political struggle across Latin America, the "Nueva Canción" became associated with political activism and reformers like the Chilean Salvador Allende and his Popular Unity government. It soon emerged in other countries like Argentina, where the movement was called "Nuevo Cancionero" and was led by Mercedes Sosa and Armando Tejada Gómez among others. The foundations of the movement were laid through the efforts of Violeta Parra to revive over 3,000 Chilean songs, recipes, traditions, proverbs and folkloric characters, like the payadores (improviser-singers). Violeta Parra, and artists like her, acted as a vehicle for a folkloric tradition that otherwise would have remained unknown for many Chileans in the cities. Violeta Parra and her brothers paved the way for other key Chilean folkloric artists like Rolando Alarcón, Payo Grondona, Patricio Castillo, Homero Caro, Tito Fernández, Kiko Álvarez, Patricio Manns and Víctor Jara. Jara emerged as one of the major voices of the Nueva Canción and began its traditions of criticising government officials and policies. Since September 1973, the new military government of Augusto Pinochet threatened Nueva Canción artists, driving them underground during the 1970s. Cassette tapes of artists like Inti-Illimani and Quilapayún were circulated in a clandestine manner. The groups continued to oppose Pinochet's government from exile, and helped inspire Nueva Canción singers from Uruguay (Daniel Viglietti), El Salvador (Yolocamba l'ta), Guatemala (Kin-Lalat), Mexico (Amparo Ochoa), Nicaragua (Carlos Goodys and Luís Enrique Mejía Godoy), as well as Cuban Nueva Trova artists like Pablo Milanés.

== Popular music ==
=== Rock and roll ===
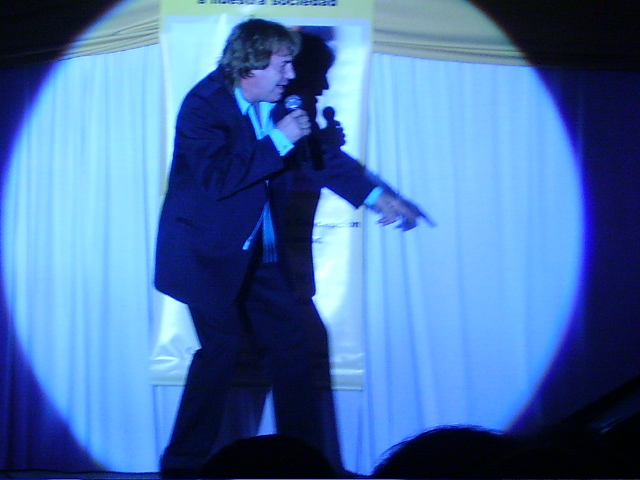
Peter Rock

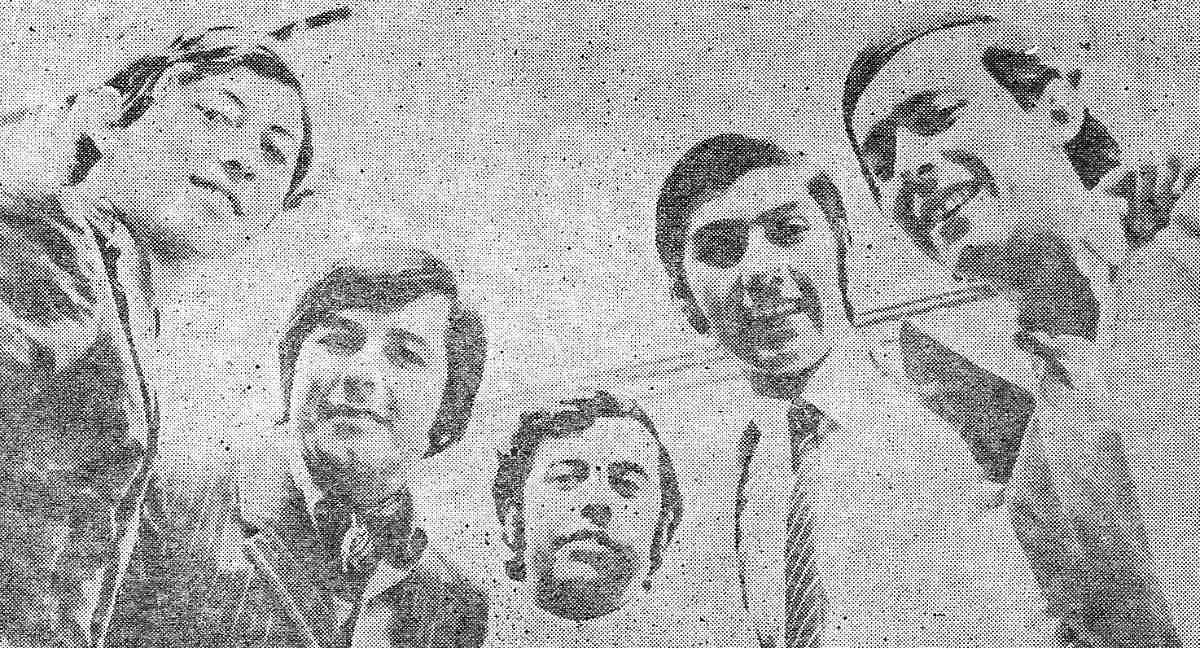
Los Ángeles Negros

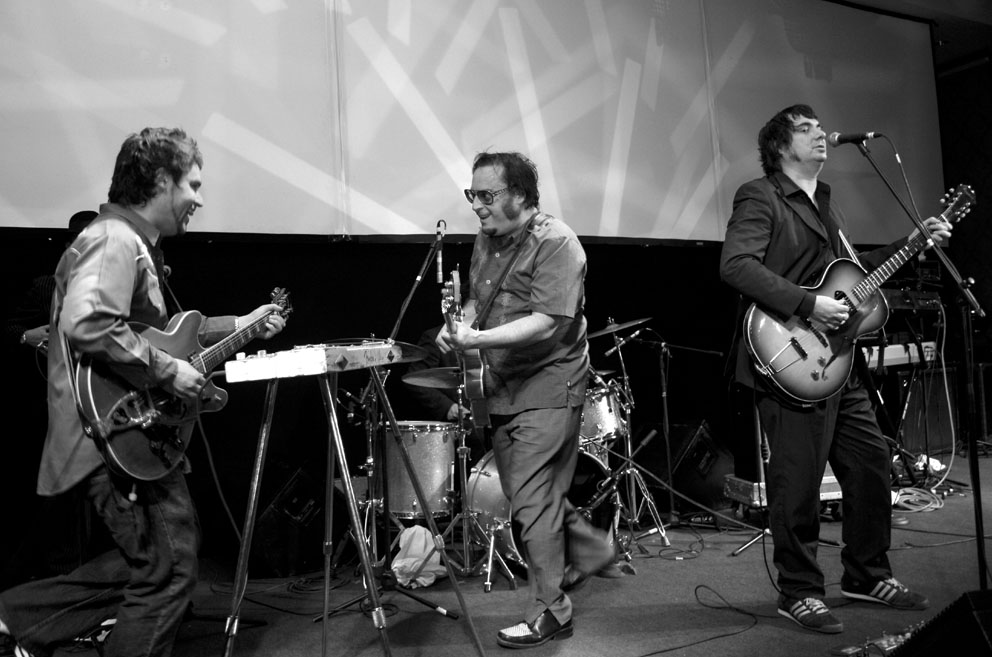
Los Tres

Rock and roll music was first produced in Chile in the late 1950s by bands that imitated and were inspired by international rock and roll hits from the U.S., often translating these songs for the Chilean market. This movement was known as the Nueva Ola (New Wave). During the second half of the 1960s, after the success of rock and roll music, the Fusión latinoamericana (Latin American fusion) and Nueva Canción (New Song) genres were born in Chile, bringing together rock and roll and Latin American folk music. Los Jaivas are an example of this fusion between the two convergent styles.

In the 1970s, however, the country's rock scene declined due to political repression The 1980s saw the beginning of a revival of rock music in Chile which has continued until the modern day, with the growth of many rock subgenres and many Chilean bands finding success on the international market in recent years. Some of the most successful Chilean rock bands are: Los Prisioneros, Lucybell, La Ley, Javiera Mena, Francisca Valenzuela, Los Jaivas, Los Tres, Chancho en Piedra, Panico, Sol y Lluvia, Nicole, Los Miserables, Buddy Richard.

=== Hip-hop and rap ===
Since the mid to late 1980s, hip-hop music have had a considerable influence on the Chilean music scene and culture. People of Chile had their first contact with this genre through the television and radio. First to appear and gain popularity were Breakdance and breakers groups: "Montaña Breakers", "B14", "T.N.T.", "Floor Masters". Breakers from all over the capital would gather in Bombero Ossa Street in Central Santiago to share music and have breakdance "battles". Then came the first Chilean rap groups, such as "Los Marginales" and "Panteras Negras". The return of immigrants after the end of the dictatorship could also have been a factor that increased the popularity of hip-hop and rap, with examples such as Jimmy Fernandez (ex La Pozze Latina) returning from Italy, or "Floor Masters" front man who came from Los Angeles. However, it wasn't until the mid-1990s that hip-hop gained mainstream popularity with successful groups such as Tiro de Gracia, Los Tetas, Makiza, Zaturno and La Pozze Latina. Commercial success was confirmed in 1997, when "Tiro de Gracia" and "Makiza" got Golden and Silver Discs and filled venues along the country. During the 2000s, some bands connected hip-hop with other styles like dancehall, reggae, and Latin rhythms. Also in the 2000s, political rap became popular, with groups like, "Panteras Negras", "LB1", "Subverso", "Guerrillerokulto" and "Salvaje Decibel". Como Asesinar a Felipes is the first Experimental hip-hop band that has achieved a considerable success, being produced by Koolarrow Records. Most recently, Chilean rapper Ana Tijoux (formerly of Makiza) has become one of the most successful rap artists, collaborating with Mexican musician Julieta Venegas and having tracks featured on the EA Sports video game FIFA 11. Her music has appeared in the popular TV series Breaking Bad (season 4, episode 5).

=== Chilean electronic music ===
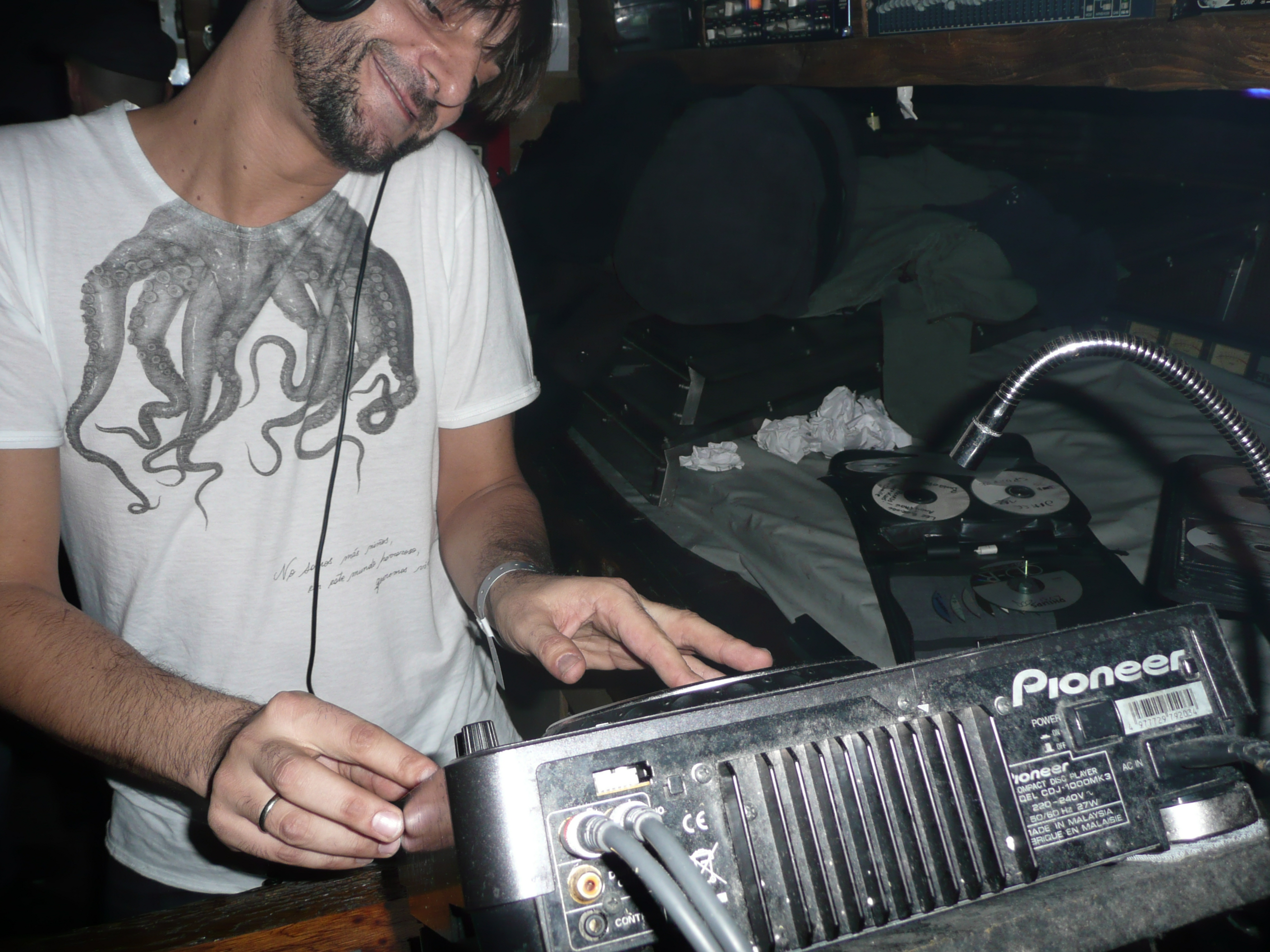
Villalobos at Fabric

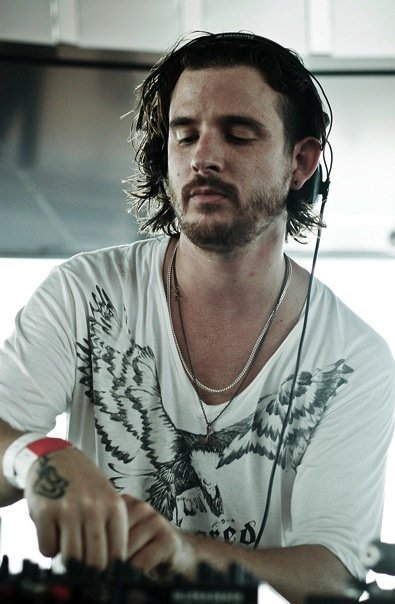
Lucien N Luciano, also known as Luciano (2007)

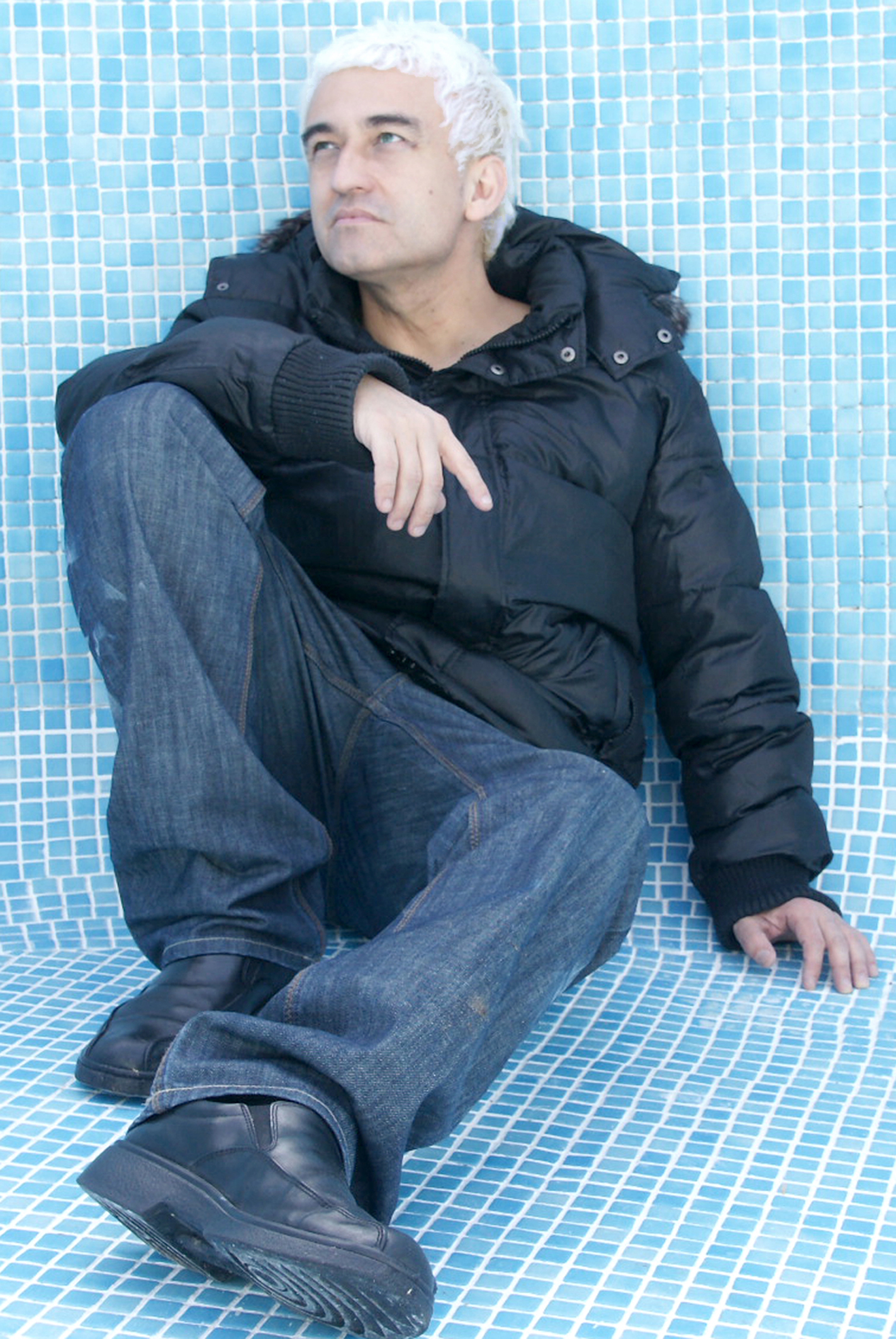
Jorge Gonzalez, the leader and voice of Los Prisioneros

The electronic music movement as we know it today reached Chile in the 1990s, but there are some earlier milestones worth mentioning, like the sound experiments of engineer and scientist Jose Visencio Asuar in 1959 after the 1958 visit of physicist Werner Meyer-Eppler, and the production of the first electronically generated music records in the 1960s.

"Electronica" has given Chile more international success than any other style of music; Chilean DJs and electronic music producers are among the most important in the international scene. Many Chilean DJs are based in Europe, particularly in Germany. Some were children of political exiles while others moved to Europe to develop their careers and then stayed following their great success. Some of the most important and best known electronic music artists are: Ricardo Villalobos, Andrés Bucci, Cristian Vogel, Latin Bitman, Danieto, Luciano, Pier Bucci, Nicolas Jaar and Jorge González.

=== Chilean cumbia ===
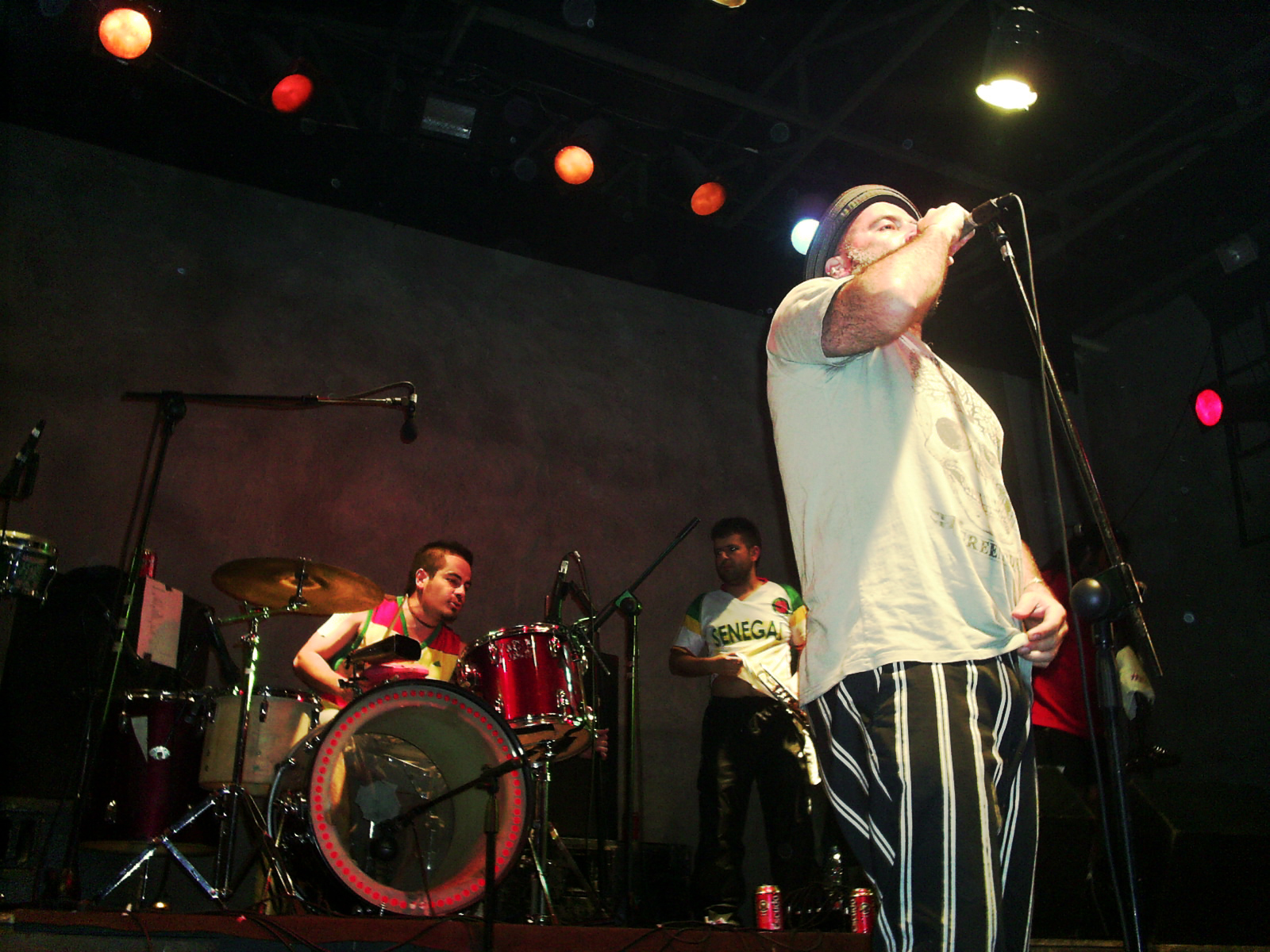
Chico Trujillo

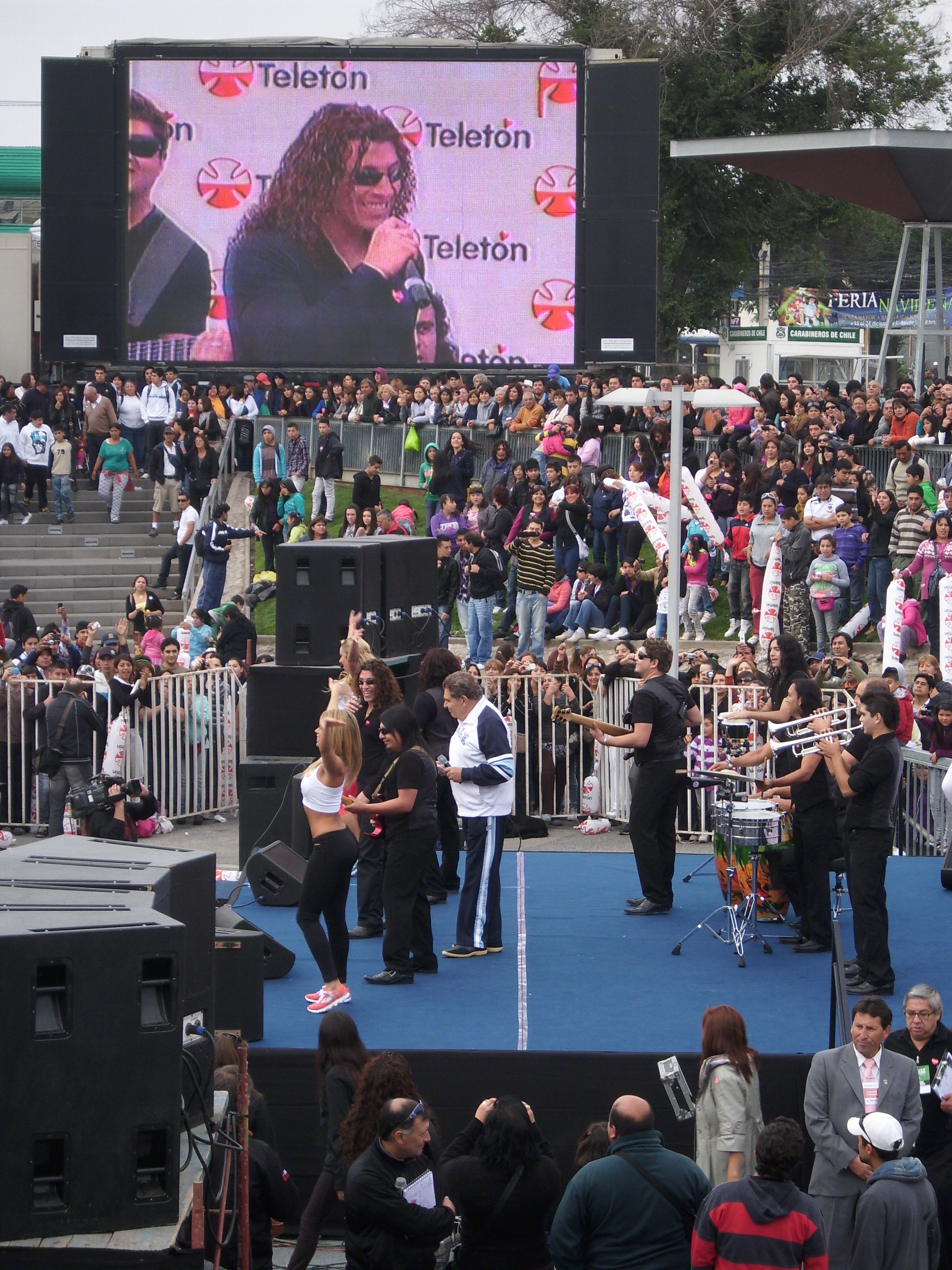
La Noche

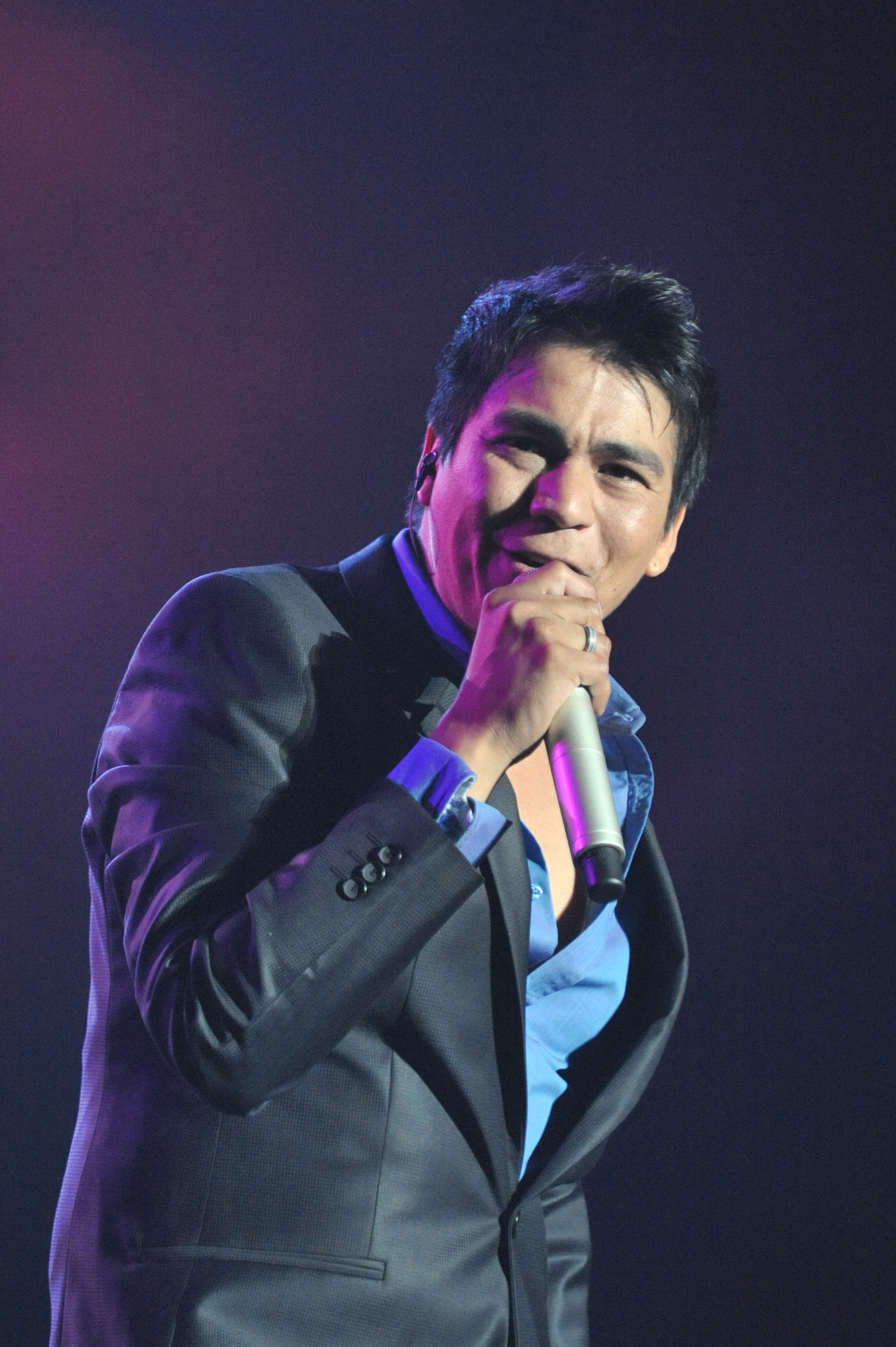
Américo

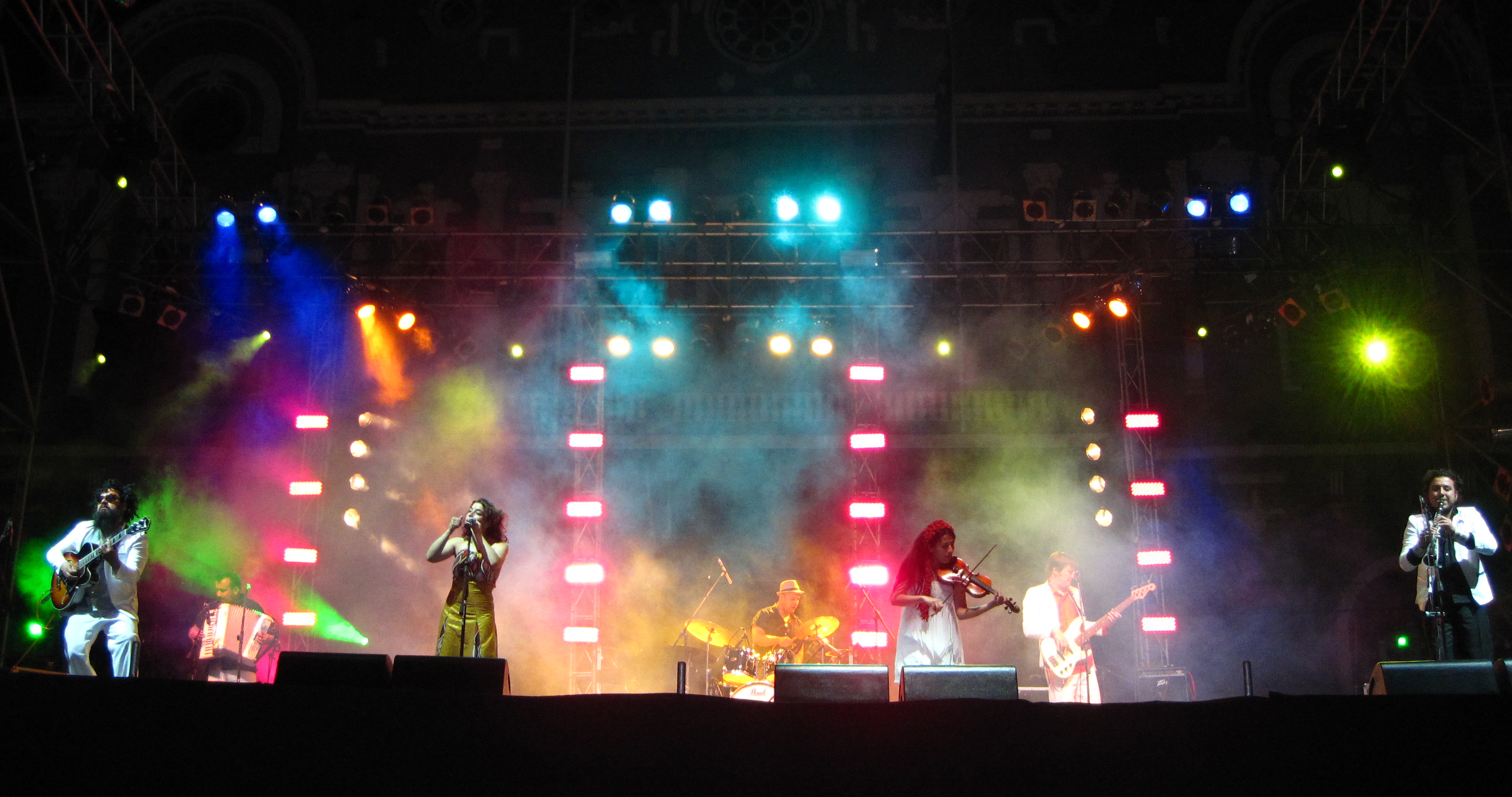
Mano Ajena

Cumbia style has its origins in the caribbean climates of Colombia, Venezuela and Panama, and was introduced to Chile in the mid 1960s by the Venezuelan Luisín Landáez. Later in the same decade, Colombian musician Amparito Jiménez would record and release albums in Chile and had great success with the song "La pollera colora", one of the most emblematic Colombian songs. Later, the Chilean band Sonora Palacios would bring cumbia to mass popularity among the Chilean population. Since the beginning, Chile has developed its own kind of cumbia known as "cumbia sonora" or just "traditional Chilean cumbia", with long standing orchestras such as Orquesta Huambaly, La Sonora de Tommy Rey, Sonora Palacios, Los Vikings 5, Giolito y su combo and Pachuco y la Cubanacán. These have been some of the most popular acts in the last 50 years and still enjoy mainstream popularity, seen as part of Chile's musical culture and identity. Chilean cumbia added brass instruments, piano and a faster percussion to the original cumbia style. The process of adaptation and evolution created a sub style that can be easily identified from the original. Chilean cumbia bands are called "Combos", "Sonoras" or simply "Orquestas" (orchestras) and are formed by 10 or more musicians where the brass and the drums have an important role. Cumbia developed this orchestral performance style in the 1960s, adapting from the tropical orchestras that had played rhythms such as the cha-cha-cha, mambo, rumba, bolero, and merengue in the 1920–1940s. Some subgenres that were not originally from Chile also became popular in the country: In the 1990s, cumbia sound, known in other countries of Latin America as Technocumbia, is a style of dumbia where there is a fusion between electronic sounds generated by electronic drums, and electric guitar. "Technocumbia" was a name given to the subgenre in Mexico to describe this type of music. However, the style was developed throughout South America with different names: "Sound" in Chile. emerged, a style where great emphasis was placed on the (usually romantic) lyrics and where the artists can be a solo male or female singer rather than a band. Unlike Technocumbia, cumbia romantica arrangements tend to be acoustic. Some performers in this subgenre are La Noche and Américo). Also in the 2000s, a style called New Chilean cumbia or "Cumbia Rock" emerged, led by bands like (Chico Trujillo, La Mano Ajena, and Juana Fe). This new Chilean cumbia is highly influenced by rock and some hip hop groups, although in some cases the influence of Andean music, Balkan music Klezmer, Salsa and Bolero can be heard. It main exponents are Chico Trujillo, Banda Conmoción, Juana Fe, La Mano Ajena, Cholomandinga, Villa Cariño, Combo Ginebra, etc.

=== Mexican music in Chile ===
Among the Chilean upper class, Mexican music has gained more acceptance since the 2000s. In part, this trend is explained by the popularity of the musical talent show Rojo Fama contra Fama on TVN, which aired for the first time in 2002. María José Quintanilla in particular gained acclaim on the program by singing ranchera songs.

== Chilean Jazz ==
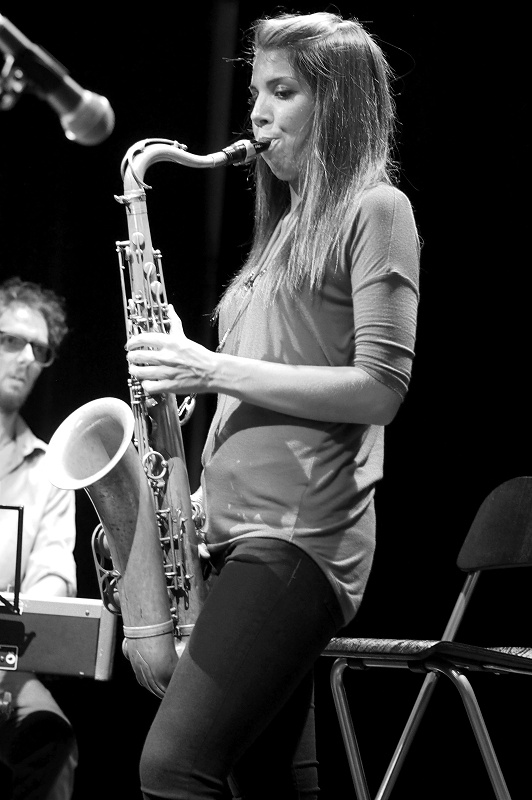
Melissa Aldana

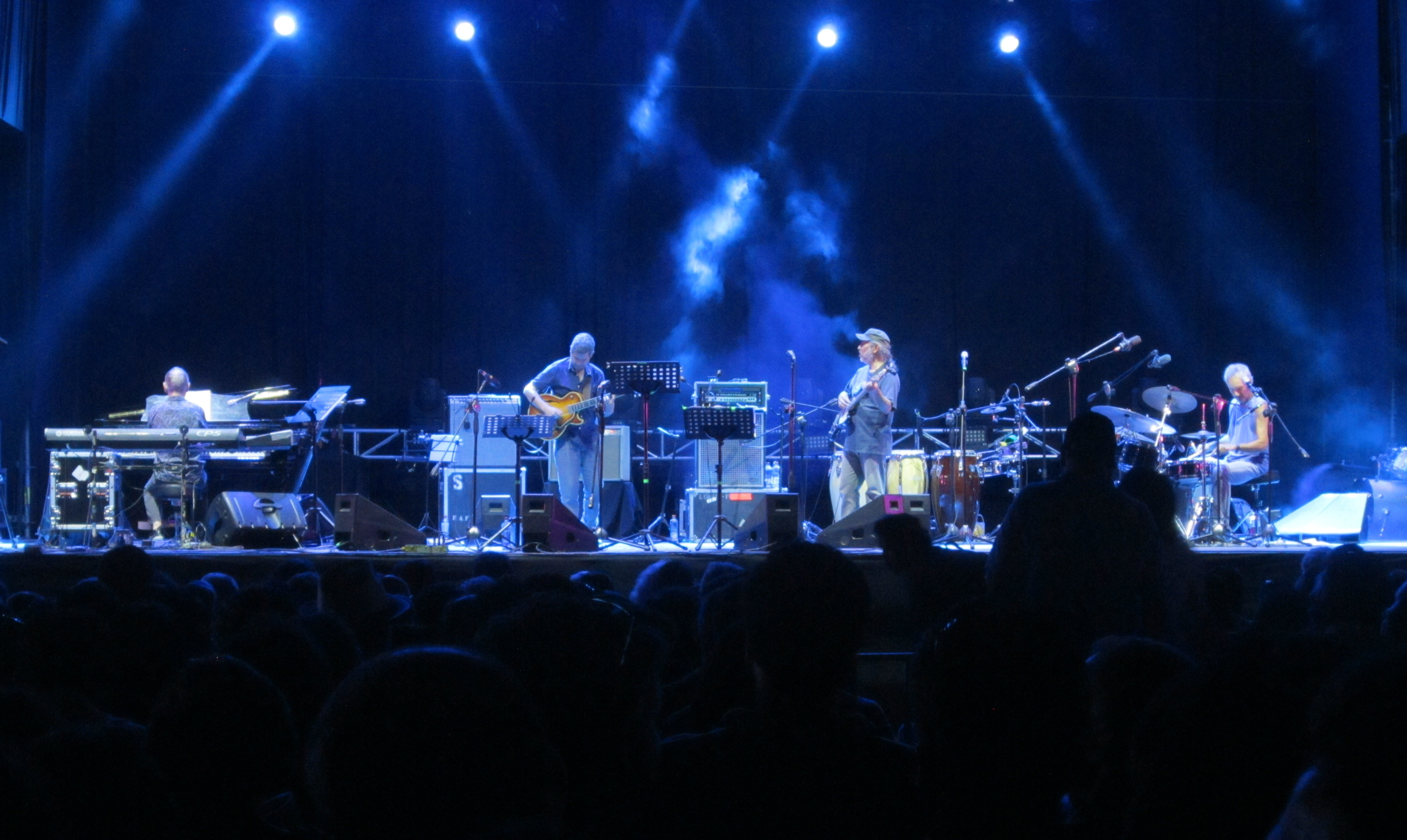
La Marraqueta in the Festival Internacional Providencia Jazz 2017

The practice of jazz is one of the most popular manifestations of popular music in Chile. The most regular tracks appear towards the 1920s around the figure of the composer, violinist and researcher Pablo Garrido Vargas, manager of the first ensembles and local jazz orchestras. From 1940, a new generation of young musicians aligned themselves with jazz improvisation beyond the predecessor jazz, which they considered commercial, deeming it 'hot jazz'. This would result in the founding of the Club de Jazz de Santiago in 1943 and the formation of the first national all-stars, The Chilean Aces of Jazz, in 1944 and 1945.

Modern jazz broke into the 1960s at the initiative of the pianist Omar Nahuel, at the head of the Nahuel Jazz Quartet. The band was not only a pioneer in the development of new jazz forms, such as bebop or cool, but also brought together enthusiastic musicians of the figure of Charlie Parker and his descendants. In the 1970s, as in the rest of the world, the electric jazz installed a new expressive form and gave rise to new soloists in Chile.

Since the 1980s, jazz has had in Chile the possibility of training professional musicians thanks to the creation of ProJazz, the Escuela Moderna de Música and the School of Music of the Chilean Copyright Law Society, which has allowed the development of the jazz language during the following decades. With the creation of the Festival Internacional Providencia Jazz, in the year 2002, along with other communal festivals, jazz has achieved greater diffusion for the non-expert public in the 21st century.

Currently, the national scene stands out for the multiplicity of styles, among which stand out: the group La Marraqueta in the avant-garde of the so-called jazz criollo, a wide variety of groups in the Latin American fusion, and the big bands, such as the Conchalí Big Band or Los Andes Big Band, in the traditional jazz as bebop or the swing.

Among the figures of contemporary Chilean jazz stand out: Jorge Vera, Ricardo Arancibia, Mariano Casanova, Cristián Cuturrufo, Camila Meza, Federico Dannemann, Sebastián Jordán, Mario Feito, Christian Gálvez, Pedro Greene, Martin Joseph, Ronnie Knoller, the Lecaros Family; Mario Lecaros, Pablo Lecaros, Roberto Lecaros, Agustín Moya, Gonzalo Palma, Ángel Parra Orrego, Andrés Pérez, Lautaro Quevedo, Felipe Riveros, Carla Romero, Moncho Romero, Melissa Aldana, Miguel Sacaan and Nicolás Vera, José Gil, Antonio Lambertini, Jorge Caraccioli and the groups La Marraqueta, Contracuarteto, Los Titulares, Ángel Parra Trío, Holman Trío, Caravana Trío and Ensemble Quintessence, among many others.

== Academic music ==
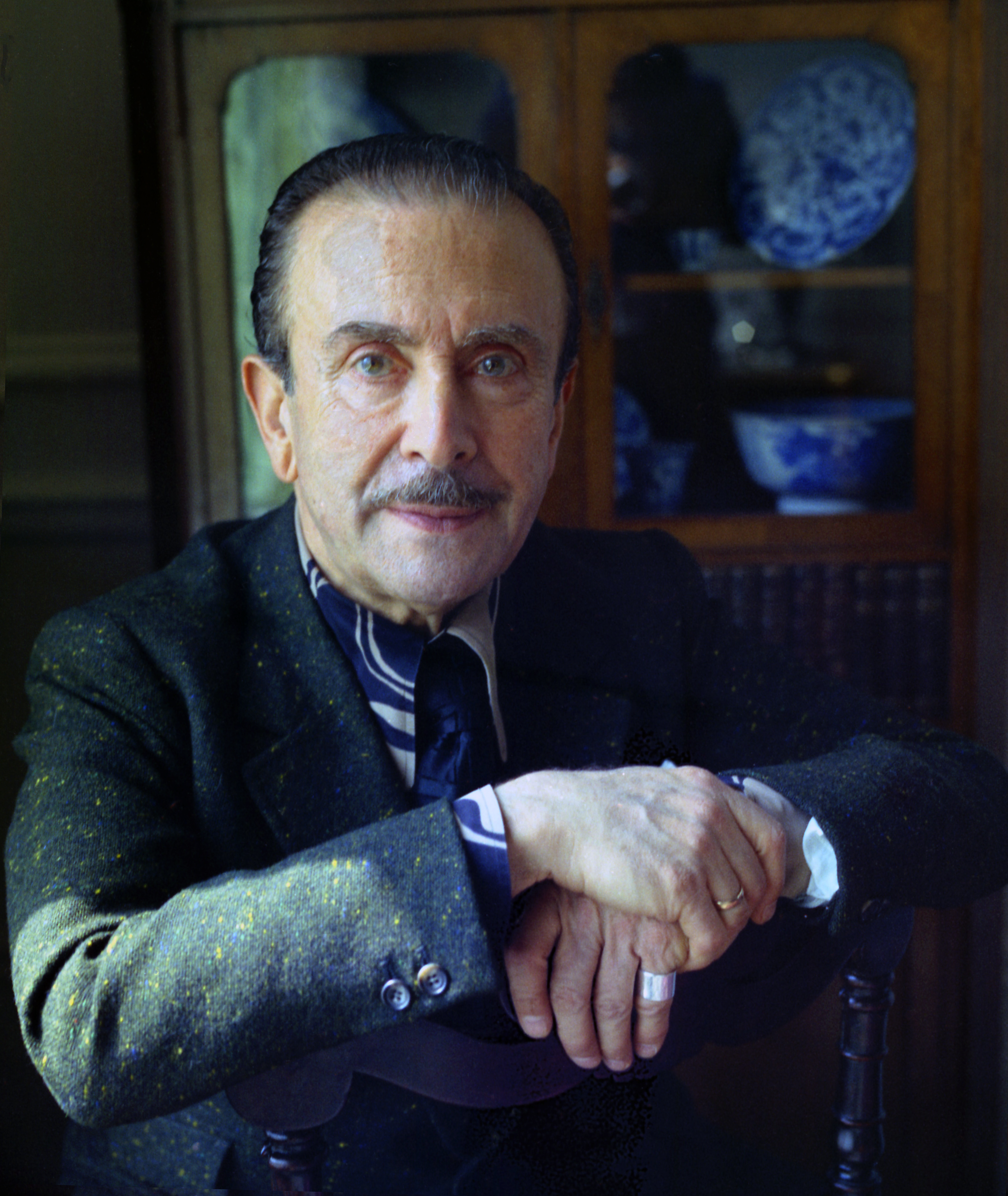
Claudio Arrau, a great pianist of the 20th century

Since the beginning of the Chilean republic, the need for highly trained musicians in educational institutions and in the classical music scene was evident. Initially, this need was fulfilled by artists coming from nearby Peru (Viceroyalty of Peru), both former important viceroyalties of Spain. In 1823, a wave of professional musicians came to Chile, including: Bartolome Filomeno and Jose Bernardo Alzedo from Lima, Peru; and the Spanish musician Isidora Zegers.

From 1900 onwards, music began to take a more central place in Chilean society. In 1912 the "Orchestral Society of Chile" was created and, over the next year, performed the nine symphonies of Beethoven, published the journal "La Orquesta" (The Orchestra), and debuted performances of Bach. Once the influential families got involved in the music scene, musicians' reputation in society started to change - previously seen as undesirable, or just entertainers, they started to be viewed as an important part of culture, and having musical knowledge became essential for the cultured person. The most prolific period of classic music in Chile began in the 1950s, with the founding of several projects aiming to educate, promote and research music, along with the implementation of educational reforms and the foundation of Youth and Children's Orchestras - like that created in the city of La Serena, led by conductor and composer Jorge Peña Hen. This process continued until 1973 when political repression hit culture and music across the board. The music industry, live performances, the media, and even musical education were affected, with musical education officially suppressed as a mandatory high school subject. One of the most traditional classical music events in Chile is the "Semanas musicales de Frutillar" (Frutillar musical weeks) in the southern city of Frutillar in Los Lagos Region (Region of the Lakes). The festival take place between January and February every year, and consists of 40 or more classical concerts performed by both Chilean and international artists. The construction of a new venue, the Teatro del Lago (Lake Theatre) which opened in 2010, has given the festival a boost, providing space for more performances and larger audiences. Since the 1990s, classical music has slowly recovered its place in Chilean culture and education, with projects like "FOJI" (the Foundation for Youth and Children's Orchestras), a non-profit organization that works to form orchestras and educate young people in several cities around Chile. Their programme reaches more than 12,000 teens and children every year, and their orchestras perform concerts that reach an audience of almost a million. Among the best known Chilean classical composers are José Zapiola Cortés, Enrique Soro and Pedro Humberto Allende. Allende put special effort to include some elements of Chilean tradition and folklore in his work, with works such as the symphonic poem "La Voz de las Calles" (The Voice of the Streets); "Doce Tonadas para Piano" (Twelve Tunes for Piano); and the "Concierto Sinfónico para Violoncello y Orquesta" (Symphonic Concerto for Cello and Orchestra), whose rhythmic richness was praised by Claude Debussy. Other important Chilean composers include Vicente Bianchi known for his compositions based on Pablo Neruda poems; Alfonso Leng, one of the most influential Chilean classical composers with a mystic and romantic style influenced by Wagnerian Post-romanticism; Luis Advis Vitaglich, known by his work ("Cantata de Santa Maria de Iquique"); Carlos Riesco; Domingo Santa Cruz Wilson; Roberto Falabella Correa; Nina Frick Ajenjo; Carlos Isamitt; Juan Orrego-Salas; Alfonso Letelier; Gustavo Becerra-Schmidt; Sergio Ortega; Leon Schidlowsky; Leni Alexander; Fernando García; Juan Allende-Blin; Cirilo Vila; Santiago Vera-Rivera; Andrés Alcalde; René Amengual; Próspero Bisquertt; Gabriel Brncic; Salvador Candiani; Acario Cotapos; Alejandro Guarello; Hans Helfritz; María Elena Hurtado; Tomás Lefever; Eduardo Maturana; Claudio Spies; Jorge Urrutia Blondel and Darwin Vargas, among many others.

Among the most prominent conductors are Fernando Rosas Pfingsthorn, Armando Carvajal, Juan Pablo Izquierdo, Sebastián Errázuriz and Víctor Tevah. One of the best-known performers is pianist Claudio Arrau, known for his vast repertoire spanning from baroque to 20th-century composers, especially Beethoven, Schubert, Chopin, Schumann, Liszt and Brahms. He is widely considered one of the greatest pianists of the twentieth century. Other great include Rosita Renard, Oscar Gacitúa Weston, Roberto Bravo, Elena Waiss, Elisa Alsina, Liza Chung, Alfredo Perl and currently Valentín Trujillo, who has interpreted a repertoire of classical as well as popular music, and is well known for taking part in television programmes.

Today, Chilean classical music has had a strong boost thanks to the efforts of the International Society for Chilean Music (SIMUC) and outstanding performers such as Luis Orlandini, Eulogio Dávalos Llanos, Nicolas Emilfork, Romilio Orellana, Carlos Pérez, Cristián Alvear Montecino and Juan Antonio Escobar. These have had a significant influence on the work of younger composers, such as: Juan Antonio Sánchez, Antonio Restucci and Horacio Salinas, who have moved beyond their classical education to incorporate folk and fusion music.

== See also ==
- Music of Easter Island
- New Chilean cumbia
- Chilean Electronic Music
- Chilean rock
- Youth and Children's Orchestras Foundation of Chile
- Nueva Canción Chilena
