= Darwin Vargas =

Chilean composer (1925–1988)

Darwin Vargas (March 8, 1925 – April 8, 1988) was a Chilean composer and choral conductor. His compositional style was influenced by Chilean folk music and he often used modal tonalities within his works. His own beliefs in Christian mysticism influenced his compositional style as well; particularly in his sacred choral works which exhibit a reflective lyrical sensibility.

== Life and career ==
Born Darwin Horacio Vargas-Wallis in Talagante, Chile on March 8, 1925, Vargas studied at the Conservatorio Nacional de Música (Chile) (also known as the Santiago Conservatory) at the University of Chile. His teachers at the conservatory included Domingo Santa Cruz Wilson, Jorge Urrutia Blondel, and Juan Orrego-Salas.

While a student at the conservatory, Vargas began conducting choruses in Santiago. In 1956 he was appointed assistant conductor of the choir at the Pontifical Catholic University of Chile; an ensemble directed by Orrego-Salas. From 1955–1962 he taught on the music faculty at the Talagante Seminary. He then taught at the Gonzalez Academy, Santiago (1964–1968) and the Valparaíso Naval School (music history, 1971), before returning to the Pontifical Catholic University of Chile as a professor of counterpoint and composition in 1972. He remained in this latter post until his death on April 8, 1988, in Santiago at the age of 63.

Vargas won several prizes for his music compositions at festivals in his native country. He wrote several journal articles which were published in Revista musical chilena and La libertad.

== Partial list of works ==
=== Art songs ===
- Cantos del hombre, baritone and orchestra (1960; uses poems by César Vallejo)
- Canciones para Georgeanne, mezzo-soprano and piano (1972; uses poems by Hugo Montes)

=== Choral ===
- Cantata de cámara, soprano and alto soloists, SATB chorus, and orchestra (1954)
- Ecce sacerdos magnus, TTBB chorus and organ (1961)
- Stabat mater, soprano and alto soloists, treble chorus, and organ (1961)
- 3 coros sacros (Three Sacred Choruses), SATB chorus (1961)
- En el país de los dos rios, tenor, baritone, and bass soloists; TTBB chorus; orchestra (1967)

=== Orchestral ===
- Obertura para tiempos de adviento (1958)
- Meditation Symphony (1965)
