= Enrique Soro Barriga =

Chilean composer

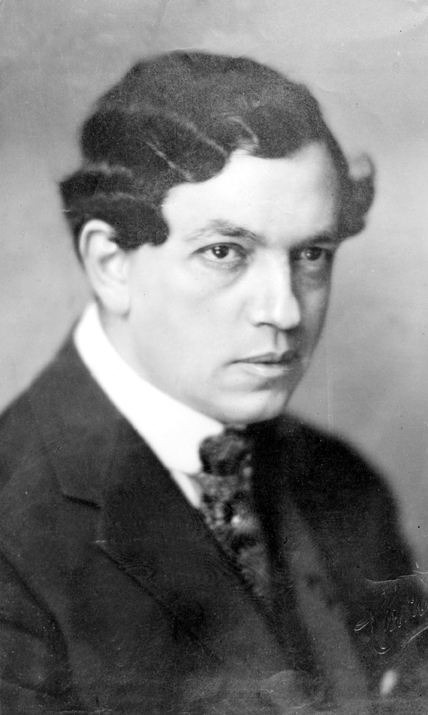
- Enrique Soro
- Born: July 15, 1884; Concepción, Chile
- Died: December 3, 1954 (aged 70); Santiago de Chile, Chile
- Occupations: Composer and pianist
- Known for: Composer of the first symphony in Chile

Enrique Soro Barriga (July 15, 1884 – December 03, 1954) was a Chilean composer and pianist. He won the National Prize of Art of Chile in 1948.

Considered one of the first Chilean symphonists, he carried out his first studies in Concepción with Clotilde de la Barra (piano) and Domenico Brescia (harmony and counterpoint). With a scholarship from the Chilean Senate, he left, in 1898, to study at the Royal Conservatory of Milan, one of the most important in the world at that time. He graduated from this place in 1904, winning the Grand Prize for Composition. From there he toured Italy and France.

Together with the musician Luigi Stefano Giarda, he soon became a professor of harmony and counterpoint at the National Conservatory of Music of Chile (Conservatorio Nacional de Música de Chile), where he quickly became its deputy director (1907) and then director, composition professor and piano teacher (1919), remaining linked to this institution for almost two decades. He was a teacher of: Domingo Santa Cruz, Juan Allende-Blin, Nino Marcelli, Héctor Melo, Juan Casanova Vicuña and Roberto Puelma.

He premiered and presented his works in Europe, the United States and Latin America; He recorded master rolls for the Aeolian Company, records for Columbia and managed to get a 50-year contract with the Schirmer publishing house.

Recognized as a great improviser on the piano, his life was linked with great personalities of the time, such as Pau Casals, Vincent D'Indy, Pietro Mascagni, Ignacy Paderewski, Giacomo Puccini, Maurice Ravel and Camille Saint-Saëns, among others.

From a musical point of view, his work is rooted in the classical-romantic tradition, with a recognized style immersed in classical forms, full of a spontaneous lyrical sense. The researcher Raquel Bustos recognizes two periods in his work: from his beginnings until 1911 (beginning period), and, subsequently, from 1911 until his death (maturity period). He wrote few works with vernacular material in its natural state, the most performed being Tres aires chilenos (1942).

== Relevant works ==
- Sinfonía Romántica (1923)
- Preludios Sinfonicos (1936)
- Tres Aires Chilenos (1942)
- Gran Concierto para Piano y Orquesta en Re Menor (1918)

== Awards and nominations ==
His honors, positions and awards were multiple, among which stands out having been vice president of the Society of Chilean Composers (Sociedad de Compositores Chilenos).

- In 1904 he won the Grand Prix for High Composition from the Royal Conservatory of Milan.
- In 1910 he obtained the Gold Medal for the Centennial Anthem of Chile.
- In 1917 he obtained the Gold Medal for the "Himno a la Bandera Chilena"
- In 1922 he was appointed member of the Society of Composers of Paris.
- In 1948 he obtained the National Art Prize, Musical mention.

Naxos has recorded a disc of his works, comprising the following: Danza Fantástica, 3 Aires chilenos, Andante appassionato (version for orchestra), and Sinfonía romántica.
