= Carlos Isamitt Alarcón =

Chilean painter and composer

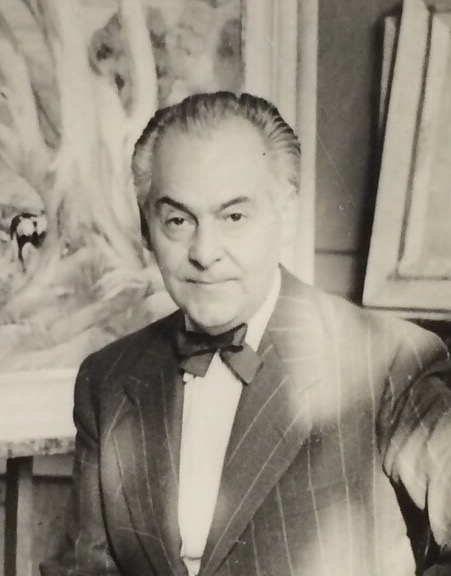
- Born: March 13, 1887; Rengo, Chile
- Died: July 6, 1974 (aged 87)

Carlos Isamitt Alarcón (March 13, 1887 – July 6, 1974) was a Chilean painter and composer. He received the National Prize of Art of Chile in 1965. He is a member of Chile's Generación del 13.

== Early life ==
Isamitt was born in Rengo on 13 March 1887. He studied violin starting at age five. He attended the José Abelardo Núñez Normal School in Santiago and obtained his teaching degree. He became professor at the Pedagogical Institute at the University of Chile, now the Metropolitan University of Educational Sciences. He continued musical studies with Pedro Humberto Allende and Domenico Brescia. He also studied painting with Julio Fossa Calderón and Pedro Lira at the Catholic University and Fernando Álvarez Sotomayer at the School of Fine Arts.

In 1913 he began the Chuchunco Quartet along with Allende. The group continued to perform until 1924.

In 1924 he went to Europe where he traveled for three years to study pedagogical techniques. In 1925 he attended the International Exhibition of Modern Decorative and Industrial Arts in Paris as a representative of Chile. There he met Carlos Lavín, another Chilean composer. Lavín shared information about the Araucanian world, which greatly interested Isamitt. Isamitt later created music with inspiration from Araucanian and Creole folktales. One example is El Pozo de Oro (1942) based on a legend from the Maule Region.

== Career ==
In 1927 Isamitt was appointed professor at the School of Fine Arts at the University of Chile. In 1928 he became Director of the School and the Museum of Fine Arts. While there he founded the School of Applied Arts. He also founded the Talca Museum. In 1928 he was appointed Director General of Artistic Education, a part of the Ministry of Education.

Isamitt created several reforms in Chilean education. He modified curriculum to create coherence in musical education from preschool to higher education. He strove to improve the ability to teach music for teachers trained in normal schools. His research of the indigenous people of Chile prompted him to incorporate that knowledge into schools. He wanted them to be part of the national culture.

In 1947 he was a founder of the Santiago Museum of Contemporary Art. That year he became head of the Pedagogy Section of the Institute of Musical Research at the University of Chile.

=== Composer ===
Isamitt's compositional style is highly eclectic. He "blends elements from Impressionism, as well as German Expressionism and the Vienna School... to which he added rhythms, melodic structures, and harmonic elaborations from Mapuche music."

He was part of the founding group of the National Association of Composers of Chile (ANC) in 1936.

=== Painter ===
As a painter, Isamitt shared many traits with the "Generación del 13" though he was less prone to subtlety. His obituary in El Mercurio explains "Sometimes, as in the Lebu landscape, the forms convulse and the brush seems to place color in fleeting, stark, and uncompromising ways."

=== Researcher ===
Throughout his career, Isamitt studied indigenous music and mestizo folklore. He travelled regularly. He began research in Tierra del Fuego, then went to the Chiloé Archipelago. He carried out much of his research in the 1930s in the Araucanía Region. When he became an academic at the Institute of Musical Research in the 1940s his research was focused on the south-central part of the country.

He is especially known for his research working with the Mapuche people. His studies are some of the most comprehensive in regard to traditions, repertoires, and musical instruments. He was considered a leader in the "indianismo musical" movement.

Isamitt was labeled an "indigenist" which was notable as interest in ethnicity was not common in Chile. His perspectives led to his desire to make Mapuche culture part of the nation. Isamitt's approach, using ethnographic notes, drawings, watercolors, and musical scores, was not the usual scientific route of the time. He brought together the aesthetic and humanistic elements that other researchers missed.

== Awards ==
In 1917 he received First Medal in the Official Salon with his painting Sunrise on Lake Llanquihue. In 1933 his composition Friso Araucano won First Prize at the composition competition at the University of Chile. In 1965 he became a permanent member of the Chilean Academy of Fine Arts. In 1967 he received the gold medal from the Institute of Musical Research at the University of Chile.
