= Juan Orrego-Salas =

Chilean composer (1919–2019)

Juan Antonio Orrego-Salas (January 18, 1919 – November 24, 2019) was a Chilean composer, musicologist, music critic, and academic.

== Life and career ==
Born Juan Antonio Orrego-Salas in Santiago on January 18, 1919, Orrego-Salas studied at the Conservatorio Nacional de Música (Chile), the music school of the University of Chile, in his native city where he was a pupil of Pedro Humberto Allende (composition) and Domingo Santa Cruz Wilson (composition). He also earned of Bachelor of Arts in architecture in addition to earning his diploma in music composition from the University of Chile.

After completing his degrees, Orrego-Salas joined the faculty of Conservatorio Nacional de Música where he was a lecturer in music history, and he simultaneously joined the faculty of the Pontifical Catholic University of Chile where he founded the university choir in 1938. Grants from the Rockefeller Foundation and a Guggenheim Fellowship enabled him to pursue further studies in the United States from 1944 through 1946. During this period he studied music composition with Aaron Copland and Randall Thompson and musicology with Paul Henry Lang and George Herzog.

In 1947 Orrego-Salas was appointed professor of music composition at the University of Chile; and was awarded the title Professor Extraordinario at that institution in 1953. He concurrently served as editor of the Revista musical chilena, a position he began in 1949, and began working as a music critic for El Mercurio in 1950. A second Guggenheim Fellowship awarded in 1954 brought Orrego-Salas back to the United States in 1954–1956. After returning to Chile he served concurrently as director of El Instituto de Extensión Musical at the Conservatorio Nacional de Música and as dean of the music school at the Pontifical Catholic University of Chile. His students in Chile included composer Sylvia Soublette.

In 1961, Orrego-Salas permanently relocated to the United States to work at Indiana University Bloomington, where he co-founded the Latin American Music Center (LAMC). One of his students at IU's Jacobs School of Music was composer Ricardo Lorenz who succeeded him as director of the LAMC. In 1992, he was the inaugural winner of Chile's National Prize for Musical Arts.

He died in Bloomington, Indiana, on November 24, 2019.
