= La Marraqueta =

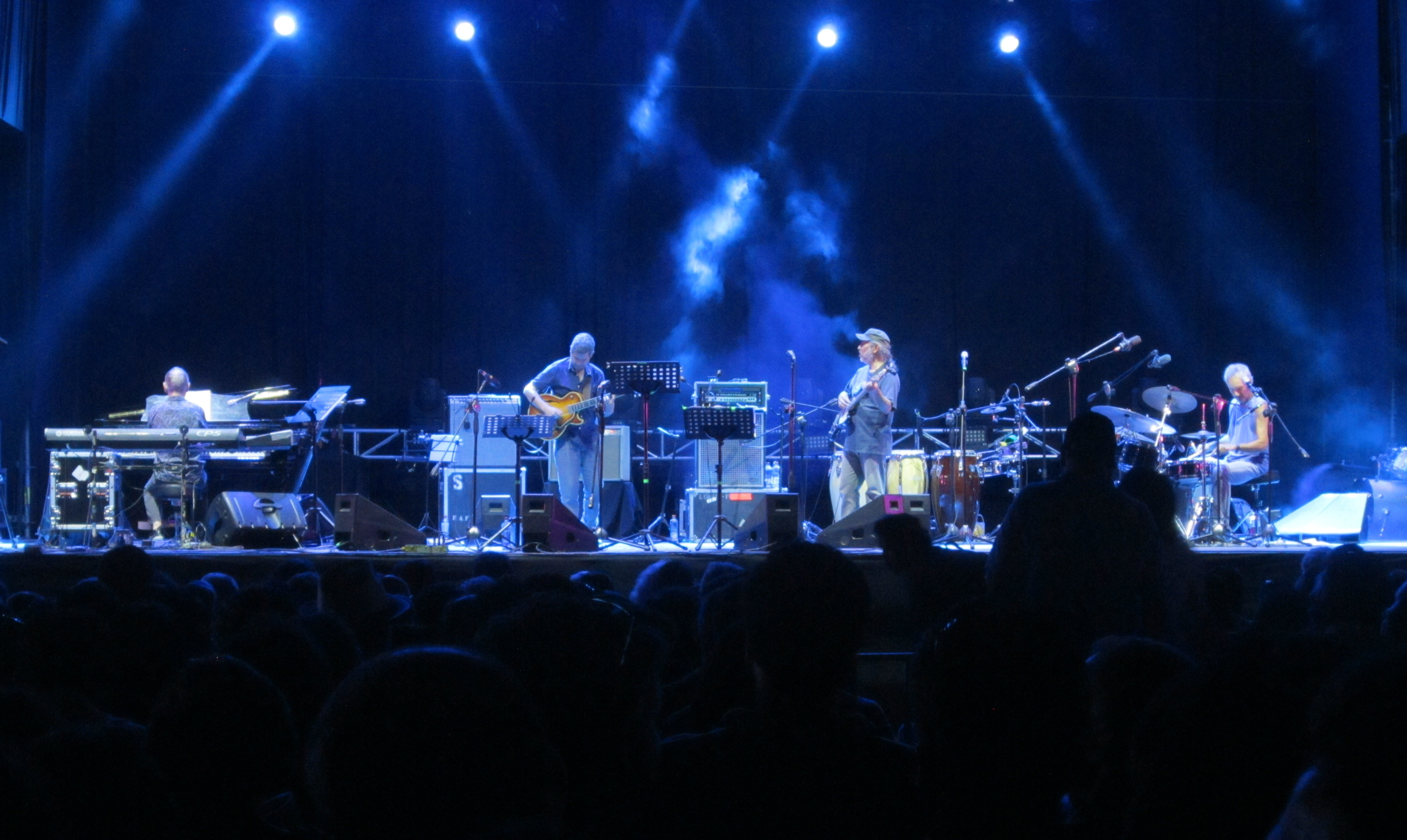
- La Marraqueta at the Festival Internacional Providencia Jazz 2017

Background information
- Origin: Santiago, Chile
- Genres: Jazz, jazz fusion, jazz rock, ethno jazz, world music
- Years active: 1992–present
- Website: lamarraqueta.com

La Marraqueta is a Chilean jazz fusion band formed in Santiago, with a mixture of folk music and Mapuche music, as well as rock. They have been called as Jazz Fusion Criollo (Chilean creole jazz fusion).

It started in the year 1992 from the definitive extinction of Cometa, a jazz band that had as members three of the current members of this band; Andrés Pollak, Pablo Lecaros and Pedro Greene. They were joined by guitarists Jorge Díaz and Mauricio Rodríguez. Its existence has been one of the most valuable proposals in the history of Chilean jazz, since it proposes the encounter between jazz improvisation and the concept of music with folkloric roots.

== History ==
While they remained in Cometa, Pablo Lecaros and Pedro Greene had worked with the singer Isabel Parra on one of their first national tours, once their ban on entering the country had been lifted. This event was decisive, since it connected both jazz players with the Chilean root song. From then on, both soloists were immersed in a research work of these two musical branches that showed no greater kinship.

La Marraqueta was started as a music workshop in 1992 and in 1994 it entered the programs of the Jazz Club with its portfolio of original creations framed within what was called "Creole fusion". Pedro Greene had come to work with the guitarist Edgardo Riquelme in an electric intervention of the song Gracias a la vida by Violeta Parra, while Pablo Lecaros had directed the Macondo group, with which recorded his Tonada para la pachamama. This melody was soon to become one of the maximum pieces of the new fusion ensemble.

La Marraqueta recorded her debut album (La Marraqueta, 1995) as a trio, using the same structure as a basic jazz rhythm section (piano-contrabass-drums), although this time electrified (keyboards-bass-percussions ). This marked his staging and the sound profile that would characterize it for years. Consequently, La Marraqueta was strongly framed in the music developed by the plugged jazz models of Herbie Hancock, Chick Corea and especially by the ensemble Weather Report. From that point of view, the step the band took to record their second album was key.

In 1997 he joined Mauricio Rodríguez (leader of Almendra Trío , band that also featured Pablo Lecaros on bass), who recorded the guitar parts of the new plaque. Soon he was replaced by Jorge Díaz, his most stable man in the six strings. The Marraqueta began thereafter a series of extensive presentations at festivals in Mexico, Argentina, Peru and Venezuela, and simultaneously edited Sayhueque 2000. It was a work that generated an intense musical search and consolidated that definitive sound miscegenation that is so typical of the group. Elements rescued from root music, rhythms and ancestral sounds of the Mapuche people, peasant tunes and Huaynos from the Andes were incorporated.

The third album, La Marraqueta III 2005, had a composition work led by Pollak. He had the participation of the emerging voice of Paz Court.

Currently, there is recognition from the national public and participation in festivals and international concerts.

The quartet is defined from an original and unpublished base, expressed in a Creole fusion that emphasizes musical elements investigated and rescued by the same members of the band from the roots of national folklore. From there they search for a universal sound that, however, is also influenced by ethnic melodies, Afro-Latin music, rock, jazz and European contemporary music.

In 2010 they toured to the United States to the San Jose Jazz Festival, where they played with musicians such as George Clinton, Maceo Parker and Tower of Power.

In January 2017 they participate in the International Providence Jazz Festival in Santiago, along with Matt Wilson Quintet and Dave Liebman, where they also announce the beginning of the production of the more than once postponed fourth album. The album was finally released in May 2022 entitled Astral.

== Members ==
=== Current ===
- Andrés Pollak: (1992 – ) piano, keyboards and voice
- Pablo Lecaros: (1992 – ) electric bass and voice
- Pedro Greene: (1992 – ) drums and percussion
- Mauricio Rodríguez (1997 – 1999 y 2005 – ) electric guitar

=== Past ===
- Jorge Díaz (2000–2004): electric guitar

== Discography ==
- 1994 – La Marraqueta (Autoedición)
- 1999 – Sayhueque (Fondart)
- 2005 – La Marraqueta III (Autoedición)
- 2022 - Astral

== See also ==
- Marraqueta, a bread considered a national and staple dish in Chile
