= Pedro Humberto Allende =

Chilean composer (1885–1959)

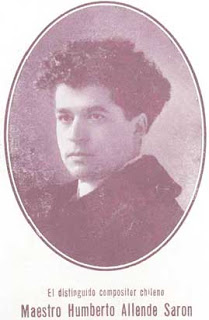
Pedro Humberto Allende

Pedro Humberto Allende Sarón (July 29, 1885 – August 17, 1959) was one of the most important Chilean composers of the twentieth century. In 1945 he was the first Chilean musician to obtained the prestigious National Prize of Art of Chile.

== Biography ==
Allende was born on July 29, 1885, in Santiago. His first contact with music was due to his older brother, Juan, who became a professor at the National Conservatory of Chile. Allende himself later enrolled there in 1899. He studied under teachers Agustín Reyes, Aurelio Silva, Carlos Debuysère, Domenico Brescia, Luis Esteban Giarda, and Federico Stöber. He learned music theory, violin, piano, cello, harmony, counterpoint, fugue and composition. In 1908, he graduated, having specialized in harmony, composition, violin, and song, and obtained a professorship. Two years later he was the prize winner at the musical section of the Centenario de Chile.

In 1911, he traveled to Europe, with a grant from the Chilean government, to perfect his musical knowledge. He visited Portugal, Spain, Italy, Switzerland, Germany, the Netherlands, and Belgium. On his return, he suggested certain reforms that were introduced in the National Conservatory. He soon made another trip to Europe, giving lectures on music in Germany, Spain, and France.

Beyond his teaching he was also the founder and President of the National Association of Composers. He participated in the Bach Society

He had a long, respected career both as a composer and as a professor at the National Conservatory in Chile. His compositions drew inspiration from Chilean folk themes as well as the music of the Mapuche. His music was appreciated by noted composers worldwide, and he received letters of admiration from Claude Debussy, Florent Schmitt, and Federico Mompou. His best known works are:

- La Voz de las Calles
- Doce Tonadas para Piano
- Concierto para violoncello y orquesta
