= Domingo Santa Cruz Wilson =

Chilean composer (1899–1937)

- Born: July 5, 1899; La Cruz, Chile
- Died: January 6, 1987 (aged 87)
- Education: University of Chile
- Occupations: Composer, music educator, lawyer

Domingo Santa Cruz Wilson (July 5, 1899 – January 6, 1987) was a Chilean composer, music educator and lawyer. He won the National Prize of Art of Chile in 1951.
