= Chilean electronic music =

Chilean electronic music refers to the electronic music genre and its subgenres produced in Chile or by Chileans.

== History ==
The origins of electronic music in Chile can be found as far back as 1958, when physicist Werner Meyer-Eppler visited Chile. As a result of his visit, experimentation with electronic music gained support from the scientific community and an electronic music laboratory was established.

In 1959, Jose Vicente Asuar published a thesis entitled "Generación mecánica y electrónica del sonido musical" (Mechanical and Electronic Generation of Musical Sound), and to demonstrate his thesis he composed "Variaciones espectrales" (Spectral Variations), the first piece of electronic music in Chile.

In 1966, at the Universidad Católica, Samuel Claro released his second electronic music album, Estudio N°1.

Asuar released Estudio Aletorio in 1962 and Ambientes Sonoros in 1967. Both records were released in Germany (Karlsruhe) and Venezuela (Caracas).

In 1968, Tomás Lefever composed 19 electronic tracks and released Klesis, a compilation album containing works by Amenábar and Asuar.

It is not clear when exactly the electronic music movement as it is known today reached Chile. At the beginning of the 1990s a small underground movement had emerged, with DJs such as Cristian Vogel, Ricardo Villalobos, Matias Aguayo and Sergio Orrego, the opening of the specialist store Background, and small scale events like “Barracudas” in 1992, “Corriente Alterna” (1993), “Distrito Distinto” (1993), “Background” (1994), “Avanzada multimedia” (1994), “Frontera Final” (1995) and “Spandex Parties” taking place through the 1990s. However, most commentators see the true birth of electronica in Chile at the Alacran Peninsula in the city of Arica, in an event that took place during the solar eclipse of November 1994.

The solar eclipse took place on November 3, 1994, with excellent views available in northern Chilean cities such as Arica, drawing astronomers from around the world to observe the rare phenomenon in the area's uniquely clear skies. A group of electronica fans and DJs decided to use the eerie eclipse landscape as a backdrop to host Chile's first rave. The event was sponsored by the German clothing manufacturer Pash and took place outdoors in the Scorpion Peninsula, opposite to the historic Morro de Arica. Ravers could observe the eclipse and wait for its shadow to pass, with electronic music as a soundtrack. DJs who took part in the rave included John Acquaviva, Richie Hawtin, Ricardo Villalobos, Derrick May, Pascal, Siddhartha and Adrian.

Though it was a small event, the Alacran rave has gained near legendary status in Chile and has become a landmark in the country's electronic scene. Since then, the scene has grown fast and massive events have taken place in many of Chile's major cities, including “C[C2] reamfields”, “Sensation White” (a spin-off from Amsterdam’s “Sensation”), and Ultra Music, an event that first appeared in Miami.

In the last decade, techno and house music, mostly inspired by the movement in Berlin, has grown in Santiago. These underground scene has been recorded by labels like Comeme and Pirotecnia with stars from the scene like Alejandro Paz and Mamacita.

The International Society for Chilean Music (SIMUC) has a podcast called MEC dedicated exclusively to Chilean electronic music. The first episode was aired on September 30, 2016.

== Well-known artists ==
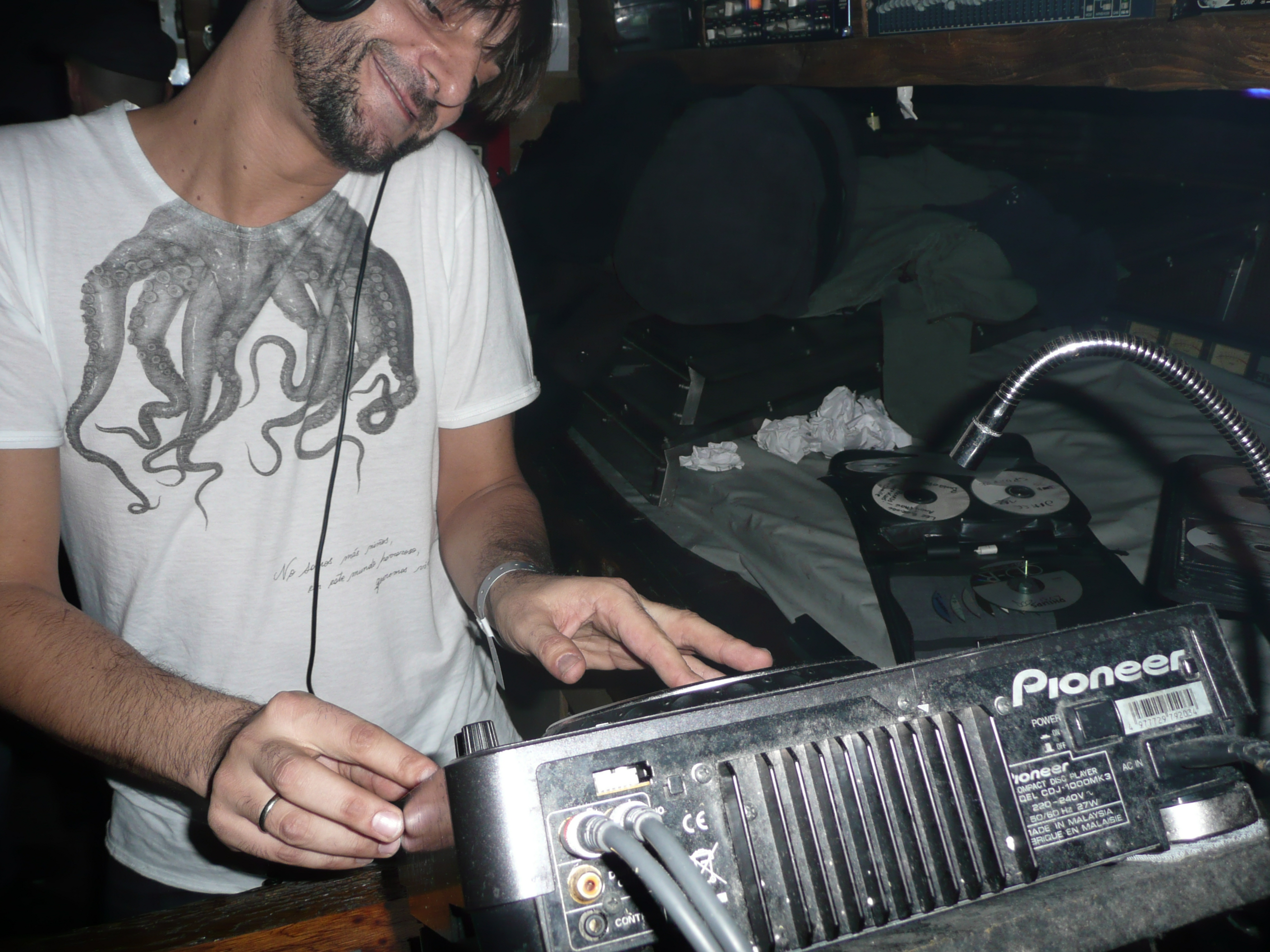
Villalobos at Fabric

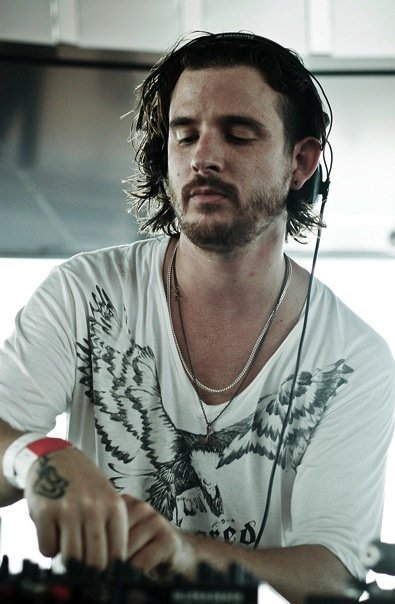
Lucien N Luciano also known as Luciano (2007)

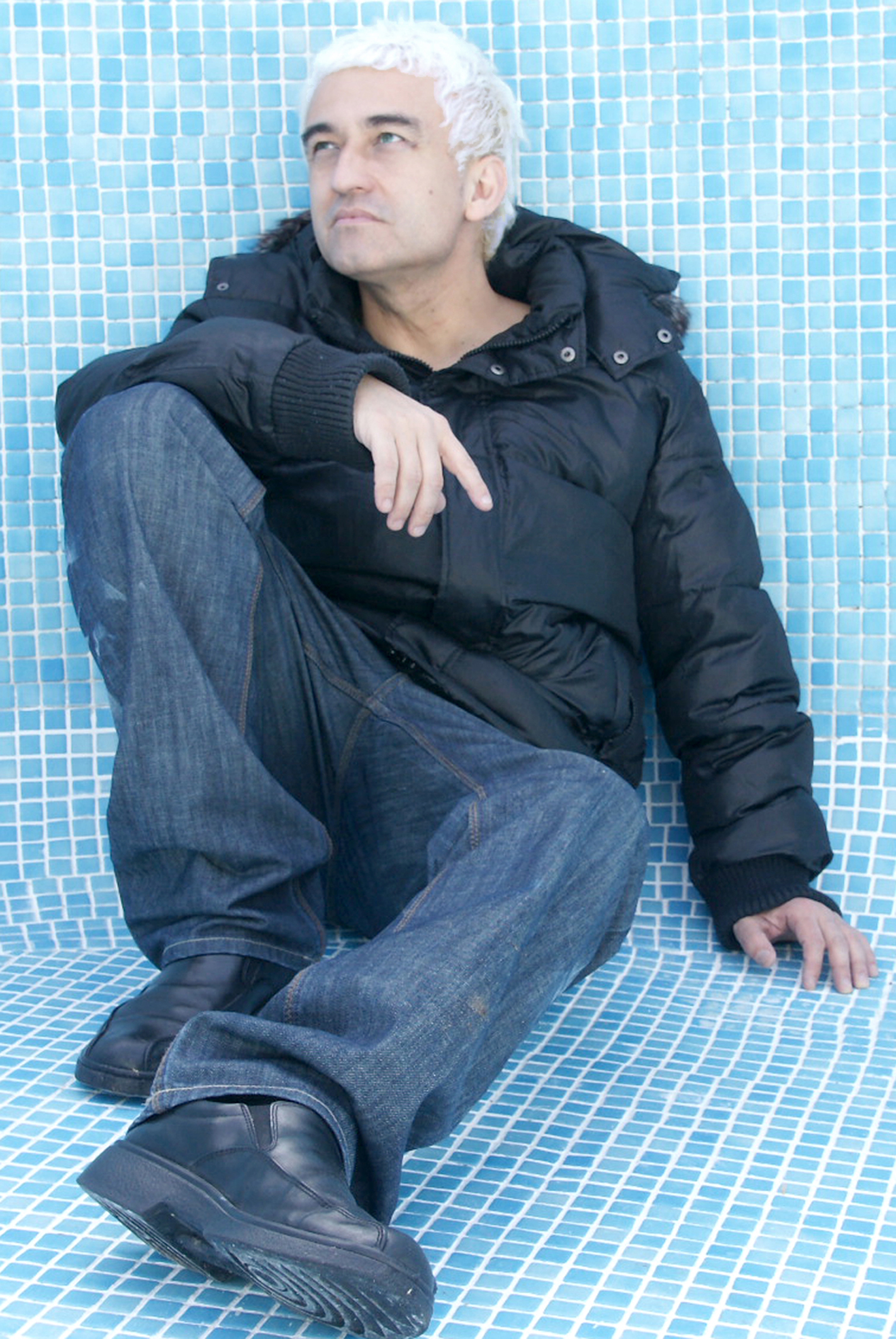
Jorge Gonzalez, the leader and voice of Los Prisioneros

- Ricardo Villalobos: Born in Santiago, Chile and raised in Berlin, Villalobos is well known for his work in the minimal techno and microhouse genres, and is one of the most significant figures in today's minimal techno scene.
- Andrés Bucci: One of the three Bucci brothers who are all well-known electronic music producers. Andrés began his career in 1996 while living in Germany, and the influence of the Berlin scene is noticeable in his work. He formed part of the group Plan V, where he worked with Gustavo Ceratti (Soda Stereo), Christian Powditch and Guillermo Ugarte, and also worked with Kate Simko in the duo Detalles.
- Cristian Vogel: Born in Chile, Vogel spent a good part of his career living in Brighton, England, and is now based in Barcelona. Vogel is an important techno producer, although his experimental style goes beyond the usual standards of techno.
- Danieto: Danieto – real name Daniel Nieto – is a composer and engineer and one of the founders of the record label “Impar”. He is an experimental electronic musician known for his minimalistic, harmonious style.
- Latin Bitman: José Antonio Bravo, one half of the duo Bitman and Roban (a play on Batman and Robin), is a popular DJ, producer and composer of electronic music and funk. Latin Bitman is perhaps the most popular Chilean electronic artist outside Chile. He has a successful solo career and has collaborated with many other artists from different genres, such as Sen Dog and Eric Bobo from Cypress Hill, Francisca Valenzuela and Anita Tijoux.
- Luciano: Born Lucien Nicolet, Luciano has also been known as Lucien 'n' Luciano and DJ Magi-k during the 90s, and in Europe as Sense Club (in partnership with Ricardo Villalobos) and Monne Autumne (with Pier Bucci and Argenis Brito). Although he began DJing in Chile, for most of his career he has been based in Germany and Switzerland, where he was born. His style combines techno and minimalist house. He is a permanent DJ at Geneva's Weetamix and has played in many clubs around Europe.
- Alexi Delano: Born in Chile and raised in Sweden, with a career spanning more than two decades, Delano's music strikes a balance between minimalist and dark techno. He has released five albums and numerous other records.
- Pier Bucci: Born in Chile and based in Germany since 2002, Pier combines Latin rhythms with German electronic style. In the past, he has taken part in projects such as Skipsapiens with Danieto, Monne Automne, Mambotur, Luciano (Lucien-n-Luciano) and Plan V, with his brother Andrés. His first solo album, “Familia” (2005), included collaborations with Macha (Lafloripondio) and Armelle Pioline (Holden). His second album, “Amigo” (2010), featured Jorge González as well as Macha and Pioline.
- Chica Paula: Born in Santiago, DJ and producer Paula is currently based in Berlin and plays in the innovative musical collective Oceanclub[C3] and combines Ambient techno with house, techno and electro pop. She is the sister of producer Dandy Jack (Martín Schopf) and DJ Adrián (Adrián Schopf).
- Jorge González: Widely known as the vocalist of Los Prisioneros, one of the most influential bands of Chile and Latin America, Gonzalez has experimented with electronic music since the beginning of his solo career and released his first album in partnership with Dandy Jack (Martín Schopf) under the moniker Gonzalo Martínez. The album, “Gonzalo Martínez y sus congas pensantes” (1997), was a mix of cumbia and techno. Later, Gonzalez formed “The Updates” with Loreto Otero, his then-wife, and released an album in 2008. The album's mixture of house, pop, 2-step, 8-bit, funk and rave received strong reviews in the European specialist media.
- Nicolas Jaar: A Chilean-American musician, Jaar was also the founder of his own record label and art house[C4], Clown & Sunset, and its successor “Other People”. Jaar's music is ruminative and emotional at only 100 BPM C5 (beats per minute) or less, far lower than the techno/house standards of 120–130 BPM.
- Humanfobia: Chilean Dark Electronic, Witch House music duo from Rancagua, City. Members: Sábila Orbe & Mist Spectra. Is one of the most popular and played artists on the netlabel scene of Chile. Also the most popular witch house music project of south america.
- Matias Aguayo: The youngest Chilean artist in the German electronic music scene, Aguayo mixes styles and genres as different as electronic, folk, reggae and country to create unique tracks. His first release in 1998 was a 12” called "U.O.A.A. Shake it!", in collaboration with Michael Mayer, and since then Aguayo has released five albums and has collaborated with many other artists.
- Dandy Jack – real name Martín Schopf - was born in Santiago and lives in Germany. Many of his projects combine techno and Latin sounds and rhythms. Schopf is the other half of the Chilean duos Gonzalo Martinez, with Jorge González, and “Ric Y Martin”, with Ricardo Villalobos. He is also part of the trio Sieg Über Die Sonne, with Lars Müller y Tobias Freund. Dandy Jack has released three original albums: “Dandy Jack and the Cosmic Trousers” (1996), “Dandy Jack and the Plastic Women” (1997) and “Los siete castigos” (2005), and has featured in more than 10 albums in collaboration with other musicians.
- Lorenzo Jaar: born August 26, 1993, in Talagante, Chile, is a photographer and audiovisual artist based in Santiago de Chile. After studying Audiovisual Communication, Lorenzo discovered the art of electronic music. Emerged in late 2019 and combines and mixing Ambient techno with house, techno, world music, electro pop, electronic, ambiental and downtempo elements. In December 2019, he released some tracks representing his personal journey to the music. First published were Space and El Cielo Está Rojo. Lorenzo dropped four new songs in 2020, Dancing on the Moon, Momotarō No Umiwashi, Signals and Reyaah. He's currently working on his first EP.
