= Andrés Bucci =

Chilean EDM producer

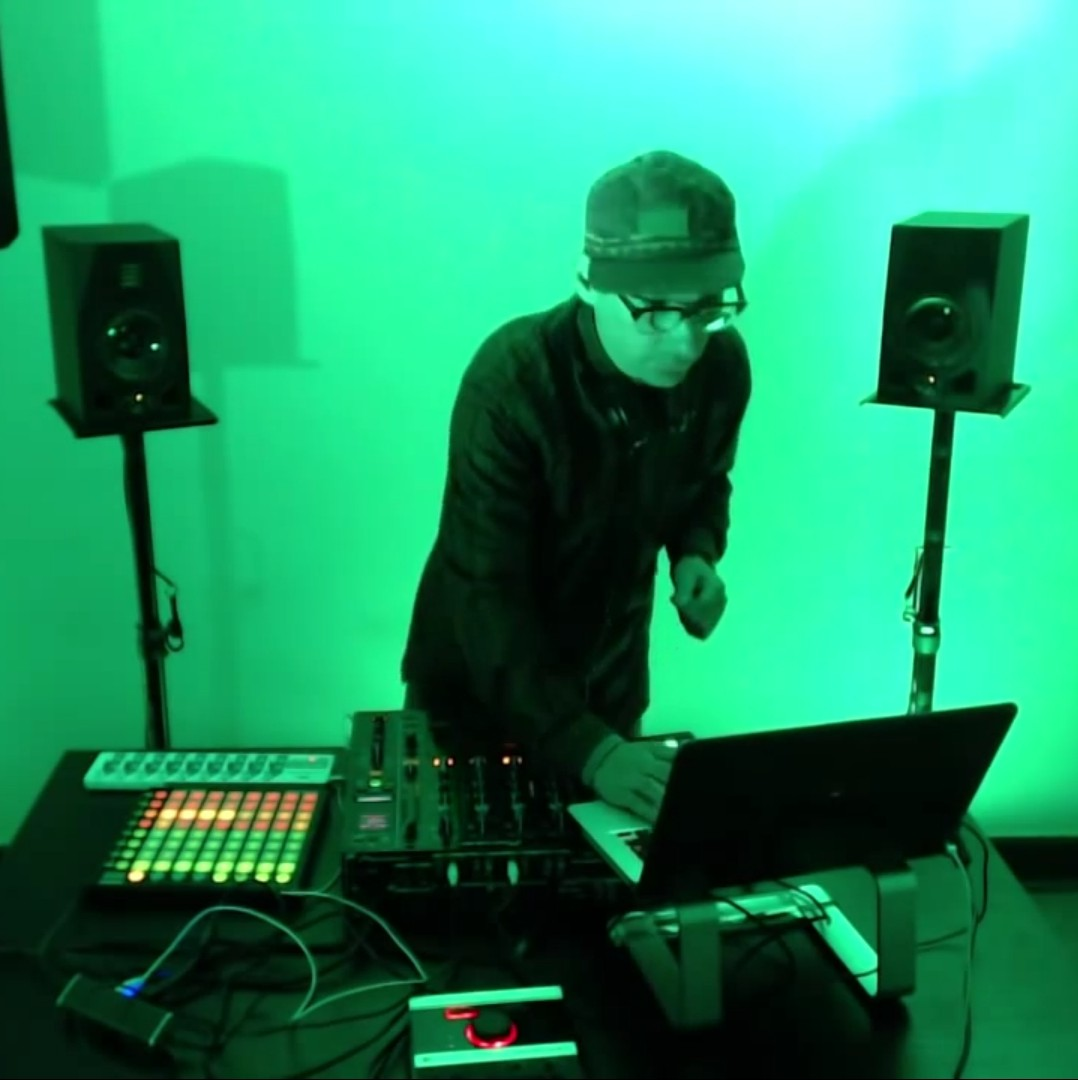

Background information
- Also known as: Bucci, Lil'Bucci, Osloer, Chord
- Born: Andrés Bucci
- Origin: Santiago de Chile, Chile
- Genres: Electronica
- Occupations: Disc jockey, record producer, musician
- Years active: 1996–present
- Labels: Hummingbird, Ruta 5, Traum Schallplaten, Horizontal, Impar, Cynosure
- Website: http://foldscheap.tumblr.com/ =http://simplethingsberlin.tumblr.com/

Andrés Bucci is a Chilean electronic music producer and DJ. He is known for his solo work as well as for his role as a member of Plan V. He is one of three Bucci brothers (Juan Pablo, Pier and Andrés), all DJs and electronic music producers.

Andrés Bucci began his career in 1996 while living in Germany, and the influence of the Berlin scene is noticeable in his work. He is a member of the group Plan V where he works with Gustavo Cerati (Soda Stereo), Christian Powditch and Guillermo Ugarte, has also worked with Kate Simko in project called "Detalles"., and with his brother Pier Bucci in a duo called Bucci.

== Career ==
Andrés Bucci was born in Santiago, Chile and grew up in the "Bucci Gallery" in the city centre. One of the few places that offered art exhibition space in the Chilean military regime, the Bucci Gallery was one of the cultural bastions of the last years of the dictatorship and welcomed emerging avant-garde painters as well as punk and 80s new wave musicians. In 1996, while living in Germany, Andrés met Jimi Tenor at the Kunsthaus Tacheles, an important art center where he rented a studio. They worked on some tracks together and Bucci realized he was able to produce music suitable for release. On a trip to his homeland of Chile, Andrés contacted his friend Christian Powditch and with him, along with Guillermo Ugarte and the Argentinean Gustavo Cerati (lead musician and voice of Soda Stereo), created in 1995 his first musical project, Plan V. The first album of the group "Plan V" (1995) was a success and introduced Chilean electronic music to major audiences, with their second album in 1998 bringing them popularity on both sides of the Andes. Alongside this, Andrés produced solo work under the pseudonym of Chord, performing in Chile and Argentina at venues such as Club La Feria, La Casa Club and Microman. In 1999, the label Ruta 5 (owned by Martin Schopf's Berlin based Chilean musician, aka Dandy Jack), invited Andrés to participate in the "Austral project", a compilation album of Chilean artists such as Atom Heart, Ricardo Villalobos, Luciano and Daniel Nieto (Danieto), released on Payola record label. In 2000, Andrés was invited to curate a Chilean art exhibition in Berlin's Bethanien Art Center. He integrated the exhibition with music, performing himself and sharing the stage with German musicians Stereo Total and Silvesterboy (Golden Citronen). During 2001, Andrés released his debut album under the pseudonym Chord, titled "Monochord". He also released many remixes for important South American artists such as Original Hamster, Chilean musicians Pánico, Bitman & Roban, and the Argentinian Gustavo Cerati, and continued performing live in Chile and Argentina. In 2002, he formed the duo "Detalles" with Kate Simko, a music student from Chicago, and released the album "Shapes of summer" for the German label Traum. They would later, in 2007, release "Micros morning" for the US label Kupei Musika. In 2003, Andrés performed as Chord at the MicroMutek festival in Valparaíso and in the same year, released an EP with his brother Pier for the WMF record label. The duo, known as "Bucci", debuted with their track "Dude" and came in at number 8 in the specialized De:Bug magazine chart, performing in several Berlin clubs. Also in 2003, Bucci appeared in the "Canción Electrónica" (Electronica Song) compilation album from Argentina's Indice Virgen Records and the "Colores Compilation" album from Mexico's Mil Records.

In 2004, Andrés performed with Detalles at the Mutek Festival in Chile where they were named one of the "next 100 most influential bands of the year" in the US by URB (magazine) URB magazine. In 2005, Bucci was invited to perform at Mutek Festival in Canada where his set received excellent reviews. From this point Bucci started to perform frequently in clubs around Europe.

In 2007, Andrés released his solo EP "Chocopanda", and performed with Bucci at the Raum Club in Barcelona, at the Synch Festival in Greece and at Watergate Club in Berlin. With Detalles, he performed at Mutek Festival in Canada and later at the Worldtronics Festival in Der Hause der Kulturen der Welt in Berlin, alongside other international artists. The same year he performed at Panorama Bar Berlin and Watergate Club to promote the EP "Andrés Bucci-Avec Style", released by Horizontal label owned by another Chilean producer Dinky. In 2008, he performed at Watergate Club and the Weekend Club in Berlin, at Unit Club in Tokyo and at T-Bar in London.

== Discography ==
As Andres Bucci

- Need More Casio Ep-Hummingbird Label-2013
- Jackin' Jungle Maruca Music-2013
- Mental Menthology - Hummingbird - 2012
- Unity Hood EP (12") – Hummingbird, 2011
- Avec Style EP (12") – Horizontal, 2008
- Chocopanda EP (12") – Kupei Musika, 2007
- Don Julio's Converseria EP (12") – Cynosure, 2005
- Badminton EP (12") – Cynosure, 2004
- Skip & Chord (12") – WMF Records 2003

=== Remixes ===
- Leonino / Jorge Gonzalez-We Should Be Friends Andres Bucci Remix - Hueso Records-2015
- Föllakzoid "Pulsar" Andres Bucci Rework - Sacred Bones Records -2014
- Miss Garrison Montana Andres Bucci Remix -2014
- Makers Of Sense, To The Warehouse Andres Bucci Remix -2012
- Antiguo Automata Mexicano "Surspacea Andres Bucci Xberg Noon Remix Static Dicsos-2011
- Edgar Jack&Lauren Chabon "She Was Underaged Dancer"- Andres Bucci Remix- Hummingbird Label -2010
- Tremolo Audio (CD), Transito (Beamer Mix By Andres Bucci) – Mil Records, 2008
- Derelikt (MP3, EP), Cunnilingus (Andres Bucci Remix) – 808, 2008
- Flavius E – Indicios (12", Ltd, EP), Ocres (Andres Bucci Remix) – Kupei Musika, 2007
- Gustavo Cerati – Reversiones / Siempre Es Hoy (2xCD), No Te Creo

As Chord

=== Albums ===
- Monochord (2001 – Background)

=== Singles, EPs and others ===
- Acid Drop-Doubting Thomas Remix - Hummingbird -2013
- Steps Ahead Edgar Jack Up Late In Kreuzber remix - Hummingbird Label-2012
- Stimulation Edgar Jack Remix - Hummingbird Label -2012
- Tickling Whispers Doubting Thomas Remix - Hummingbird-2012
- Floating -Various Focal Point Vol 4 Cynosure Records - 2012
- Soul Thing Alexi Delano Remix -Hummingbird Label - 2011
- Impar 10 Compilation (30xFile, MP3, 224), Bloom – Impar, 2009
- Analyze This 100% Vinyl (CDr, Mixed, Comp), In Berlin 1995 (U.Schmidt Edit) – Sony Norge, 2009
- Dinky Mixes Horizontal (CD, Comp, Mixes) – P Vine Records, Horizontal, 2008
- Micros Morning (CD, Album) – Kupei Musika - 2007
- Don Julio's converseria EP Cynosure Records - (2005)
- Condormusic Compilation - (2004)
- Re:Bird The Electronicat Remixes (CD) Electrico – Angelika Köhlermann, 2004
- Colores Volumen 1 (CD) Rare – Mil Records, 2004
- Moment (CD) Dude – WMF Records, 2004
- Bucci EP (2003)
- Canción electrónica - Indice Virgen Label (2003)
- Skip & Chord (12") Rek – WMF Records, 2003
- Antenna International (12") Rhodes Relejades – Antenna International, 2003
- Fueradeserie!_compilado 01 (CDr) Slom, Koe – Fueradeserie! 2002

As Detalles

=== Albums ===
- Shapes of summer (2003)
- Micros morning (CD, Album) – Kupei Musika, 2007

=== Singles, EPs and others ===
- Hello Donee EP (12", EP) – Kupei Musika, 2006
- Tour de Traum (CD, 12") -"Rhodes Relejadas" – Traum Schallplatten, 2004
- Hazardous materials (CD) Solm – The Consumers Research & Development Label, 2005
