= NS Plan U =

3-car Diesel multiple unit

Plan U / DE-3
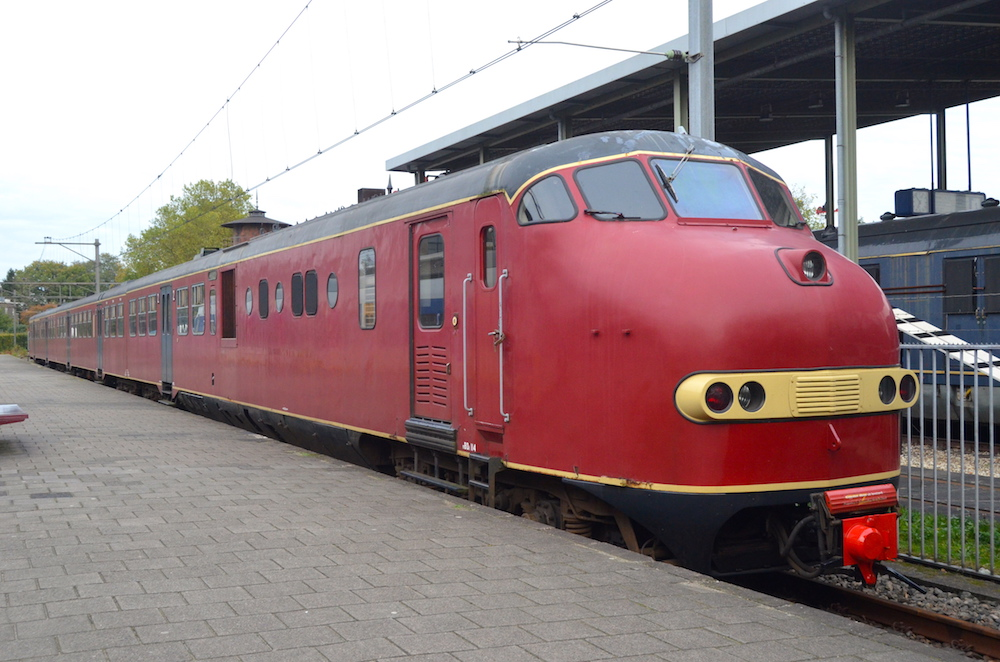
- NS Plan U 114 at Dutch Railway Museum in 2017
- Stock type: Diesel Multiple Unit
- In service: 1960-2003
- Manufacturer: Werkspoor NV
- Constructed: 1960-1963
- Entered service: 1960
- Retired: 2003
- Number built: 42
- Number in service: 1 set (unconfirmed)
- Number retired: 41 units (123 cars, unconfirmed)
- Number preserved: 12 cars (4 units)
- Number scrapped: 12 cars (4 units)
- Successor: Stadler GTW (Netherlands)
- Fleet numbers: 111-152 (191-195)

Specifications
- Train length: 74.43 meters (244.19 feet)
- Car length: 24.81 meters (81.39 feet)
- Doors: 2 (Motor), 4 (Trailer)
- Engine type: 2x Werkspoor diesel engine, type RUHB 1616
- Cylinder count: 16
- Wheels driven: 8 (motor car)
- Track gauge: 1,435 mm (4 ft 8 1/2 in)

The NS Plan U, officially the DE-3, was a 3-car Diesel multiple unit designed for service under the Nederlandse Spoorwegen.

The cab's nose was used as a basis for the Mat '64 EMU, which operated under the same company until 2016.

== History ==
=== Beginning ===
The trains were built between 1960 and 1963 by Werkspoor in Utrecht. They entered service under the 1xx classification, being numbered between 111 and 152. It had a more modern nose compared to the previously-built Mat '54. Originally, the plan was to give the sets the same nose as the RAm / DE-4, also built by Werkspoor. The problem was, due to the angular nose shape of said TEE sets, the rain kept hitting the windows during heavy rainfall, which caused a lot of inconvenience for the driver, which was why the DE-3s have their nose type, which was used on the Mat' 64. Other innovations compared to the older NS stock were the light construction, the central door locking by the conductor and a public address system. The trains were painted red, the new color for diesel trains introduced around 1960, which earned them the nickname "Red Devils". On trainsets 148-142, five blinds have been placed in the side wall of the engine room instead of three, and there's only 1 porthole.

=== Refurbishment ===
From 1968, they were painted in Nederlandse Spoorwegen's Yellow & Bluestripe colors. The engine compartment got 2 stripes instead of the normal 3. In 1972, the sliding doors were replaced by swinging doors that had been introduced and successfully tested on the Mat '64. Only the sliding door in the luggage compartment was retained.

In June 2000, it was decided to give 19 trains a lifespan extension. The trains would be equipped with air conditioning in the cabin, new upholstery for the seats and even a new diesel engine. The trains would be used on electrified track sections and could thus compensate for the resulting shortage of rolling stock. Five trains were also fitted with ATB New Generation. This allowed the NS to also use the trains on diesel track sections where this protection was applicable. The numbers of the new trains were 191 to 195 (ex 137, 135, 122, 130 and 141 respectively).

In total, 15 trains were overhauled. The trains can be recognized by a large black box on the cabin of the engine compartment. This box contains the cooling of a new generator for energy supply. The latter is placed in the luggage compartment, which is no longer accessible to passengers.

=== Retirement ===
In 2001, almost all diesel lines had been taken over by other carriers or the new DM'90 was deployed by NS. In addition, almost all diesel lines were now equipped with ATB-NG. The last service for unconverted trains was therefore the local train service between Hengelo and Oldenzaal. In July of that year, that route was also equipped with ATB-NG and the service was taken over by DM'90 and the last unconverted trains were taken out of service.

The first overhauled trainsets were deployed in April 2002, on the 9100 series train numbers (local train Zwolle – Groningen). In December of that year, the 6400 series trains (local train Weert – Eindhoven) followed. The trainsets also appeared occasionally between Zwolle and Kampen when the DM'90 was defective. More than a year and a half later, in December 2003, the last sets were retired.

== Consist information ==
Plan U trainsets consisted of a motor and 2 trailer cars, as shown below.

Classification	Mc / mBDk	T / B	Tc / ABk
Capacity	24	168	168
Notes	Equipped with first class seating.		

The first half of the mBDk car was equipped with the 2 engines.

== Preservation ==
Four Plan U trainsets have been preserved as museum material, which were 114, 115, 121 and 151. 114 is included in the collection of the Dutch Railroad Museum in Utrecht. 113 & 115 were donated to the Haarlem IJmuidense Spoorweg Maatschappij (which is going to be referred to as the HIJSM from now on) in Haarlem. Both were restored to operating condition and are now in the "Red Devil" scheme. In 2007, 121 joined them. The black box on the cabin of the motor car was still clearly recognizable. Unfortunately, all 3 were broken into and had their insides partially destroyed on the night of February 21-22, 2009. But since the damage, despite costing several hundred-thousand euros, was small, they were partially restored to operating conditions.

114 was restored in 2009 and returned to the Dutch Railroad Museum in 2010. It's now used for excursion trips.

The total preservation list going up in numbers are 113, 114, 115, 121, and 151.
