= International Society for Chilean Music =

Non-profit organization

International Society for Chilean Music (SIMUC)
- Abbreviation: SIMUC
- Formation: 2015
- Headquarters: Vienna
- Location: Austria
- Website: www.simuc.org

The International Society for Chilean Music (SIMUC) is a non-profit organization that promotes Chilean art, music, musicians, and musicologists internationally.

== History ==
The SIMUC was founded by composer Javier Party, cellist Daygoro Serón and philologist Andrea Golsong in December 2015 in Vienna, Austria, from where it operates internationally. It has around 150 members from different countries, most of them are Chilean musicians.

== Concerts ==
The first concert organized by the SIMUC took place on June 29 of 2016 in Vienna, Austria. It was a Liederabend with 12 pieces from 10 Chilean composers of the last 100 years, born between 1884 and 1983. An unprecedented sample of Chilean music in the international capital of classical music.

The SIMUC organizes around eight concerts per year in different countries exclusively with Chilean repertoire.

== Podcasts ==
The SIMUC produces MEC, a Podcast dedicated exclusively to Chilean Electronic Music. The first episode of the first season (MEC0101) was published on September 30 of 2016. The seasons have 10 episodes. Each episode is presented and programmed by a different expert from the Chilean electroacoustic music community.

== Publications ==
The International Society for Chilean Music publishes the Reporte Elgueta monthly, a selection of international news of Chilean classical musicians, as well as two bimonthly columns: Enfoque, dedicated to articles on the Chilean classical music scene written by musicologists, composers, journalists and researchers, and a more personal column where Chilean performers abroad write about their own experience. In 2019 the SIMUC published the album Chilean Art Song: The Last 100 Years, a representative compilation the genre in Chile with 12 pieces by 10 Chilean composers of the last 100 years.

== Database ==
SIMUC's database includes quite detailed lists of Chilean musicians abroad, Chilean composers, works by Chilean composers and data on SIMUC's activities. In 2022, the organization presented a comprehensive report with the data contained in its extensive database, a repository full of information on musicians, composers, institutions and the vocations of Chileans in the field of classical music worldwide. This report was visualized and translated into English in the year 2023. The organization also details other projects related to the non-profit such as Reporte Elgueta, concerned with "news about Chilean musicians around the world."

== External links, ==
- www.simuc.org
