= NS Mat '64 =

Dutch train type

Mat '64 / Plan V / Plan T
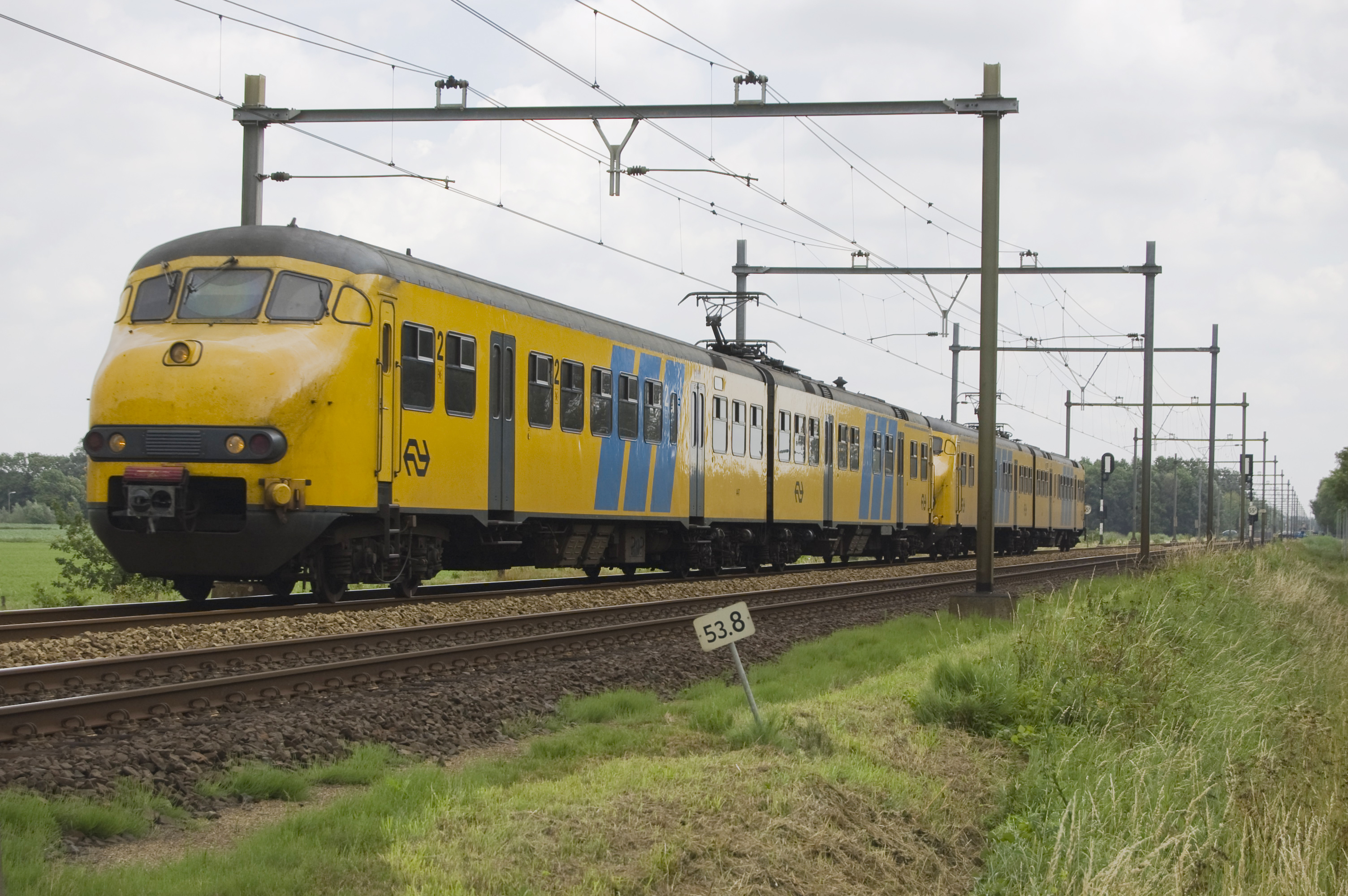
- Two 2-car Mat '64 Plan V trains in 2011

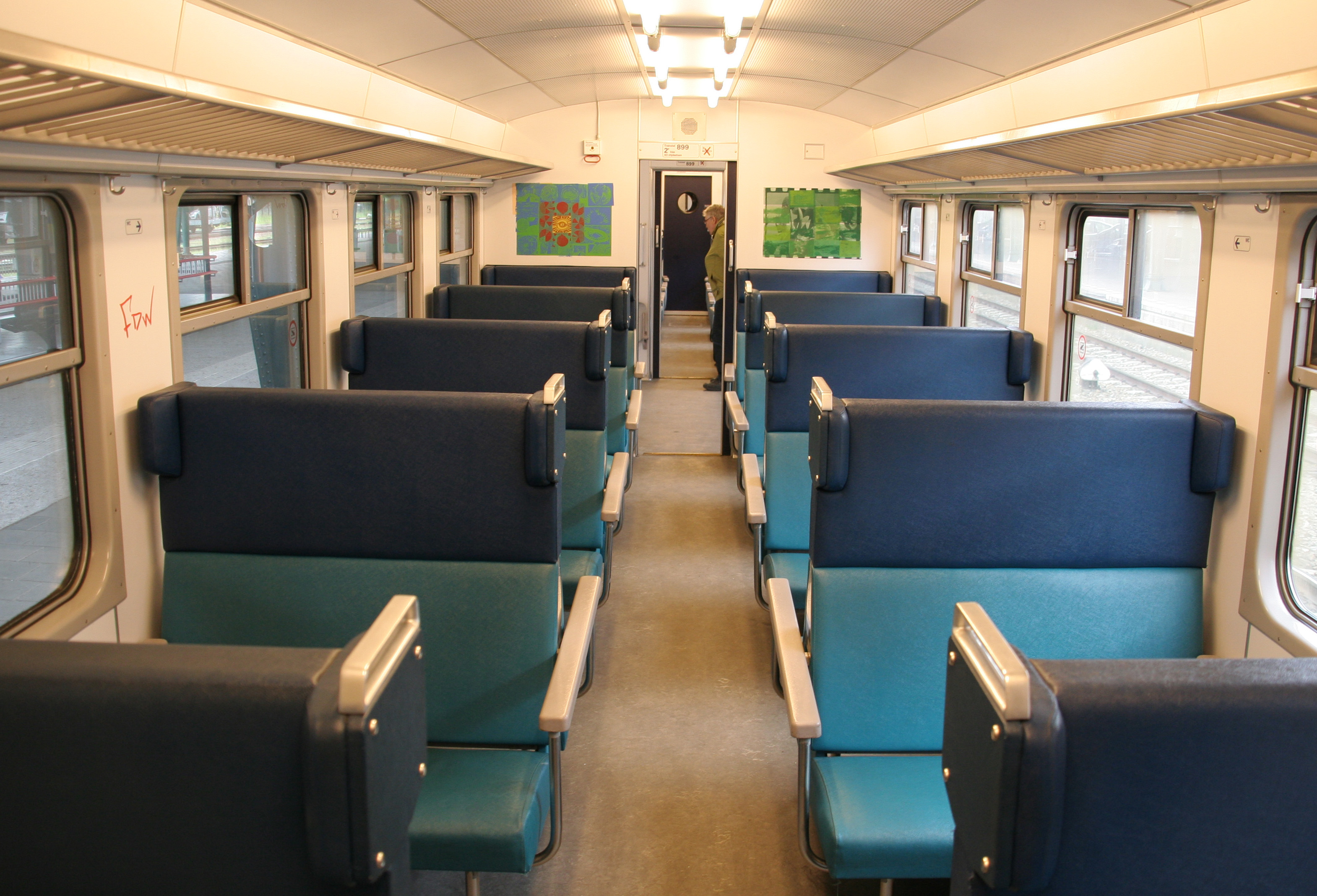
- 2nd Class interior
- In service: Nederlandse Spoorwegen 1962–2016; Keolis Nederland 2025-2026
- Manufacturers: Werkspoor, Waggonfabrik Talbot, Duewag
- Replaced: NS Mat '35, NS Mat '36, NS Mat '40
- Constructed: Plan T: 1961–1965; Plan V: 1966–1976
- Entered service: Plan T: 1962; Plan V: 1967
- Refurbished: Plan T: 1999–2002
- Scrapped: Plan T: 2008–2011; Plan V: 2014–Present
- Number built: Plan T: 31; Plan V: 246
- Number in service: Plan T: 0 Plan V: 0
- Number preserved: Plan T: 1 Plan V: 2
- Number scrapped: Plan T: 30
- Formation: Plan T: Bk + mBDK + mAB + Bk; Plan V: ABk + Bk
- Fleet numbers: Plan T: 501–531; Plan V: 401–438, 441–483, 801–965
- Capacity: Plan T: 1st Class: 41; 2nd Class: 230; Plan V: 1st Class: 24; 2nd Class: 104 / 118 / 120
- Operators: Nederlandse Spoorwegen, Arriva, Connexxion, Veolia Transport, Keolis Nederland

Specifications
- Train length: Plan T: 101.9 m (334 ft 4 in); Plan V: 52.1 m (170 ft 11 in)
- Doors: Plan T: 16; Plan V: 8/10
- Articulated sections: Plan T: 4 Plan V: 2
- Maximum speed: 140 km/h (87 mph)
- Weight: Plan T: 163 t Plan V: 86 t
- Traction motors: Smit-N.V. Heemaf
- Power output: Plan T: 1,400 kilowatts (1,900 hp); Plan V: 508 1,220 kilowatts (1,640 hp)
- Electric system: 1.5 kV DC Catenary
- Current collection: Pantograph
- UIC classification: Plan T: 2'2'+Bo'Bo'+Bo'Bo'+2'2'; Plan V: 2'Bo'+Bo'2'
- Coupling system: Scharfenberg
- Track gauge: 1,435 mm (4 ft 8 1/2 in) standard gauge

The NS Mat '64 or Materieel '64 are electric multiple units (EMU) built by Werkspoor and later by Duewag and Waggonfabrik Talbot between 1961 and 1976. They were operated in the Netherlands by the Nederlandse Spoorwegen (NS) until 2016, and temporarily returned to service in 2025. The equipment consists of independent four and two-car train sets called Plan T and Plan V: the Plan T is a 4-car EMU, and the Plan V is a 2-car EMU. Materieel '64 is sometimes nicknamed 'Apekoppen' (literal translation: 'monkey heads') and 'Standaard Stoptrein' ('Standard stopping train') due to their distinct shape.

Plan V was the largest series of Nederlandse Spoorwegen rolling stock for many years, with 246 units (although only 245 were present at the same time) already built until it was supplanted by NS VIRM. A number of train sets were also leased to and used by various regional carriers. Materieel '64 served for 55 years, from 1961 to 2016, on the Dutch railway network.

A solitary Mat '64 was brought out of retirement in 2025 and used for a route between Amersfoort and Barneveld Zuid due to refurbishment work being done on newer models. It ran its last journey of the Amersfoort-Barneveld Zuid route on 22 October 2026 officially being the last Mat '64 to see official usage.

== Appearance ==
The Materieel '64 rolling stock has a convex nose, like the Materieel '54 rolling stock, to protect the train operator in case of an accident. It, however, sticks out less far than the Materieel '54 rolling stock and looks more like the Plan U rolling stock nose.

Originally, Plan T and the 30 oldest Plan V train sets were green with a light yellow band. From the in 1968 delivered 431 train set onwards, they were delivered in the new NS color scheme, which consisted of a yellow with gray and slanted blue advertising tracks. The reason for this, was to give the railways a new impetus in the context of Spoorslag '70. The older green train sets also received the new color scheme in the following years.

== Manufacturing ==
The Materieel '64 prototype, Plan TT (Treinstel Toekomst, translation: 'Trainset Future') 501, was built by Werkspoor in 1961. In the years 1964-1965 the follow-up series Plan T was built and delivered in three partial series. Most trains where scrapped.

Plan V was delivered in 13 partial series in ten years (from 1966 to 1976). The first train set was already scrapped before the last train sets were delivered. The last two series (V12 and V13) are as old or even newer than the oldest SGM train sets. As of 2016, all of the train sets have been put out of service.

== Design ==
The Materieel '64 design is derived from the DMU Plan U, which had been built a few years prior. It was the first rolling stock with the later frequently used swivel doors. The Scharfenberg coupler allows the train to travel as a consist, but not with other rolling stock. A notable difference between Plan T and Plan V is the number of train carriages: four (Plan T) and two (Plan V) respectively - the letter is therefore not the initial letter of the number of train carriages. Furthermore, the corner windows on the cabin at the head of the train were painted gray on Plan T and yellow on Plan V.

Notable Materieel '64 innovations compared to older rolling stock included:

- double one-legged pantograph in the middle
- buttons on the inside and outside of the train for opening and closing the doors with central door lock (the conductor no longer has to walk along the train to close the doors)
- locked doors (passengers are no longer able to open the doors during the journey)
- electronic departure signal (the operator sees a light on his instrument panel and no longer has to wait until the conductor gives the departure signal)
- destination sign

Older train sets and carriages were later provided with central door lock and broadcasting system.

Not everything was renewed, for example, the characteristic heavy engine noise was maintained and the train sets all had a brake pad, a braking system in which a cast iron block is pushed onto the wheel tire when the train set starts to brake. This brake system leads to a roughening of the running surface, making the tire rolling noise high. More modern trains have a disc brake, which makes these trains quieter. The brake pad also causes a loud screeching sound at the end of the braking distance.

== Withdrawal ==
In July 2010 the last Plan T EMUs were taken out of service. As of December 2012, only a small amount of routes were being served by Materieel '64 normally. They also had been used widely in 2010 and 2012 winters when many newer SLT's were out of service, due to winter problems.

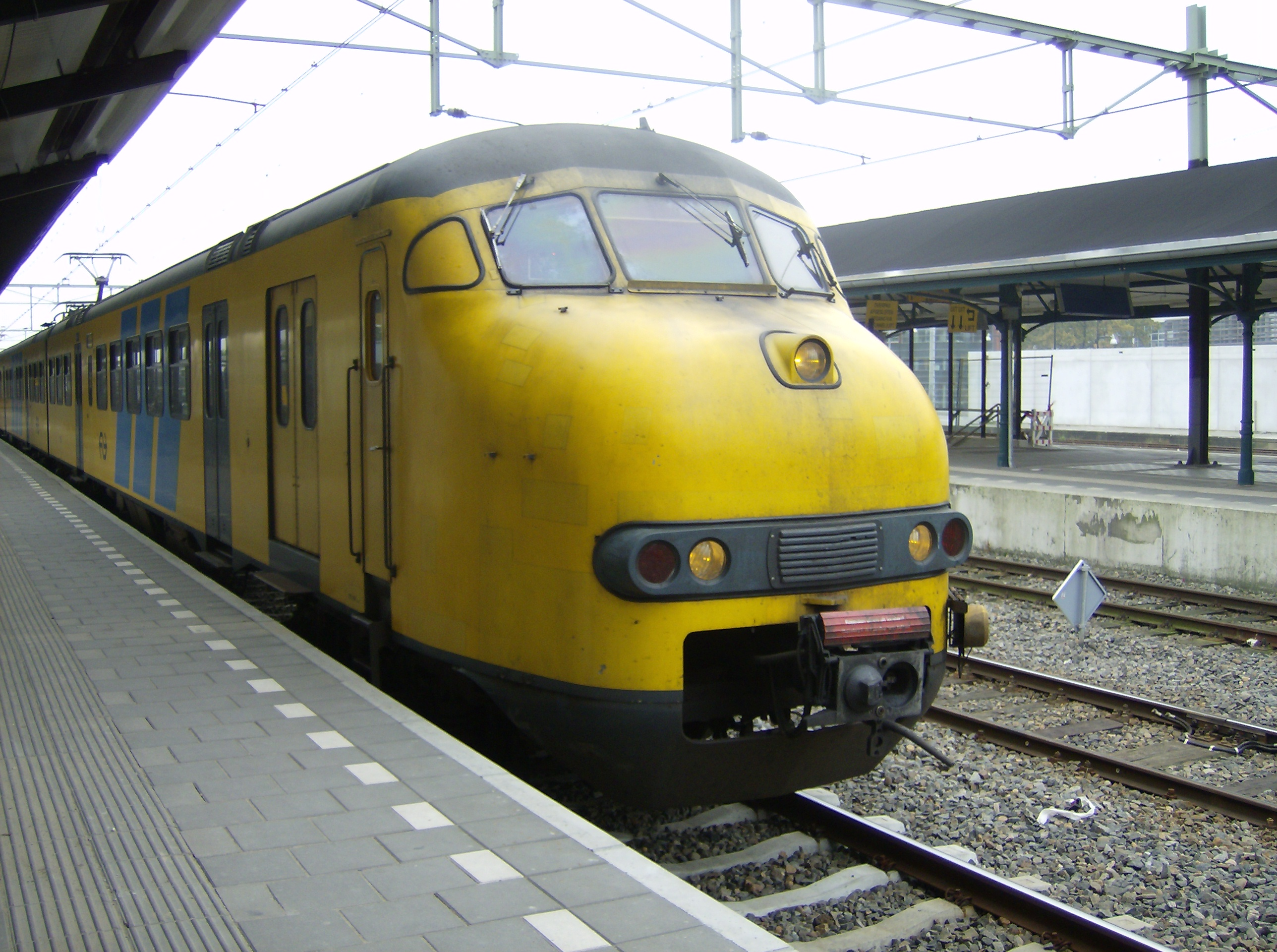
A Plan V at Apeldoorn

In 2015 there were still 40 Plan V sets in service, used on stopping services outside the Randstad.

In late 2015, Nederlandse Spoorwegen announced the withdrawal of the remaining Plan V sets in the 2016 timetable, starting in December 2015. However, due to a shortage of rolling stock, several sets were kept in service until the 4th of April 2016, when the last sets were finally taken out of service. Many sets have been scrapped.

In 2025, one Plan V unit #904 was brought back into service for Keolis Nederland operating for RRReis brand due to a temporary rolling stock shortage because of modernization of its Protos and FLIRT fleet. Running on the Valleilijn from Amersfoort operating the 6:55am and 7:55am round trips to Barneveld Zuid in addition to sporadic deployments depending on the day.

== Details ==
In total there were 246 Plan V sets and 31 Plan T sets built, the table shows details of these sets.

Series:	Built:	Quantity when new:	Set numbers:
Plan TT	1961	1 (Prototype)	501
Plan T	1964–1965	30	502–531
Plan V1, V2, V3	1966–1970	38	401–438
Plan V4	1969–1970	18	441–458
Plan V5	1969–1970	13	459–471
Plan V6	1969–1970	12	472–483
Plan V7	1970–1972	40	801–840
Plan V8	1972–1976	30	841–870
Plan V9	1972–1976	18	871–888
Plan V10	1972–1976	32	889–920
Plan V11	1972–1976	15	921–935
Plan V12	1972–1976	15	936–950
Plan V13	1972–1976	15	951–965

== Services operated ==
The services that remained for Mat '64 in 2015 are listed below. These were all taken over by other rolling stock from April 2016 onwards.

Series	Train Type	Route	Stock	Notes
4400	Sprinter	's-Hertogenbosch – Oss – Nijmegen	Mat '64	Connected with series 9600
6800	Sprinter	Maastricht Randwyck – Maastricht – Sittard – Roermond	Mat '64	
6900	Sprinter	Heerlen – Sittard	Mat '64	
7000	Sprinter	Apeldoorn – Deventer – Almelo – Hengelo – Enschede	Mat '64	No evening and weekend service between Almelo and Enschede
7500	Sprinter	Ede-Wageningen – Arnhem	Mat '64	
9600	Sprinter	's-Hertogenbosch – Eindhoven – Helmond – Deurne	Mat'64	Connected with series 4400
23500	Intercity	Heerlen – Sittard	Mat '64	Only evening service

== Timetable 2016 ==
Since the beginning of timetable 2016, which started on December 13, 2015, the Nederlandse Spoorwegen planned to take all Materieel '64 trains out of service. However, that was not possible because there was a lack of deployable trains. That is also the reason why the Materieel ’64 trains could still be seen on some routes in early 2016. However, the trains were not scheduled to drive following a schedule; they will be operating on routes where they’re needed instead. In many cases, they will be seen on the same routes as they were driving on in 2015.

From the original 246 Materieel ’64 Plan V trains, the following 28 trains remain available for service; nrs. 441, 443, 444, 446, 447, 449–458, 463–466, 469, 471, 474, 475, 478–480, 482 and 965. These were all taken out of service on the 4th of April 2016.

== Gallery ==
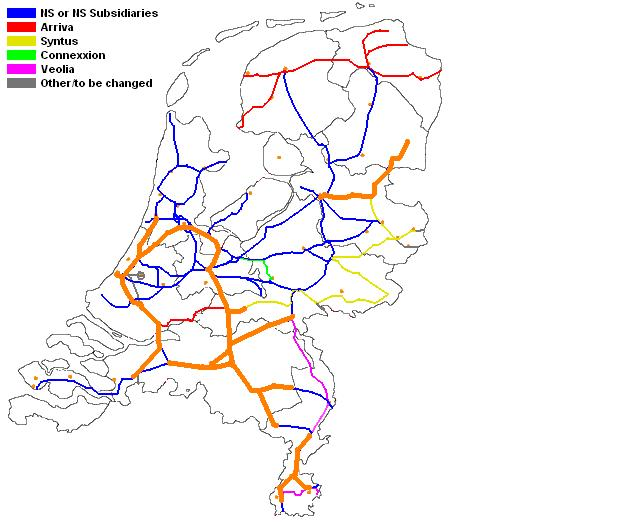
2010 operating area of Mat '64

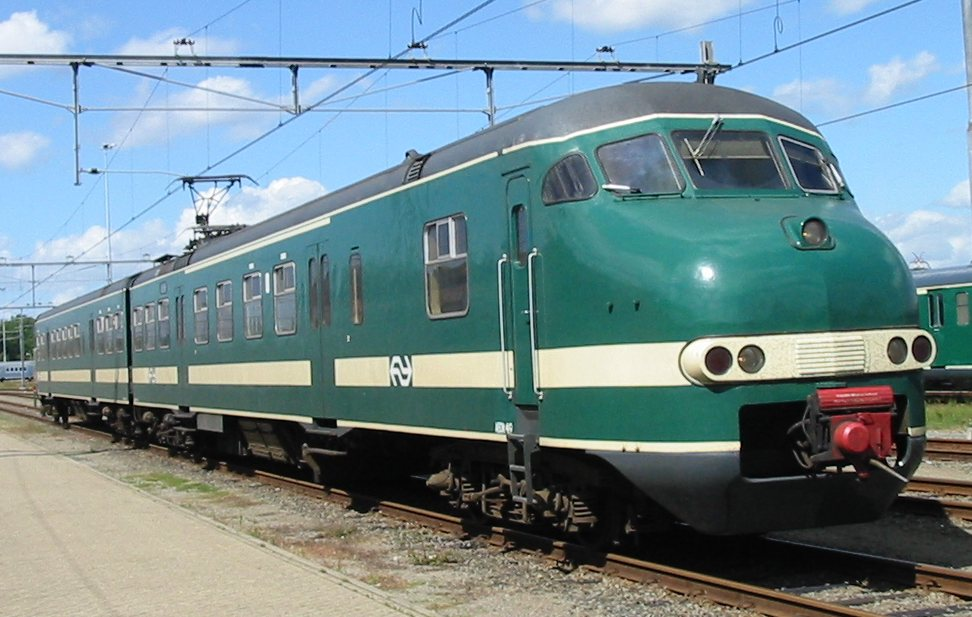
419 was repainted in 2004 into a green livery, which it wore when new

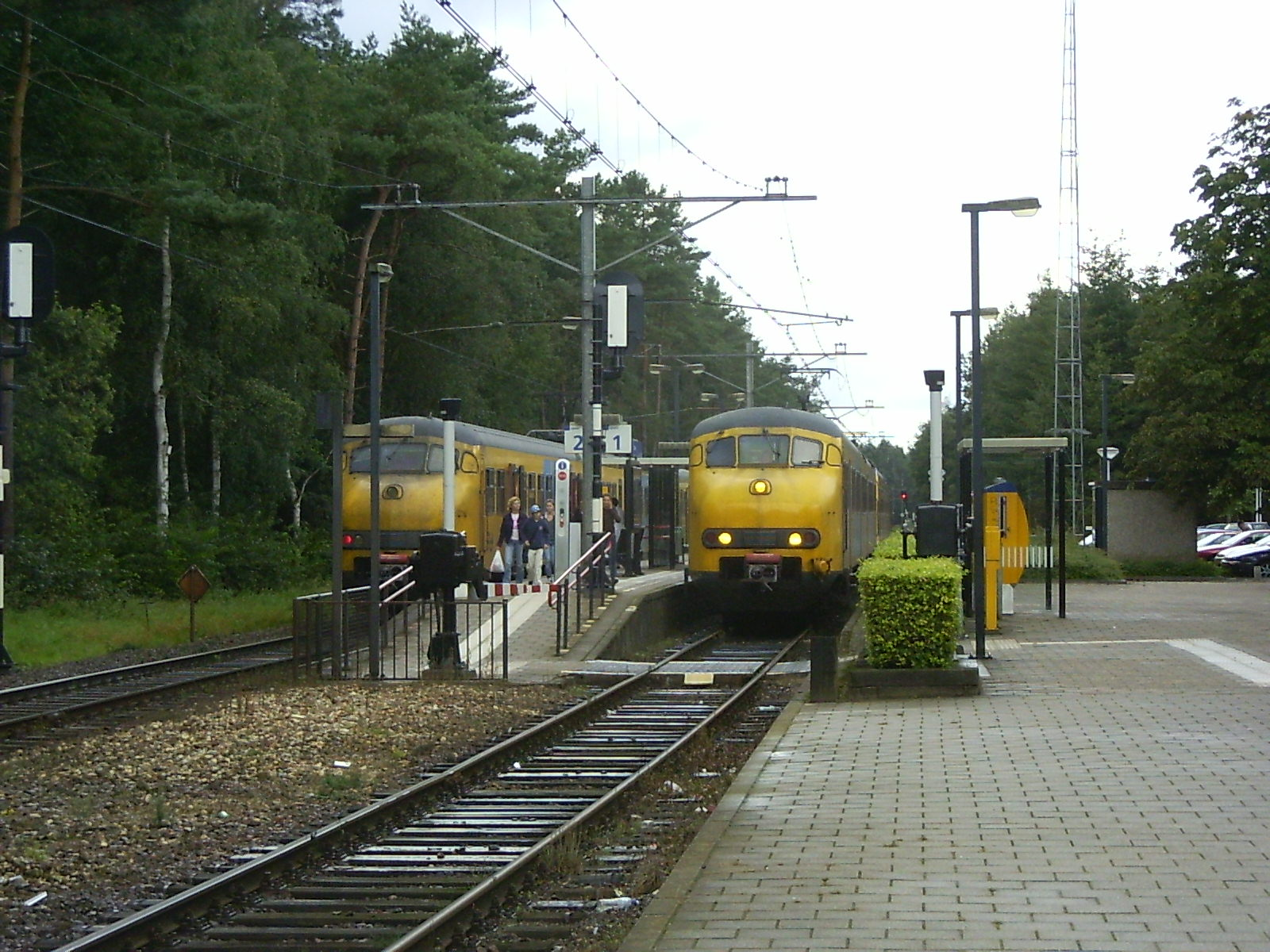
Two Mat '64's passing at Ommen railway station on the Emmerlijn

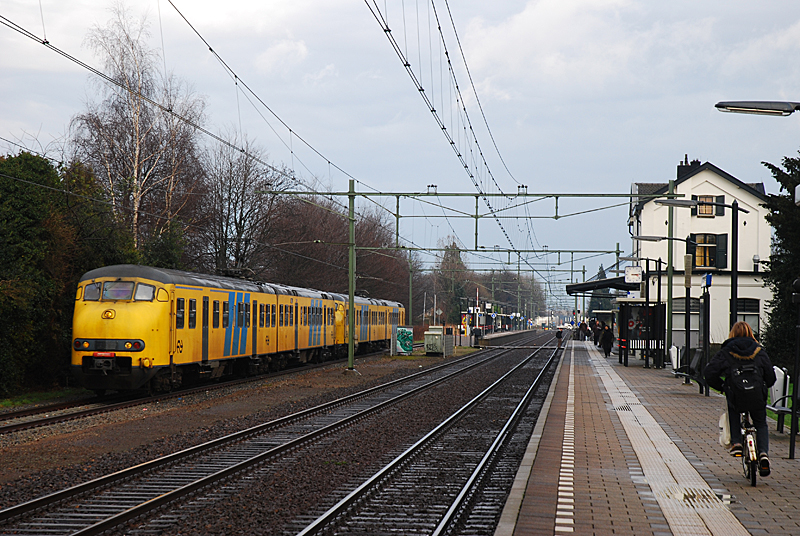
Two Plan Vs at Oisterwijk railway station

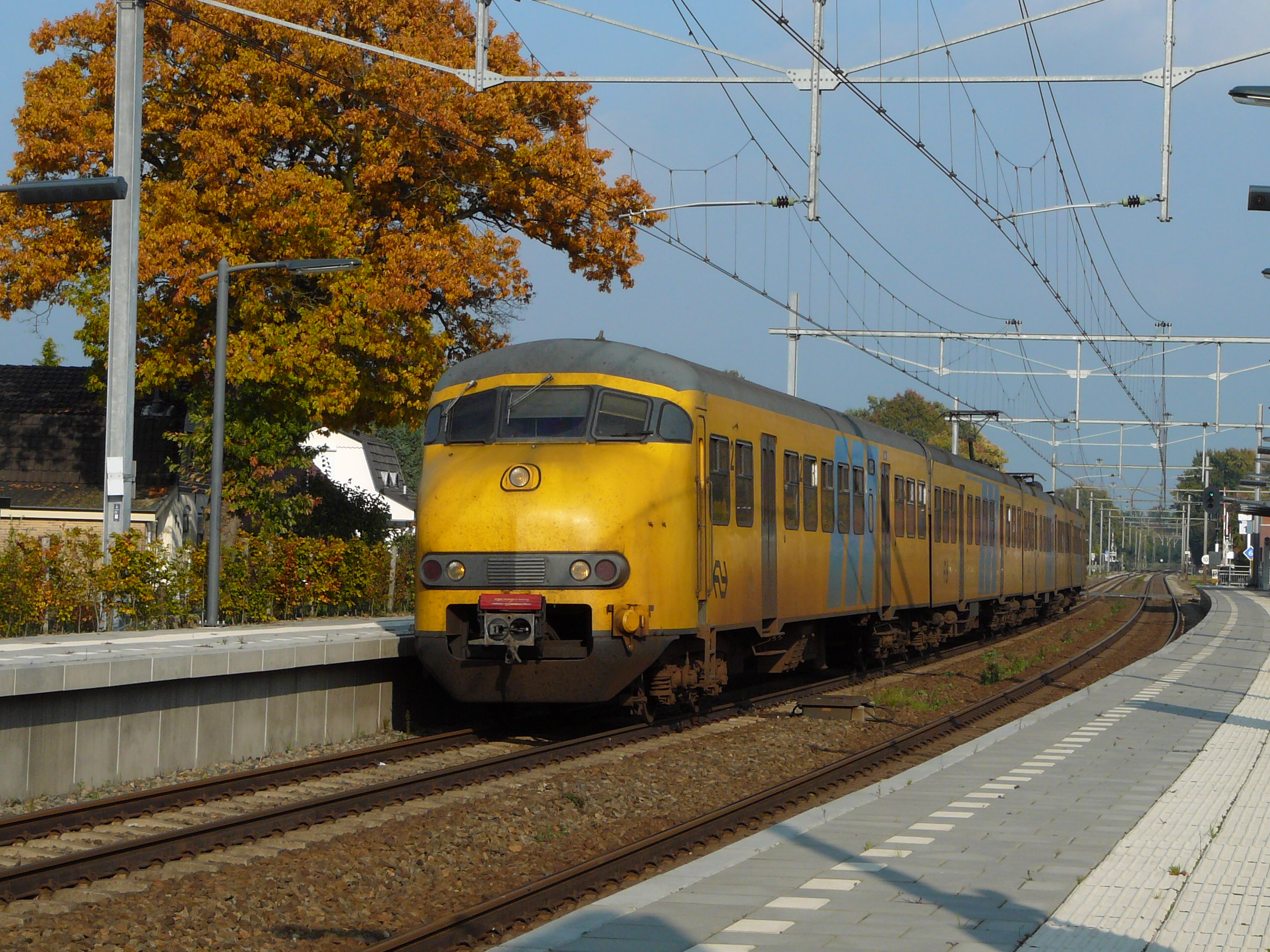
522 at Twello railway station on an Apeldoorn - Almelo service

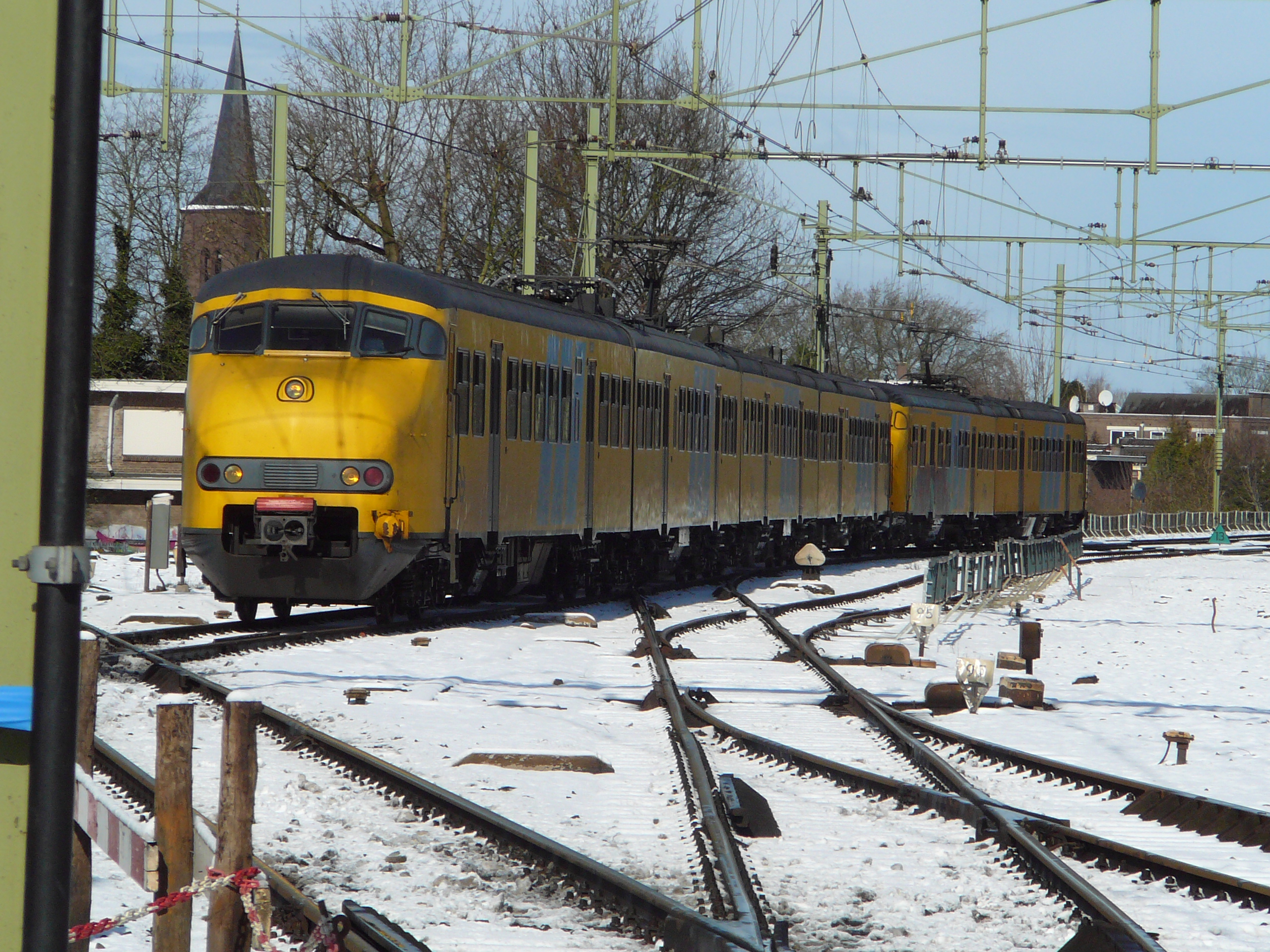
503 and 829 arriving at Deventer railway station from Zwolle to Nijmegen.

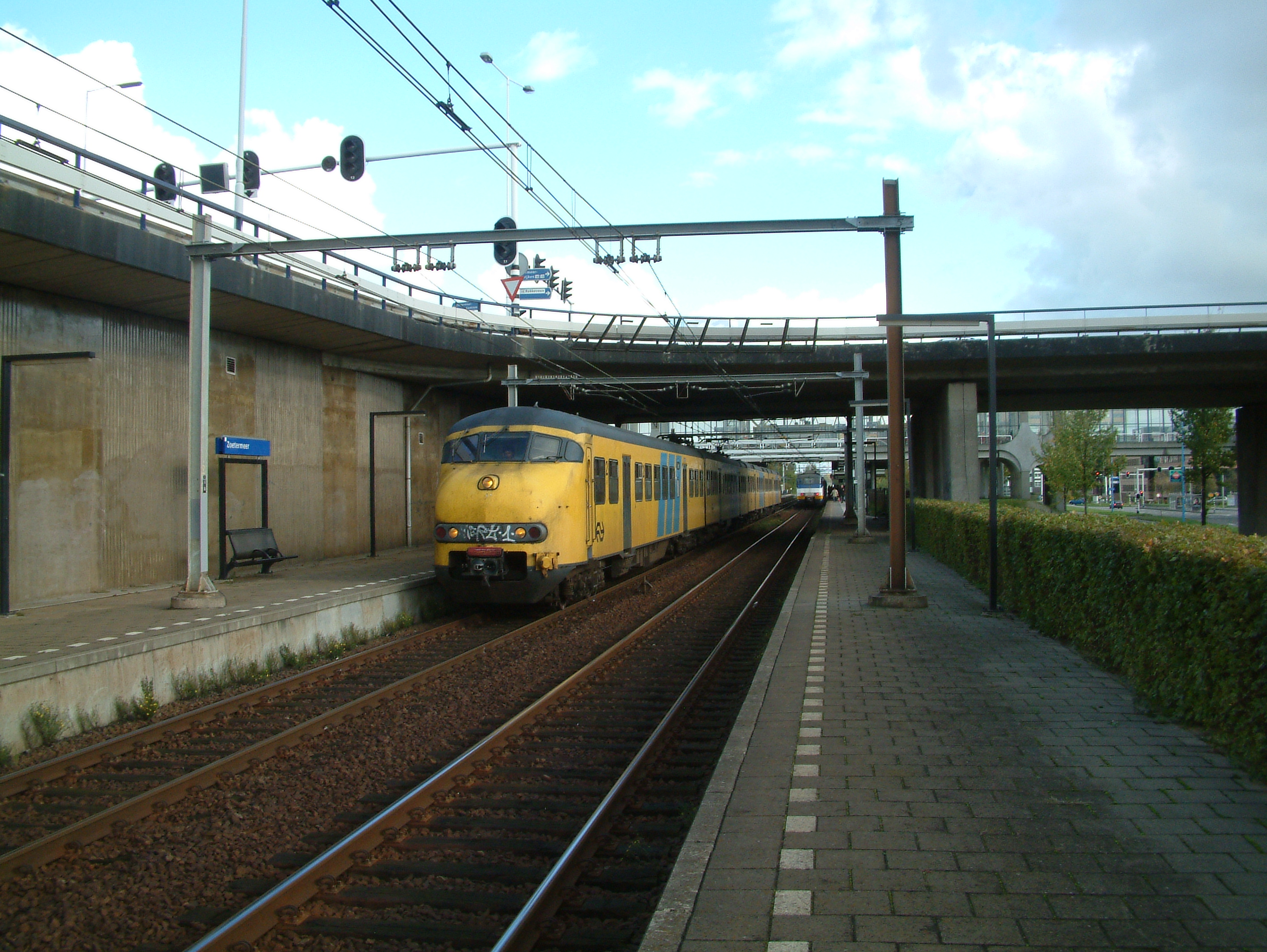
A Mat '64 seen at Zoetermeer railway station

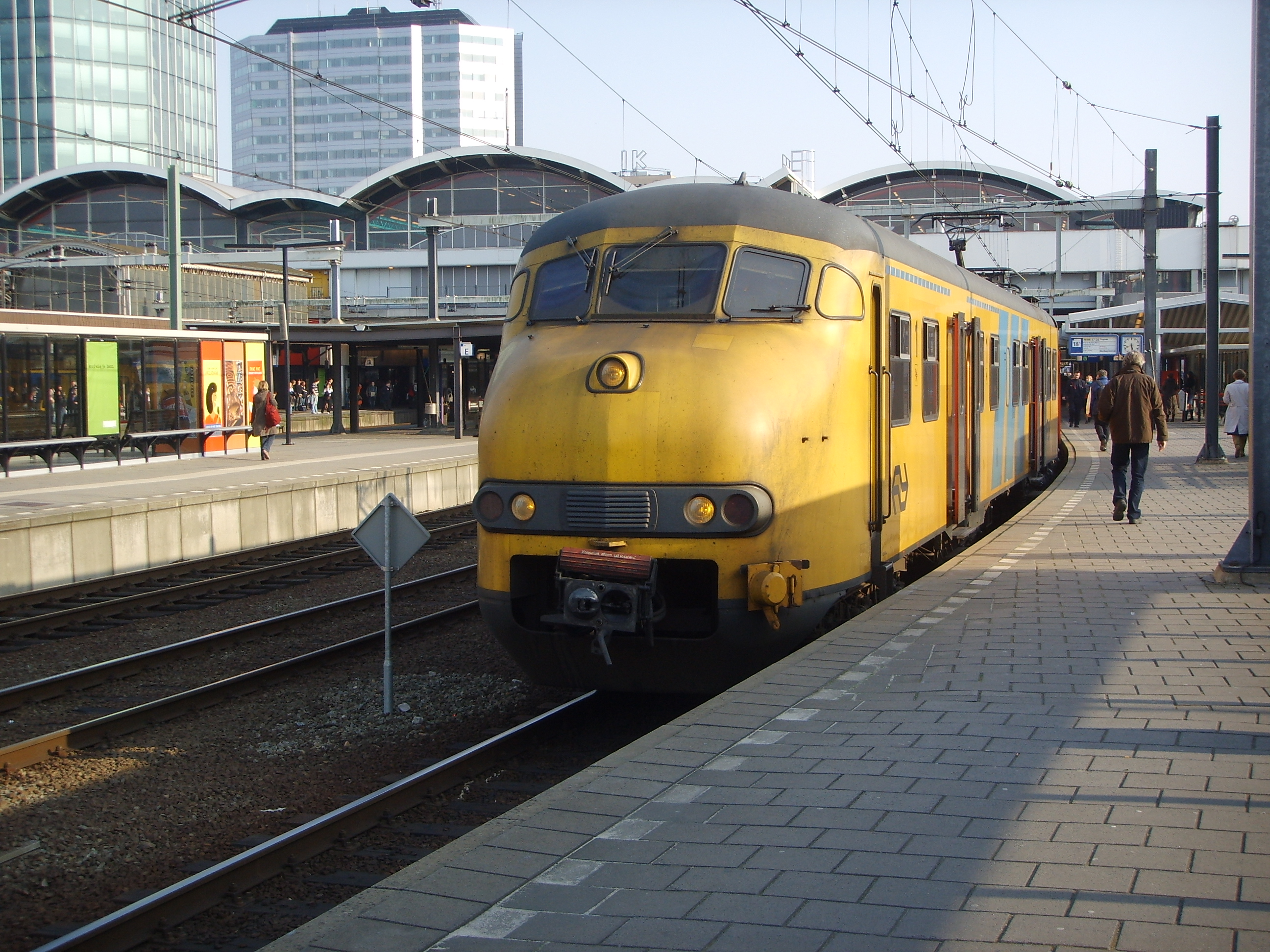
Plan V at Utrecht Centraal railway station on a Stoptrein to Den Haag Centraal

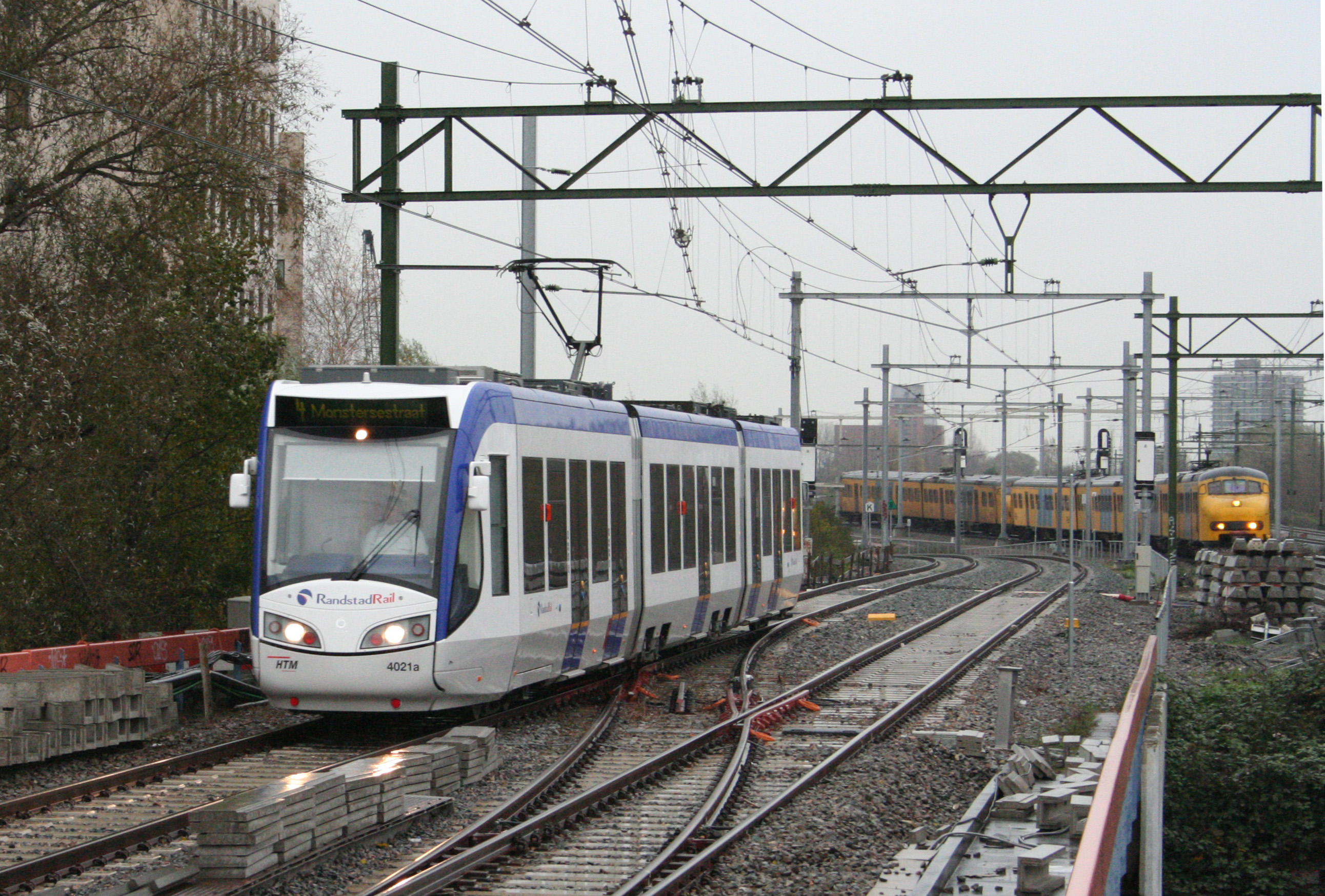
A Plan T and Plan V (right) approach Den Haag Laan van NOI railway station

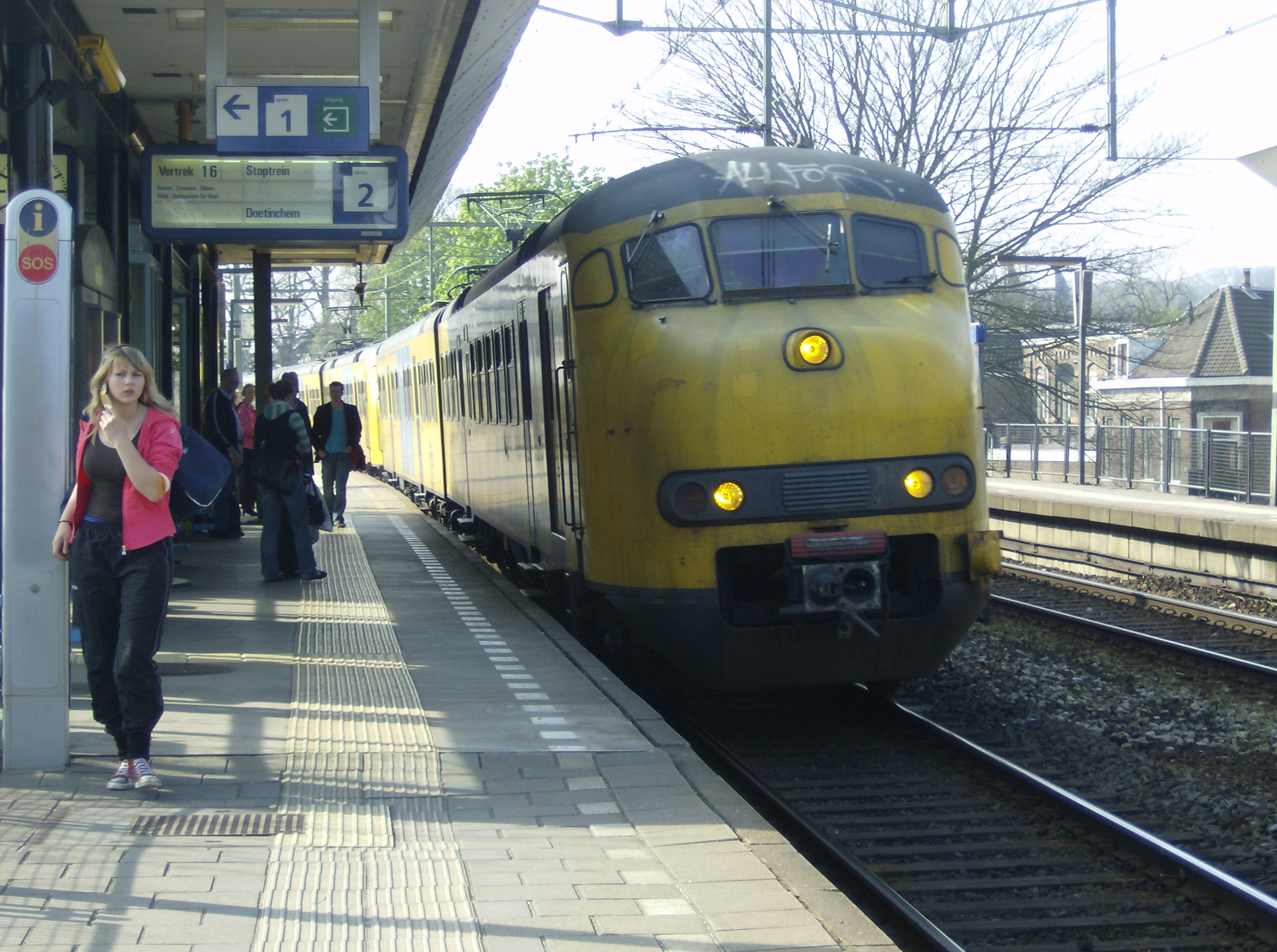
2 Plan Vs pass Arnhem Velperpoort railway station on a service towards Zutphen

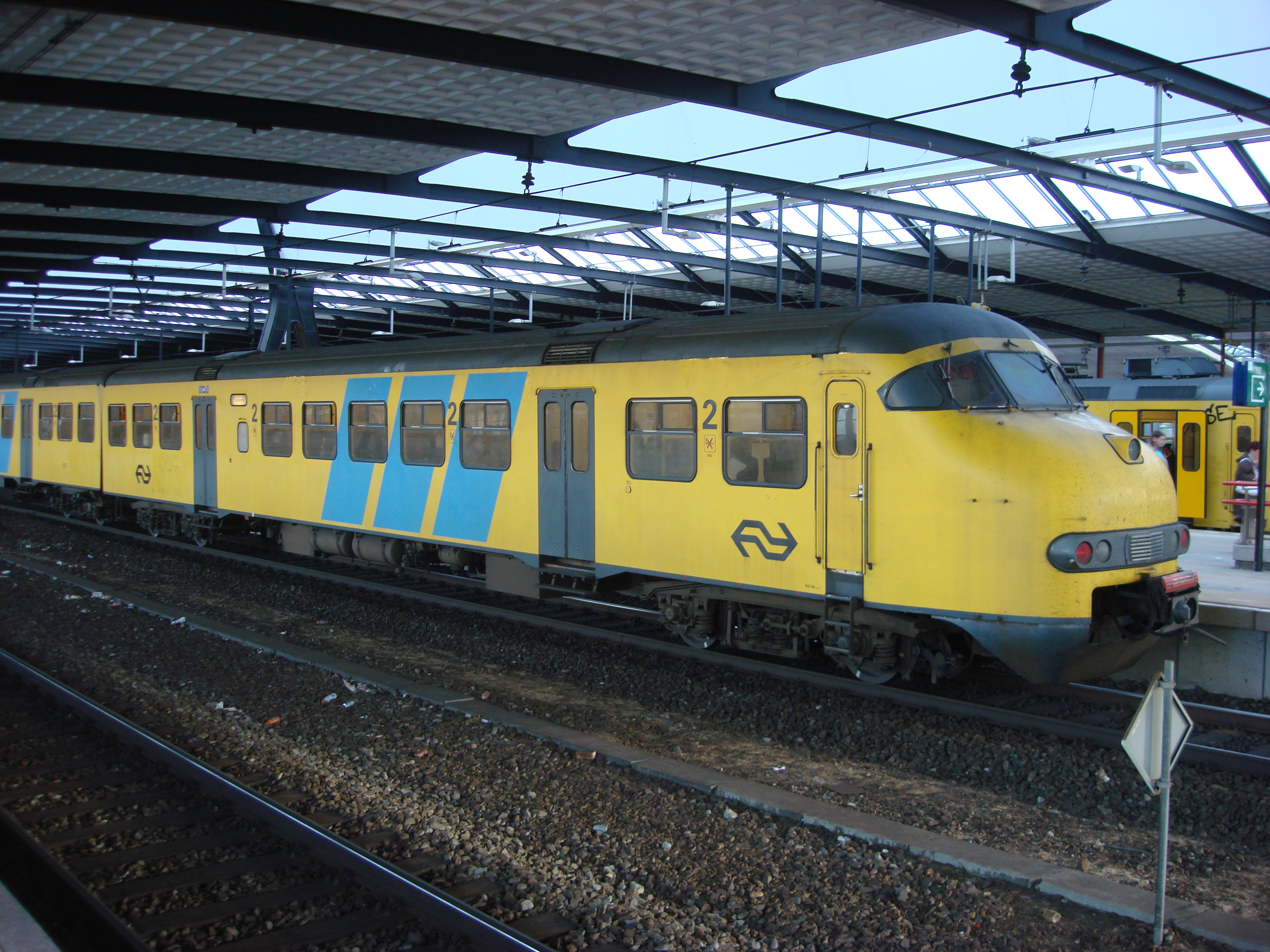
A Mat '64 at Schiedam Centrum railway station

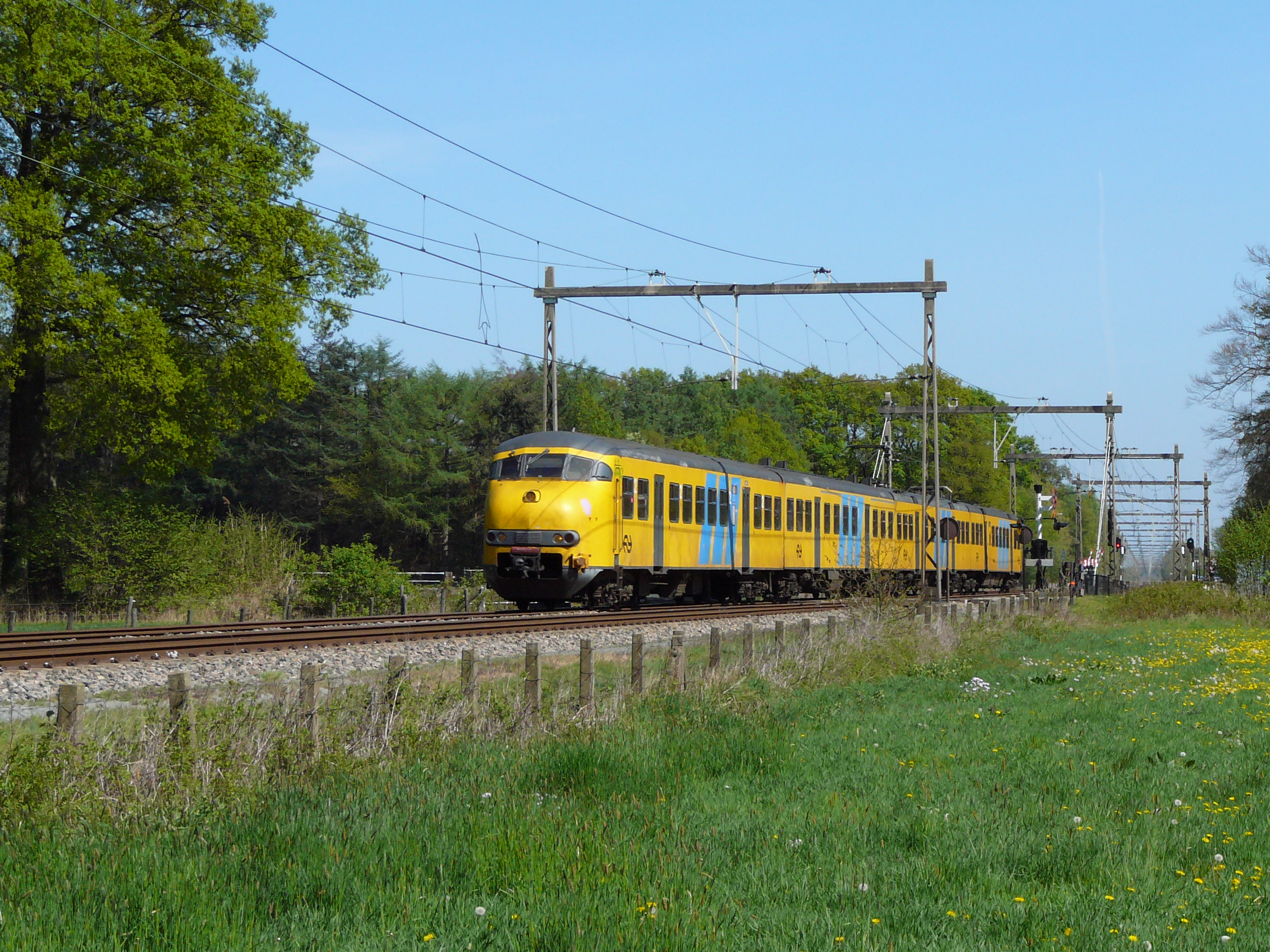
506 nearing Deventer Colmschate railway station on an Almelo - Apeldoorn Stoptrein

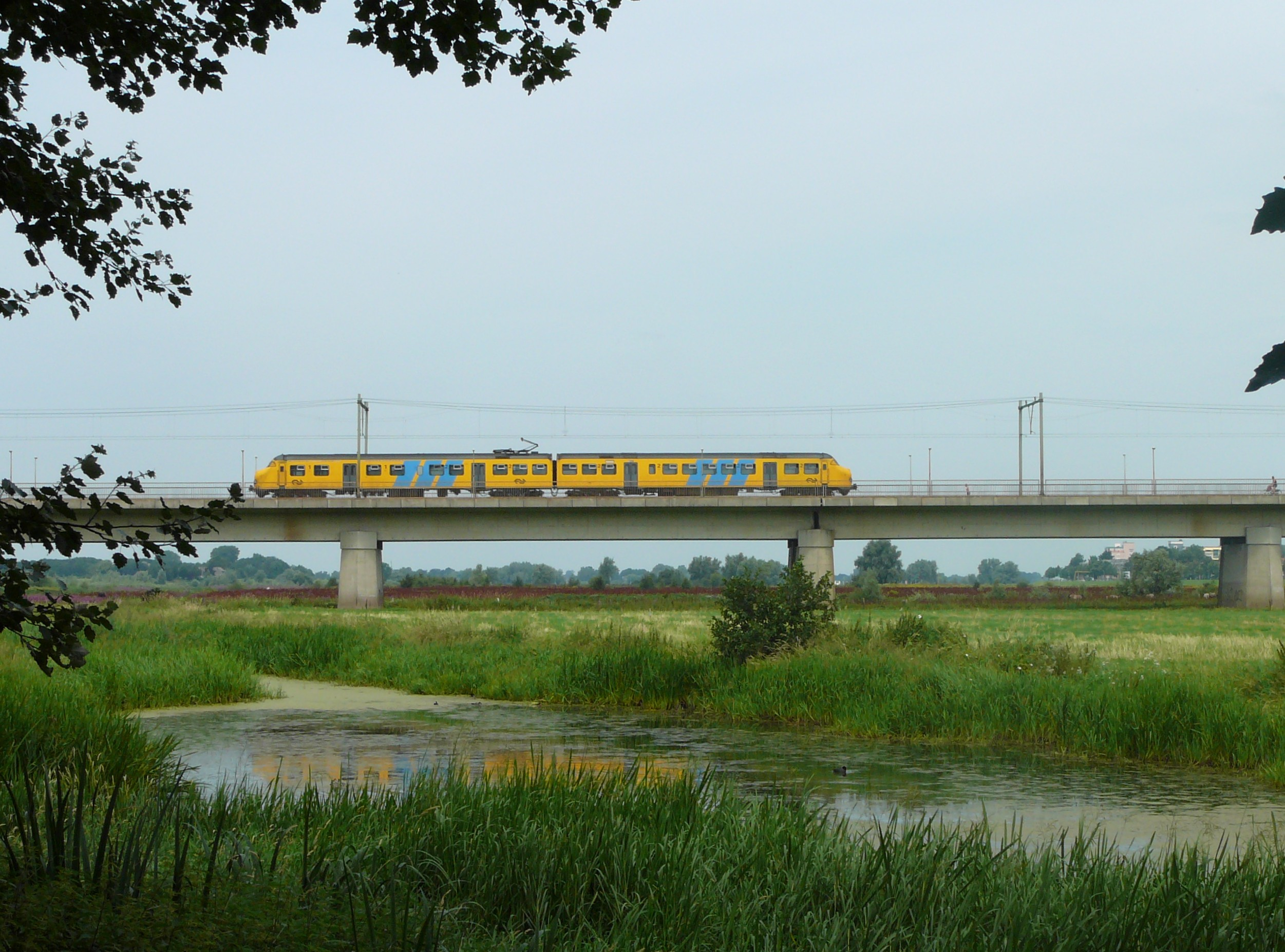
Plan V near Deventer on the IJsselbrug on an Almelo - Apeldoorn Stoptrein

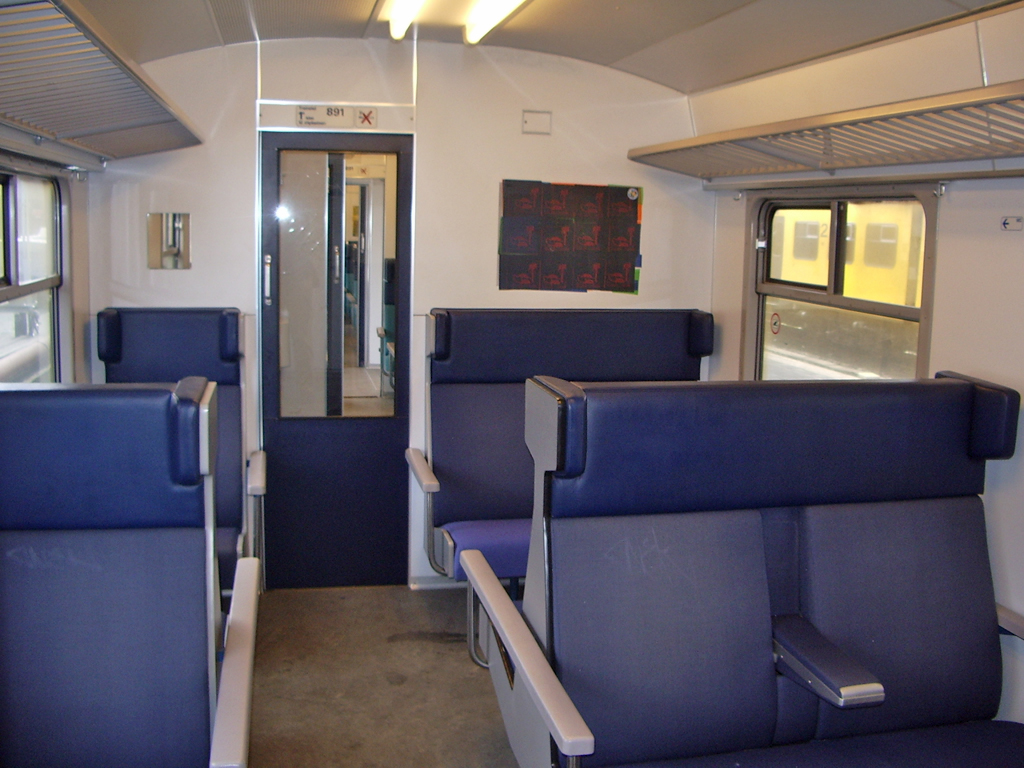
First Class Seating in Plan V

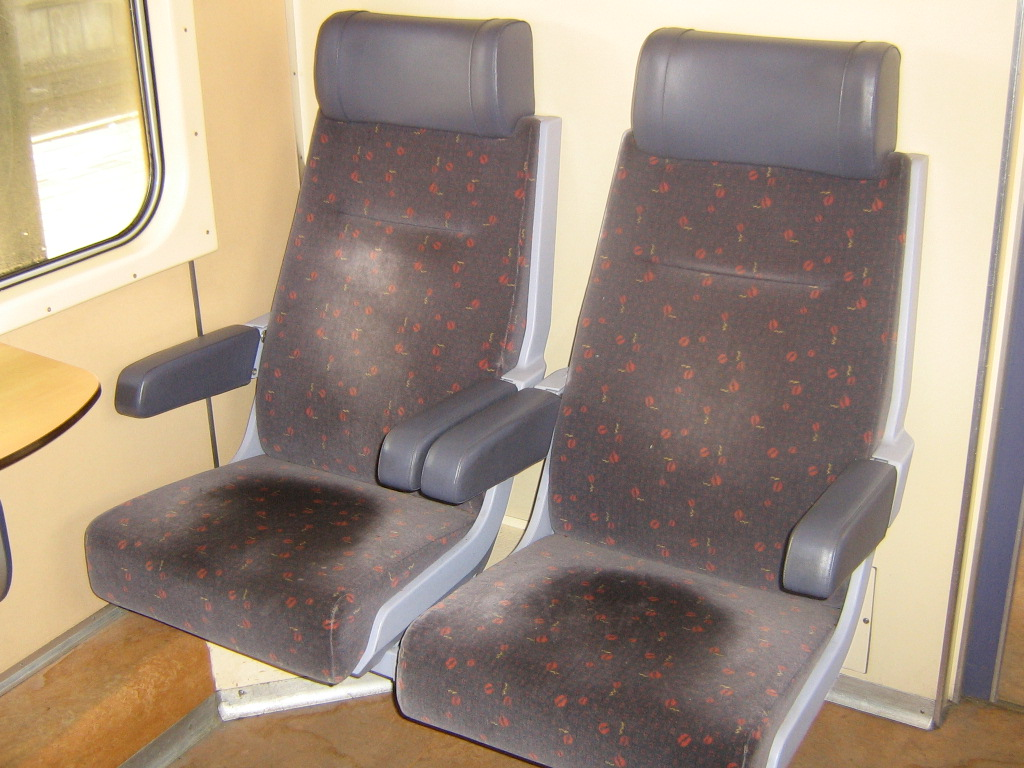
First Class Seating in Plan T

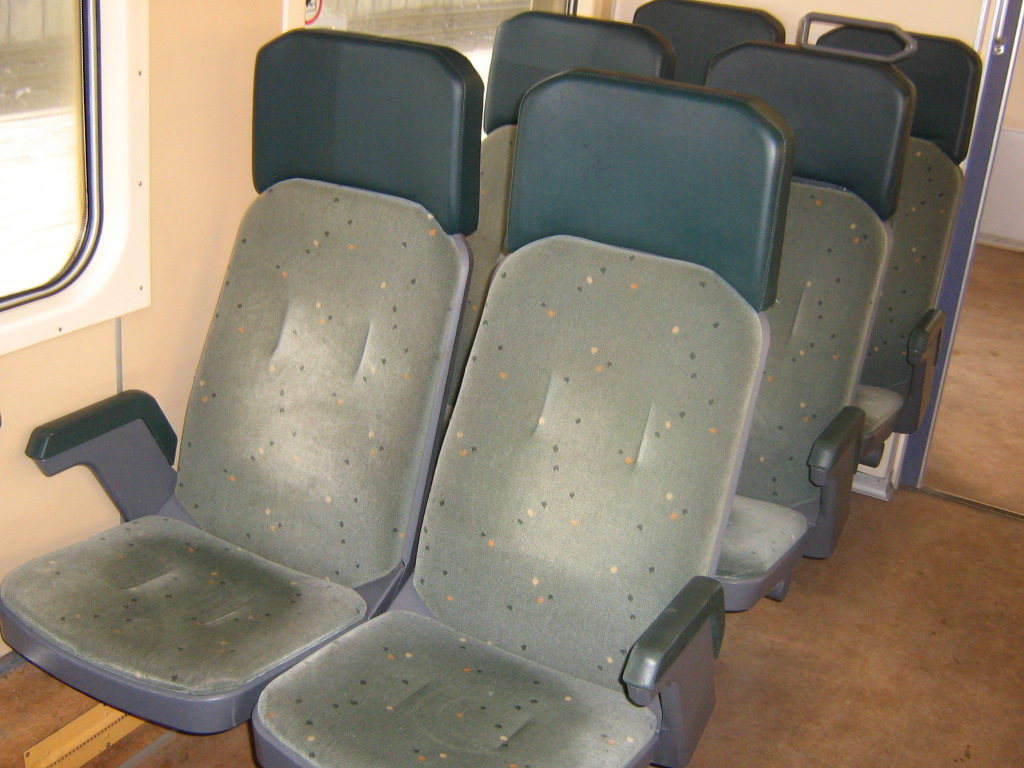
Second Class Seating in Plan T
