= Pier Bucci =

Chilean electronic music producer

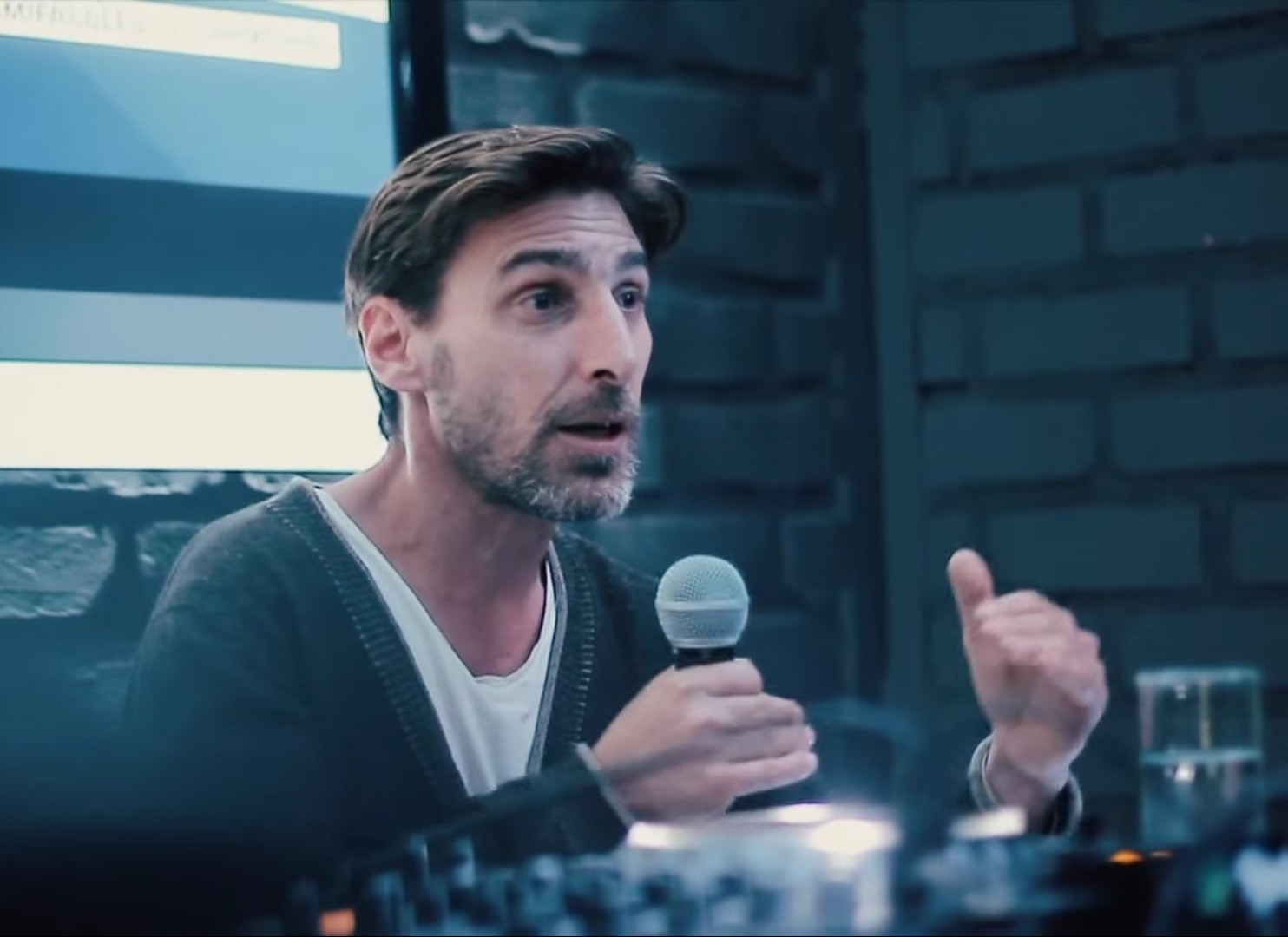

Background information
- Born: Pier Bucci
- Origin: Santiago de Chile, Chile
- Genres: Electronica
- Occupation(s): producer, musician
- Years active: 1996–present
- Labels: Cosmo Records, Alphabet City, Crosstown Rebels, Maruca, Katermukke, Diamonds & Pearls Music, Recognition, Get Physical Music, Vinylclub, Monique Chronique
- Website: Website

Pier Bucci is a Chilean electronic music producer . He is known for his solo work and for his role in the groups Mambotur, Skipsapiens, Monne Automne and Bucci (with his brother Andrés Bucci). He is one of three Bucci brothers – Juan Pablo, Pier and Andrés – all of whom are electronic music producers.

Like his brother Andrés, Pier combines Latin rhythms with German style, as a result of his Chilean origin and the influence of the music scene of Berlin, his home since 2002.

== Career ==
Pier Bucci was born in Santiago, Chile and grew up in the "Bucci Gallery" in the city centre. The gallery was one of the few places that offered art exhibition space in the Chilean military regime, and was one of the cultural bastions of the last years of the dictatorship, welcoming emerging avant-garde painters as well as punk and 80s new wave musicians.

Pier's first track "Yahow" was included on the album Ruta 5: Austral (2000), a compilation of Chilean electronic music. In 2002, he moved to Berlin, Germany with his brother Andrés (Plan V) and together, as the duo Bucci, they recorded an EP also entitled "Bucci". Pier also took part in projects like Skipsapiens with Danieto, Monne Automne with Luciano (of Lucien-n-Luciano), and Mambotur with Argenis Brito.

In 2003, the Bucci duo had their debut release with the track "Dude" and came in at number 8 in the specialist De:Bug magazine chart, performing in several Berlin clubs. Also in 2003, Bucci appeared in the "Canción Electrónica" ("Electronic Song" in English) compilation album from Argentina's Indice Virgen Records, as well as the "Colores Compilation" album from Mexico's Mil Records. He has produced for Lo-Fi Stereo and Crosstown Rebels, and has released on Luciano's Cadenza label. He also had a track featured on Cocoon Recordings' 'Cocoon Compilation F'.

Pier recorded his first solo album "Familia" in 2005, with collaborations from Macha (Lafloripondio) and the voice of Armelle Pioline (Holden).

In 2009, Pier launched his own label, Maruca Music, which has to date featured his own new original music along with remixes from heavyweights like Baby Ford and Thomas Melchior. He also has plans to bring back his much-loved Mambotur project with the Venezuelan Argenis Brito.

Pier's second album, “Amigo” (2010), included collaborations from Jorge González as well as repeat appearances from Macha and Pioline.

== Discography ==
=== Albums ===
- Familia (Crosstown Rebels – 2005 / CD Promo, CD Album, 12")
- Amigo (Maruca – 2010 / CD, Album, Promo, Car)
- Pier Bucci & Red Robin – Analogue Connection (Katermukke – 2013 / 4xFile, MP3, 320)

=== Singles, EPs and others ===
- Lucien–N–Luciano / Pier Bucci – Stone Age / Amael (Cadenza −2004 / 12" 2xFile, MP3, 320)
- Advance Romance (Crosstown Rebels – 2004 / 12")
- Cinetico Andino EP (Crosstown Rebels – 2005 / 12", W/Lbl, EP, Sti)
- Familia Remix EP 1 and Tita / L'Nuit (Crosstown Rebels – 2006 / CDr, Promo, 12", EP)
- Familia Remix EP 2 (Crosstown Rebels – 2006 / 3xFile, MP3, EP, 320, 12", W/Lbl, Promo, Sti, CDr, Promo, EP)
- Chiloé EP (Crosstown Rebels – 2007 / 12", EP, CDr, Promo)
- Hay Consuelo (Vendetta Records – 2007 / W/Lbl, 12", Promo, Ltd, S/Sided)
- Pier Bucci & Jacek Sienkiewicz – Eastern Promises Pt 2 ( Maruca – 2009 / 12")
- Pier Bucci & Monochrome (10) – Santiago De Bucarest ( Maruca – 2009 / 12")
- Dinky & Matthew Styles / Pier Bucci – Phantasma Vol.2 ( Diamonds & Pearls Music – 2009 / 12")
- Pier Bucci & Jacek Sienkiewicz – Eastern Promises ( Recognition – 2009 / 12")
- Amigo EP 1 ( Maruca – 2009 / 12", EP)
- Amigo ( Maruca – 2010 / 12")
- Pier Bucci, Argenis Brito – Rabat (Cosmo Records – 2012 / 12", Ltd)
- Canto Libre ( Vinylclub – 2013 / 12")
- Pier Bucci Feat. Argenis Brito – Atacama EP ( Get Physical Music – 2013 / 2xFile, MP3, EP, 320)
- Pipo Torrez (Monique Chronique – 2010 / 2xFile, MP3, 320)
- Mambotur, with Argenis Brito; Skipsapiens, with Danieto; Monne Automne with Luciano (Lucien-n-Luciano), Iskrenne with Ian C and the duo Bucci with his brother Andrés.
