= NS Mat '54 =

Dutch electric multiple unit train

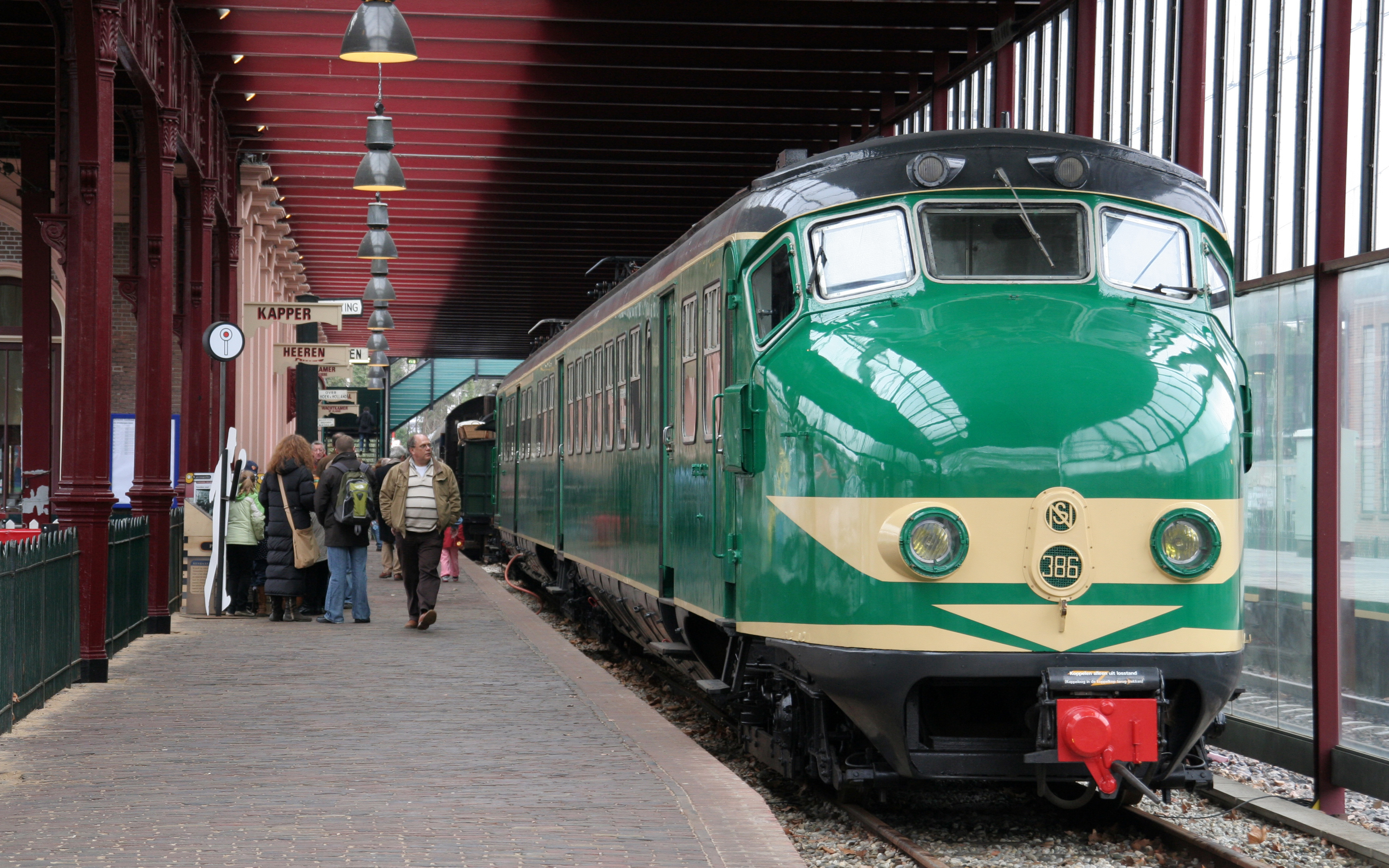
- A NS Mat '54 at the National Railway Museum in original coloring. The number of the train is visible in the air horns outlets between the headlights.
- Stock type: Electric multiple unit
- In service: 1956-1996
- Manufacturer: Allan & Co. Beijnes; Werkspoor
- Constructed: 1956-1962 (ElD-2 and ElD-4); 1957 (Benelux)
- Retired: Plan F/G/M: 1993; Plan P/Q: 1996; Benelux: 1988
- Number built: ElD-2: 68; ElD-4: 73; Benelux: 12
- Diagram: ElD-2 (two-car set); ElD-4 (four-car set); Benelux (multi-voltage two-car set)
- Fleet numbers: ElD-2: Plan F: 321-334; Plan G: 335-350; Plan M: 351-365; Plan Q: 371-393 ElD-4: Plan F: 711-741; Plan G: 742-757 (758 (Note: Was trainset 747 until 1990.)); Plan P: 761-786 Benelux: NS: 1201-1208; NMBS: 220.901-220.904
- Capacity: ElD-2: 137/138; ElD-4: 280/278; Benelux: 118/119
- Operators: Nederlandse Spoorwegen; Benelux: NS/SNCB

Specifications
- Train length: Over buffers: ElD-2 and Benelux: 50.4 m (165 ft 4 in); ElD-4: 98.6 m (323 ft 6 in)
- Doors: ElD-2: 3 per side ElD-4: 7 per side Benelux: 3 per side (excl. baggage compartment doors)
- Maximum speed: 140 km/h (87 mph)
- Weight: ElD-2: 110 t (110 long tons; 120 short tons); ElD-4: 210 t (210 long tons; 230 short tons); Benelux: 115 t (113 long tons; 127 short tons)
- Power output: ElD-2 and Benelux: 680 kW (910 hp); ElD-4: 1,360 kW (1,820 hp)
- Power supply: ElD-2/4: 1500 V DC; Benelux: 1500/3000 V DC
- UIC classification: ElD-2 and Benelux: Bo'2' + 2'Bo'; ElD-4: Bo'Bo' + 2'2' + 2'2' + Bo'Bo'
- Coupling system: Scharfenberg
- Track gauge: 1,435 mm (4 ft 8 1/2 in)

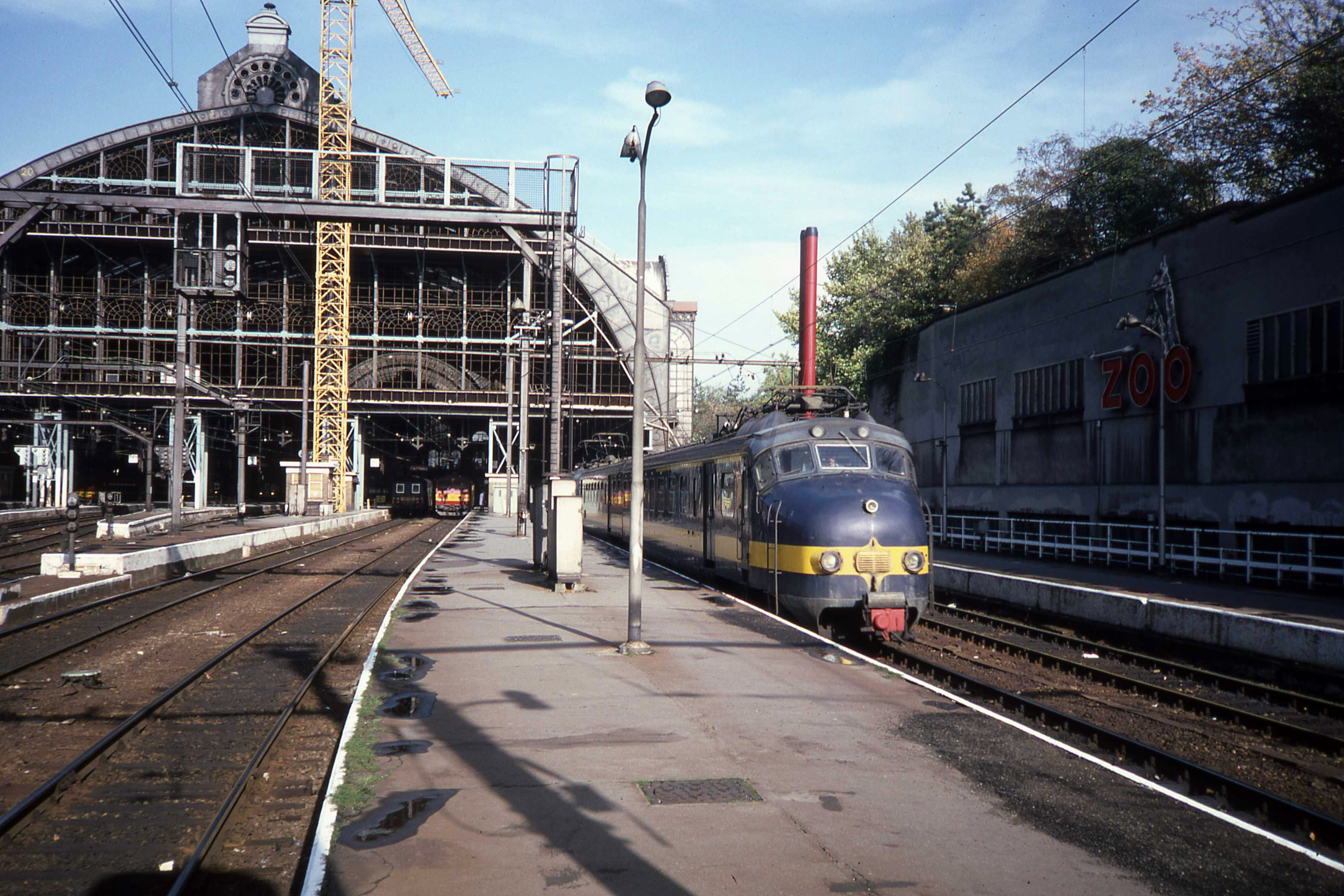
A NS Mat '57 at Antwerp Central Station in 1986.

The NS Mat '54 or Materieel '54 was an electric multiple unit train, used by the Dutch State-owned railways from 1956 until 1996. The typical nose of the train was designed for extra safety for the train driver. The public gave the train a nickname: Doghead (Hondekop).

The trains were built by Allan of Rotterdam, Beijnes and Werkspoor. Equipped with a Scharfenberg coupler, they could run in series. Not only with the same model but also with older models, the NS Mat '35, NS Mat '36, NS Mat '40 and NS Mat '46.

The trains were intended for express train services. Rapid acceleration was of less importance than comfort and therefore the trains were solidly constructed, which resulted in a relatively high weight per seat and gave a very smooth and (for that time) very comfortable run. It is still the heaviest passenger train type to ever ride a European railway. The train needed three minutes to accelerate to a speed of a 120 km/h.

A variant is the NS Mat '57 for Benelux-service which was equipped to ride with the difference in electric current used on the Dutch and Belgian railways so it could connect Amsterdam, The Hague and Rotterdam with Antwerp and Brussels.

From 1954 till 1962 a total of 153 were built: 73 models with four coaches, 68 with two coaches and 12 for the Benelux-service consisting of two coaches. The trains were painted in green and yellow. In 1968 a new yellow blue color scheme was introduced. It took until 1980 until the last train was painted in new colors. The reason that it took twelve years was because the green paint lasted very well and the Dutch railways tried to cut costs wherever possible. The Benelux models were painted dark blue and yellow.

Two of the trains were involved in the 1975 Dutch train hostage crisis and 1977 Dutch train hijacking.
