= Danieto =

- Also known as: Danieto, Skipsapiens, ADN
- Born: Daniel Nieto
- Origin: Santiago de Chile, Chile
- Genres: Electronica, experimental
- Occupations: Engineer, record producer, musician, visual artist
- Years active: 1998–present
- Labels: Impar, U-Cover Records, Level Records, Pueblo nuevo, Yuki Yaki, Ojo de Apolo
- Website: Official website

Daniel Nieto is a Chilean electronic music producer, engineer, and visual artist born in Santiago, Chile. He is known for his solo work under the name "Danieto" as well as for his role as a member of the group Skipsapiens, along with Pier Bucci. Daniel Nieto began his career in the late 1990s, influenced by the intelligent dance music movement in the UK. Daniel is also one of the founders of the netlabel Impar.

== Career ==
Under the name "ADN" (Spanish for DNA), Daniel released his first album "Granel" in 2000, as well as the EP "Hormiga", produced by the Chilean label Ojo de Apollo. That same year some of his tracks appeared on the compilation "CODA.05", and later, in 2002, he contributed two tracks to the Ojo de Apollo compilation "CODA.09".

In 2001 Skipsapiens released the eponymous album "Skipsapiens" under the Belgian label "U-Cover". More recently, the same label released the CD "Evolución al Origen" on a limited release of only 95 copies, comprising seven of Daniel's best tracks recorded between 1999 and 2003.

Daniel also took part in two re-mixed albums: “Re'Processed – Interkontinentale Remixe” by “Process” (Steve Gary Barnes), a 2002 12” vinyl for the German label “Traum”; and "Re-mixed, Re-worked, Re-constructed and Re-invented Part One" for the Belgian label U-Cover, also in 2002.

In 2004, Daniel and his business partner Claudio Cisterna won funding from the Chilean governmental program (Fondart) to finance his project for a netlabel. With this funding they created "Impar", a netlabel that promotes experimental electronic music and new artists, offers free downloads, and hosts many of Danieto's tracks in the Impar music library available to download free.

In 2005, Daniel released his first LP, "Cirugía Casual", under the label U-Cover, and, with Pier Bucci as Skipsapiens, released "Skipsapiens-eco" under the label Mutek. He also remixed Hans Carstens' track "Compacto (pn003)" for the label Pueblo Nuevo and that same year performed in Mexico City, Montreal, and Valparaíso, Chile

In 2006, he released two new albums for U-Cover, one called "Contemplación de la Vida Inerte" (English: Contemplation of the Inert Life), with Claudio Cisterna as “Danieto + Flipper”, and one called “Multitono”. He also released the album “Agranelado” for the label Pueblo Nuevo.

Since then, most of his albums have been released under Impar, his own label.

== Discography ==
Albums

- Evolución Al Origen (CDr, Album, Ltd) U-Cover CDr Limited – 2004
- Cirugía Casual (CD, Album) U-Cover – 2005
- Prebuffer – Abducibot (CD, Album, RE, Ltd) U-Cover Transparente – 2006
- Danieto + Flipper (4) – Multitono (CD, Album, Ltd) U-Cover Transparente – 2006
- Contemplación De La Vida Inerte (CDr, Album, Ltd) CDr Limited – 2006

Singles & EPs

- Agranelado EP (4xFile, MP3, EP, 192) Pueblo Nuevo – 2006
- Ciencias Incultas E.P. (5xFile, MP3, EP, 320) Miga – 2008
- Nueva Estación EP (12", EP) Level Records – 2010

Miscellaneous

- Danieto + Flipper (4) – PanCromatico (7xFile, MP3) Impar – 2004
- Pre Buffer (6xFile, MP3) Impar −2004
- Abducibot (7xFile, MP3) Impar −2005
- Ruta 5: Austral (2000 – Edición extranjera)
- Mutek 05 (2005 – Edición extranjera)
- Memorias de un calabozo (2006 – Pueblo Nuevo)
- Multitono (2006 – Edición extranjera)
- Música chilena de raíz electrónica (2007 – Pueblo Nuevo)
- Epa Toasted (2008 – Epa Sonidos)
- Impar 10 (2009 – Impar)
- Fluorescence (2012 – Epa Sonidos)
