= Elena Waiss =

Chilean pianist

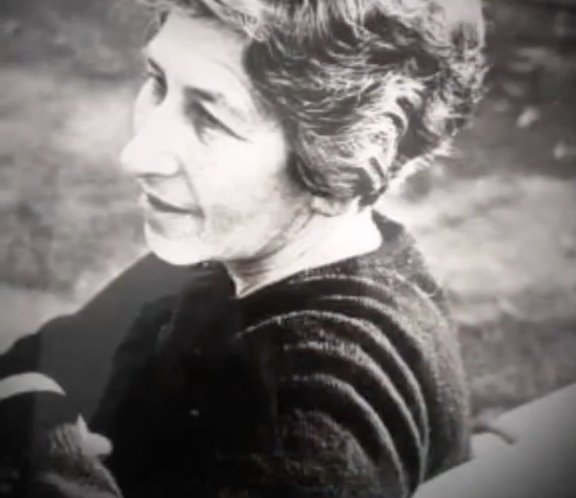
Elena Waiss

Elena Waiss (née, Elena Waiss Band; October 21, 1908 - May 22, 1988) was a Chilean pianist. She was the founder and director of the Escuela Moderna de Música y Danza (EMMD) (Modern School of Music and Dance) and author of texts for musical initiation such as Mi amigo el piano. She also served as a harpsichordist and pianist for the Chilean Symphony Orchestra.

== Biography ==
Waiss was born in Concepción, Chile on October 21, 1908. After some years, she arrived in the city of Santiago accompanying her mother, Anna Band, who was a piano teacher.

Waiss was a close friend of Chilean pianist Claudio Arrau. She was a member of the Chilean Symphony Orchestra for more than 20 years performing as a pianist, in charge of the Celesta and as a harpsichord soloist, which was really her passion.

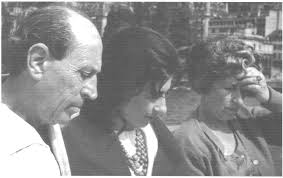
Zoltán Fischer, Edith Fischer and Elena Waiss (l-r)

Waiss married the violinist Zoltán Fischer with whom she had two children, pianist Edith Fischer and violinist Edgar Fischer. The marriage lasted until Fischer's death in September 1970, from a heart attack while performing on tour in Mexico.

Waiss dedicated her life to teaching music and the expansion of culture in Chile. Among her great works is the establishment of the EMMD on May 10, 1940 together with the Chilean musicians René Amengual, Alfonso Letelier, and Juan Orrego-Salas. It was the first institution of higher education in Chile specialized in music and dance careers. She was also a great piano teacher. During her period as director of the EMMD, she taught several Chilean musicians and pianists such as Rosita Renard, Ena Bronstein, Lionel Party, Edith Fischer, Patricia Parraguez, Max Valdés, Femando Torm, Julio Laks, Bárbara Perelman, Adriana Balter, and Carla Davanzo.

Waiss made compilations of works for children that were disseminated in Chile and around the world such as Mi amigo el piano, Los maestros del clavecín and Selección de clásicos that have multiple editions. In addition to music, she showed a great interest in psychology, painting, theater, and especially literature, always being aware of everything related to music culture. All of this formed her into a humanistic personality that her closest friends could notice.

She died in Santiago, May 22, 1988.

== Publications ==
- 1947, Mi amigo el piano, musical score (4th edition, 1995, EMMD)
  - Mon ami le piano, musical score in French. (1984, Kunzelmann)
  - Mein Freund das Klavier , musical score in German. (1984, Kunzelmann)
- 1950, Selección de clásicos, musical score with René Amengual (5th edition, EMMD)
- 1954, Los maestros del clavecín, musical score with René Amengual (3rd edition, 1954, Universitaria)
