= Instituto Profesional de Chillán Televisión =

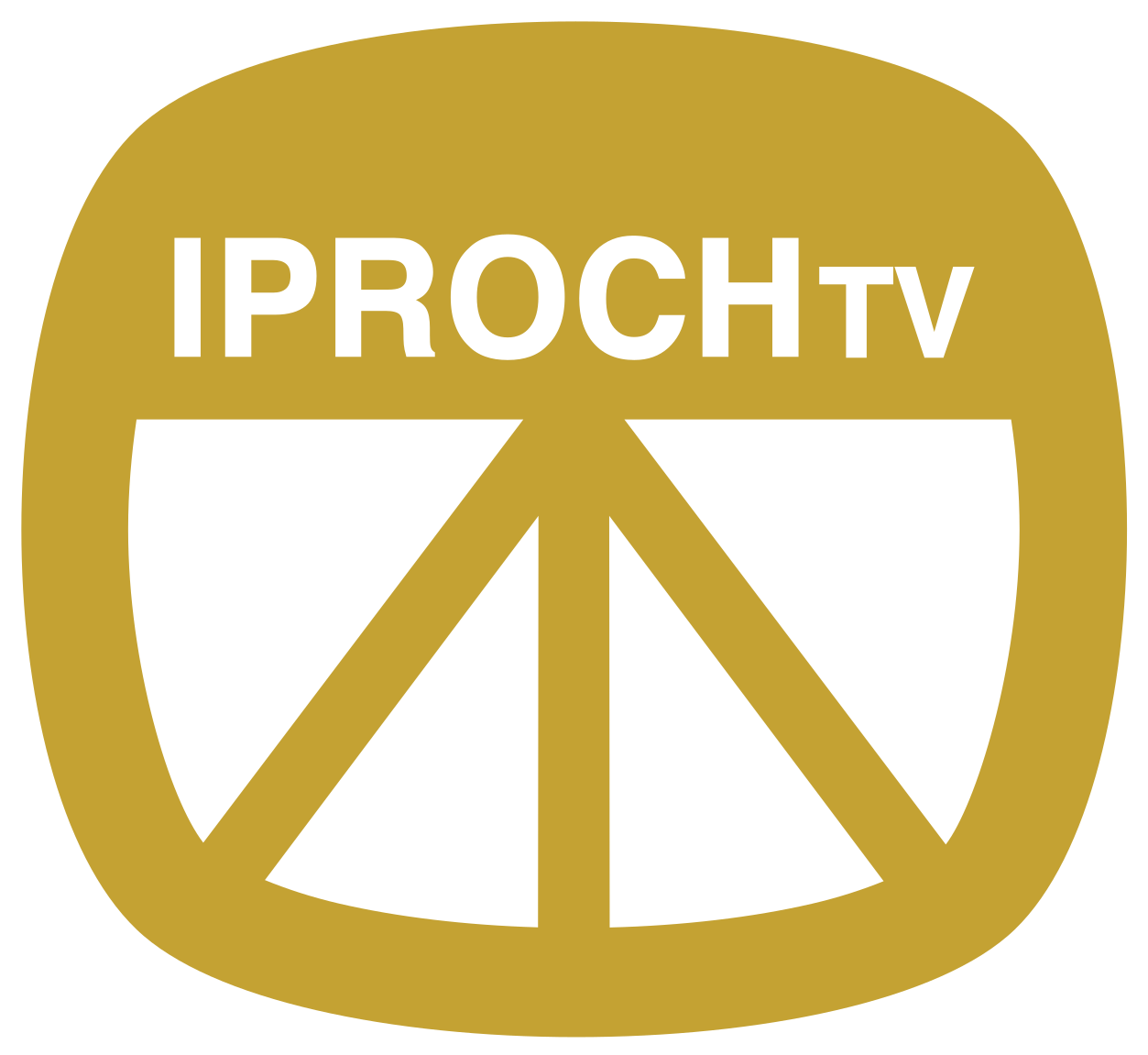

Ownership
- Owner: Professional Institute of Chillán

History
- Launched: December 24, 1983
- Closed: December 31, 1993
- Replaced by: Chilevisión relay

Availability

Terrestrial
- Analog (Chillán): 10

Instituto Profesional de Chillán Televisión, also known as Iproch TV or simply Canal 10, was a local Chilean television channel, based in the city of Chillán, current capital of the Ñuble Region. Currently its frequency is used by Chilevisión.

== History ==
The origins of local television in Chillán date back to 1982, when the rector of the Chillán Professional Institute (Iproch), Carlos Polanco, together with professor Norman Ahumada Gallardo, developed a tele-education project, which the following year would become a local television channel, officially beginning its broadcasts on December 24, 1983. Shortly after, an agreement with Universidad de Chile Televisión began to retransmit its programming on tape delay, which will continue for the rest of Iproch TV's existence.

Around 1984, the channel's offices were on the fourth floor of the Iproch Headquarters, located at 18 de Septiembre 580, in front of the city's Plaza de Armas, and its team was made up of 9 people, as well as collaborators and commentators, while the transmissions covered an approximate radius of 5 kilometers. Among the technical milestones that it had in its first year of life was the live broadcast of the musical festival "Canta Chillán".

The channel served as a breeding ground for professionals who later worked in other media, such as the journalist Carolina Jiménez Mery, who would become a news presenter for Mega, Chilevisión, TVN and Channel 13. The announcer Artemio Gutiérrez served in the reading from the news program Panorama de Ñuble between 1986 and 1987. Different programming milestones also occurred, such as the broadcast of Colo Colo's matches in the Copa Libertadores 1991 or the funeral of Claudio Arrau in the same year.

In 1990, Norman Ahumada left the management of Iproch TV, being replaced by engineer Domingo Díaz. On March 11, 1991, a fire completely destroyed the channel's facilities, including its audiovisual archive, so in the following months the Pro-Recovery Committee of Channel 10 was formed, headed by the governor of the province of Ñuble, Carlos Abel Jarpa and who sought to raise funds to rebuild the television station; Through this campaign, 18 million pesos were raised to purchase a one-kilowatt antenna and transmitter manufactured in the United States. At the end of October 1991, transmissions were restarted, this time under the name of Canal 11 RTU Chillán and moving its frequency from channel 10 to 11 due to a rearrangement of frequencies given the arrival of Megavisión to the area through channel 9.

At the end of 1993 the signal closed due to the imminent arrival of the Chilevisión channel, successor signal to the University of Chile channel and legal owner of the channel's frequency in Chillán. Chilevisión began its transmissions in Chillán on January 1, 1994 through channel 11.

== Local programs ==
- Panorama de Ñuble (news)
- El Tiempo (weather)
- Teledeporte (sports)
- Hablemos de... (talk)
