= Amengual =

Amengual is a Catalan surname. Notable people with the surname include:

- Claudia Amengual (born 1969), Uruguayan writer and translator
- René Amengual (1911–1954), Chilean composer, educator and pianist
