= Mojsisovics =

Mojsisovics von Mojsvár is a surname. Notable people with the surname include:

- Johann August Georg Edmund Mojsisovics von Mojsvar (1839–1907), Austro-Hungarian geologist and palaeontologist
- Roderich Mojsisovics von Mojsvar (1877–1953), Austrian composer
