= Martin Krause =

German pianist (1853–1918)

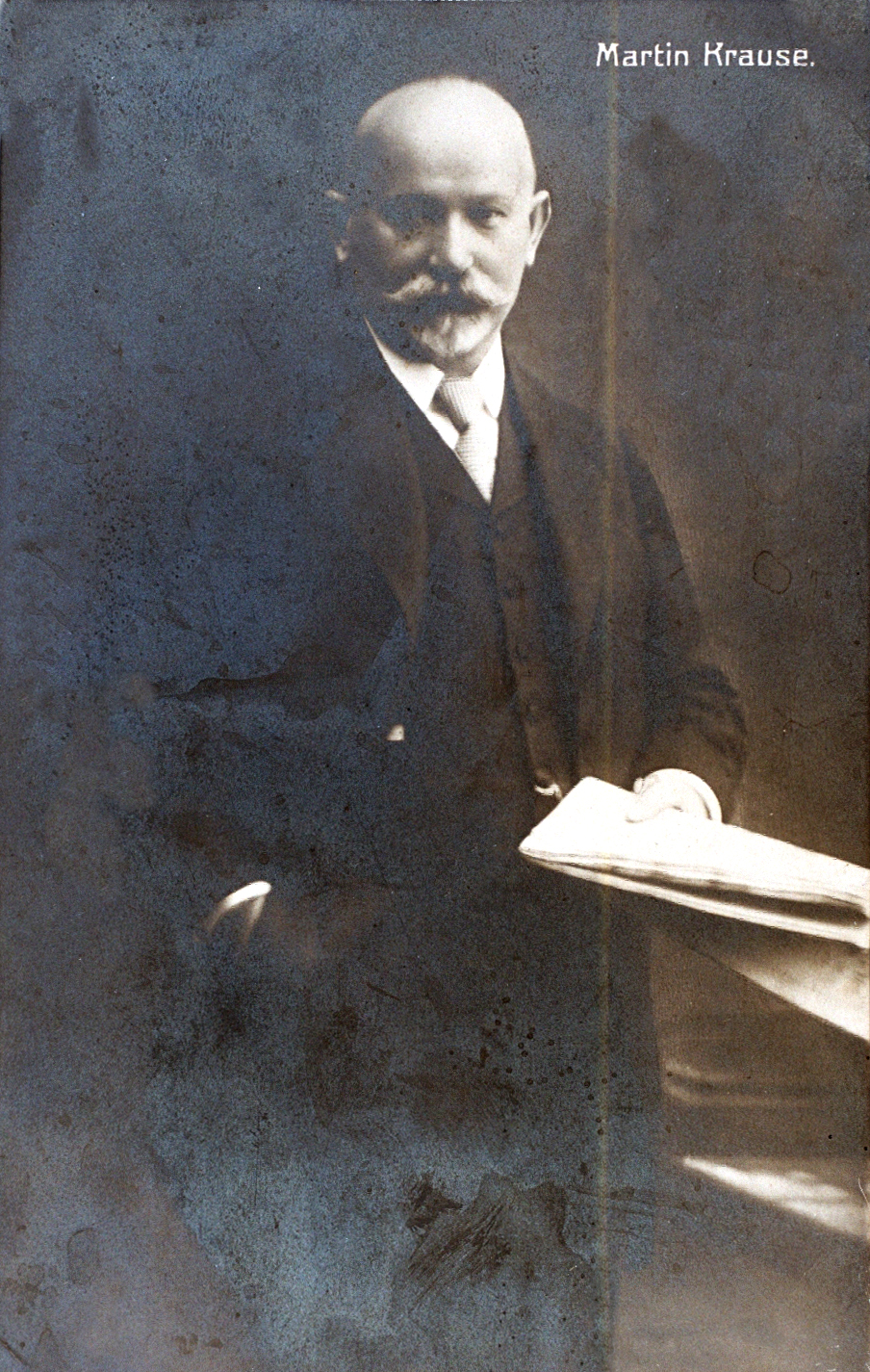
- Born: June 17, 1853; Lobstädt, Saxony, German Confederation
- Died: August 2, 1918 (aged 65); Plattling, Germany
- Occupations: Concert pianist; piano teacher; music critic; writer
- Known for: Promoting Liszt tradition, interpretations of Beethoven's music
- Notable work: Wagner-Kalender 1908

Martin Krause (17 June 1853 – 2 August 1918) was a German concert pianist, piano teacher, music critic, and writer.

== Career ==
Krause was born in Lobstädt, Saxony as the youngest son of the choirmaster and church schoolmaster Johann Carl Friedrich Krause in Lobstädt. He initially attended the teacher training college in Borna, then at the Leipzig Conservatory with Ernst Ferdinand Wenzel and Carl Reinecke. He performed on the concert platform in 1878–80 but stopped because of a nervous breakdown.

In 1882, he became a pupil of Franz Liszt and studied his technique; he was later among Liszt's most prominent promoters. Krause later established himself as a piano teacher and writer on music in Leipzig, where he was one of the founders of the Franz-Liszt-Verein association. From 1900, he also taught in Dresden. From 1901, Krause worked as a professor at the Royal Academy of Music in Munich, and from at least 1896 to 1911 at the Stern Conservatory in Berlin. His notable pupils there include Claudio Arrau, Edwin Fischer and Rosita Renard.

In addition to his work nurturing the Liszt tradition, Krause was also known for his interpretations of Beethoven's music.

A victim of the 1918 Spanish flu pandemic, he died in Plattling that year.

== Works ==
- Wagner-Kalender 1908 aus Anlass des 25. Todestages Richard Wagners (Wagner-Almanac 1908 on the occasion of the 25th anniversary of the death of Richard Wagner), edited by Søren Kruse, Danmark, 1961.

== Pupils ==
- Claudio Arrau (1903–1991) – Krause on Arrau: "Dieses Kind soll mein Meisterstück werden." ("This child is meant to become my masterpiece.")
- Edwin Fischer (1886–1960)
- Lisy Fischer (1900–1999)
- Eva Limiñana (1895–1953)
- Manuel Ponce (1882–1948)
- Harry Puddicombe (1870–1953)
- Rosita Renard (1894–1949)
- Grete von Zieritz (1899–2001)
