= Yūko Shiokawa =

Japanese violinist (born 1946)

- Born: June 1, 1946; Tokyo, Japan
- Other name: 塩川 悠子
- Occupation: Violinist
- Spouse: András Schiff

Yūko Shiokawa (塩川 悠子, Shiokawa Yūko) is a Japanese violinist, born June 1, 1946.

== Biography ==
Shiokawa was born in Tokyo and started studying violin when she was 5. In 1957, her family emigrated to Peru, where she studied with Eugen Cremer and started to give concerts. In 1963, she began master classes with Wilhelm Stross in Munich, and with Sándor Végh in Salzburg starting in 1968.

When she was 19, she received the Preis der Deutschen Musikhochschulen and the Mendelssohn Prize.

Shiokawa began her professional career in 1963, performing with the Bavarian Radio Symphony Orchestra under Rafael Kubelík and the Berlin Philharmonic under Herbert von Karajan. Since then, she has played with most of the major orchestras in Europe, the United States, Japan, and Israel.

She has also been active in chamber music and solo recitals, especially with her husband, pianist András Schiff.

She has made numerous recordings, including the Mozart sonatas and the Bach solo sonatas and partitas.

In 1967, Rafael Kubelík allowed her to use the violin of his father, Jan Kubelík the Stradivarius "Emperor ex Gillot" made in 1715. She played this instrument until 2000.

== Personal life ==
Shiokawa is married to classical pianist András Schiff.
