= Edith Fischer =

Chilean pianist

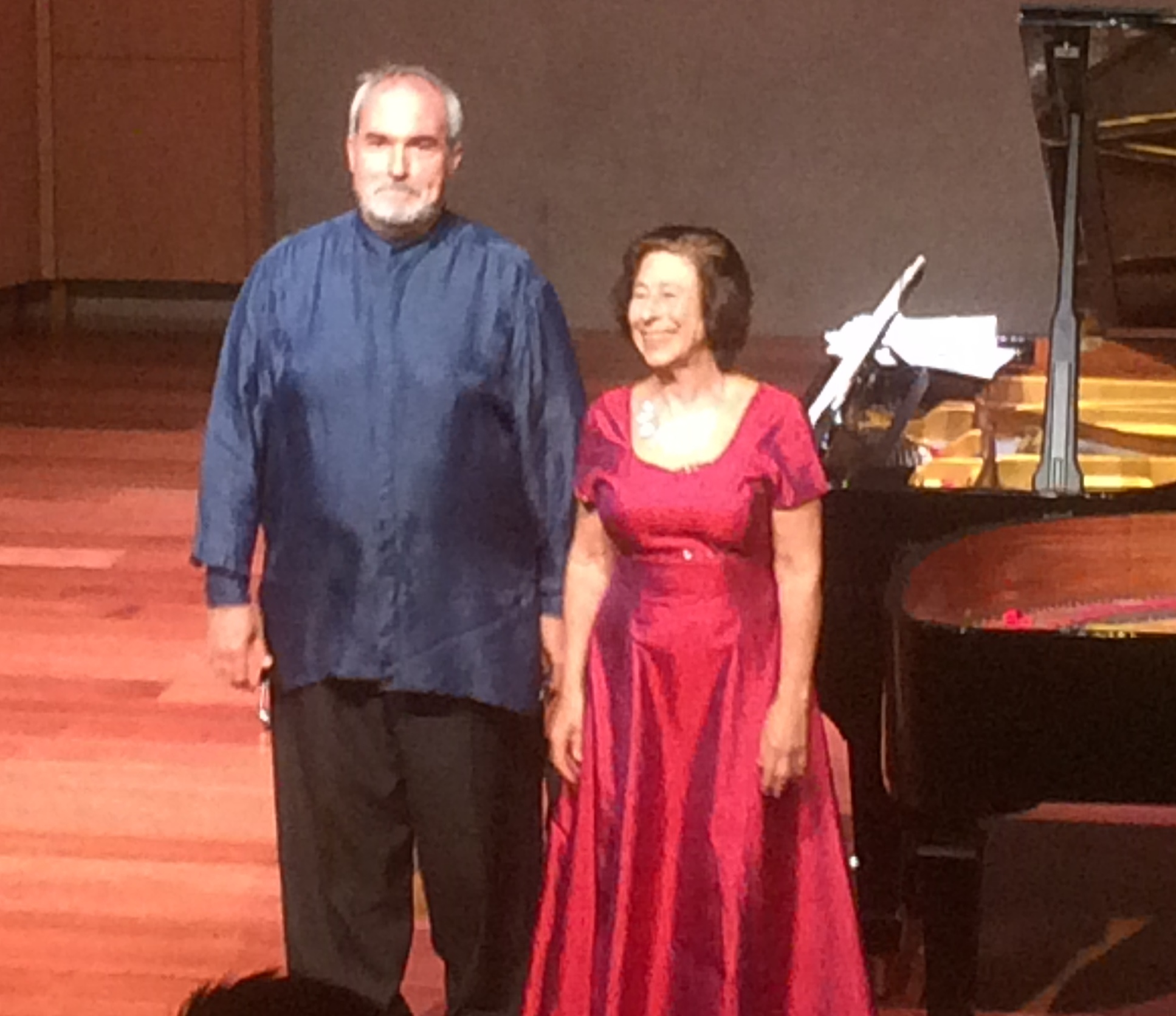
Jorge Pepi-Alos and Edith Fischer (2017)

Edith Fischer (born February 18, 1935) is a Chilean pianist. She is notable for her renditions of the full cycle of Beethoven's Piano Sonatas, which she has performed live twelve times.

== Biography ==
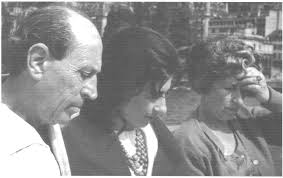
Zoltán Fisher, Edith Fisher, and Elena Waiss (l-r)

Fischer was born in Santiago, on February 18, 1935. Her mother, Elena Waiss, played the piano and harpsichord, and her father, Zoltán Fischer (1910-1970), the violin. Likewise, her brother, Edgar Fischer, plays the cello; her nephew, Rodolfo, is a conductor; and her niece, Alicia, plays the violin.

Fischer's mother was her first teacher. At age 12, she played Mozart's Piano Concerto in G major with an orchestra at the request of Hermann Scherchen, with the National Symphony Orchestra of Chile.

Between 1952 and 1954, Fischer was a student of Claudio Arrau in New York City, with a scholarship that she obtained to travel to the United States. About Arrau as a teacher, she points out: "Arrau as a teacher instilled in us that we should not imitate, but that each one had to find his own personality as a performer." She was also a student of the pianist Dinu Lipatti.

Fischer has toured South and North America, as well as India, Israel, and Japan. She is also a soloist in international orchestras. She has performed the cycle of Beethoven 32 sonatas as well as the complete piano work of Maurice Ravel. The complete cycle of Beethoven sonatas has been performed 12 times live.

In 1989, Fischer created the "International Piano Week Festival" in Blonay, Switzerland. In 2007, Fischer returned to live in Chile. Her husband is the pianist, Jorge Pepi-Alos, with whom she forms a piano duo. Jorge Pepi-Alos, officiated the August 2021 festival season alone as his wife remained in Chile for health reasons.

== Awards ==
Fischer is the recipient of the Dinu Lipatti award in London, and the first prize at the Munich International Competition.

National Music Award, President of the Republic of Chile, together with Mauricio Redolés and Chabelita Fuentes, in 2022

== Discography ==
- Camille Saint-Saëns, Claude Starck: Violoncello. English Chamber Orchestra, Peter-Lukas Graf, Edith Fischer. Claves, 1975
- Beethoven – Sonata No. 16 Op. 31,1, G Major / Sonata No. 17 Op. 31,2, D Minor. Claves, 1987
- Schumann, Mendelssohn, Brahms: Obras para piano. Claves, 1988
- The Complete Sonatas of Beethoven. Olympia, 1989
- Ravel / Debussy. His Master's Voice
