= Rosita Renard =

Chilean musician

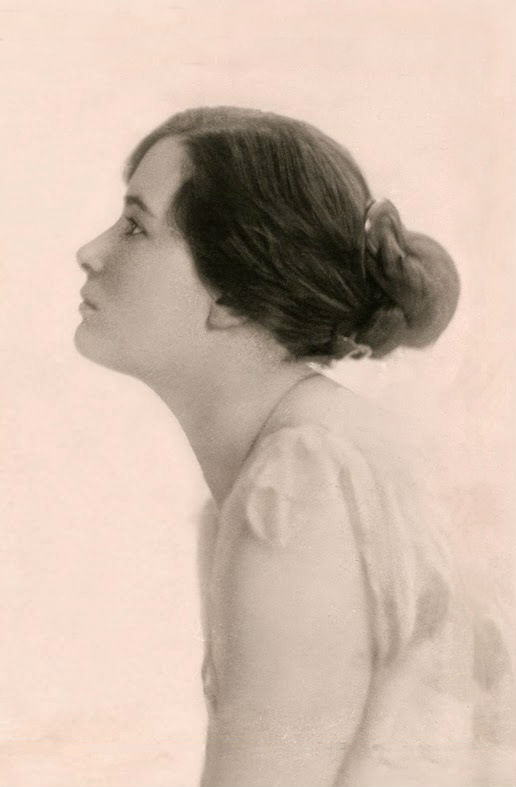
- Rosita Renard, from a 1917 publication.
- Born: Rosa Amelia Renard Artigas; 8 February 1894; Santiago
- Died: 24 May 1949 (aged 55); Santiago
- Occupation: Pianist

Rosita Renard (real name Rosa Amelia Renard Artigas, February 8, 1894, in Santiago de Chile – May 24, 1949, in Santiago de Chile) was a Chilean classical pianist.

== Early life ==
Rosa Amelia Renard Artigas was born in Santiago, the daughter of a Catalan building contractor, José Renard, and his Chilean wife, Carmen Artigas. Her younger sister Blanca Renard was also an internationally-acclaimed pianist, who later taught in Alabama. Rosa studied in Germany under Martin Krause, and won the Liszt Prize while in Berlin. She was a mentor to young Claudio Arrau when they were both students.

== Career ==
Renard played a Grieg concerto with the Chilean Symphony Orchestra at age 14. She toured as accompanist with American singer Geraldine Farrar in 1919. From 1930, she worked at the Chilean National Conservatory, teaching in the piano department until 1936. She continued touring occasionally, and performed in Canada, Mexico, and throughout South America, as well as in many American cities.

The highest point of her career came after 1945, when she started an artistic cooperation with conductor Erich Kleiber. She gave a recital at Carnegie Hall on January 19, 1949. The concert was recorded and has since been released on LP and CD.

== Personal life ==
Renard married a Czech singer, Otto Stern, in 1928. She died in Santiago soon after her Carnegie Hall recital, in May 1949, aged 55 years, after contracting a rare and fatal form of sleeping sickness from a mosquito bite. In 1993 a biography of Renard by Samuel Claro was published in Spanish.
