= András Schiff =

British pianist (born 1953)

Sir András Schiff
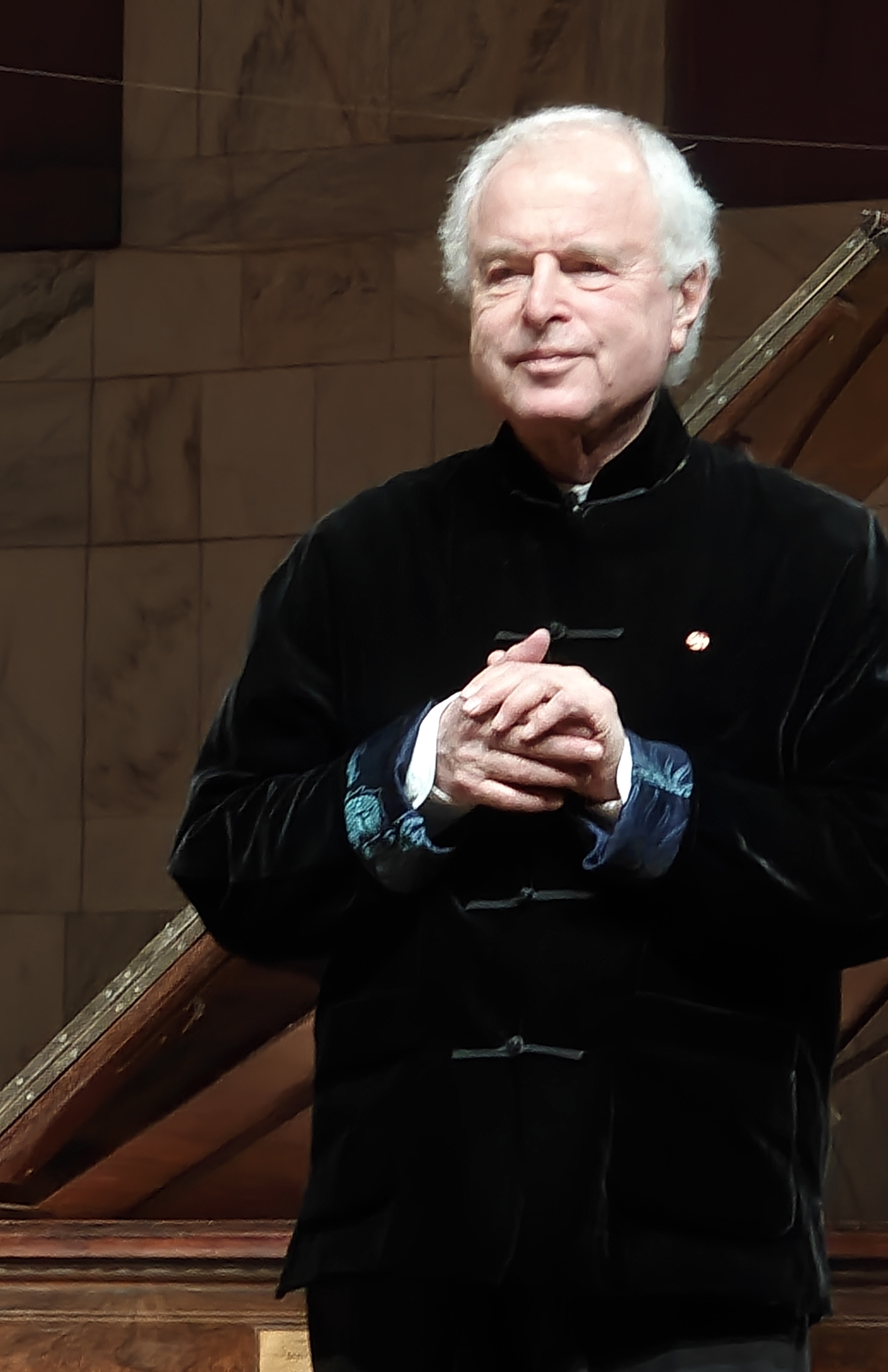
- Schiff in 2026
- Born: 21 December 1953 (age 72); Budapest, Hungarian People's Republic
- Education: Franz Liszt Academy of Music; University of Music Franz Liszt Weimar
- Occupations: Pianist; conductor
- Spouse: Yūko Shiokawa

Sir András Schiff (Hungarian: [ˈɒndraːʃ ˈʃif]; born 21 December 1953) is a Hungarian and British classical pianist and conductor. He has received numerous awards and honours, including the Grammy Award, Gramophone Award, Mozart Medal, and Royal Academy of Music Bach Prize, and was appointed Knight Bachelor in the 2014 Queen's Birthday Honours for services to music.

Schiff continues to travel widely to perform, although there are countries which he chooses not to visit because of their politics.

Schiff is a distinguished visiting professor of piano at the Barenboim–Said Akademie in Berlin, and the first artist-in-residence of the Israel Philharmonic Orchestra.

== Biography ==
Schiff was born in Budapest to a Jewish family, as an only child. He began piano lessons at age five, studying at the Franz Liszt Academy of Music in Budapest with Elisabeth Vadász, then with Pál Kadosa and Ferenc Rados. Of Rados, Schiff said, "There was never a positive word from him. Everything was bad, horrible. But it instilled a healthy attitude, an element of doubt." He also said that from Rados he learned "the main elements of piano playing, tone production, and self-control; how to listen to [oneself] and how to practise well, without wasting time, always musically, never mechanically." Among his classmates were renowned concert pianists Zoltán Kocsis and Dezső Ránki. Concurrently with his studies in Budapest, he also studied with Tatiana Nikolayeva and Bella Davidovich in summer courses at the Hochschule für Musik Franz Liszt, Weimar. He then studied in London with George Malcolm, a pioneer in the use of period keyboard instruments; Schiff made a recording with Malcolm of four-hand music by Mozart using a fortepiano that had once belonged to the composer. He also studied piano and chamber music with György Kurtág.

Schiff was fourth prize winner of the Tchaikovsky International Piano Competition in 1974 and tied with Pascal Devoyon for third prize in the Leeds International Pianoforte Competition in 1975. He emigrated from Hungary in 1979. He was unable to meet residency requirements for US citizenship due to his long absences for touring and accepted Austrian citizenship in 1987 and established homes in London and Salzburg.

From 1989 until 1998, Schiff was artistic director of the "Musiktage Mondsee" chamber music festival near Salzburg. In 1995, he co-founded the Ittingen Whitsun Concert (Ittinger Pfingstkonzerte) in Ittingen, Switzerland, together with the famed oboist Heinz Holliger. From 2004 to 2007 he was artist in residence of the Kunstfest Weimar. In the 2007–08 season he was pianist in residence of the Berlin Philharmonic. In 2011–12 he was one of the "Perspectives Artists" of Carnegie Hall.

In 1999, he formed an occasional chamber orchestra, which he named the Cappella Andrea Barca, with the name coming from an Italian translation of his last name (Barca and Schiff both mean "boat", Barca in Italian and Schiff in German), although he has provided a humorous pseudo-biography of the fictional Barca. He has appeared as a conductor with several major orchestras, including regular appearances with Philharmonia Orchestra in London and the Chamber Orchestra of Europe, and recent ones with the San Francisco Symphony and Los Angeles Philharmonic.

Schiff is one of the most renowned interpreters of Bach, Haydn, Mozart, Beethoven, Schubert and Schumann. His many recordings for the Decca label include much of the keyboard music of Bach, music of Domenico Scarlatti, Ernst von Dohnányi, Johannes Brahms, and Piotr Ilyich Tchaikovsky, the complete piano sonatas of Mozart and Schubert, and the complete piano concertos of Mozart with the Camerata Academica Salzburg led by Sándor Végh, and of Mendelssohn with Charles Dutoit. His recordings for the Teldec label include the complete piano concertos of Beethoven with the Staatskapelle Dresden led by Bernard Haitink, and of Béla Bartók with the Budapest Festival Orchestra led by Iván Fischer, as well as solo works by Haydn, Brahms, and others. Notable recordings for the ECM label include the complete piano concertos of Brahms with the Orchestra of the Age of Enlightenment, music of Janáček and Sándor Veress, major works of Schubert and Beethoven using a period fortepiano, and live recordings of all of Beethoven's piano sonatas, made in Zurich. Between 2004 and 2006 he gave a series of lecture-recitals on the complete Beethoven sonatas in London's Wigmore Hall. His live concert recordings for ECM also include his second traversals of the Bach Partitas and Goldberg Variations.

Schiff has given lectures on the interpretation of the music he plays; in 2024, he lectured at the Wigmore Hall, London on Bach's Art of Fugue, before performing the piece in the same concert.

For G. Henle, he provided fingerings for new editions of Bach's The Well-Tempered Clavier (published in 2006) and fingerings and missing cadenzas for a new edition of the Mozart piano concertos (begun in 2007).

Schiff has said he admires many pianists, including Artur Schnabel, Edwin Fischer, Alfred Cortot, Sergei Rachmaninoff, Ignaz Friedman, Josef Hofmann, Glenn Gould, Annie Fischer, Rudolf Serkin, Mieczysław Horszowski, Radu Lupu, Murray Perahia, Richard Goode and Peter Serkin.

== Teaching ==
External audio
- You may hear Andras Schiff performing Wolfgang Amadeus Mozart's Piano Concerto No. 23 in A Major, K. 488 with Sándor Vegh conducting the Camerata Academica des Mozarteums Salzburg Here on archive.org

Schiff, known for his video broadcast masterclasses, is currently on the faculty of the Barenboim–Said Akademie in Berlin, Germany, serving as distinguished visiting professor of piano. He has given masterclasses at Juilliard School, Oberlin College, and the Royal Academy of Music. He also held a series of masterclasses in 2019 at the Gstaad Menuhin Piano Festival for just seven selected students: Florian Caroubi, Pallavi Mahidhara, Nuron Mukumi, Nicolas Namoradze, Elena Nefedova, Chiara Opalio, and Shir Semmel.

== Awards and honours ==
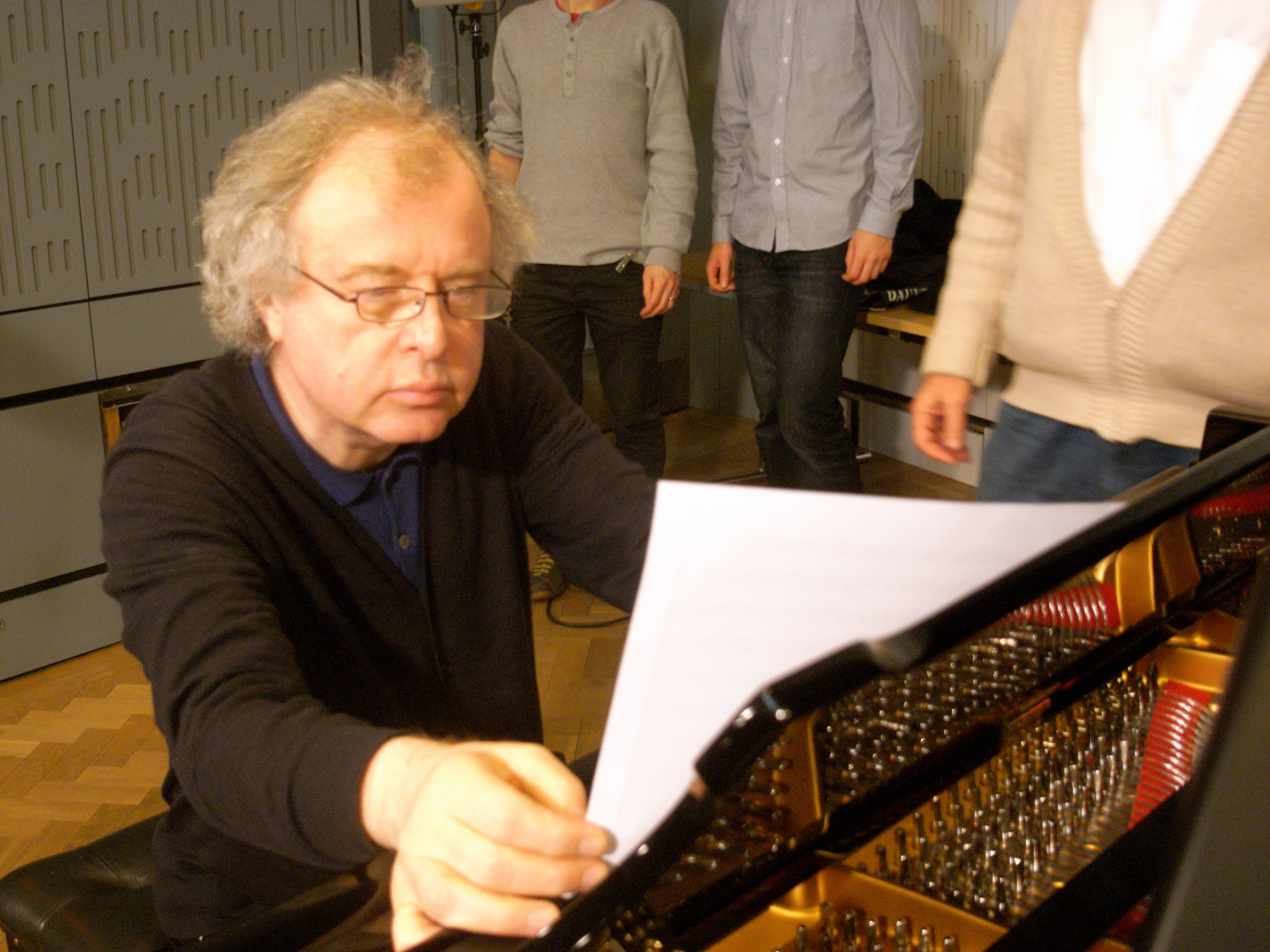
Schiff preparing to perform Brahms' newly discovered Albumblatt for BBC Radio 3, 2012

The awards that Schiff has won include a 1990 Grammy Award for Best Instrumental Soloist Performance (without orchestra) – English Suites by Bach; a 1990 Gramophone Award for a Schubert recital with Peter Schreier; the Bartók Prize in 1991; the Claudio Arrau Memorial Medal in 1994; the Kossuth Prize in 1996; the Léonie Sonning Music Prize in 1997; honorary membership in the Beethoven House in Bonn, awarded in 2006 for his complete recording of Beethoven's piano sonatas; the Italian prize, Premio della critica musicale Franco Abbiati, also for his Beethoven cycle in 2007; also in 2007, the Royal Academy of Music Bach Prize, sponsored by the Kohn Foundation, awarded to "an individual who has made an outstanding contribution to the performance and/or scholarly study of Johann Sebastian Bach"; the Wigmore Hall Medal in 2008; also in 2008, the Klavier-Festival Ruhr Prize, for outstanding pianistic achievement; the Robert Schumann Prize of the City of Zwickau in 2011; Germany's Orden Pour le mérite für Wissenschaften und Künste (2011) and in January 2012, the Golden Mozart Medal of the International Mozarteum Foundation.

He has been made an honorary professor by music academies in Budapest, Detmold and Munich and is a Special Supernumerary Fellow of Balliol College, Oxford. He is a Fellow of the Royal Northern College of Music. In December 2013, the Royal Philharmonic Society awarded him its gold medal.

He was created a Knight Bachelor in the Queen's Birthday Honours list of 2014, for services to music.

In 2018, Schiff received an honorary doctorate from Charles, Prince of Wales (later King Charles III), President of the Royal College of Music. Schiff was awarded the 2022 Bach Medal by the City of Leipzig.

In 2025 Schiff won the prestigious Praemium Imperiale award in the category 'Music'.

== Personal life ==
Schiff is married to the violinist Yūko Shiokawa. The couple have residences in London; Florence, Italy; Kamakura, Japan; and Basel, Switzerland. Schiff is a polyglot, fluent in Hungarian, English, German, Italian, French, and Russian.

== Political views ==
Schiff has made public statements about politics. He also became an outspoken critic of the Hungarian government of Viktor Orbán, whom he publicly accused of racism, anti-Semitism, and neo-fascism, stating in January 2012 that he would never again set foot in his native country. In 2026, Schiff returned to Hungary following the fall of the fifth Orbán government.

=== Austria ===
In 2000, he commented on the rise of the far-right in Austria. He subsequently gave up his Austrian citizenship and took British citizenship in 2001.

=== Hungary ===
On 1 January 2011, Schiff published a letter in The Washington Post questioning whether "Hungary is ready and worthy to take on" the rotating presidency of the council of the European Union, as it did that day, because of "racism, discrimination against the Roma, anti-Semitism, xenophobia, chauvinism and reactionary nationalism," and "the latest media laws" (referring to new media laws passed at the end of December 2010 by the government of Viktor Orbán).

On 16 January 2011, Schiff told the Frankfurter Allgemeine Zeitung that he had become "persona non grata" in Hungary and would probably never perform there again "or even visit." On 17 January he joined Hungarian conductor Ádám Fischer and six other Hungarian intellectuals and artists in publishing an open letter "To the artists of Europe and the World" protesting against "racism against Roma, with homophobia and with antisemitism" and saying that "the freedom of the media, of the arts and artists, and of those who could most effectively act against such tendencies is more and more curtailed." The letter appeared in German and in English, with a note of support from Daniel Barenboim appended. As a result of his statements, he came under attack from Hungarian nationalists.

On 14 January 2012, in an interview with the German newspaper Der Tagesspiegel, Schiff expressed his deep worries about right-wing radical gangs terrorising Roma, open antisemitism, and the very conservative chauvinism and nationalism of the ruling Fidesz party in Hungary lately. Since, as he said, "antisemitic baiting has become socially acceptable in Hungary", and he had been decried as Saujude on the Internet, he had cancelled all his concerts in Hungary, he said. In December 2012, he said to the website of Yle Uutiset (Finnish television) that he would remain in self-imposed exile from Hungary.

In December 2013, Schiff told an interviewer from the BBC that he had received anonymous threats online, stating that "If I return to Hungary, they will cut off both of my hands. I don't want to risk physical and mental assault." In addition, wrote the interviewer, "Even without that threat, Schiff says he would find it difficult to play in Hungary. Art and politics cannot be disentangled. The audience matters to performers. 'We are not naïve,' he says."

=== United States ===
In 2025, Schiff announced that he would cancel all upcoming appearances in the United States due to President Donald Trump's "unbelievable bullying" of other nations and leaders, especially President Volodymyr Zelenskyy of Ukraine. He elaborated that Trump's immigration policies “ring a bell — it rings a terrible bell. My family, my Jewish family, was deported — some to Auschwitz, and some to other concentration camps.”
