= Arrau Medal =

The Arrau Medal was established by the Robert Schumann Society to memorialize its first honorary member, Claudio Arrau, who died in 1991. The medal is awarded to a pianist who is especially committed to the spirit and tradition of Claudio Arrau's keyboard artistry.

The first recipient to be so honoured on 9 June 1994 was András Schiff. In 1997 the medal was awarded to Martha Argerich during the 6th International Schumann Festival, and in 2000 during the 7th International Schumann Festival to Murray Perahia.
