= Max Schönherr =

Austrian composer, arranger and conductor

Max Schönherr (23 November 1903 – 13 December 1984) was an Austrian composer, arranger and conductor.

== Biography ==
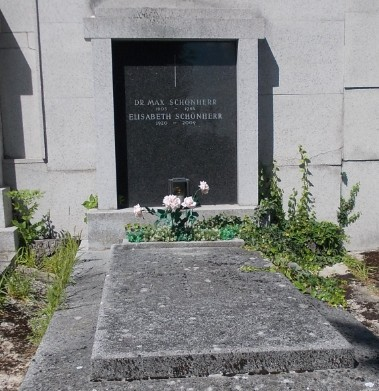
Max Schönherr's grave

Born in Maribor, Schönherr studied in Graz under Roderich Mojsisovics von Mojsvar and was a composer of light orchestral music in Vienna. He died in Baden bei Wien. Outside his native country, Schönherr was best known for his Austrian Peasant Dances Op. 14, which became widely popular internationally. His other compositions include a Concertino for Piano and small Orchestra, Festive Musical for Piano and small Orchestra, Dances of Salzburg for small or salon orchestra, Perpetual Motion Op. 29, Das Trünkene Mucklein, and the ballet Hotel Sacher.

As an arranger he prepared notable editions of music by Johann and Josef Strauß. These include the Annen-Polka, the Perpetuum mobile and Auf der Jagd by Johann, and the Delirien and Sphärenklänge waltzes by Josef. All five of these were recorded by the Berliner Philharmoniker in 1980.

=== Recordings of his music ===
Modern recordings of his work are limited to two CDs, conducted by Manfred Müssauer with the Donau Philharmonie Wien and released in 2006-7; as well as a 2-CD Introduction to his work on the Orf (Liebermann) label, consisting of older recordings. There are also a number of examples of Schönherr's work as a conductor available on disc.

Older records include a 78rpm recording (His Master's Voice C. 2905) from the late 1940s entitled Austrian Peasant Dances, which has Schönherr as the arranger: the conductor is Walter Goehr and the orchestra is listed generically as Symphony Orchestra. A well-known 1963 LP from RCA Victor (Dynagroove LSC-2677) featuring Arthur Fiedler and the Boston Pops Orchestra entitled Concert in the Park, features a Wedding March not found on His Master's Voice C. 2905; whilst that recording contains two dances not recorded on the RCA LP. The most extended recording was by Henry Krips and the Philharmonia Orchestra, recorded in 1958, comprising Hochzeitsmarsch aus Ebensee, Schuhplattler, Gugga Polka, Salzburger Schustertanz, Gstrampfter, Polsterltanz aus Ischl, Sautanz, and Bauerngalopp.
