= Grete von Zieritz =

Austrian-German composer and pianist

Grete von Zieritz (10 March 1899 – 26 November 2001) was an Austrian-German composer and pianist. She studied with Martin Krause, a student of Franz Liszt, Franz Schreker and Rudolf Maria Breithaupt. She became a composer, and music teacher. In 1939 she was the only woman at the International Music Festival in Frankfurt am Main among composers from 18 nations. In 2009 in Vienna's Donaustadt the street Zieritzgasse was named after her.

== Life ==
Grete von Zieritz was born in Vienna, Austria on 10 March 1899, into a noble family, and grew up in Vienna, Innsbruck and Graz. She received her first piano lessons at the age of six, and later studied at the Styrian Conservatory in Graz, studying piano with Hugo Kroemer and composition with Roderich Mojsisovics von Mojsvar. She gave her first concert at age eight.

Moving to Berlin in 1917, she continued her studies with Martin Krause, a student of Franz Liszt, and Rudolf Maria Breithaupt. After the successful performance of her "Japanese Songs" in 1921, she decided to become a composer. Von Zieritz worked as a music teacher at the Stern Conservatory, and continued to study in Berlin from 1926 to 1931 under Franz Schreker. She toured in Germany and abroad, often performing her own works, and won the Mendelssohn state prize for composition in 1928. She was also awarded a Schubert scholarship by the Columbia Phonograph Company of New York. In 1939 she was the only woman at the International Music Festival in Frankfurt am Main among composers from 18 nations. In 1958 the Austrian Federal President appointed her as Professor, the first woman composer to be so honoured in Austria. In 1988, on the occasion of her 89th birthday, a concert was performed in her honour, a Zigeunerkonzert, given by the Moscow Philharmonic Orchestra.

In 2009 in Vienna Donaustadt the Zieritzgasse was named after her. She died in Berlin in 2001.

== Awards ==
- 1928: Mendelssohn-State Award
- 1928: Schubert scholarship to Columbia Phonograph Company
- 1978: Merit First Class for Science and the Arts
- 1979: Order of Merit
- 1982: PRS-Medal of Honour for 50-year membership
- 1999: Badge of Honour of the National Music Council, Berlin
- 1999: German Critics' Award (Special)

== Works ==
Grete von Zieritz wrote over 250 works for various ensembles. Selected works include:

=== Orchestral ===
- Kleine Abendmusik for string orchestra (1916)
- Triple Fugue for string orchestra (1926)
- Intermezzo diabolico (1932)
- Bilder vom Jahrmarkt for flute and orchestra (1937)
- Das Gifthorner Konzert for flute, harp, and strings (1940)
- Triple Concerto for flute, clarinet, bassoon, and orchestra (1950)
- Le violon de la mort (Danses macabres) for violin, piano, and orchestra (1956–1957)
- Divertimento for 12 solo instruments and chamber orchestra (1962)
- Sizilianische Rhapsodie for violin and orchestra (1965)
- Concerto for 2 trumpets and orchestra (1975)
- Organ Concerto (1977)
- Fanfare (1979)
- Zigeunerkonzert for violin and orchestra (1982)

=== Chamber ===
- Japanese Songs for soprano and piano (1919)
- Prelude and Fugue in C minor for piano (1924)
- Sonata for viola and piano, Op. 67 (1939)
- Kaleidoskop, Duo for violin and viola, Op. 127 (1969)
- Suite for viola solo, Op. 141 (1976)
- Prelude and Fugue for organ (1977)
- Kassandra-Rufe for eight solo instruments and nonet (1985/86)

=== Vocal ===
==== With orchestra ====
- Passion im Urwald for soprano and orchestra with text by the composer (1930)
- Vogellieder for soprano, flute, and orchestra (1933)
- Hymne for baritone and orchestra on texts by Novalis (1943)
- Die Zigeunerin Agriffina for soprano and orchestra (1956)
- Japanische Lieder for soprano and chamber orchestra (1972)

==== Unaccompanied ====
- Dem Zonnengott for women's chorus on texts by Hölderlin (1940)
- Berglied for mixed chorus (1962)
- 4 Alt-Aztekische Gesänge for mixed chorus (1966)
- 5 Portugiesisch-Spanische Gesänge for mixed chorus (1966)
- 7 Gesänge for mixed chorus on texts of "contemporary black poetry" (1966)
- 3 Chöre for men's chorus on texts by Fontane (1973)
