= Roderich Mojsisovics von Mojsvar =

Austrian composer

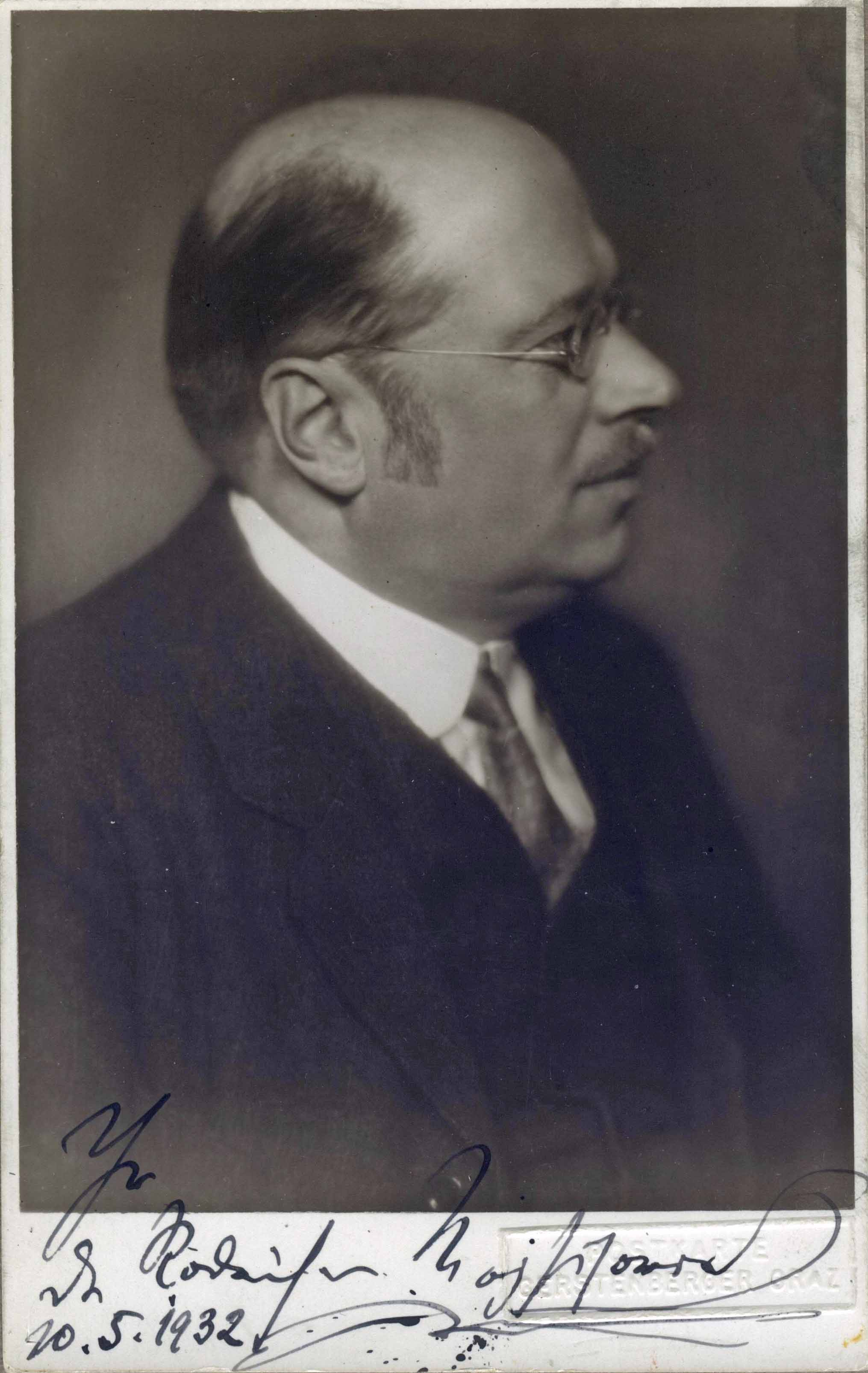
- Born: 10 May 1877; Graz, Austria
- Died: 30 March 1953 (aged 75); Bruck an der Mur, Austria
- Occupation: Composer

Roderich Mojsisovics von Mojsvár (Graz, 10 May 1877 – Bruck an der Mur, 30 March 1953) (also referred to as Roderick Mojsisovics, Roderich Edler von Mojsvár Mojsisovics, Roderich von Mojsisovics-Mojsvár and Roderich Edmund Ladislaus Anton Julius Mojsisovics von Mojsvár) was an Austrian composer based in Graz, head of the Schule des Musikvereins für Steiermark there.

During his leadership, the Schule des Musikvereins für Steiermark was transformed in 1920 into a Conservatory. In 1939 the Conservatory was divided into two parts, now called the Kunst Universität Graz and the Johann-Joseph-Fux Konservatorium Graz.

His works would be termed late Romantic and show the influence of Max Reger. During his lifetime his works failed to gain wide popularity. As a teacher Mojsisiovics had an influence on Otto Siegl, Hans Holenia, Max Schönherr, Alois Pachernegg Waldemar Bloch, Alfons Vodosek and Grete von Zieritz.

== Origin and family ==
His grandfather Georg Mojsisovics chirurg (1799–1861), father was Felix Georg Hermann August Mojsisovics, professor of zoology (1848–1897), Mother Lily Schröer (née Frncisca Maria Julia Schröer; 1855-). His brother was Edgar Mojsisovics (1881–1935) Romanist.

== Selected works ==
- Op. 1 – Fünf Lieder und Gesänge

No. 1 Blütenschwere Kirschbaumzweige
No. 2 Spaziergang
No. 4 Stelldichein

- Op. 2 – Drei Frauenchöre (3 Female Choruses)

No. 1 Nachtgeschwätz
No. 2 Heimliche Gewalt

- Op. 3 – Zwei Skizzen (2 Sketches) for female chorus and string orchestra (1905)

1. Der Seligen Furcht
2. Spätsommer

- Op. 4 – Chorus mysticus (aus Goethes Faust) for soloists, double chorus and orchestra (or organ)
- Op. 5 – Stella, Symphonic Poem for orchestra
- Op. 6 – Vier Lieder und Gesänge (4 Songs)

1. Vorbei
2. Die alte Jungfer
3. Der jungen Hexe Lied
4. Volkslied

- Op. 7 – Fünf gemischte Chöre (5 Mixed Choruses)
- Op. 8 – Eine dramatische Szene
- Op. 9 – Romantische Phantasie for organ (1904)
- Op. 10 – Walzer (Waltzes) for small orchestra (1902–1904)
- Op. 11 – Vier Klavierstücke (4 Piano Pieces)

No. 1 Frühlingsmorgen
No. 2 Bauerntanz
No. 3 Erinnerung

- Op. 12 – Vier Vortragsstücke (4 Recital Pieces) for organ

1. Prologus solemnis
2. Praeludiom G-dur
3. Capriccio Des-dur
4. Kanzone g-moll

- Op. 13a – Zwei Spüche von Peter Rosegger
- Op. 13b – Drei Männerchöre (3 Male Choruses)
- Op. 14 – Kinderliederbuch

No. 1 Wiegenlied im Freien
No. 2 Abendlied
No. 5 Kindergebet
No. 8 Der Rußbuttenbub

- Op. 15 – Symphony No. 1
- Op. 16 – Buntes Allerlei (1906)

No. 1 Kleiner Marsch
No. 7 Kleiner Walzer

- Op. 17 – Lob des Weins
- Op. 18 – Lieder und Gesänge

No. 4 In der Nacht (Ideenjagd)

- Op. 19 – Ninion
- Op. 20 – Die roten Dominos, Opera
- Op. 20b – Die roten Dominos, Suite from the Opera
- Op. 21 – Serenade in einem Satz (Serenade in One Movement) in A major for string trio
- Op. 22 – Zwei Vortragsstücke (2 Recital Pieces) for violin and organ

1. Gebet
2. Pastorale

- Op. 23 –Lieder und Gesänge (Songs)

No. 2 Lied der heiligen Jungfrau
No. 3 Zwei Segel

- Op. 24 – Duett
- Op. 25 – Symphony No. 2
- Op. 26 – Miniaturen
- Op. 27 – Acht kleine Choralvorspiele zum Gebrauch beim evangelischen Gottesdienste (8 Little Chorale Preludes) for organ
- Op. 28 – Astaroth
- Op. 29 – Sonata in D major for violin and piano
- Op. 30 – Claudine von Villa Bella
- Op. 31 – Drei Vortragsstücke (3 Recital Pieces)
- Op. 35 – Tantchen Rosmarin, Opera in 4 Acts
- Op. 36 – Zur Sommerzeit, 6 Instructive Piano Pieces
- Op. 38 – Sonata in B-flat minor for organ
- Op. 40 – Concerto for violin and orchestra
- Op. 41 – Frühlingslieder, 3 Gedichte von Elsa Asenijeff for voice and piano
- Op. 45a – Lieder für das deutsche Haus

Op. 45,a3 Der Mond als Liebespostillon
Op. 45,b Weihnachtskantilene, Cantata for soloists, mixed chorus, string orchestra and organ

- Op. 48 – Nun segne großer Tod!, 3 Kriegslieder von F. M. Weinhandl for voice and piano
- Op. 50 – Messer Ricciardo Minutolo (Wie man Frauen überlistet), Musical Comedy in 4 Acts
- Op. 51 – Waldphantasie for 3 pianos
- Op. 52 – Bilder aus der Steiermark für Klavier

Op. 52b Zwei Klavierstücke zum Konzertvortrag
Op. 52,b/2 Stürmische Nacht

- Op. 54 – Totenfeier, für die Untergegangenen des Deutschen Auslandsgeschwaders for soloist, mixed chorus and orchestra (1914)
- Op. 56 – Träume am Fenster, Song Cycle for high voice and piano or orchestra (published 1925. HMB 1925, page 91)
- Op. 57 – Kammerkonzert (Chamber Concerto) for piano and string orchestra
- Op. 58 – String Quartet No. 2 (premiered 1925, Munich, Berber-Quartett) (NZM Jg 92, 1925, page 169)
- Op. 59 – Merlin, Märchendrama in 3 acts by Eduard Hoffer
- Op. 60 – Der Zauberer, Opera in 1 Act
- Op. 61 – Symphony No. 3 in G♯ minor "Deutschland" (1920–1923)
- Op. 62 – Lustspiel-Ouverture for orchestra
- Op. 66 – Sechs Vortragsstücke (6 Recital Pieces) for organ
- Op. 69b – Zwei Gedichte (2 Poems) for male chorus a cappella
- Op. 70 – Serenade in G major for flute, violin, viola and cello
- Op. 71 – String Quartet No. 3 in C minor
- Op. 72 – Die Locke, Musikalisches Lustspiel in 1 act
- Op. 74 – Sonata in C minor for viola and piano
- Op. 75 – Anno Domini, Opera in 2 Acts
- Op. 80 – Viel Lärm um nichts, Opera in 3 Acts
- Op. 83 No. 4 – Tillenbergersage
- Op. 84 – Norden in Not
- Op. 91 – Nordische Romanze for violin and orchestra
- Op. 94 – Quintet for 2 violins, viola and 2 cellos
- Op. 95 – Lieder nach Gedichten von Rudolf Kundigraber for voice and piano
- Op. 103 – Phantasie for cello and piano or orchestra
- Op. 104 – Bukolischer Tanz for cello and piano

No. 2 Adagio in E♭ major

- Op. 106 – Die graue Frau von Eggenberg, Alpenländisches, pantomimisches Tanzspiel in drei Bildern
- Op. 111 – Vivat Allotria, Orchesterzwischenspiel aus dem 2. Akt für Großes Orch.
- Op. 117 – Ayn Steyrisch Tafelmusicken (mit Verwendung steirischer Volkslieder) for orchestra
- Die chinesischen Mädchen, Opera buffa in 1 act (1928)
- Erinnerung an Einödsbach, 2 Marches for piano
- Fanfare der Stadt Bruck/Mur
- Intrade zu Wilhelm Kienzls 60. Geburtstage
- Julian der Gastfreund, Legende in einem Vorspiel und vier Akten (7 Bildern)
- Kanzonetta von Metastasio "La lieberta a Nice", arrangement for chorus and orchestra
- Madame Blaubart (1920)
- Vorrei morir
- Piano Concerto No. 2 in F minor?

== Writings ==
- Thematischer Leitfaden nebst Einführung in Hans Pfitzners romantische Oper "Die Rose vom Liebesgarten" (Leipzig 1906)
- E.W. Degner (1909)
- Max Reger (1911)
- Ein wiederaufgefundenes Balett Mozarts? in Zeitschrift für Musik Jg. 96 (1929), 472
- Bach-Probleme : Polyphone Klaviermusik (Würzburg, 1930)
- Die Veränderungen der Ausdrucksfähigkeit einer Melodie bei “wandernden” Themen: ein musikdramaturgischer Versuch in Zeitschrift für Musik, Jg.99 (1932), 664–72
- Numerous Articles for the Münchener Neuesten Nachrichten c. 1935–41

== Further reading and external links ==
- Austria Forum: 'Roderich von Mojsisovics-Mojsvár available at : http://www.aeiou.at/aeiou.encyclop.m/m752866.htm
- Haidmayer K.: Roderich von Mojsisovics: Leben und Werk (diss. U. of Graz, 1951) available at https://phaidra.kug.ac.at/detail_object/o:6674?SID=7688&actPage=1&type=listview&sortfield=fgs.createdDate,STRING&sortreverse=0
- Hofer Josef: Spätromatische Orgelmusik steirischer Komponisten (Mag. Art Dipl. KUG Graz, 1984)
- Klassika: Roderich Mojsisovics von Mosjvár
- Levi, E. 'Mojsisovics(-Mojsvár), Roderich Edler von' in New Grove online
- Morold M.: 'Roderich von Mojsisovics' Zeitschrift für Musik Jg. 99 ( 1932) pp. 661–4
- Steinenoth F.: 'Roderich von Mojsisovics' Zeitschrift für Musik Jg. 109 (1942) pp. 202–5

== Selected works (available online) ==
- Free scores by Roderich Mojsisovics von Mojsvar at the International Music Score Library Project (IMSLP)

== Sources for autograph material ==
- Autograph Manuscripts, personal letters. and documents are located in the library of the Johann-Joseph-Fux Konservatorium. Bibliothek der Johann-Joseph-Fux Konservatorium
- Additional letters from Roderich Mojsisovics von Mojsvár are located in the collection of the Leipzig Music publishers C. F. Peters im Staatsarchiv Leipzig.
