= Claudio Arrau =

Chilean and American pianist (1903–1991)

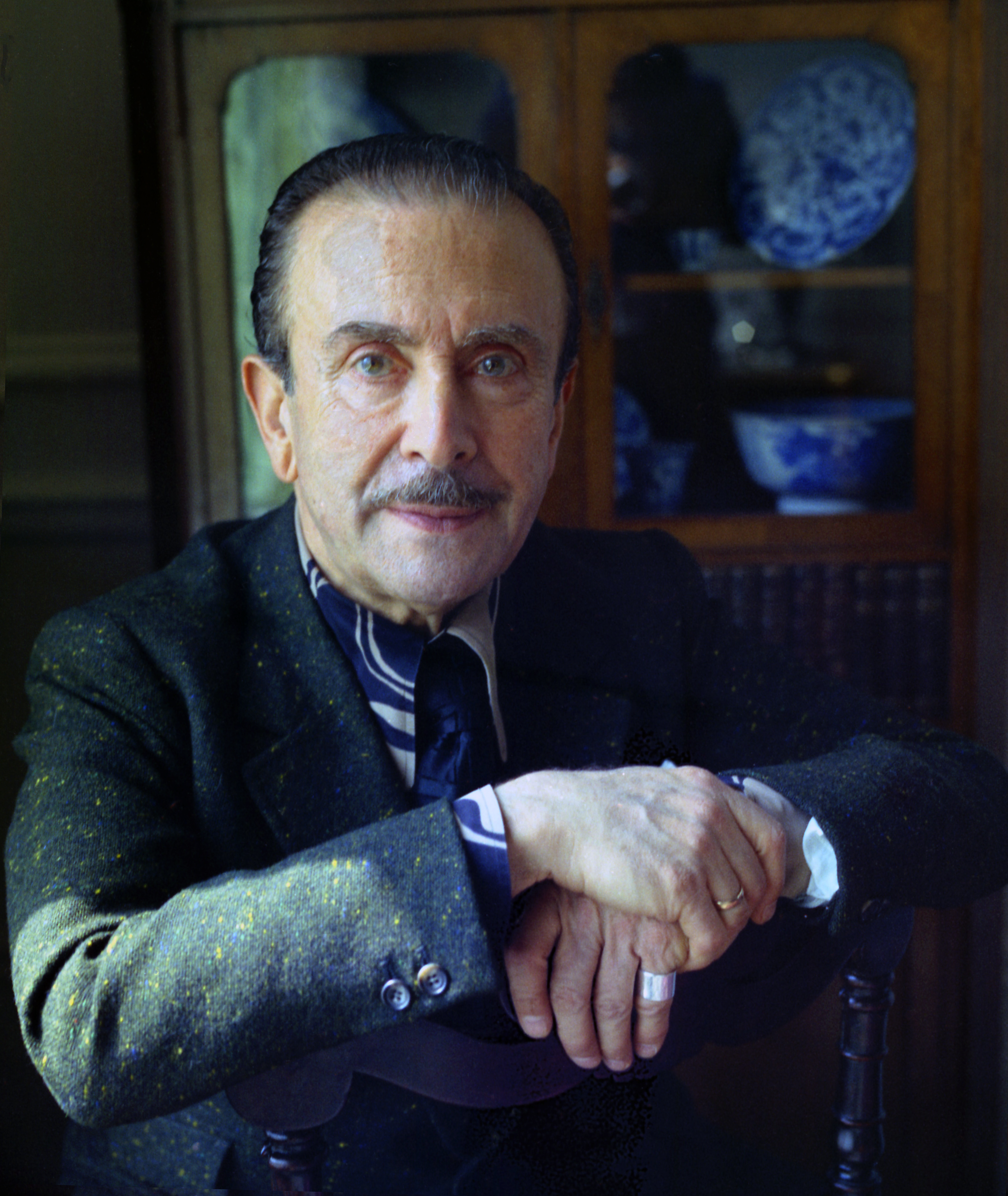
Claudio Arrau in 1974, photographed by Allan Warren

Claudio Arrau León (Spanish: [ˈklawðjo aˈraw]; February 6, 1903 – June 9, 1991) was a Chilean and American pianist known for his interpretations of a vast repertoire spanning the baroque to 20th-century composers, especially Bach, Mozart, Beethoven, Schubert, Chopin, Schumann, Liszt, and Brahms. He is widely considered one of the greatest pianists of the twentieth century.

== Life ==
Arrau was born in Chillán, Chile, to Carlos Arrau, an ophthalmologist who died when Claudio was only one year old, and Lucrecia León Bravo de Villalba, a piano teacher. He belonged to an old, prominent family of Southern Chile. His ancestor Lorenzo de Arrau was a Spanish engineer who was sent to Chile by King Carlos III of Spain. Through his great-grandmother, María del Carmen Daroch del Solar, Arrau was a descendant of the Campbells of Glenorchy, a Scottish noble family. Arrau was raised as a Catholic, but gave it up in his late teens.

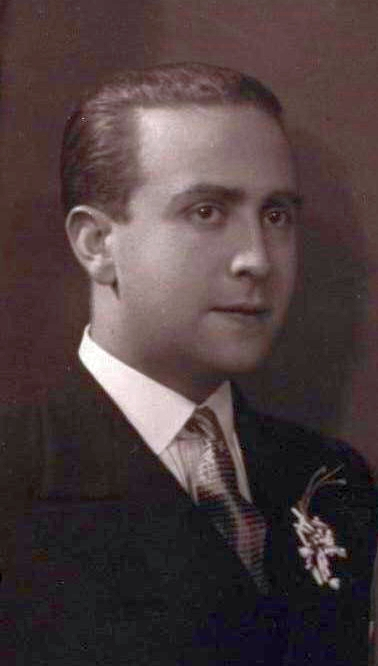
Claudio Arrau, November 1929

Arrau was a child prodigy and he could read music before he could read words, but unlike many virtuosos, there had never been a professional musician in his family. His mother was an amateur pianist and introduced him to the instrument. At the age of four, he was reading Beethoven sonatas, and he gave his first concert a year later. When Arrau was six, he auditioned in front of several congressmen and President Pedro Montt, who was so impressed that he began arrangements for Arrau's future education. At eight years old, Arrau was sent on a ten-year-long grant from the Chilean government to study in Germany, travelling with his mother and sister Lucrecia. He was admitted to the Stern Conservatory of Berlin where he eventually became a pupil of Martin Krause, who had studied under Franz Liszt. At the age of eleven, Arrau could play Liszt's Transcendental Etudes, one of the most difficult works for piano, as well as Brahms's Paganini Variations. Arrau's first recordings were made on Aeolian Duo-Art player piano music rolls. Krause died in his fifth year of teaching Arrau, leaving the 15-year-old student devastated by the loss of his mentor; Arrau did not continue formal study after that point.

In 1935, Arrau gave a celebrated rendition of the entire keyboard works of Johann Sebastian Bach over 12 recitals. In 1936, Arrau gave a complete Mozart keyboard works over 5 recitals, and followed with the complete Schubert and Weber cycles. In 1938, for the first time, Arrau gave the complete Beethoven piano sonatas and concertos in Mexico City. Arrau repeated this several times in his lifetime, including in New York and London. He became one of the leading authorities on Beethoven in the 20th century.

In 1937, Arrau married mezzo-soprano Ruth Schneider, a German national. They had three children: Carmen (1938–2006), Mario (1940–1988) – who fathered three sons: Shawn (1968), Paycer (1969), and Kip (1970) – and Christopher (1959). In 1941 the Arrau family emigrated from Germany to the United States, eventually settling in Douglaston, Queens, New York, where Arrau spent his remaining years. He became a dual US–Chilean citizen in 1979. On August 17, 1982, the first CD of classical music in history was released by the PolyGram record company; its content consisted of waltzes by Chopin performed by Claudio Arrau.

Arrau died on June 9, 1991, at the age of 88, in Mürzzuschlag, Austria, from complications of emergency surgery performed on June 8 to correct an intestinal blockage. His remains were interred in his native city of Chillán, Chile.

== Tone and approach to music ==
Arrau was an intellectual and a deeply reflective interpreter. He read widely while travelling, and he learned English, Italian, German, and French in addition to his native Spanish. He became familiar with Jung's psychology in his twenties.

Arrau's attitude toward music was very serious. He preached fidelity to the score, but also the use of imagination. Although he often played with slower and more deliberate tempi from his middle age onward, he had a reputation as a fabulous virtuoso earlier in his career, a reputation supported by recordings he made at this time, such as Balakirev's Islamey and Liszt's Paganini études. However, even late in his career, he often tended to play with less restraint in live concerts than in studio recordings.

Arrau's work continued and even towards the end of his life he invariably programmed large, demanding concerts, including works such as Beethoven's Emperor Concerto and Brahms' Piano Concerto No. 1.

== Contributions ==
Arrau was a frequent recital performer: from age 40 to 60 he averaged 120 concerts a season, with a very large repertoire. At one time or another, he performed the complete keyboard works of Bach, Mozart, Beethoven and Chopin, but also programmed such off-the-beaten-path composers as Alkan and Busoni and illuminated obscure corners of the Liszt repertoire. It has been estimated that Arrau's total repertoire would carry him through 76 recital evenings, not counting the 60-odd works with orchestra which he also knew.

Arrau recorded a considerable part of the piano music of Schumann, Chopin and Liszt. He edited the complete Beethoven piano sonatas for the Peters Urtext edition and recorded all of them on the Philips label in 1962–1966. He recorded almost all of them once again in 1984–1990 along with Mozart's complete piano sonatas. He is also famous for his recordings of Schubert, Brahms and Debussy. At the time of his death at age 88 in the midst of a European concert tour, Arrau was working on a recording of the complete works of Bach for keyboard, and was also preparing some pieces of Haydn, Mendelssohn, Reger and Busoni, and Boulez's third piano sonata.

Numerous pianists studied with Arrau, including Karlrobert Kreiten, Garrick Ohlsson, Roberto Szidon, Stephen Drury, Roberto Eyzaguirre, Edith Fischer, David Lively, Paul Kiss, Rafael de Silva, Arturo Nicolayevsky, among others.

On March 26, 2021, Pristine Classical released what it called "a sonic overhaul" of Arrau's "stunningly brilliant" 1942 RCA studio recording of Bach's Goldberg Variations, remastered from an issue in 1988, which had "sat in the vaults [of RCA] for 46 years."

== Critics ==
- Olin Downes, reviewing a recital of Mozart, Schumann, Ravel and Debussy works in The New York Times, described Claudio Arrau as "a pianist of most exceptional equipment, imagination and unfailing taste."
- In 1963, according to various critics, he was a man with "no equal at the present time in point of technical stature and depth of musical imagination," "the No. 1 pianist of our time," a "pianistic titan," a "lion of the piano," or, if you like, a "neo-Liszt from the Tropic of Capricorn".
- Daniel Barenboim said that Claudio Arrau had a particular sound with two aspects: first a thickness, full-bodied and orchestral, and second an utterly disembodied timbre, quite spellbinding.
- Joachim Kaiser: "Arrau is the noblest, the most conscientious, most respectable pianist of our time."
- Sir Colin Davis said: "His sound is amazing, and it is entirely his own... no one else has it exactly that way. His devotion to Liszt is extraordinary. He ennobles that music in a way no one else in the world can."
- According to American critic Harold C. Schonberg, Arrau always put "a decidedly romantic piano tone in his interpretations".
- Karl Schumann, Germany's leading music critic, said in the Süddeutsche Zeitung on June 2, 1986: "Is it not Claudio Arrau who is the most musical and deeply serious piano phenomenon of our time?".
- According to Joseph Horowitz: "His earliest recordings, extending into the forties, are his most mercurial, and are buffed with the glistening tonal refinements mentioned in his early New York reviews. His recorded performances of the following decade or so are more majestically placed; given room to maneuver, he is more likely to linger than to bolt. (...) Then, sometimes around 1960, the recordings document a different change. An emerging undercurrent of raw feeling not only dictates yet slower tempos and grander rubatos, but adds to the dignified architecture of Arrau's sound a steady projection of human frailty. (...) How did this change come about? (...) At the risk of resorting to cut-rate psychology, I am tempted to cite, as well, the event Arrau recalls as 'the greatest shock in my life': his mother's death in 1959. Perhaps mourning opened new emotional pathways. Perhaps the disappearance of a pervasive authority figure freed or emboldened him to make a more vulnerable statement in his art."
- John von Rhein wrote in 1991 in the Chicago Tribune: "He was among the least flamboyant of pianists, avoiding virtuosic display as rigorously as some pianists seek it out; yet there was never any doubt of his virtuoso technique. He commanded a rich sonority, each chord superbly weighted, the fingerwork a model of finely chiseled clarity, the shape of each phrase deeply considered. Sometimes Mr. Arrau's penchant for slow tempos and emphasis on inner detail could seem fussy, depriving his performances of spontaneity and momentum. At his considerable best, however, he was among the most deeply satisfying interpreters of Mozart, Brahms, Schumann, Liszt, Chopin and particularly Beethoven, whose works held a position in his repertoire comparable to that of his great colleague, pianist Rudolf Serkin.

== Honours ==
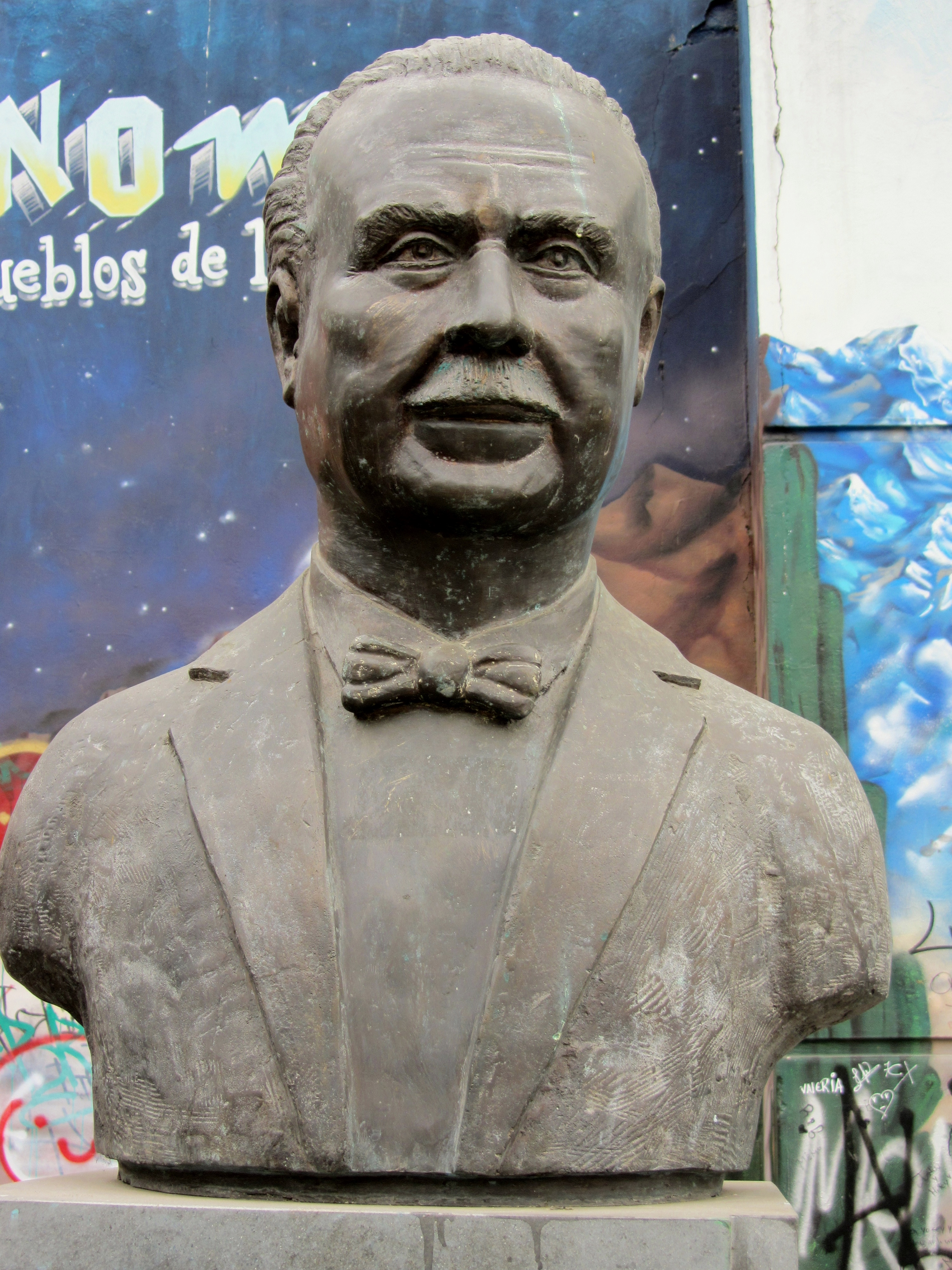
Bust of Arrau in the Chilean commune of Quinta Normal, located in Santiago de Chile

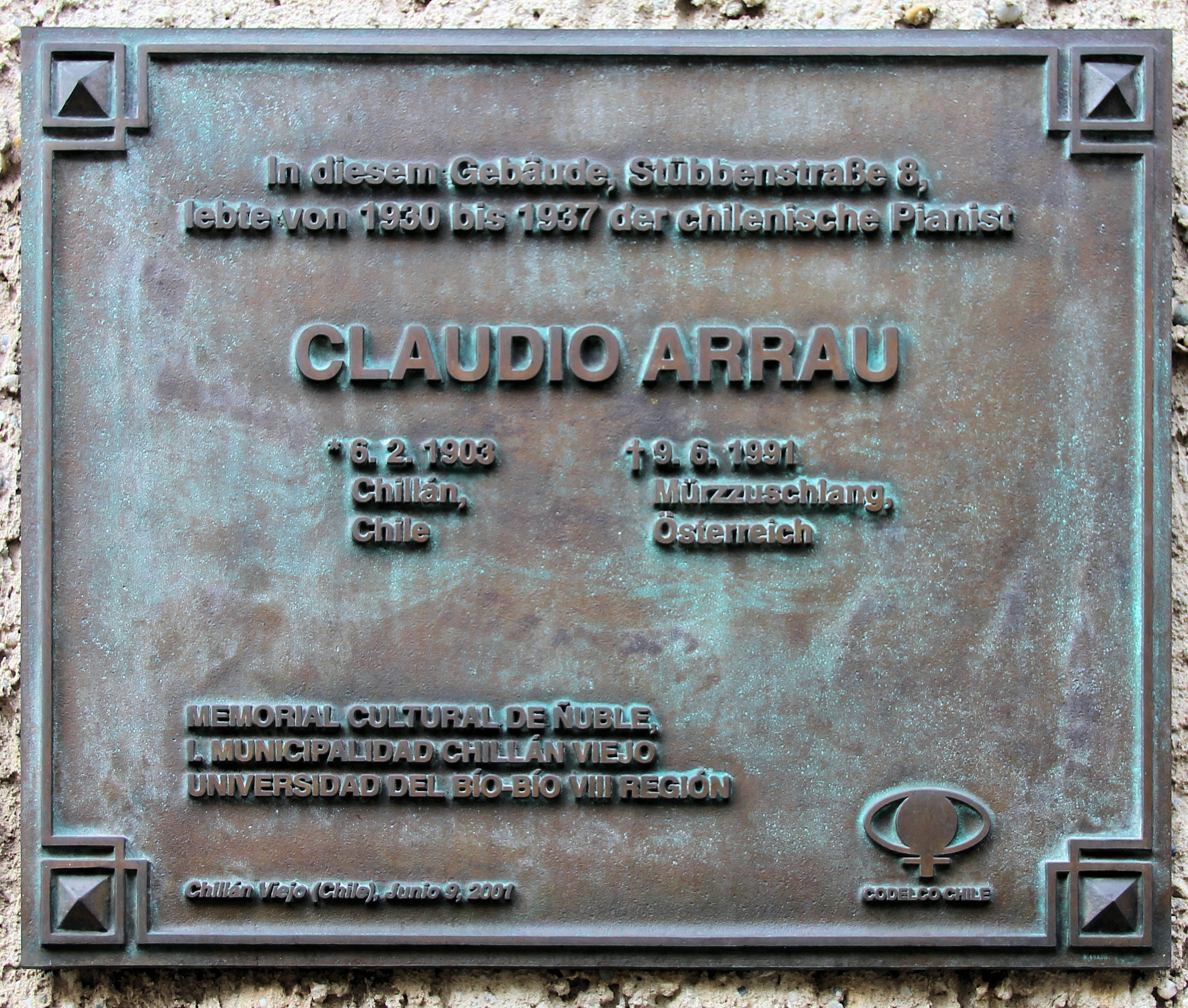
Arrau commemorative plaque in the German district of Tempelhof-Schöneberg, in Berlin.

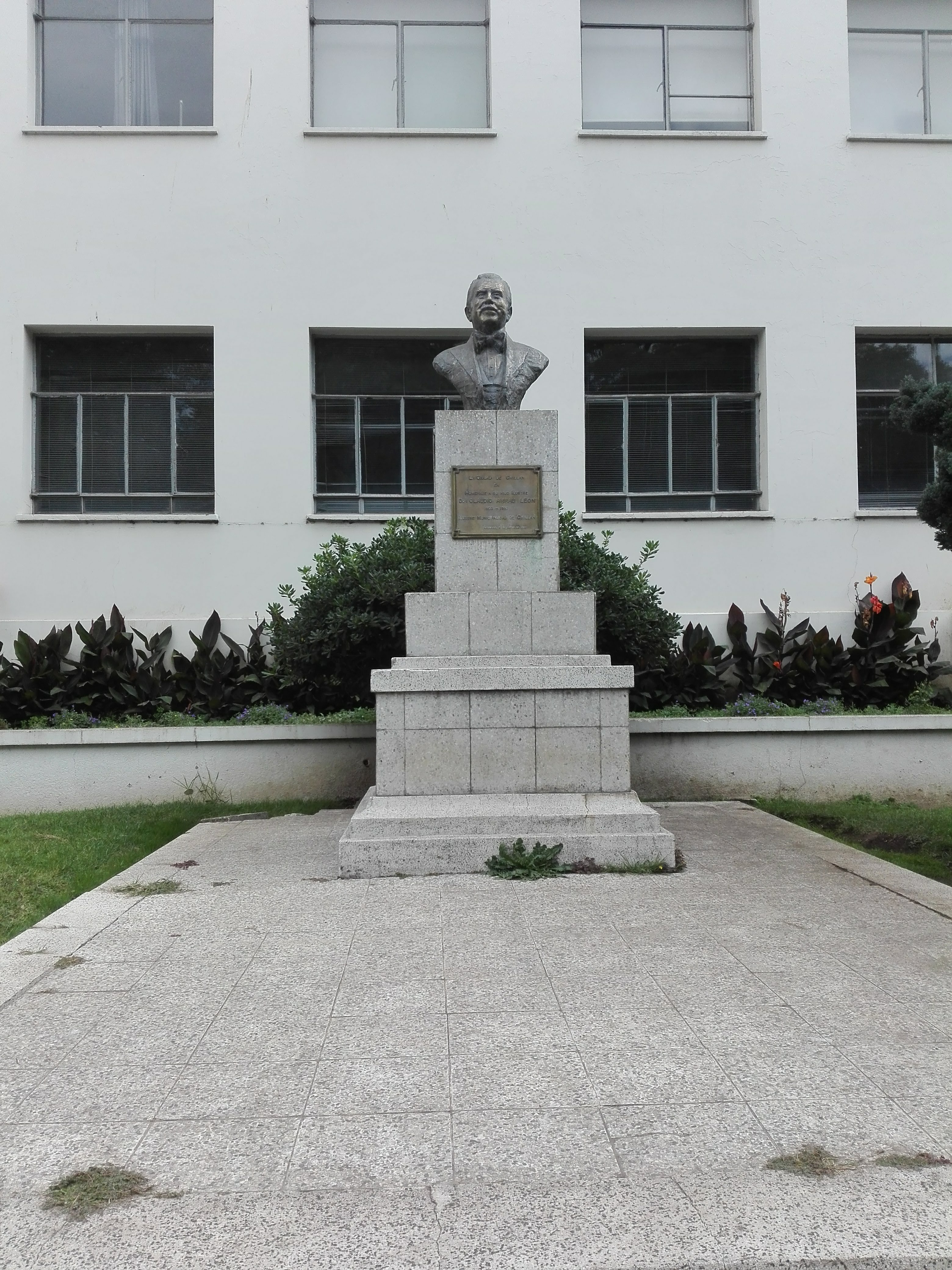
Bust of Arrau in his hometown Chillán

List of awards, recognitions and medals awarded to Claudio Arrau.

- 1915–1918:
- 1915: Prize Rudolph Ibach

- Gustav Holländer Medal
- Sachsen-Gothaische Medal

- 1918: Stern Conservatory's Exceptional Honours Diploma in Piano
- 1919–1920: Liszt Prize in Germany
- 1924: Permanent Active Member of the Bach Society in Santiago de Chile)
- 1927: Grand Prix of the Concours International des Pianistes (International Pianist Competition) from Geneva, Suiza. The jury was composed by Arthur Rubinstein, Joseph Pembauer, Ernest Schelling, Alfred Cortot and José Vianna da Motta.
- 1941: Illustrious Son of Chillán
- 1944: Gold Medal in Appreciation from the Chilean government
- 1949: Favorite Son of Mexico
- 1949: Honorary degree from the University of Chile
- 1954: Honorary Member of the University of Chile's Faculty of Music
- 1954: Illustrious Son of Santiago
- 1958: Royal Philharmonic Society medal
- 1959: Honorary Citizen from Santiago
- 1959: Worthy Son of Chillán
- 1959: Gold Medal and Honorary Citizen of Concepción
- 1959: Honorary Member of the University of Concepción
- 1965: Knight of the Order of Arts and Letters in France
- 1970: Order of Merit of the Federal Republic of Germany
- 1973: Citation by United Jewish Appeal for support and contribution in solidarity with the Jewish people
- 1980: Hans von Bülow Medal by Berlin Philharmonic, Germany
- 1982: Doctor of Humane Letters by University of Vermont, United States
- 1983: La Orden del Águila Azteca (The Order of the Aztec Eagle) in Mexico
- 1983: Honorary Member of the Pan American Society
- 1983: The Philadelphia's bowl, United States
- 1983: First Honorary Member of the Düsseldorf, Germany Robert Schumann Society
- 1983: Commander of the Legion of Honor in France
- 1983: The International Music Award by UNESCO
- 1983: Commander of the National Academy of Santa Cecilia
- 1983: Beethoven's medal in New York City
- 1983: Honorary degree from the University of Oxford, England
- 1983: National Prize of Musical Arts of Chile
- 1984: Honorary degree from the University of Concepción
- 1984: Honorary degree from the University of Biobío
- 1984: Honorary Member from Academy of Fine Arts of Chile
- 1984: Highest Distinction Award from the Inter-American Music Council and the Organization of American States
- 1986: Freedom Award from the Mayor of the New York City
- 1988: The Teresa Carreño Medal in Venezuela
- 1988: Honorary Member of the Royal Philharmonic Society of London
- 1990: Gold Medal from the Royal Philharmonic Society of London (posthumously delivered to his daughter Carmen)
- 1991: Unfinished Arrau performance with his Robert Schumann Medal at a recital scheduled for June 1991 in Düsseldorf, Germany.
- 1991: The Robert Schumann Society established the Arrau Medal in 1991. The medal is awarded to a pianist who is especially committed to the spirit and tradition of Claudio Arrau's keyboard art. Examples include András Schiff, Martha Argerich and Murray Perahia.
- 1991: Cultural Medal known as Citizen of the World, awarded by the Palacio de la Moneda de Chile.
- 2012: Entry into the Gramophone Hall of Fame

== Partial discography ==
- Beethoven, Conc. pf. n. 4, 5 – Arrau/Haitink/CGO, 1964 Philips
- Beethoven, Piano Concertos Nos. 4 & 5 – Claudio Arrau/Sir Colin Davis/Staatskapelle Dresden, Philips
- Beethoven, The 5 Piano Concertos – Claudio Arrau/Sir Colin Davis/Staatskapelle Dresden, 1988 Philips
- Beethoven, Sonatas. pf. n. 1–32 – Arrau, 1964 Decca
- Beethoven, Sonatas. pf. n. 8, 14, 23 – Arrau, 1962/1967 Decca
- Beethoven: The Late Piano Sonatas, Op. 101, 106, 109, 110, & 111 – Claudio Arrau, Philips
- Beethoven: Complete Piano Sonatas – Claudio Arrau, Decca
- Chopin, Ballate n. 1-4/Scherzi n. 1–4 – Arrau, 1977/1984 Decca
- Chopin, Claudio Arrau Plays Chopin – Arrau/Inbal/LPO, Decca
- Chopin, Conc. pf. n. 1-2/Krakowiak – Arrau/Inbal/LPO, 1970/1980 Philips
- Chopin, Nocturnes n. 1–21 – Arrau, 1978/1980 Philips
- Chopin, Valzer n. 1–19 – Arrau, 1980 Decca
- Chopin, 26 Preludes & 4 Impromptus – Claudio Arrau, Philips
- Chopin: Études Op. 10 and Op. 25 – Claudio Arrau, 1957 EMI Great Recordings of the Century
- Debussy: Preludes & Images & Estampes – Claudio Arrau, 1991 Philips
- Liszt, 12 Etudes d'exécution transcendante – Claudio Arrau, 1977 Philips
- Liszt: Sonata in B Minor, 2 Études de concert – Claudio Arrau, Philips
- Mozart, Son. pf. n. 1-18/Fant./Rondò – Arrau, 1973/1987 Decca
- Schubert: Late Piano Sonatas – Claudio Arrau, Decca
- Schumann: Carnaval; Kinderszenen; Waldszenen – Claudio Arrau, 1987 Philips
- Arrau, Beethoven/Chopin/Liszt – Davis/LSO, 1976/1985 Decca
- Arrau, The legacy – Bach/Beethoven/Schubert/Debussy, 1988/1991 Decca

== Filmography ==
Year	Title	Role
1935	Sueño de amor	Franz Liszt
1935	Thy Son	
1957	Claudio Arrau Concert	
1976	Memories of Berlin: The Twilight of Weimar Culture	
1978	Claudio Arrau: A Life in Music	
1987	Claudio Arrau: The Emperor	
1993	The Golden Age of the Piano	
1999	The Art of Piano: Great Pianists of the 20th Century	

== Books ==
- 1984: Leben mit der Musik (with Joseph Horowitz) ISBN 978-3-596-30573-5
- 1985: Arrau parle: conversations avec Joseph Horowitz (with Joseph Horowitz) ISBN 978-2-07-070522-1
- 2009: Liszt: A Listener's Guide to His Piano Works (with John Bell Young) ISBN 978-1-57467-170-4
