= René Amengual =

Chilean composer

René Amengual Astaburuaga
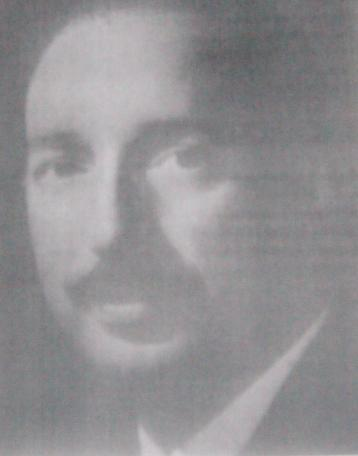
- A faded photograph of René in his adulthood
- Born: September 2, 1911; Santiago, Chile
- Died: August 2, 1954 (aged 42)
- Occupation: Composer/Pianist
- Notable work: Sextet

René Amengual Astaburuaga (1911–1954) was a Chilean composer, educator and pianist. He is the author of the University of Chile hymn.

== Notoriety ==
In 1953 his work Sextet was selected for the Festival of Contemporary Music ISCM held in Oslo, Norway.
