= Murray Perahia =

American pianist and conductor (born 1947)

Murray Perahia KBE
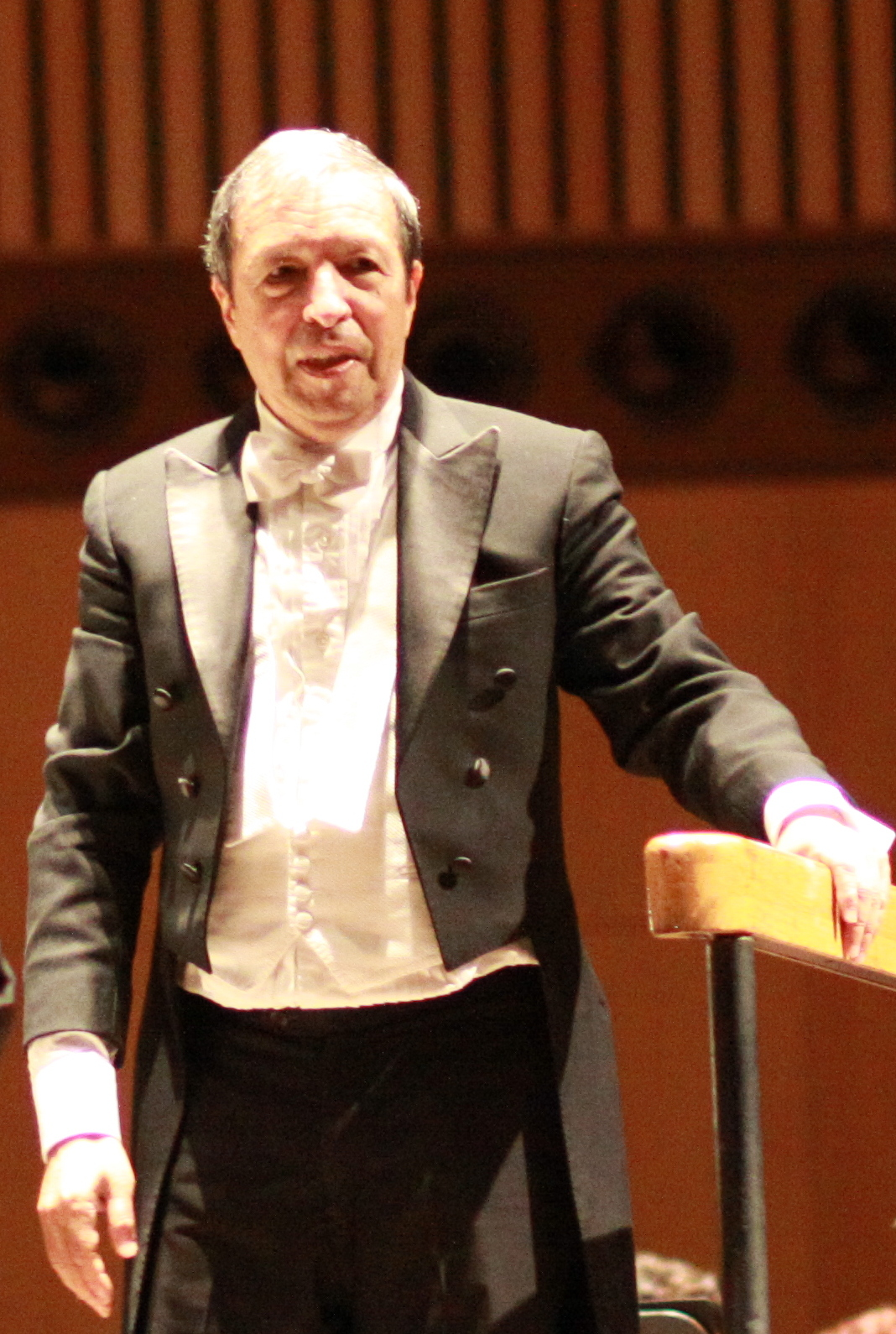
- Perahia in 2012
- Born: April 19, 1947 (age 79); New York City, U.S.
- Education: Mannes College
- Occupations: Pianist, conductor
- Spouse: Ninette Shohet
- Children: 2
- Awards: See Awards
- Musical career
- Instrument: Piano
- Labels: Sony Classical, Deutsche Grammophon

Murray David Perahia KBE (/pəˈraɪ.ə/ pə-RY-ə; born April 19, 1947) is an American pianist and conductor. He has been considered one of the greatest living pianists. He was the first North American pianist to win the Leeds International Piano Competition, in 1972.

Known as a leading interpreter of Bach, Handel, Scarlatti, Mozart, Beethoven, and Schumann, among other composers, Perahia has won numerous awards, including three Grammy Awards from a total of 18 nominations, and 9 Gramophone Awards in addition to its first and only "Piano Award".

== Early life ==
Murray (Moshe) was born in the Bronx borough of New York City to a family of Sephardi Jewish origin. His first language was Judaeo-Spanish, or Ladino. The family came from Thessaloniki, Greece. His father moved to the United States in 1935.

Perahia began studying the piano at age four, with a teacher, he said, who was "very limiting" because she made him play a single piece until it was perfect. He said his musical interests blossomed at age 15 for reasons he can't explain, and he began to practice seriously. At age 17, Perahia attended Mannes College, where he studied keyboard, conducting, and composition with his teacher and mentor Mieczysław Horszowski. During the summer, he also attended the Marlboro Music School and Festival, where he studied with musicians Rudolf Serkin, Alexander Schneider, and Pablo Casals, among others. He played duets for piano four hands with Serkin, who later made Perahia his assistant at the Curtis Institute in Philadelphia, a position he held for over a year.

In 1965, Perahia won the Young Concert Artists International Auditions. In 1971, he won a grant from the Ford Foundation to commission a new work from a composer of his choice. In 1972, he was the first North American to win first prize at the Leeds Piano Competition, helping to cement its reputation for advancing the careers of young pianists.

== Career ==
In 1973, Perahia worked with Benjamin Britten and Peter Pears at the Aldeburgh Festival, and with fellow pianist Radu Lupu. He was co-artistic director of the Festival from 1981 to 1989.

In the 1980s, Perahia was invited to work with Vladimir Horowitz, an admirer of his art. Perahia says this had a defining influence on his pianism. He became close to Horowitz, whom he visited during the elder pianist's last four years to play for him.

From 1973 to 2010, Perahia recorded exclusively for Columbia Masterworks, now Sony Classical. His first major recording project was Mozart's 27 piano concertos, conducted from the keyboard with the English Chamber Orchestra. In the 1980s, he also recorded Beethoven's five piano concertos, with Bernard Haitink and the Royal Concertgebouw Orchestra.

=== Hand injuries ===
In 1990, Perahia suffered a cut to his right thumb, which became septic. He took antibiotics for this condition, but they affected his health. In 1992, his career was threatened by a bone abnormality in his hand causing inflammation, requiring several years away from the keyboard and a series of operations. During that time, he says, he found solace through studying the music of J.S. Bach. After recovering, he produced a series of award-winning recordings of Bach's keyboard works in the late 1990s, including a notable rendition of the Goldberg Variations.

In early 2005, Perahia's hand problem recurred, prompting him to withdraw from the concert stage on the advice of his doctors. He cancelled several appearances at the Barbican Centre, as well as a ten-city national tour of the United States but returned with recitals in German cities in 2006 and at the Barbican in April 2007.

In the autumn of 2007, he completed a ten-city tour of the United States. Owing to his hand problem, and on the advice of his doctor, Perahia cancelled a February 2008 solo recital at the Barbican Centre and a tour in the United States with the Academy of St Martin in the Fields (March and April 2008). He returned to the platform in August 2008, touring with the Royal Concertgebouw Orchestra under the direction of Bernard Haitink, and had an Asian recital tour in October and November.

=== Recent activities ===
Perahia has recorded Chopin's études, and Schubert's late piano sonatas. He is currently editing a new Henle Verlag Urtext edition of Beethoven's 32 piano sonatas, to be finished in 2027. Besides his solo career, Perahia is active in chamber music and appears regularly with the Guarneri and Budapest String Quartets. He is also Principal Guest Conductor of the Academy of St Martin in the Fields, with which he records and performs.

In January 2009, Murray Perahia was appointed president of the Jerusalem Music Center established by violinist Isaac Stern. In an interview with Haaretz newspaper, he said: "Music represents an ideal world where all dissonances resolve, where all modulations — that are journeys — return home, and where surprise and stability coexist."

Perahia appeared at Sir Neville Marriner's 90th birthday concert on April 1, 2014, playing Mozart's Piano Concerto No. 20 with the Academy of St Martin in the Fields conducted by Marriner.

In 2016, Perahia signed with Deutsche Grammophon. His first release for the label, Bach's French Suites, came out in October 2016.

On April 16, 2024, at Wigmore Hall, after a six-year health hiatus, Perahia returned to performing.

== Teaching ==
Upon graduation from Mannes, Perahia was appointed to the faculty and taught there from 1969 to 1979. Perahia was invited to teach at the International Piano Foundation Theo Lieven (known today as the International Piano Academy Lake Como) to selected students. He has given masterclasses at such institutions as Juilliard School, Stanford University, and Peabody Institute, among many others. Each year, he holds a summer course at the Jerusalem Music Centre to young Israeli pianists, aged 12 to 18. He continues to give frequent masterclasses as president of the JMC. In 2022, Perahia held a series of masterclasses in Munich on Beethoven's piano sonatas, hosted by the publisher G. Henle Verlag, with ten young professional pianists he chose himself: Elia Cecino (Italy), Yan Francis Fang (China), Pieter Gunawan (Indonesia), Hyunji Kim (South Korea), Michael Lu (USA), Eden Agranat Meged (Israel), Misora Ozaki (Japan), Maksym Shadko (Ukraine), Clara Isabella Siegle (Germany) and Parker Van Ostrand (USA).

== Personal life ==
Perahia lives in London with his wife, Ninette Shohet, who is of Iraqi-Jewish heritage. He has two adult sons, Benjamin and Raphael.

Perahia is a cousin of the late guitarist Joshua Perahia (1952–2024), best known for his work in the Christian metal band Joshua.

== Awards ==
Leeds International Piano Competition

- 1972 Leeds International Piano Competition First Prize

Seventh International Schumann Festival

- 2000 Robert Schumann Society Claudio Arrau Memorial Medal

Grammy Award for Best Chamber Music Performance

- 1989 Bartók: Sonata for Two Pianos & Percussion

Grammy Award for Best Instrumental Soloist Performance

- 2003 Chopin: Études, Opp. 10, 25
- 1999 Bach: English Suites Nos. 1, 3 and 6

Gramophone Award

- Gramophone Award for best concerto recording, 1984, Piano Concertos Nos. 15 and 16 by Wolfgang Amadeus Mozart
- Gramophone Award for best concerto recording, 1986, Piano Concertos Nos. 3 and 4 by Ludwig van Beethoven
- Gramophone Award for best instrumental recording, 1986, works by Franz Schubert and Wolfgang Amadeus Mozart with Radu Lupu
- Gramophone Award for best instrumental recording, 1995, works by Frédéric Chopin
- Gramophone Award for best instrumental recording, 1996, works by George Frideric Handel and Domenico Scarlatti
- Gramophone Award for best instrumental recording, 2001, Goldberg Variations by J.S.Bach
- Gramophone Award for best instrumental recording, 2003, Études by Frédéric Chopin
- Gramophone Award for best instrumental recording, 2011, piano music of Johannes Brahms
- Gramophone Award for best instrumental recording, 2016, Six French Suites by J.S. Bach

Perahia is an Honorary Fellow of the Royal College of Music and Honorary Member of the Royal Academy of Music (1985). In 2007, he was elected to an Honorary Fellowship of Jesus College, Cambridge.

On March 8, 2004, Queen Elizabeth II made him an honorary Knight Commander of the Order of the British Empire. (This entitles him to use the post-nominal letters KBE, but not to the title "Sir".)

In 2012 he was voted into the inaugural Gramophone Hall of Fame.

In 2012 he was awarded the Jean Gimbel Lane Prize in Piano Performance from Northwestern University.

In 2013 he was awarded the Royal Academy of Music Bach Prize

In 2015 he was awarded the Wolf Prize in Arts (with Jessye Norman).

A species of solitary bee from Israel was named in his honour in 2016.

In 2024 he received an honorary doctorate from the University of Cambridge.

== Discography ==
=== 1970s ===
- Schumann: Davidsbündlertänze, Op. 6; Fantasiestücke, Op. 12 (1973)
- Chopin: The Chopin Preludes. (1975)
- Schumann: Études Symphoniques op. 13 & Études Posthumes; Papillons (1977)

=== 1980s ===
- Mozart: Piano Concerto No. 26, k. 537 "Coronation" and Rondos, K.382 & 386 (1984)
- Schubert: Wanderer Fantasy, Op. 15; Schumann: Fantasy in C major, Op. 17 (1986)
- Mozart, Beethoven: Quintets for piano and winds (1986)
- Mozart: Sonata (K. 448); Schubert: Piano Sonata for four hands (1986; with Radu Lupu)
- Beethoven: Piano Concertos Nos. 3 and 4 (1986)
- Brahms: Piano Quartet (1987)
- Beethoven: Piano Sonatas Nos. 17, 18 and 26 (1987)
- Beethoven: Piano Concerto No. 5 (Emperor) (1987)
- A Portrait of Murray Perahia (1987)
- Mendelssohn: Piano Concertos Nos. 1 and 2 (CD 1987, but recorded in 1974 and originally issued on LP) — with Neville Marriner and the Academy of St. Martin in the Fields
- Mozart: Piano Concertos Nos. 11, 12 and 14 (1987)
- Mozart: Piano Concertos Nos. 22 and 24 (1987)
- Chopin: Piano Concerto No. 1, Barcarolle, etc. (1987)
- Beethoven: Piano Concertos Nos. 1 and 2 (1987)
- Mozart: Piano Concertos Nos. 9 and 21 (1987)
- Schumann: Symphonic Études, posthumous études, Papillons; Chopin: Piano Sonatas Nos. 2 and 3 (1988)
- Schumann: Davidsbündlertänze; Fantasiestücke (1988)
- Beethoven: The five piano concertos (1988) — with Bernard Haitink and the Royal Concertgebouw Orchestra
- Schumann: Piano Sonata, Op. 22; Schubert: Piano Sonata, D. 959 (1988)
- Bartók: Sonata for 2 Pianos and Percussion; Brahms: Variations on a Theme by Haydn (1988)
- Schumann, Grieg: Piano concertos (1989)

=== 1990s ===
- Schubert: Impromptus (1990)
- Chopin: Piano Concertos Nos. 1 and 2 (1990)
- Murray Perahia in Performance (1991)
- Murray Perahia Plays Franck and Liszt (1991)
- Brahms: Sonata No. 3, Rhapsodies, etc. (1991)
- Mozart: Concertos for 2 and 3 pianos, Andante and Variations for piano four hands (1991) with Radu Lupu
- Mozart: Piano Concertos Nos. 21 and 27 (1991)
- The Aldeburgh Recital (1991)
- Mozart: Piano Sonatas (K. 310, 333, and 533) (1992)
- Bach: Harpsichord Concertos (1993)
- Immortal Beloved Original Motion Picture Soundtrack (1994)
- Greatest Hits: Grieg (1994)
- Chopin 4 Ballades: Waltzes Op 18&42, Nocturne Op 15, Mazurkas Op 7,17&33, Études Op 10 Sony Classical #SK 64 399 (1994)
- Beethoven: Piano Sonatas (Op. 2, Nos. 1–3) (1995)
- Murray Perahia: 25th Anniversary Edition (1997)
- Schumann: Kreisleriana, Piano Sonata No. 1 (1997)
- Schumann: Complete works for piano and orchestra (1997) — with Claudio Abbado and the Berlin Philharmonic Orchestra
- Murray Perahia Plays Handel and Scarlatti (1997)
- Bach: English Suites Nos. 1, 3 and 6 (1998), Sony Classical
- Songs Without Words: Bach/Busoni, Mendelssohn and Schubert–Liszt (1999)
- Mozart: Piano Concertos Nos. 20 and 27 (1999)
- Glenn Gould at the Movies (1999)
- Bach: English Suites Nos. 2, 4 and 5 (1999), Sony Classical

=== From 2000 ===
- Bach: Goldberg Variations (2000), Sony Classical
- Chopin: Études (2001)
- Bach: Keyboard Concertos Nos. 1, 2 and 4 (2001), Sony Classical
- Bach: Keyboard Concertos Nos. 3, 5, 6, 7 (2002)
- Schubert: Late Piano Sonatas (2003)
- Murray Perahia Plays Bach (2003)
- Beethoven: String Quartet, Op. 127; Piano Sonata, Op. 101 (2004) (The string quartet is transcribed for full string orchestra and conducted by Murray Perahia)
- Bach: Partitas Nos. 2, 3, 4 (2008), Sony Classical
- Bach: English Suites Nos. 1-6, BWV 806-811 (2008), Sony Classical
- Beethoven: Piano Sonatas Op. 14, Nos. 1 and 2, Op. 26, Op. 28 (Pastorale) (2008), Sony Classical
- Bach: Partitas Nos. 1, 5, 6 (2009), Sony Classical
- Mozart: Piano Concertos Nos. 17 & 18 (2009), Sony Classical
- Brahms: Handel Variations; Two Rhapsodies, Op. 79; Six Piano Pieces, Op. 118; Four Piano Pieces, Op. 119 (2010)
- Schumann: Piano Concerto in A Minor, Op. 54 - Grieg: Piano Concerto in A Minor, Op. 16 (2010), Sony Classical
- Mozart: Piano Concertos Nos. 21, 23 & Rondos (2010), Sony Classical
- Bach: French Suite No 5 (2011)
- Beethoven: Piano Sonata No 27 Op 90 (2011)
- Chopin: Mazurka C-Sharp Minor Op 30 No 4 (2011)
- Bach: The French Suites (2016), Deutsche Grammophon
- Beethoven: Piano Sonatas op. 106 "Hammerklavier" & Op. 27/2 "Moonlight" (2018), Deutsche Grammophon

== Videography ==
- Murray Perahia in Performance (1992)
- Mozart: Piano Concertos Nos. 21 and 27 in rehearsal and performance (1992)
- Schubert: Winterreise (with Dietrich Fischer-Dieskau)
- Beethoven: Piano Concertos Nos. 1 and 3 (1988)
- Beethoven: Piano Concertos Nos. 2 and 4 (1988)
- Beethoven: Piano Concerto No. 5 (1988)
