= Carolina Marzán =

Chilean politician

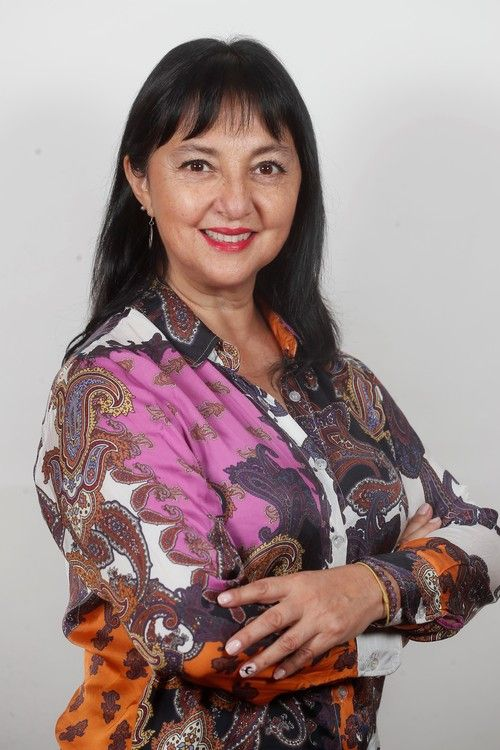
- Marzán in 2022

Member of the Chamber of Deputies of Chile
- Incumbent
- Assumed office 11 March 2018
- Preceded by: Creation of the District
- Constituency: District 6

Personal details
- Born: 22 December 1963 (age 62) Vina del Mar, Chile
- Party: Party for Democracy
- Spouse(s): Claudio Arredondo (1986–1988)
- Children: Matías and Carolina Arredondo
- Education: University of Chile
- Occupation: Politician
- Profession: Actress

Marta Carolina Marzán Pinto (born 22 December 1963) is a Chilean actress and politician who serves as a member of the Chamber of Deputies.

== Family and early life ==
She was born in Viña del Mar on 22 December 1963, the daughter of Galvarino Marzán Hinojosa and Ana Pinto Velásquez.

She is the mother of two children: a son, Matías, and a daughter, Carolina Arredondo, who served as Minister of Cultures, Arts and Heritage of Chile (2023–2026).

== Professional life ==
She completed her primary education in Viña del Mar and graduated from secondary education in 1981 at the Colegio Inglés Religiosas Pasionistas in Quilpué.

She holds a degree in arts, with a specialization in theatre, from the University of Chile.

She began her professional acting career in 1989 with a minor role in the television series La Intrusa broadcast by Canal 13. That same year, in March 1989, she joined Chile Films, participating in the television program Los Venegas, whose first episode aired on Televisión Nacional de Chile on 1 May 1989 and remained on air for twenty years. She portrayed the character “Paolita” until September 2008.

She has worked as an actress and director of the theatre companies El Furgón Azul (2002) and El Espejo (2005). She also worked as an actress and producer in Gothenburg, Sweden, in 2007 and 2009.

She has performed acting work for the municipalities of Pedro Aguirre Cerda (2007), Quilpué and Villa Alemana (2010), and Lo Espejo (2013).

In 2012, she served as a lecturer at the University of Valparaíso and later at AIEP (Valparaíso campus) in 2014, as well as at the Instituto Internacional de Artes Culinarias y Servicios (Culinary), La Dehesa campus, in the same year. She also worked as a theatre workshop instructor at Andrés Bello University in its Viña del Mar and Santiago campuses between 2011 and 2012.

That same year, she appeared in the HBO television series Prófugos, playing the role of “Magaly”, and participated in the television program Cosechando la tarde broadcast by AgroTV. In 2014, she was part of the cast of the film Ganar un Amigo, filmed entirely in the Atacama Region. Afterward, she continued to conduct independent theatre workshops.

== Political career ==
She is a former member of the Party for Democracy (PPD). Her political career began after being invited by the party—particularly by Senator Ricardo Lagos Weber—to run as a candidate for the Chamber of Deputies of Chile for the 6th electoral district. Prior to this, her name had been considered as a potential candidate for mayor.

On 28 March 2017, she announced her candidacy for deputy for the 6th electoral district of the Valparaíso Region, which includes the communes of La Ligua, Petorca, Cabildo, Papudo, Zapallar, Puchuncaví, Quintero, Nogales, Calera, La Cruz, Quillota, Hijuelas, Los Andes, San Esteban, Calle Larga, Rinconada, San Felipe, Putaendo, Santa María, Panquehue, Llaillay, Catemu, Olmué, Limache, Villa Alemana and Quilpué. Her candidacy was formalized in August 2017 as a representative of the Party for Democracy within the La Fuerza de la Mayoría coalition.

She was elected in the parliamentary elections held on 19 November 2017, obtaining 14,422 votes, equivalent to 4.54% of the valid votes cast.

In August 2021, she sought re-election for the same district, representing the Party for Democracy within the New Social Pact coalition for the 2022–2026 legislative term. She was re-elected on 21 November 2021 with the second-highest vote total in the district, obtaining 33,613 votes, equivalent to 9.46% of the valid votes cast.

She served as regional president of the Party for Democracy in the Valparaíso Region from November 2023 until October 2025.

She later ran as a candidate for the Senate of Chile for the 6th senatorial constituency of the Valparaíso Region in the parliamentary elections held on 16 November 2025, representing the Party for Democracy within the Unidad por Chile coalition. She was not elected, obtaining 84,006 votes, equivalent to 7.19% of the valid votes cast.

Following these elections, she resigned from the PPD.
