= Iván Mesías =

Chilean politician (1935–2022)

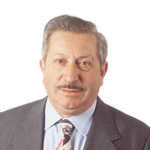

Member of the Chamber of Deputies
- In office 11 March 1998 – 11 March 2002
- Constituency: 48th District

Personal details
- Born: 3 April 1935 Santiago, Chile
- Died: 19 December 2022 (aged 87) Santiago, Chile
- Party: Radical Party
- Occupation: Politician

Iván Mesías Lehu (3 April 1935 – 19 December 2022) was a Chilean businessman politician who served as a Deputy between 1998 and 2002.

== Biography ==
He was born in Yumbel on 3 April 1935, the son of Luis Mesías and Lucrecia Lehu. He married Juana Sánchez Farías, and they had three children.

He completed his studies at the Public School of Yumbel and at the Liceo de Quintero.

Professionally, between 1953 and 1960 he worked in commerce in Quintero. He later became a salesman for the rice company "La Perla", later renamed "Arrocera Cristales", in Santiago, where he rose to general manager and became a principal partner. In 1969, he joined Sociedad Anónima PUMAC, dedicated to distribution, import and export—particularly in the agricultural and food sectors—serving as general manager and, from 1974, as president.

Between 1974 and 1983, he was general manager of SODICI, and from 1983 onward, general manager of FACIL in Santiago. From 1990, he was involved in the real estate sector.

== Political career ==
He began his political activities in 1953 by joining the Radical Party, becoming founder of the Radical Youth in Quintero.

He remained in the party until 1973 and rejoined in 1989. From that year, he served as a national party leader until 1990. In 1994, when the Radical Social Democratic Party (PRSD) was formed, he became part of its provisional leadership as International Secretary. In 2000, he assumed the position of Second National Vice President of the PRSD.

In December 1993, he ran as a candidate for deputy for District No. 31 (Talagante, Peñaflor, El Monte, Isla de Maipo, Melipilla, María Pinto, Curacaví, Alhué and San Pedro), Santiago Metropolitan Region, for the 1994–1998 term, but was not elected.

In December 1997, he was elected deputy for District No. 42 (Bulnes, Cabrero, Cobquecura, Coelemu, Ninhue, Ñiquén, Portezuelo, Quillón, Quirihue, Ranquil, San Carlos, San Fabián, San Nicolás, Treguaco and Yumbel), Eighth Region, for the 1998–2002 term. He obtained the highest vote in the district with 38,532 votes (37.94%).

In December 2001, he again ran for deputy, this time for District No. 11 (Los Andes, San Esteban, Calle Larga, Rinconada, San Felipe, Putaendo, Santa María, Panquehue, Llay-Llay and Catemu), for the 2002–2006 term, but was not elected.

Between May and August 2014, he served as interim president of the Radical Social Democratic Party.
