= 2020 Chilean constitutional referendum =

- 25 October 2020

Question 1: Do you want a new constitution?
Approve	78.28%
Reject	21.72%

Question 2: What kind of body should write the new constitution?
Mixed Convention	21.01%
Const. Convention	78.99%
- Results of the first (left) and second (right) question by commune

A constitutional referendum was held in Chile on 25 October 2020. The referendum asked the citizens whether they wanted a new constitution to be drafted, and if so, whether it should be written by a constitutional convention made up of directly elected citizens or by a mixed convention that was composed of currently serving members of Parliament and half of directly elected citizens. The "Approve" side won by a landslide, with 78% of voters agreeing to draft a new constitution. When it came to deciding how the new text should be written, 79% of voters opted for a "Constitutional Convention." The voter turnout was 51%.

A second vote was held between 15 and 16 May 2021, in conjunction with the municipal and gubernatorial elections. This vote elected the members of the Constitutional Convention. The new draft constitution was then rejected in a third vote held on 4 September 2022.

The plebiscite was a response to the 2019 Chilean protests, particularly the so-called "biggest march of Chile", which took place in Santiago on 25 October 2019, and was participated in by over 1.2 million people.

As a result, a proposed Constitution was written by a Constitutional Convention between 2021 and 2022, only to be rejected by another referendum in September 2022.

== Postponement ==
Due to the COVID-19 pandemic, the plebiscite originally scheduled for 26 April 2020 was rescheduled to 25 October 2020 by the Congress on 24 March 2020. Similarly, the subsequent Convention election, originally set for 25 October 2020, was moved to 11 April 2021, and later to 15–16 May 2021. This rescheduling required a constitutional reform, which was promulgated by the President and published in the country's Official Gazette on 26 March 2020.

== Campaign ==
=== Parties supporting Approve ===
- Chile Vamos
  - Independent Democratic Union (UDI) [factions]
  - National Renewal (RN) [factions]
  - Political Evolution (EVOPOLI) [factions]
  - Democratic Independent Regionalist Party (PRI)
- Citizens (CIU)
- Progressive Convergence
  - Party for Democracy (PPD)
  - Social Democrat Radical Party (PRSD)
  - Socialist Party (PS)
- Broad Front
  - Commons
  - Social Convergence (CS)
  - Liberal Party (PL)
  - Democratic Revolution (RD)
  - Common Force (FC)
  - Unir Movement (MU)
- Christian Democratic Party (PDC)
- Green Ecologist Party (PEV)
- Humanist Party (PH)
- Pirate Party of Chile (PPCh)
- Unity for Change
  - Social Green Regionalist Federation (FREVS)
  - Communist Party (PC)
  - Progressive Party (PRO)

=== Parties supporting Reject ===
- Chile Vamos
  - Independent Democratic Union (UDI) [factions]
  - National Renewal (RN) [factions]
  - Political Evolution (EP) [factions]
- New Time (NT)
- Republican Party (PREP)

== Opinion polls ==
National polls for the first question: Do you want a new constitution?

- Do you want a new constitution?
- Approve
- Reject
- Don't know/No answer
- Line represents 3-week moving average for each option.

View source data.

National polls for the second question: What kind of body should write the new constitution?

- What kind of body should write the new constitution?
- Constitutional Convention
- Mixed Constitutional Convention
- Don't know/No answer
- Line represents 3-week moving average for each option.

View source data.

Field dates	Pollster	Question 1: Do you want a new constitution?			Question 2: What kind of body should write the new constitution?			Notes
Field dates	Pollster	Approve	Reject	DK/NA	Constitutional Convention	Mixed Constitutional Convention	DK/NA	Notes
15-Nov to 16-Nov	Cadem	82%	16%	2%	60%	35%	5%	
15-Nov to 17-Nov	Activa	81.1%	8.2%	4.4%	63.5%	24.4%	5.9%	"Approve" voters only.
21-Nov to 22-Nov	Cadem	85%	12%	3%	62%	33%	5%	
19-Nov to 26-Nov	Criteria	72%	13%	10%	51%	32%	10%	
22-Nov to 26-Nov	Activa	77.2%	6.6%	6%	47.4%	22.8%	12.3%	
28-Nov to 12-Dec	DESOC-COES	85.5%	8.1%	6.4%	51.4%	38.8%	9.8%	
28-Nov to 6-Jan	CEP	67%	13%	20%	44%	37%	19%	
18-Dec to 20-Dec	Cadem	86%	12%	1%	61%	36%	3%	
17-Dec to 26-Dec	Activa	75.8%	10.0%	8.8%	53.7%	23.7%	12.2%	
2-Jan to 3-Jan	Cadem	72%	20%	6%	51%	43%	6%	
8-Jan to 10-Jan	Cadem	74%	19%	5%	52%	43%	5%	
6-Jan to 15-Jan	MORI-FIEL	68%	17%	15%	42%	32%	26%	
10-Jan to 16-Jan	Activa	77.9%	8.8%	13.2%	57.2%	24.4%	8.6%	
18-Jan to 21-Jan	Data Influye	73%	22%	0%	54%	29%	17%	
22-Jan to 24-Jan	Cadem	66%	25%	6%	47%	45%	8%	
21-Jan to 28-Jan	Criteria	71%	21%	2%	56%	35%	2%	
24-Jan to 30-Jan	Activa	69.1%	14.5%	8.6%	50.3%	24.4%	15.4%	
29-Jan to 31-Jan	Cadem	72%	22%	4%	50%	42%	8%	
5-Feb to 7-Feb	Cadem	67%	27%	4%	51%	42%	7%	
6-Feb to 13-Feb	Activa	69.7%	14.2%	4.4%	44.1%	27.2%	14.2%	
12-Feb to 14-Feb	Cadem	67%	26%	–	50%	41%	–	
15-Feb to 18-Feb	Data Influye	75%	19%	0%	58%	27%	15%	
19-Feb to 21-Feb	Cadem	67%	25%	–	50%	42%	–	
19-Feb to 29-Feb	Criteria	67%	22%	4%	52%	34%	2%	
20-Feb to 28-Feb	Activa	69.6%	13.1%	7.8%	51.2%	24.4%	14.6%	
26-Feb to 28-Feb	Cadem	67%	25%	–	53%	36%	–	
4-Mar to 6-Mar	Cadem	66%	24%	–	58%	33%	–	
5-Mar to 12-Mar	Activa	65.3%	14.4%	–	50.8%	22.8%	–	
11-Mar to 13-Mar	Cadem	68%	21%	–	52%	38%	–	
14-Mar to 15-Mar	StatKnows	55.49%	34.72%	–	53.7%	28.8%	–	
14-Mar to 16-Mar	Data Influye	74%	18%	–	65%	24%	–	
18-Mar to 20-Mar	Cadem	62%	25%	–	51%	39%	–	
20-Mar to 27-Mar	Activa	68.7%	17.1%	–	54.6%	26.5%	–	
3-Abr to 9-Abr	Activa	70.0%	16.9%	–	46.9%	29.9%	–	
27-Abr to 28-Abr	Activa	74.2%	10.8%	–	53.1%	23.5%	–	
29-Abr to 30-Abr	Cadem	65%	26%	–	50%	42%	–	
11-May to 12-May	Activa	69.9%	16.6%	–	51.5%	26.9%	–	
26-May to 31-May	Criteria	72%	20%	–	N/A	N/A	N/A	
28-May to 30-May	Activa	70.2%	13.2%	–	45.2%	31.0%	–	
11-Jun to 13-Jun	Activa	73.0%	10.9%	–	49.6%	27.7%	–	
26-Jun to 28-Jun	Activa	68.1%	12.6%	–	46.5%	26.9%	–	
25-Jun to 30-Jun	Criteria	76%	16%	–	N/A	N/A	N/A	
9-Jul to 11-Jul	Activa	71.9%	11.9%	–	48.4%	26.5%	–	
10-Jul to 17-Jul	Numen	61.6%	27.7%	–	48.8%	28.8%	–	Commissioned by the "Reject" campaign team.
22-Jul to 24-Jul	Cadem	71%	20%	–	55%	35%	–	
27-Jul to 31-Jul	Criteria	75%	17%	–	N/A	N/A	N/A	
30-Jul to 1-Aug	Activa	77.0%	9.9%	–	48.7%	31.6%	–	
13-Aug to 15-Aug	Activa	68.0%	10.3%	–	49.0%	25.8%	–	
14-Aug to 21-Aug	Numen	42.3%	34.6%	–	N/A	N/A	N/A	Commissioned by the "Reject" campaign team.
20-Aug to 24-Aug	StatKnows	55.4%	43.09%	–	54%	33%	–	
21-Aug to 24-Aug	Data Influye	73%	13%	–	55%	26%	–	
25-Aug to 28-Aug	CPP-UNAB	54%	40%	–	44%	40%	–	
27-Aug to 29-Aug	Activa	71%	11.5%	–	46.5%	28%	–	
26-Aug to 31-Aug	Criteria	74%	17%	–	N/A	N/A	N/A	
2-Sep to 10-Sep	CIIR	75%	12%	–	65%	29%	–	
3-Sep to 17-Sep	MORI-FIEL	66%	15%	–	51%	27%	–	
10-Sep to 12-Sep	Activa	75.1%	11.2%	–	57%	23%	–	
14-Sep to 18-Sep	Numen	41.9%	34.3%	–	N/A	N/A	N/A	
25-Sep to 28-Sep	Activa	66.8%	17.1%	–	53.3%	23.8%	–	
15-Sep to 9-Oct	DESOC-COES	65.9%	13%	–	48.4%	27.4%	–	
25-Sep to 30-Sep	Criteria	72%	19%	–	59%	28%	–	
2-Oct to 5-Oct	Data influye	69%	18%	–	61%	21%	–	
1-Oct to 7-Oct	Numen	57.9%	42.1%	–	38.5%	35%	–	
6-Oct to 9-Oct	Activa	65.4%	14.3%	–	56.2%	20.1%	–	

== Results ==
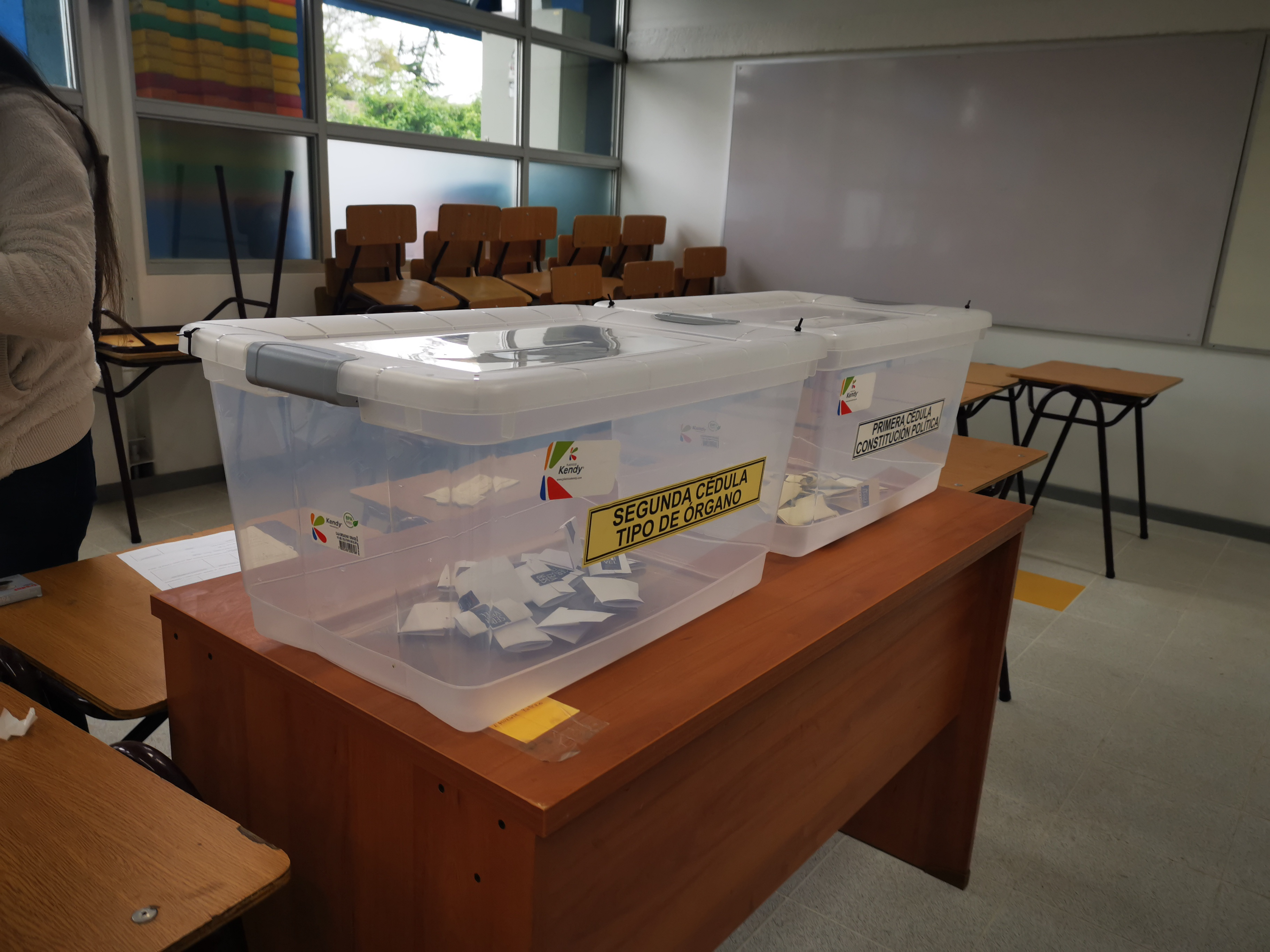
Ballot boxes in Olivar.

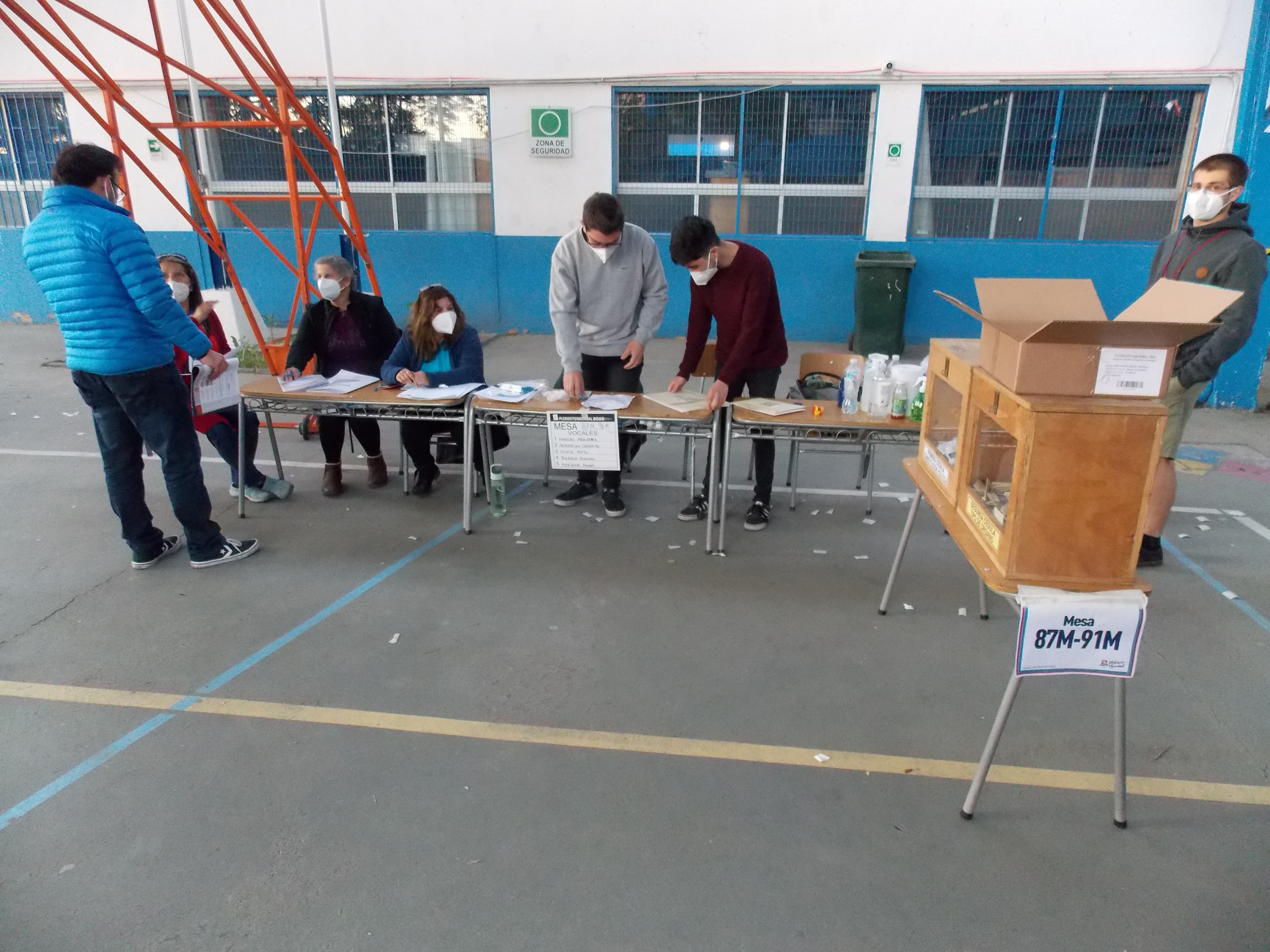
Vote taking place in Macul.

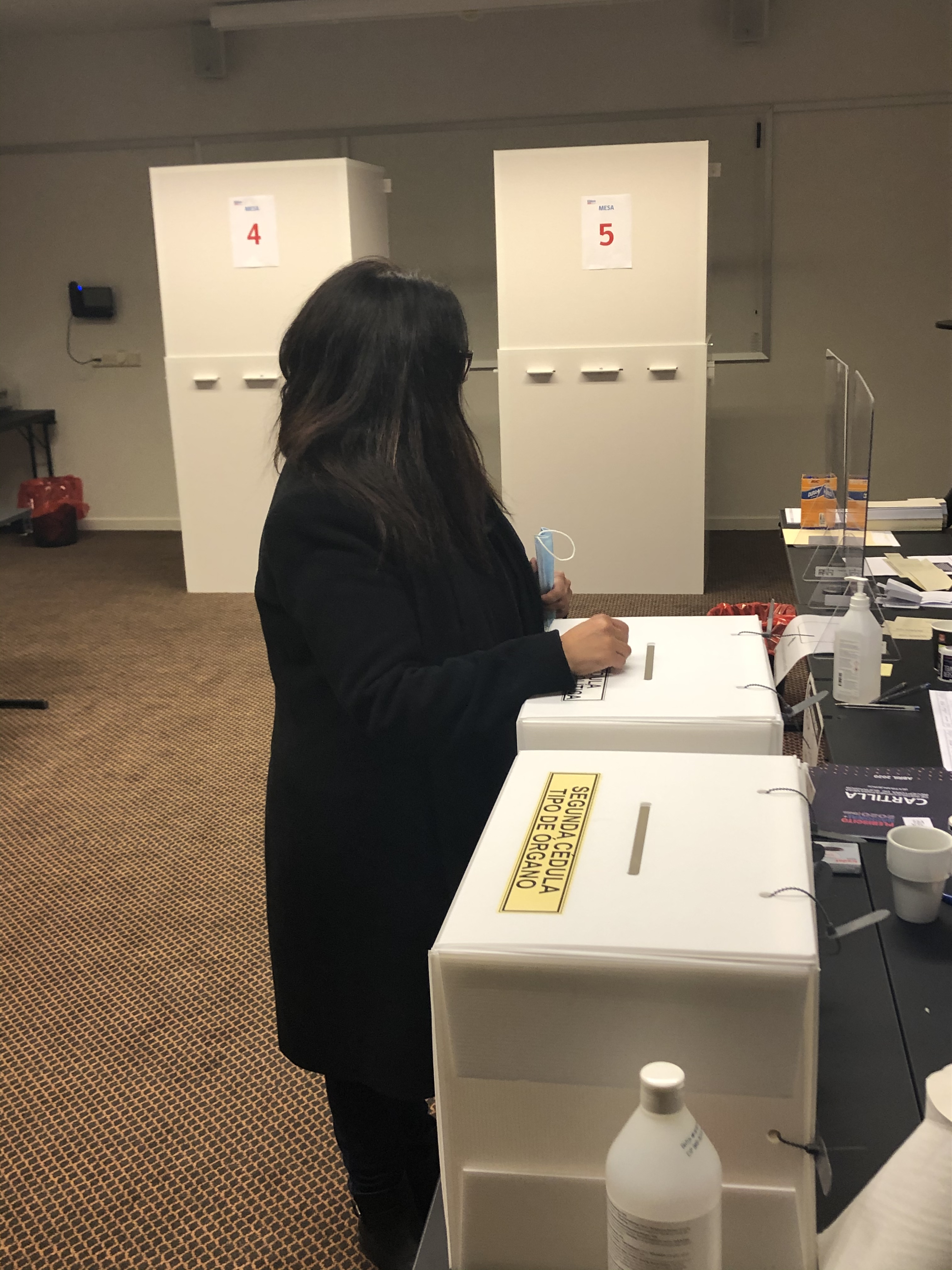
Chilean abroad voting in Stockholm.

=== First ballot: "Do you want a New Constitution?" ===
Choice	Votes	%
Approve	5,899,683	78.31%
Reject	1,634,506	21.69%
Valid votes	7,534,189	99.48%
Null votes	27,381	0.36%
Blank votes	12,344	0.16%
Total votes	7,573,914	100.00%
Registered voters/turnout	14,855,719^{a}	50.98%
Voting age population/turnout	15,052,382	50.32%

^{a} Includes 59,522 electors voting from abroad.
Source: Tricel.

Breakdown by region and province
Region/Province	Approve	Reject	Null	Blank	Total
Antofagasta	129,379 (83.6%)	24,735 (16.0%)	468 (0.03%)	146 (0.01%)	154,728
El Loa	55,285 (83.1%)	10,739 (16.1%)	372 (0.06%)	103 (0.02%)	66,499
Tocopilla	11,149 (89.7%)	1,210 (9.7%)	45 (0.04%)	22 (0.02%)	12,426
Antofagasta	195,813 (83.8%)	36,684 (15.7%)	885 (0.04%)	271 (0.01%)	233,653
Cautín	189,102 (67.8%)	87,898 (31.5%)	1,308 (0.05%)	689 (0.02%)	278,997
Malleco	43,772 (60.8%)	27,441 (38.1%)	475 (0.07%)	319 (0.04%)	72,007
Araucanía	232,874 (66.3%)	115,339 (32.9%)	1,783 (0.05%)	1,008 (0.03%)	351,004
Arica	64,778 (76.0%)	19,875 (23.3%)	423 (0.05%)	169 (0.02%)	85,245
Parinacota	939 (67.7%)	426 (30.7%)	16 (0.12%)	7 (0.05%)	1,388
Arica y Parinacota	65,717 (75.9%)	20,301 (23.4%)	439 (0.05%)	176 (0.02%)	86,633
Chañaral	10,071 (90.2%)	1,043 (9.3%)	34 (0.03%)	22 (0.02%)	11,170
Copiapó	63,045 (84.2%)	11,447 (15.3%)	290 (0.04%)	91 (0.01%)	74,873
Huasco	26,317 (88.2%)	3,329 (11.2%)	131 (0.04%)	52 (0.02%)	29,829
Atacama	99,433 (85.8%)	15,819 (13.7%)	455 (0.04%)	165 (0.01%)	115,872
Aysén	8,917 (78.7%)	2,340 (20.7%)	46 (0.04%)	28 (0.02%)	11,331
Capitán Prat	1,229 (75.7%)	388 (23.9%)	5 (0.03%)	2 (0.01%)	1,624
Coyhaique	17,412 (76.1%)	5,367 (23.5%)	61 (0.03%)	45 (0.02%)	22,885
General Carrera	2,034 (77.7%)	566 (21.6%)	7 (0.03%)	10 (0.04%)	2,617
Aysén	29,592 (76.9%)	8,661 (22.5%)	119 (0.03%)	85 (0.02%)	38,457
Arauco	40,295 (68.9%)	17,670 (30.2%)	349 (0.06%)	188 (0.03%)	58,502
Biobío	93,950 (67.1%)	44,844 (32.0%)	848 (0.06%)	458 (0.03%)	140,100
Concepción	329,827 (75.6%)	103,820 (23.8%)	1,748 (0.04%)	727 (0.02%)	436,122
Biobío	464,072 (73.1%)	166,334 (26.2%)	2,945 (0.05%)	1,373 (0.02%)	634,724
Choapa	31,149 (87.0%)	4,438 (12.4%)	150 (0.04%)	75 (0.02%)	35,812
Elqui	161,029 (83.2%)	31,698 (16.4%)	586 (0.03%)	247 (0.01%)	193,560
Limarí	53,427 (85.6%)	8,548 (13.7%)	260 (0.04%)	161 (0.03%)	62,396
Coquimbo	245,605 (84.2%)	44,684 (15.3%)	996 (0.03%)	483 (0.02%)	291,768
Chiloé	46,534 (82.2%)	9,661 (17.1%)	254 (0.04%)	194 (0.03%)	56,643
Llanquihue	109,285 (71.3%)	42,968 (28.0%)	579 (0.04%)	392 (0.03%)	153,224
Osorno	71,780 (72.5%)	26,593 (26.9%)	387 (0.04%)	227 (0.02%)	98,987
Palena	4,341 (74.4%)	1,443 (24.7%)	28 (0.05%)	23 (0.03%)	5,835
Los Lagos	231,940 (73.7%)	80,665 (25.6%)	1,248 (0.04%)	836 (0.03%)	314,689
El Ranco	24,261 (68.1%)	11,068 (31.1%)	190 (0.05%)	117 (0.03%)	35,636
Valdivia	93,070 (76.0%)	28,609 (23.4%)	511 (0.04%)	304 (0.02%)	122,494
Los Ríos	117,331 (74.2%)	39,677 (25.1%)	701 (0.04%)	421 (0.03%)	158,130
Antártica Chilena	385 (57.0%)	290 (42.9%)	1 (0.01%)	0 (0.00%)	676
Magallanes	43,321 (79.2%)	11,203 (20.5%)	131 (0.02%)	62 (0.01%)	54,717
Tierra del Fuego	1,820 (82.2%)	386 (17.4%)	7 (0.03%)	0 (0.00%)	2,213
Última Esperanza	6,978 (83.2%)	1,365 (16.3%)	29 (0.03%)	18 (0.02%)	8,390
Magallanes and Antártica Chilena	52,504 (79.6%)	13,244 (20.1%)	168 (0.03%)	80 (0.01%)	65,996
Cauquenes	11,936 (63.2%)	6,744 (35.7%)	110 (0.06%)	86 (0.05%)	18,876
Curicó	93,166 (77.6%)	26,212 (21.8%)	494 (0.04%)	221 (0.02%)	120,093
Linares	69,501 (71.5%)	27,089 (27.9%)	436 (0.04%)	206 (0.02%)	97,232
Talca	125,090 (77.1%)	36,258 (22.4%)	562 (0.03%)	276 (0.02%)	162,186
Maule	299,693 (75.2%)	96,303 (24.2%)	1,602 (0.04%)	789 (0.02%)	398,837
Diguillín	87,138 (70.5%)	35,772 (28.9%)	508 (0.04%)	259 (0.02%)	123,677
Itata	15,139 (71.7%)	5,796 (27.4%)	115 (0.05%)	73 (0.03%)	21,123
Punilla	23,392 (66.4%)	11,558 (32.8%)	199 (0.06%)	98 (0.03%)	35,247
Ñuble	125,669 (69.8%)	53,126 (29.5%)	822 (0.05%)	430 (0.02%)	180,047
Cachapoal	227,323 (81.9%)	48,905 (17.6%)	898 (0.03%)	439 (0.02%)	277,565
Cardenal Caro	16,006 (80.3%)	3,803 (19.1%)	90 (0.05%)	43 (0.02%)	19,942
Colchagua	70,484 (78.8%)	18,542 (20.7%)	305 (0.03%)	137 (0.02%)	89,468
O'Higgins	313,813 (81.1%)	71,250 (18.4%)	1,293 (0.03%)	619 (0.02%)	386,975
Chacabuco	65,307 (73.3%)	23,237 (26.1%)	335 (0.04%)	165 (0.02%)	89,044
Cordillera	222,363 (87.4%)	30,965 (12.2%)	703 (0.03%)	278 (0.01%)	254,309
Maipo	166,812 (82.9%)	33,253 (16.5%)	741 (0.04%)	304 (0.02%)	201,110
Melipilla	55,817 (80.9%)	12,830 (18.6%)	267 (0.04%)	114 (0.02%)	69,028
Santiago	2,012,559 (78.4%)	544,495 (21.2%)	8,009 (0.03%)	3,217 (0.01%)	2,568,280
Talagante	112,159 (83.6%)	21,348 (15.9%)	435 (0.03%)	195 (0.01%)	134,137
Santiago Metropolitan Region	2,635,017 (79.5%)	666,128 (20.1%)	10,490 (0.03%)	4,273 (0.01%)	3,315,908
Iquique	82,692 (77.6%)	23,413 (22.0%)	373 (0.03%)	151 (0.01%)	106,629
Tamarugal	7,059 (71.7%)	2,682 (27.2%)	80 (0.08%)	26 (0.03%)	9,847
Tarapacá	89,751 (77.1%)	26,095 (22.4%)	453 (0.04%)	177 (0.02%)	116,476
Easter Island	2,292 (84.1%)	416 (15.3%)	11 (0.04%)	7 (0.03%)	2,726
Los Andes	42,453 (81.7%)	9,226 (17.8%)	201 (0.04%)	78 (0.02%)	51,958
Marga Marga	120,135 (77.2%)	34,829 (22.4%)	548 (0.04%)	180 (0.01%)	155,692
Petorca	31,704 (83.1%)	6,242 (16.4%)	138 (0.04%)	63 (0.02%)	38,147
Quillota	74,343 (82.1%)	15,769 (17.4%)	339 (0.04%)	144 (0.02%)	90,595
San Antonio	65,692 (82.2%)	13,919 (17.4%)	210 (0.03%)	86 (0.01%)	79,907
San Felipe de Aconcagua	57,029 (83.5%)	10,880 (15.9%)	290 (0.04%)	100 (0.01%)	68,299
Valparaíso	281,880 (76.8%)	83,367 (22.7%)	1,193 (0.03%)	469 (0.01%)	366,909
Valparaíso	675,528 (79.1%)	174,648 (20.4%)	2,930 (0.03%)	1,127 (0.01%)	854,223
Voters abroad	25,331 (81.8%)	5,548 (17.9%)	52 (0.02%)	31 (0.01%)	30,962
Total	5,899,683 (77.9%)	1,634,506 (21.6%)	27,381 (0.04%)	12,344 (0.02%)	7,573,914

=== Second ballot: "What kind of body should write the New Constitution?" ===
Choice	Votes	%
Mixed Constitutional Convention	1,492,260	20.82%
Constitutional Convention	5,673,793	79.18%
Valid votes	7,166,053	94.62%
Null votes	283,794	3.75%
Blank votes	123,277	1.63%
Total votes	7,573,124	100.00%
Registered voters/turnout	14,855,719^{a}	50.98%
Voting age population/turnout	15,052,382	50.31%

^{a} Includes 59,522 electors voting from abroad.
Source: Tricel.

Breakdown by region and province
Region/Province	Mixed Constitutional Convention	Constitutional Convention	Null	Blank	Total
Antofagasta	22,822 (14.8%)	124,727 (80.6%)	5,420 (3.5%)	1,680 (1.1%)	154,709
El Loa	10,243 (15.4%)	52,719 (79.3%)	2,504 (3.8%)	1,038 (1.6%)	66,504
Tocopilla	1,492 (12.0%)	10,573 (85.2%)	222 (1.8%)	128 (1.0%)	12,415
Antofagasta	34,617 (14.8%)	188,019 (80.5%)	8,146 (3.5%)	2,846 (1.2%)	233,628
Cautín	72,924 (26.1%)	184,437 (66.1%)	13,304 (4.8%)	8,308 (3.0%)	278,973
Malleco	20,259 (28.1%)	43,699 (60.7%)	4,920 (6.8%)	3,121 (4.3%)	71,999
Araucanía	93,183 (26.5%)	228,136 (65.0%)	18,224 (5.2%)	11,429 (3.3%)	350,972
Arica	15,958 (18.7%)	62,674 (73.6%)	4,891 (5.7%)	1,685 (2.0%)	85,208
Parinacota	353 (25.4%)	899 (64.8%)	95 (6.8%)	31 (3.0%)	1,388
Arica y Parinacota	16,311 (18.8%)	63,573 (73.4%)	4,986 (5.8%)	1,726 (2.0%)	86,596
Chañaral	1,381 (12.4%)	9,454 (84.7%)	220 (2.0%)	111 (1.0%)	11,166
Copiapó	11,210 (15.0%)	60,456 (80.7%)	2,358 (3.1%)	850 (1.1%)	74,874
Huasco	3,793 (12.7%)	24,932 (83.5%)	735 (2.5%)	384 (1.3%)	29,844
Atacama	16,384 (14.1%)	94,842 (81.8%)	3,313 (2.9%)	1,345 (1.2%)	115,884
Aysén	2,459 (21.7%)	8,126 (71.7%)	414 (3.7%)	333 (2.9%)	11,332
Capitán Prat	362 (22.3%)	1,168 (71.9%)	40 (2.5%)	54 (3.3%)	1,624
Coyhaique	4,890 (21.4%)	16,516 (72.2%)	902 (3.9%)	574 (2.5%)	22,882
General Carrera	534 (20.4%)	1,939 (73.7%)	75 (2.9%)	80 (3.1%)	2,618
Aysén	8,245 (21.4%)	27,739 (72.1%)	1,431 (3.7%)	1,041 (2.7%)	38,455
Arauco	13,629 (23.3%)	39,950 (67.6%)	2,932 (5.0%)	2,357 (4.0%)	58,468
Biobío	36,407 (26.0%)	91,721 (65.5%)	7,132 (5.1%)	4,784 (3.4%)	140,044
Concepción	87,917 (20.0%)	320,978 (73.6%)	19,871 (4.6%)	8,029 (1.8%)	436,075
Biobío	137,233 (21.6%)	452,249 (71.3%)	29,935 (4.7%)	15,170 (2.4%)	634,587
Choapa	5,391 (15.1%)	29,043 (81.1%)	853 (2.4%)	522 (1.5%)	35,809
Elqui	30,870 (16.0%)	153,592 (79.4%)	6,775 (3.5%)	2,292 (1.2%)	193,529
Limarí	10,495 (16.8%)	49,267 (79.0%)	1,616 (2.6%)	998 (1.6%)	62,376
Coquimbo	46,756 (16.0%)	231,902 (79.5%)	9,244 (3.2%)	3,812 (1.3%)	291,714
Chiloé	10,169 (18.0%)	43,285 (76.4%)	1,570 (2.8%)	1,617 (2.9%)	56,641
Llanquihue	35,883 (23.4%)	105,435 (68.8%)	7,721 (5.0%)	4,175 (2.7%)	153,214
Osorno	23,783 (24.0%)	68,360 (69.1%)	4,396 (4.4%)	2,415 (2.4%)	98,954
Palena	1,357 (23.2%)	4,003 (68.5%)	236 (4.0%)	243 (4.3%)	5,845
Los Lagos	71,192 (22.6%)	221,083 (70.3%)	13,923 (4.4%)	8,456 (2.7%)	314,654
El Ranco	9,276 (26.1%)	23,463 (65.9%)	1,628 (4.6%)	1,228 (3.4%)	35,595
Valdivia	26,520 (21.7%)	88,304 (72.1%)	4,775 (3.9%)	2,868 (2.3%)	122,467
Los Ríos	35,796 (22.6%)	111,767 (70.7%)	6,403 (4.1%)	4,096 (2.6%)	158,062
Antártica Chilena	197 (29.1%)	385 (57.0%)	68 (10.1%)	26 (3.8%)	676
Magallanes	9,968 (18.2%)	41,226 (75.4%)	2,613 (4.8%)	888 (1.6%)	54,695
Tierra del Fuego	389 (17.6%)	1,699 (76.8%)	74 (3.3%)	51 (2.3%)	2,213
Última Esperanza	1,539 (18.3%)	6,396 (76.2%)	283 (3.4%)	173 (2.1%)	8,391
Magallanes and Antártica Chilena	12,093 (18.3%)	49,706 (75.3%)	3,038 (4.6%)	1,138 (1.7%)	65,975
Cauquenes	5,059 (26.8%)	11,852 (62.8%)	1,142 (6.1%)	822 (4.4%)	18,875
Curicó	25,523 (21.3%)	87,988 (73.3%)	4,192 (3.5%)	2,356 (2.0%)	120,059
Linares	22,939 (23.6%)	66,974 (68.9%)	4,629 (4.8%)	2,700 (2.8%)	97,242
Talca	33,643 (20.7%)	119,025 (73.4%)	6,302 (3.9%)	3,239 (2.0%)	162,209
Maule	87,164 (21.9%)	285,839 (71.7%)	16,265 (4.1%)	9,117 (2.3%)	398,385
Diguillín	29,758 (24.1%)	84,259 (68.1%)	6,386 (5.2%)	3,237 (2.6%)	123,640
Itata	5,360 (25.4%)	14,158 (67.0%)	886 (4.2%)	719 (3.4%)	21,123
Punilla	9,391 (26.6%)	22,578 (64.1%)	1,902 (5.4%)	1,374 (3.9%)	35,245
Ñuble	44,509 (24.7%)	120,995 (67.2%)	9,174 (5.1%)	5,330 (3.0%)	180,008
Cachapoal	49,303 (17.8%)	215,973 (77.8%)	8,208 (3.0%)	4,101 (1.5%)	277,585
Cardenal Caro	3,884 (19.5%)	15,101 (75.8%)	576 (2.9%)	370 (1.9%)	19,931
Colchagua	17,649 (19.7%)	67,079 (75.0%)	3,029 (3.4%)	1,724 (1.4%)	89,481
O'Higgins	70,836 (18.3%)	298,153 (77.0%)	11,813 (3.1%)	6,195 (1.6%)	386,997
Chacabuco	22,183 (24.9%)	62,308 (70.0%)	3,152 (3.5%)	1,414 (1.6%)	89,057
Cordillera	32,483 (12.8%)	213,066 (83.8%)	6,282 (2.5%)	2,448 (1.0%)	254,279
Maipo	33,082 (16.4%)	159,355 (79.2%)	6,179 (3.1%)	2,516 (1.3%)	201,132
Melipilla	12,935 (18.7%)	52,904 (76.7%)	2,083 (3.0%)	1,094 (1.6%)	69,016
Santiago	509,330 (19.8%)	1,945,302 (75.7%)	84,879 (3.3%)	28,548 (1.1%)	2,568,059
Talagante	21,920 (16.3%)	106,666 (79.5%)	3,849 (2.9%)	1,678 (1.3%)	134,113
Santiago Metropolitan Region	631,933 (19.1%)	2,539,601 (76.6%)	106,424 (3.2%)	37,698 (1.1%)	3,315,656
Iquique	19,872 (18.6%)	79,675 (74.8%)	5,090 (4.8%)	1,903 (1.8%)	106,630
Tamarugal	2,054 (20.9%)	6,837 (69.4%)	610 (6.2%)	346 (3.5%)	9,847
Tarapacá	21,926 (18.8%)	86,602 (74.4%)	5,700 (4.9%)	2,249 (1.9%)	116,477
Easter Island	612 (22.5%)	2,018 (74.1%)	53 (1.9%)	42 (1.5%)	2,725
Los Andes	9,145 (17.6%)	40,382 (77.7%)	1,737 (3.3%)	698 (1.3%)	51,962
Marga Marga	28,402 (18.2%)	116,727 (75.0%)	8,281 (5.3%)	2,252 (1.4%)	155,662
Petorca	6,734 (17.7%)	29,980 (78.6%)	880 (2.3%)	548 (1.4%)	38,142
Quillota	15,295 (16.9%)	70,954 (78.3%)	3,050 (3.4%)	1,278 (1.4%)	90,577
San Antonio	14,088 (17.6%)	62,552 (78.3%)	2,423 (3.0%)	855 (1.1%)	79,918
San Felipe de Aconcagua	11,137 (16.3%)	54,047 (79.2%)	2,114 (3.1%)	976 (1.4%)	68,274
Valparaíso	73,371 (20.0%)	272,324 (74.2%)	16,419 (4.5%)	4,736 (1.6%)	366,850
Valparaíso	158,784 (18.6%)	648,984 (76.0%)	34,957 (4.1%)	11,385 (1.3%)	854,110
Voters abroad	5,298 (17.1%)	24,603 (79.5%)	818 (2.6%)	244 (0.08%)	30,963
Total	1,492,260 (19.7%)	5,673,793 (74.9%)	283,794 (3.7%)	123,277 (1.6%)	7,573,124
