= Javier Muñoz Delgado =

Javier Muñoz
- Born: Javier Francisco Muñoz Delgado; 13 July 1972; El Tambo, Chile
- Died: 29 August 2015 (aged 43); Panquehue, Chile
- Education: Pedro de Valdivia University
- Occupation: Sports commentator

Javier Francisco Muñoz Delgado (born 13 July 1972 – 29 August 2015) was a Chilean journalist and play-by-play commentator known for his narrations at Canal del Futbol (CDF).

== Biography ==
=== Early life: 1972–1990 ===
He was born and raised in a humble town called El Tambo, specifically in Oscar Bonilla barrio, a 'campamento' named in honour of the Chilean Army's homologous general (1918–1975). He attended first the Alonso de Ercilla School during his primary education and then went to the high school at Los Andes Commercial Lyceum.

Being a teenager, he already animated meetings and even began to work in media like Radio Trasandina. This allowed him to find work in San Felipe, Aconcagua Province's capital city. Here, he worked at Radio Colunquén, where he broadcast the program El Clan Juvenil (or «The youth clan»), which marked a radical epoch for San Felipe's people. Nevertheless, soon he began to get closer to being a sports commentator, the reason why he moved to Radio Aconcagua.

=== Rising in CDF: 2005–2015 ===
In 2005, he joined Canal del Fútbol, where he began narrating deferred football matches of Primera División de Chile (first tier) and Primera B (second tier) and, besides, some Primera División live matches. His skills made him rise within the channel, being his first peak the broadcasting of the 2007 Torneo Clausura Playoffs finals between Colo-Colo and Universidad de Concepción —won by the first one team that achieved its first one tetra-championship—.

=== Death ===
He died at 7:00 AM on August 29, 2015, after being crashed into by a motorist whilst he was driving in a regional road from a little town to his hometown San Felipe.

== Tributes ==
On September 2, 2015, the major of San Felipe, Patricio Freire, announced that the city's municipal stadium remodelation will hold his name once finished the works.
