= Javier Muñoz =

Javier Muñoz may refer to:

- Javier Muñoz Delgado (1972–2015), Chilean journalist and sports commentator
- Javier Muñoz (Spanish footballer) (born 1995), Spanish footballer for Real Madrid Castilla
- Javier Muñoz (Argentine footballer) (born 1980), Argentine footballer for Chiapas F.C.
- Javier Muñoz (actor) (born 1975), American stage actor
- Javier Muñoz Riquelme, Chilean politician
