= Los Andes Province, Chile =

Los Andes Province Provincia de Los Andes
- Province
- Seal

- Location in the Valparaíso Region

- Location in Chile
- Coordinates: 32°51′S 70°21′W
- Country: Chile
- Region: Valparaíso
- Capital: Los Andes
- Communes: List of 4: Calle Larga; Los Andes; San Esteban; Rinconada

Government
  - Type: Provincial
  - Presidential Provincial Delegate: Cristian Aravena Reyes (Socialist Party)

Area
  - Total: 3,054.1 km^{2} (1,179.2 sq mi)
  - Rank: 2

Population (2012 Census)
  - Total: 102,819
  - Rank: 6
  - Density: 33.666/km^{2} (87.194/sq mi)
  - Urban: 74,104
  - Rural: 17,579

Sex
  - Men: 46,325
  - Women: 45,358
- Time zone: UTC-4 (CLT)
  - Summer (DST): UTC-3 (CLST)
- Area code: 56 + 34
- Website: Delegation of Los Andes

Los Andes Province (Spanish: Provincia de Los Andes) is one of eight provinces of the central Chilean region of Valparaíso (V). The city of Los Andes is the capital of the province.

== Administration ==
As a province, Los Andes is a second-level administrative division, governed by a provincial delegate who is appointed by the president. Edith Quiroz Ortiz, appointed by president Piñera on April 22, 2010, was the first woman to hold the office of Governor of Los Andes. The presidential provincial delegate appointed by president Gabriel Boric is Cristian Aravena Reyes, a Socialist.

=== Communes ===
The province is composed of four communes (Spanish: comunas), each governed by a municipality consisting of an alcalde and municipal council:

- Calle Larga
- Los Andes
- San Esteban
- Rinconada

== Geography and demography ==
The province spans a landlocked area of 3,054.1 km^{2} (1,179 sq mi), the second largest in the Valparaíso Region. According to the 2002 census, Los Andes is the sixth most populous province in the region with a population of 91,683. At that time, there were 74,104 people living in urban areas, 17,579 people living in rural areas, 46,325 men and 45,358 women.
