= Llay-Llay =

Llay-Llay Llaillay
- Town and Commune
- Coat of arms Location in Chile
- Coordinates: 32°50′25″S 70°56′54″W
- Country: Chile
- Region: Valparaíso
- Province: San Felipe de Aconcagua

Government
  - Type: Municipality
  - Alcalde: Mario Marillanca

Area
  - Total: 349.1 km^{2} (134.8 sq mi)
- Elevation: 385 m (1,263 ft)

Population (2024 Census)
  - Total: 25,484
  - Density: 73.00/km^{2} (189.1/sq mi)
  - Urban (2002): 16,215
  - Rural (2002): 5,429
- Demonym(s): Llaillaíno, -a

Sex (2002)
  - Men: 10,799
  - Women: 10,845
- Time zone: UTC-4 (CLT)
  - Summer (DST): UTC-3 (CLST)
- Area code: 56 + 34
- Website: www.munillay.cl

Llay-Llay is a town and commune in the San Felipe de Aconcagua Province of central Chile's Valparaíso Region.

== Toponymy ==
The name of the commune comes from the Mapudungun word llayllay, and it means “gentle breeze.”

Regarding this, Benjamín Vicuña Mackenna wrote:

En cuanto a Llay-Llay, unos dicen que significa viento, viento, y otros que es palabra quichua que imite el zumbido del zancudo. De lo uno y de lo otro puede ser a nuestro juicio, porque viento y zancudos no han faltado en Llay-Llay.

As for Llay-Llay, some say it means wind, wind, and others that it is a Quechua word that imitates the buzzing of the mosquito. It may be either one or the other in our judgment, for neither wind nor mosquitoes have been lacking in Llay-Llay. — Benjamín Vicuña Mackenna, From Valparaíso to Santiago, Across the Andes (1940)

== History ==
The commune was established on 6 April 1875 during the government of President Federico Errázuriz Zañartu, A railway station was initially built for the three copper smelters that existed there.

Llay-Llay made news on 14 September 1863, the date was celebrated with a grand banquet in the village to celebrate the official opening of the railway line between Santiago and Valparaiso, an act that was attended by the President of the Republic, Don José Joaquín Pérez. On 6 April 1875 by Supreme Decree it was granted the title of town.

The Commune of Llay-Llay was included into the Department of Quillota, which was split into four districts, in December 1925. According to the country's regional government, it became part of the province of San Felipe de Aconcagua in March 1976.

== Geography ==
The commune of Llay-Llay is located within the geomorphological units of the semi-arid transitional basins and the Coastal Mountain Range. Llay-Llay spans an area of 349.1 km^{2} (135 sq mi). Its territory lies on the southern bank of the Aconcagua River, at the entrance to the valley of the same name. The town was built on the lands and properties of the former Ucuquer estate.

Llay-Llay is geographically situated at 32°50′ South latitude and 70°59′ West longitude. It forms the western boundary of the San Felipe Province and serves as the gateway connecting it with the Central Valley of the Valparaíso Region. The area is almost entirely surrounded by chains of hills ranging from 100 to 1,600 meters above sea level.

It borders the communes of La Calera, Hijuelas, and Nogales to the west; Putaendo, San Felipe, and Rinconada to the east; Cabildo, Catemu, and Panquehue to the north; and the boundary of Tiltil Province to the south.

=== Hydrography ===
Llay-Llay lies between the Aconcagua River and Maipo River watersheds. The commune contains several bodies of water, most notably the Aconcagua River.

In terms of irrigation potential, the local hydrography is composed of the Aconcagua River, which crosses the northwestern sector of the commune, the Los Loros stream, and other smaller streams. These are connected to a network of primary and secondary canals that sufficiently support local agricultural activity under normal climatic conditions and are extremely important in shaping the local landscape.

== Demographics ==
According to data from the 2002 Census of Population and Housing, the Llay-Llay commune had 21,644 inhabitants; of these, 16,215 (74.9%) lived in urban areas and 5,429 (25.1%) in rural areas. At that time, there were 10,799 men and 10,845 women.

== Administration ==
As a commune, Llay-Llay is a third-level administrative division of Chile, administered by a communal council (consejo comunal), which is headed by a directly elected alcalde. The current alcalde is Mario Marillanca. The communal council has the following members:

- Patricio Durán
- Margarita Puebla
- Marcos Flores
- Mésala González
- Oscar Hidalgo
- Manuel Maldonado

Within the electoral divisions of Chile, Llaillay is represented in the Chamber of Deputies by Marco Antonio Núñez (PDC) and Gaspar Rivas (RN) as part of the 11th electoral district, together with Los Andes, San Esteban, Calle Larga, Rinconada, San Felipe, Putaendo, Santa María, Panquehue and Catemu. The commune is represented in the Senate by Ignacio Walker Prieto (PDC) and Lily Pérez San Martín (RN) as part of the 5th senatorial constituency (Valparaíso-Cordillera).

== Climate ==
According to the Köppen climate classification, Llay-Llay features a Mediterranean climate with winter rainfall (Csb), a highland Mediterranean climate with winter rainfall (Csb (h)), and a semi-arid climate with winter rainfall (BSk (s)). The four seasons are clearly marked, with high temperatures in summer and low temperatures in winter. The record high temperature of 42.0 °C (107.6 °F) was registered on January 26, 2019 in Llay-Llay.

The average annual precipitation is 364.5 mm (in normal years), with July being the rainiest month. The climate is favorable for tourism and agriculture, especially for the cultivation of export vegetables.

Climate data for Llay-Llay, elevation 385 m (1,263 ft)
Month	Jan	Feb	Mar	Apr	May	Jun	Jul	Aug	Sep	Oct	Nov	Dec	Year
Mean daily maximum °C (°F)	28.5 (83.3)	29.1 (84.4)	28.1 (82.6)	24.2 (75.6)	21.1 (70.0)	18.6 (65.5)	18.6 (65.5)	19.9 (67.8)	21.9 (71.4)	24.4 (75.9)	26.1 (79.0)	28.1 (82.6)	24.1 (75.3)
Daily mean °C (°F)	19.2 (66.6)	19.1 (66.4)	17.1 (62.8)	14.1 (57.4)	12.0 (53.6)	9.2 (48.6)	8.9 (48.0)	10.1 (50.2)	12.7 (54.9)	14.5 (58.1)	16.4 (61.5)	18.1 (64.6)	14.3 (57.7)
Mean daily minimum °C (°F)	10.6 (51.1)	11.4 (52.5)	9.9 (49.8)	7.3 (45.1)	6.1 (43.0)	2.9 (37.2)	3.6 (38.5)	3.3 (37.9)	6.5 (43.7)	7.9 (46.2)	9.3 (48.7)	10.6 (51.1)	7.5 (45.4)
Average precipitation mm (inches)	0.0 (0.0)	1.1 (0.04)	0.3 (0.01)	30.8 (1.21)	76.0 (2.99)	96.4 (3.80)	79.2 (3.12)	65.3 (2.57)	20.9 (0.82)	12.5 (0.49)	4.7 (0.19)	0.0 (0.0)	387.2 (15.24)
Average relative humidity (%)	61	64	69	74	78	78	78	76	72	65	58	59	69
Source: Bioclimatografia de Chile

== Transportation ==
=== Access routes ===
Llay-Llay has a strategic location within the Santiago–Valparaíso macro-region. It is situated 85 km from downtown Santiago via Route 5 North, 70 km from the Quilicura industrial district, and 65 km from that industrial area to the Llay-Llay industrial park along the same highway.

These distances have been reduced in travel time and improved in safety thanks to the expansion of Route 5 North, which allows fast and smooth transit to and from Santiago. The commune is located 92 km from the city of Valparaíso (the regional capital) via the international highway, 32 km from San Felipe, and 300 km from Mendoza, Argentina.

Along Route 5 North, the southern entrance to Llay-Llay begins at kilometer 66 (La Cumbre) and the commune ends at the eastern mouth of the short La Calavera Tunnel, around kilometer 94. In addition, there is a highway toll plaza in Las Vegas, 89 km from Santiago.

=== Railway ===
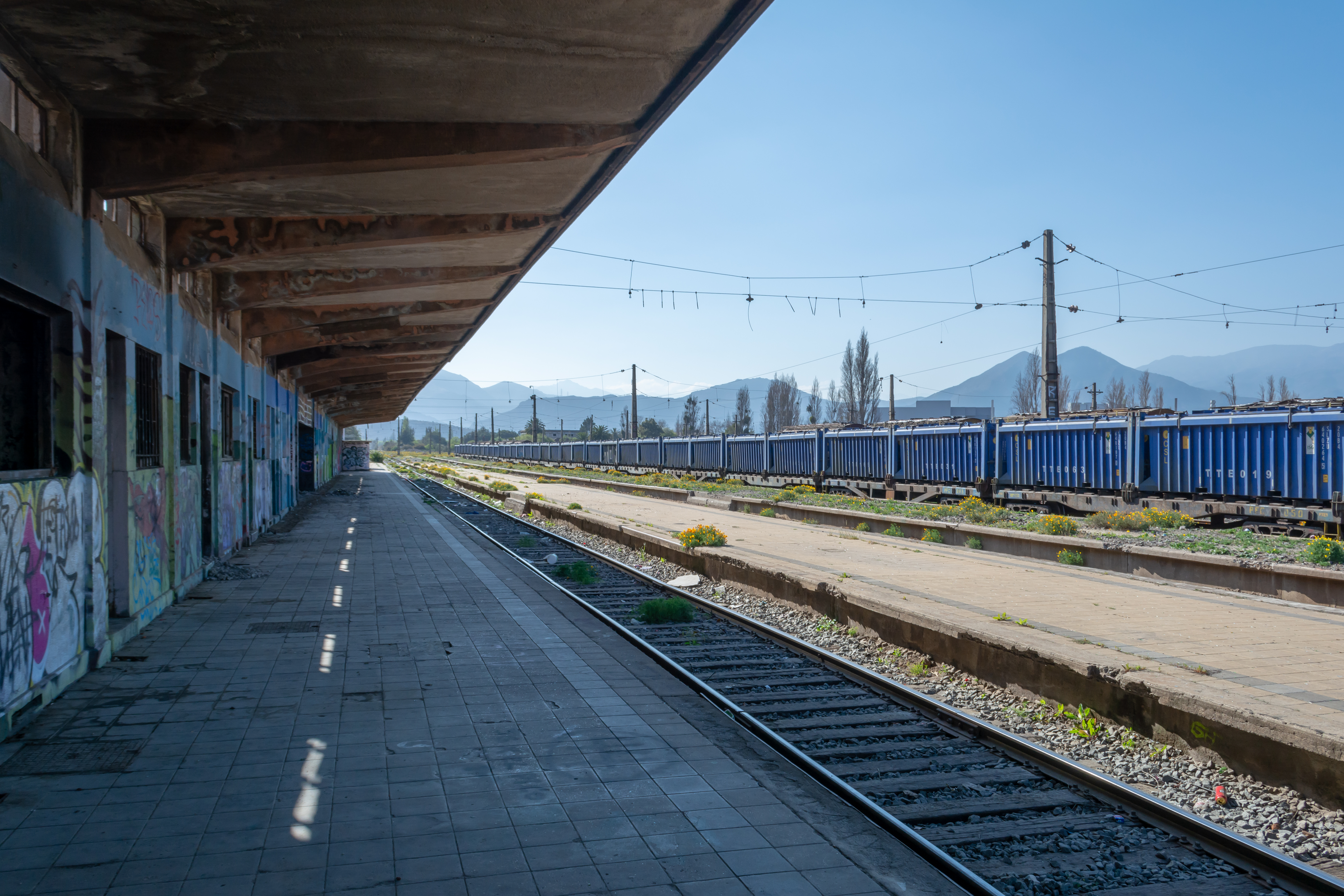
Llay-Llay Station (2021)

The train played an important role in Llay-Llay’s history. In its early days, the commune experienced significant growth thanks to the railway passing through it, becoming an important rail hub due to the presence of Llay-Llay Station.

Over time, however, rail services in the area declined and eventually ceased, affecting local dynamics. Recently, plans have been announced to revive railway services in Llay-Llay. These include the possible extension of the Santiago–Batuco train service and the Santiago–Valparaíso train project promoted by President Gabriel Boric.

Other stations in the commune include Enrique Meiggs Station, Las Vegas Station, and Los Loros Station.
