= San Esteban, Chile =

San Esteban
- City and Commune
- Coat of arms Location in Chile
- Coordinates: 32°47′57″S 70°34′49″W
- Country: Chile
- Region: Valparaíso
- Province: Los Andes

Government
  - Type: Municipality
  - Alcalde: Christian Ortega Villagras (Ind.)

Area
  - Total: 1,361.6 km^{2} (525.7 sq mi)
- Elevation: 831 m (2,726 ft)

Population (2012 Census)
  - Total: 17,090
  - Density: 12.55/km^{2} (32.51/sq mi)
  - Urban: 7,542
  - Rural: 6,858

Sex
  - Men: 7,298
  - Women: 7,102
- Time zone: UTC-4 (CLT)
  - Summer (DST): UTC-3 (CLST)
- Area code: 56 + 34
- Website: Municipality of San Esteban

San Esteban ("St. Stephen" in Spanish) is a city and commune in the Los Andes Province of central Chile's Valparaíso Region. The commune spans an area of 1,361.6 km^{2} (526 sq mi).

== Demographics ==
According to the 2002 census of the National Statistics Institute, San Esteban spans an area of 1,361.6 km^{2} (526 sq mi) and has 14,400 inhabitants (7,298 men and 7,102 women). Of these, 7,542 (52.4%) lived in urban areas and 6,858 (47.6%) in rural areas. The population grew by 18.5% (2,247 persons) between the 1992 and 2002 censuses.

== Administration ==
As a commune, San Esteban is a third-level administrative division of Chile administered by a municipal council, headed by an alcalde who is directly elected every four years. The 2008-2012 alcalde is René Mardones Valencia (Ind.).

- Julio Figueroa Contreras
- Geovanna Serey Lizana
- Gabriel Bianchini Frost
- Julio Contreras Tapia
- Alejo Rodriguez Toledo
- Benjamin Olguin Cáceres

Within the electoral divisions of Chile, San Esteban is represented in the Chamber of Deputies by Marco Antonio Núñez (PDC) and Gaspar Rivas (RN) as part of the 11th electoral district, (together with Los Andes, Calle Larga, Rinconada, San Felipe, Putaendo, Santa María, Panquehue, Llaillay and Catemu). The commune is represented in the Senate by Ignacio Walker Prieto (PDC) and Lily Pérez San Martín (RN) as part of the 5th senatorial constituency (Valparaíso-Cordillera).
