= Catemu =

- City and Commune
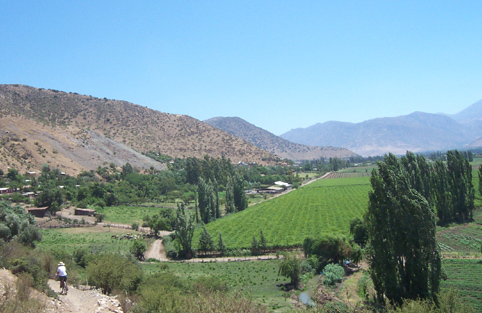
- Catemu commune

- Location in Chile
- Coordinates: 32°52′58″S 70°38′54″W
- Country: Chile
- Region: Valparaíso
- Province: San Felipe de Aconcagua

Government
  - Type: Municipality
  - Alcalde: Rodrigo Diaz Brito

Area
  - Total: 361.6 km^{2} (139.6 sq mi)
- Elevation: 768 m (2,520 ft)

Population (2012 Census)
  - Total: 13,285
  - Density: 36.74/km^{2} (95.15/sq mi)
  - Urban: 6,706
  - Rural: 5,406

Sex
  - Men: 6,172
  - Women: 5,940
- Time zone: UTC-4 (CLT)
  - Summer (DST): UTC-3 (CLST)
- Area code: 56 + 34
- Website: Municipality of Catemu

Catemu is a city and commune in the San Felipe de Aconcagua Province of central Chile's Valparaíso Region.

== Geography ==
Catemu spans an area of 361.6 km^{2} (140 sq mi).

== Demographics ==
According to data from the 2002 Census of Population and Housing, the Catemu commune had 12,112 inhabitants; of these, 6,706 (55.4%) lived in urban areas and 5,406 (44.6%) in rural areas. At that time, there were 6,172 men and 5,940 women. The population grew by 7.2% (817 persons) between the 1992 and 2002 censuses.

== Administration ==
As a commune, Catemu is a third-level administrative division of Chile, administered by a communal council (consejo comunal), which is headed by a directly elected alcalde. The current alcalde is Boris Luksic Nieto. The communal council has the following members:

- María Salas Herrera
- Pablo Pacheco Delgado
- Aurora Medina Carvajal
- Luís René Carvajal Leiva
- Claudio Núñez Cataldo
- María Sánchez Contreas

Within the electoral divisions of Chile, Catemu is represented in the Chamber of Deputies by Marco Antonio Núñez (PDC) and Gaspar Rivas (RN) as part of the 11th electoral district, together with Los Andes, San Esteban, Calle Larga, Rinconada, San Felipe, Putaendo, Santa María, Panquehue and Llaillay. The commune is represented in the Senate by Ignacio Walker Prieto (PDC) and Lily Pérez San Martín (RN) as part of the 5th senatorial constituency (Valparaíso-Cordillera).

== Notable people ==
- Olga Lehmann (1912–2001), visual artist born in Catemu
- Monica Pidgeon (1913–2009), interior designer born in Catemu
