= Santa María, Chile =

Santa María
- City and Commune
- Location in Chile
- Coordinates: 32°44′49″S 70°39′35″W
- Country: Chile
- Region: Valparaíso
- Province: San Felipe de Aconcagua

Government
  - Type: Municipality
  - Alcalde: Claudio Zurita Ibarra (PPD)

Area
  - Total: 166.3 km^{2} (64.2 sq mi)
- Elevation: 699 m (2,293 ft)

Population (2012 Census)
  - Total: 14,452
  - Density: 86.90/km^{2} (225.1/sq mi)
  - Urban: 8,126
  - Rural: 4,687

Sex
  - Men: 6,427
  - Women: 6,386
- Time zone: UTC-4 (CLT)
  - Summer (DST): UTC-3 (CLST)
- Area code: country 56 +city 34
- Website: Municipality of Santa María

Santa María ("St. Mary" in Spanish) is a city and commune in the San Felipe de Aconcagua Province of central Chile's Valparaíso Region.

== Geography ==
Santa María spans an area of 166.3 km^{2} (64 sq mi).

== Demographics ==
According to the 2002 census of the National Statistics Institute, Santa María has 12,813 inhabitants (6,427 men and 6,386 women). Of these, 8,126 (63.4%) lived in urban areas and 4,687 (36.6%) in rural areas. The population grew by 10.7% (1,238 persons) between the 1992 and 2002 censuses.

== Administration ==
As a commune, Santa María is a third-level administrative division of Chile, administered by a communal council (consejo comunal), which is headed by a directly elected alcalde. The current alcalde is Claudio Zurita Ibarra (PPD). The communal council has the following members:

- José Grbic Bernal (RN)
- María Cristina Meza Espinoza (PPD)
- Marisol Ponce Cisterna (UDI)
- David Olguín Vargas (PS)
- Eloy Ibacache González (PPD)
- Nelson Lemus Osorio (DC)

Within the electoral divisions of Chile, Santa María is represented in the Chamber of Deputies by Marco Antonio Núñez (PDC) and Gaspar Rivas (RN) as part of the 11th electoral district, together with Los Andes, San Esteban, Calle Larga, Rinconada, San Felipe, Putaendo, Panquehue, Llaillay and Catemu. The commune is represented in the Senate by Ignacio Walker Prieto (PDC) and Lily Pérez San Martín (RN) as part of the 5th senatorial constituency (Valparaíso-Cordillera).

== Climate ==
Climate data for Jahuel (Banos de Jahuel), elevation 1,180 m (3,870 ft)
Month	Jan	Feb	Mar	Apr	May	Jun	Jul	Aug	Sep	Oct	Nov	Dec	Year
Mean daily maximum °C (°F)	30.7 (87.3)	30.3 (86.5)	28.4 (83.1)	25.3 (77.5)	19.3 (66.7)	15.4 (59.7)	16.2 (61.2)	17.5 (63.5)	18.6 (65.5)	22.9 (73.2)	26.2 (79.2)	29.1 (84.4)	23.3 (74.0)
Daily mean °C (°F)	22.0 (71.6)	21.1 (70.0)	19.1 (66.4)	16.5 (61.7)	12.8 (55.0)	9.9 (49.8)	10.1 (50.2)	10.7 (51.3)	11.9 (53.4)	14.9 (58.8)	17.6 (63.7)	20.6 (69.1)	15.6 (60.1)
Mean daily minimum °C (°F)	14.7 (58.5)	14.3 (57.7)	12.4 (54.3)	10.5 (50.9)	8.1 (46.6)	5.7 (42.3)	5.8 (42.4)	5.9 (42.6)	6.3 (43.3)	8.7 (47.7)	10.6 (51.1)	13.0 (55.4)	9.7 (49.4)
Average precipitation mm (inches)	3.7 (0.15)	5.8 (0.23)	3.8 (0.15)	3.4 (0.13)	49.5 (1.95)	90.9 (3.58)	52.6 (2.07)	50.0 (1.97)	26.9 (1.06)	11.7 (0.46)	5.5 (0.22)	1.6 (0.06)	305.4 (12.03)
Average relative humidity (%)	54	54	56	59	60	62	60	64	65	62	62	59	60
Source: Bioclimatografia de Chile
