= Putaendo =

- City and Commune
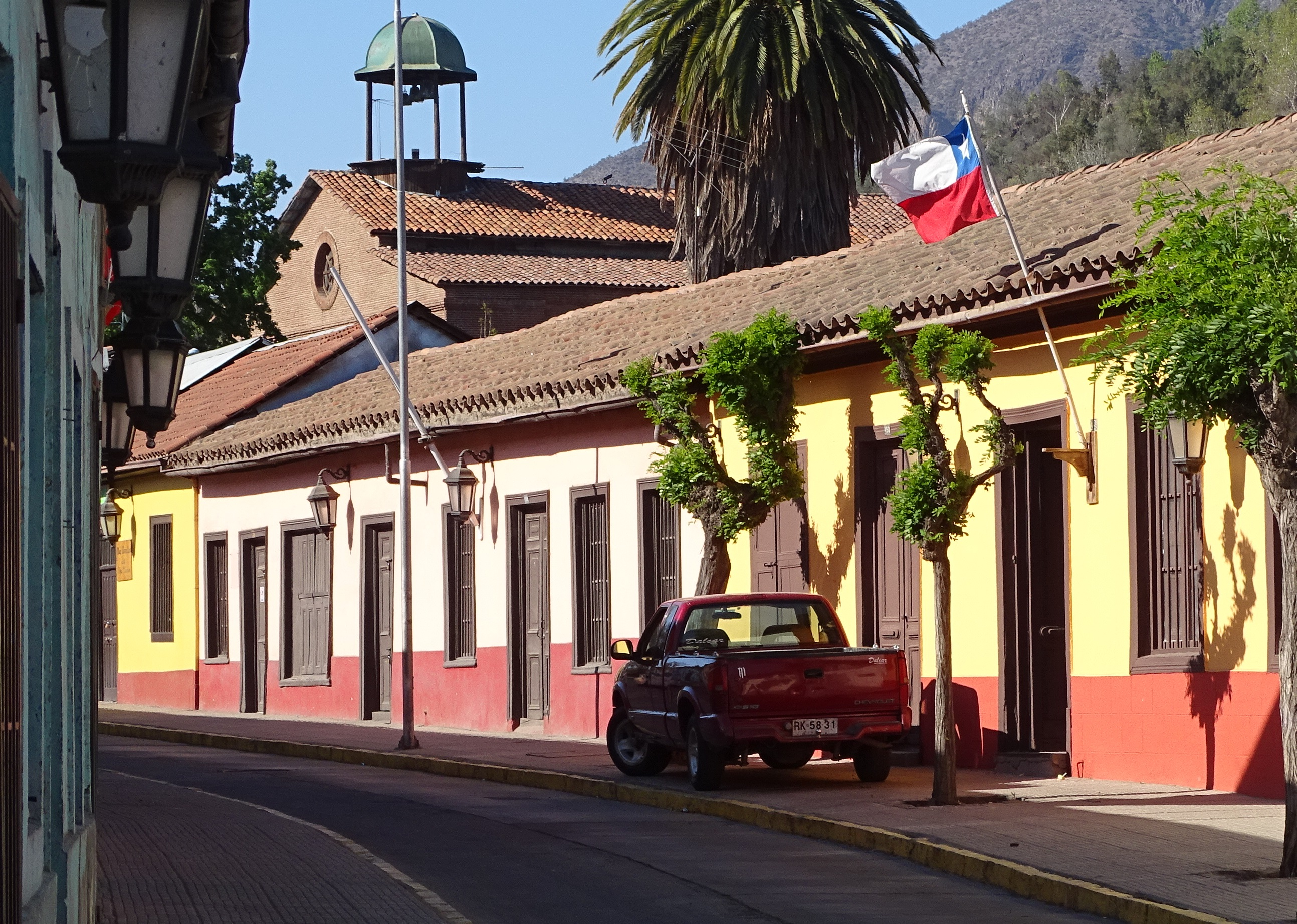

- Coat of arms Location in Chile
- Coordinates: 32°37′40″S 70°43′00″W
- Country: Chile
- Region: Valparaíso
- Province: San Felipe de Aconcagua
- San Antonio de Padua de la Unión de Putaendo: 20 March 1831

Government
  - Type: Municipality
  - Alcalde: Guillermo Reyes

Area
  - Total: 1,474.4 km^{2} (569.3 sq mi)
- Elevation: 813 m (2,667 ft)

Population (2012 Census)
  - Total: 15,361
  - Density: 10.418/km^{2} (26.984/sq mi)
  - Urban: 7,214
  - Rural: 7,435
- Demonym: Putaendino

Sex
  - Men: 7,344
  - Women: 7,305
- Time zone: UTC-4 (CLT)
  - Summer (DST): UTC-3 (CLST)
- Area code: country 56 + city 34
- Website: Municipality of Putaendo

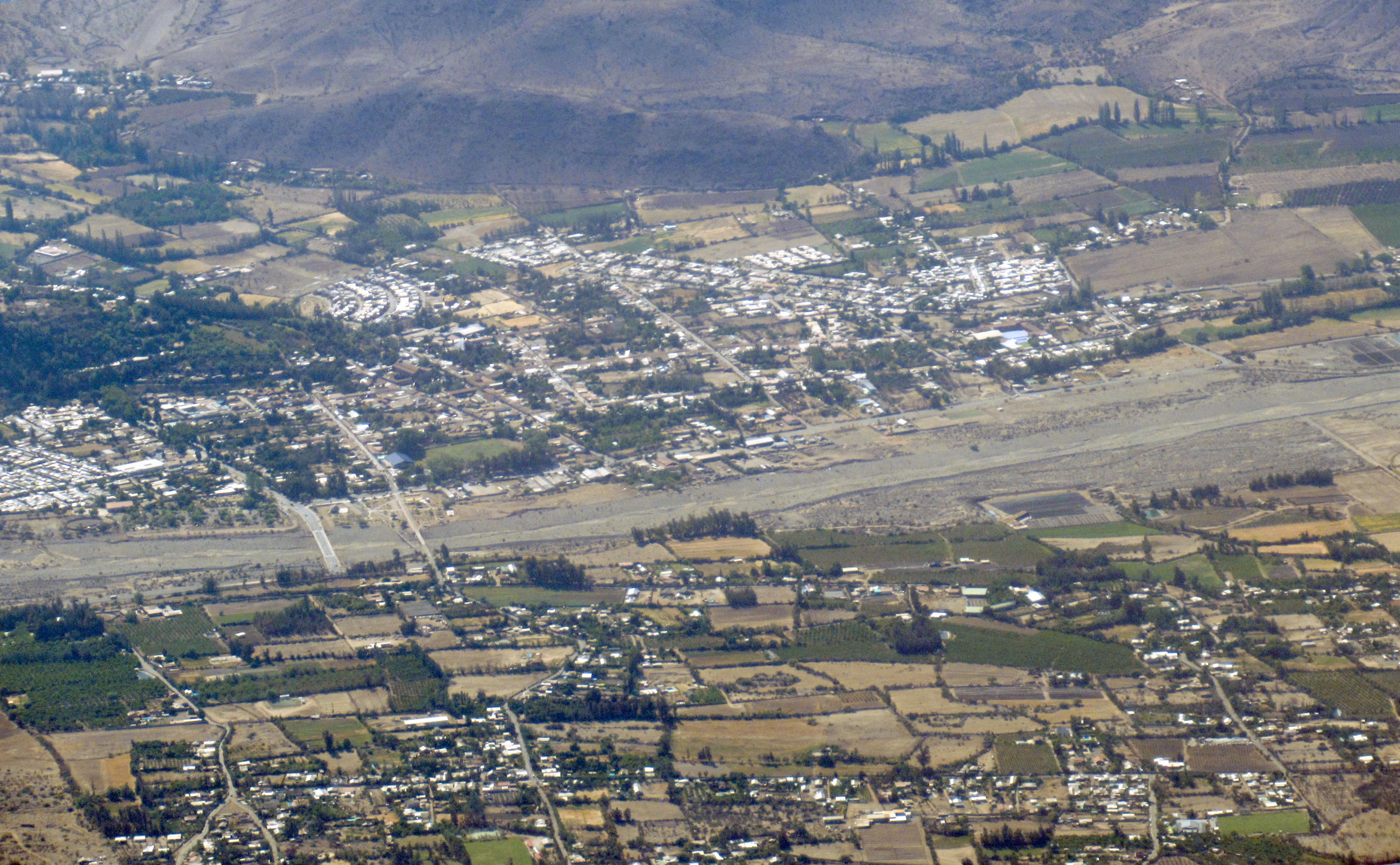
Putaendo

Putaendo is a city and commune in the San Felipe de Aconcagua Province of central Chile's Valparaíso Region.

== History ==
Before the arrival of the Spanish conquistadors, Putaendo was a very old town of hunters and gatherers. The Spanish were attracted to gold mines discovered in the outskirts of town in the mid 18th century. Little by little, they formed a population center and constructed the Church of San Antonio. On 20 March 1831, the Assembly of Aconcagua granted the town a title. San Antonio de la Unión de Putaendo was the first town to become a patriotic force in 1817.

In 1485, during the conquest of the Inca Túpac Yupanqui, his son Huayna Cápac crossed the Andean mountains and descended through this valley, camping in Putaendo and incorporating the Aconcagua valley into the Incan civilization. The advancing expedition of Diego de Almagro was stopped here in 1536. The Inca road system (Camino del inca) passed through this valley. This was the fastest route between the tribes of the valleys of La Ligua, Aconcagua and Mapocho.

The outline of the city extends longitudinally from north to south, and its historic center has been called "Typical Zone" (Zona Típica). Toward the south, there is a commercial area, structured in the form of Calle Larga, with adobe facades from the 18th and 19th centuries. In the extreme north, there is a plaza with large trees, and on either side of town, public buildings can be found.

== Geography ==
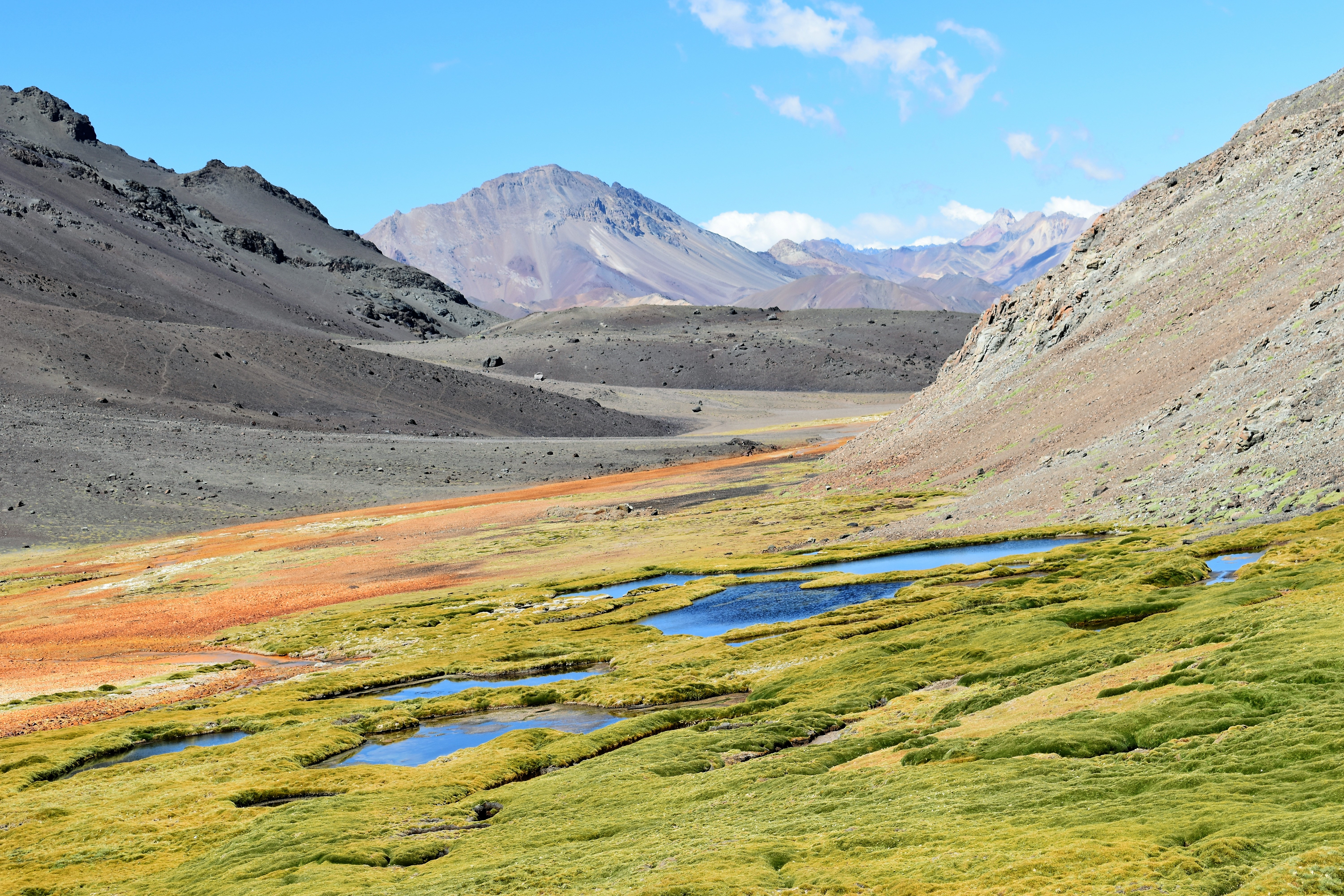
Chilon river.

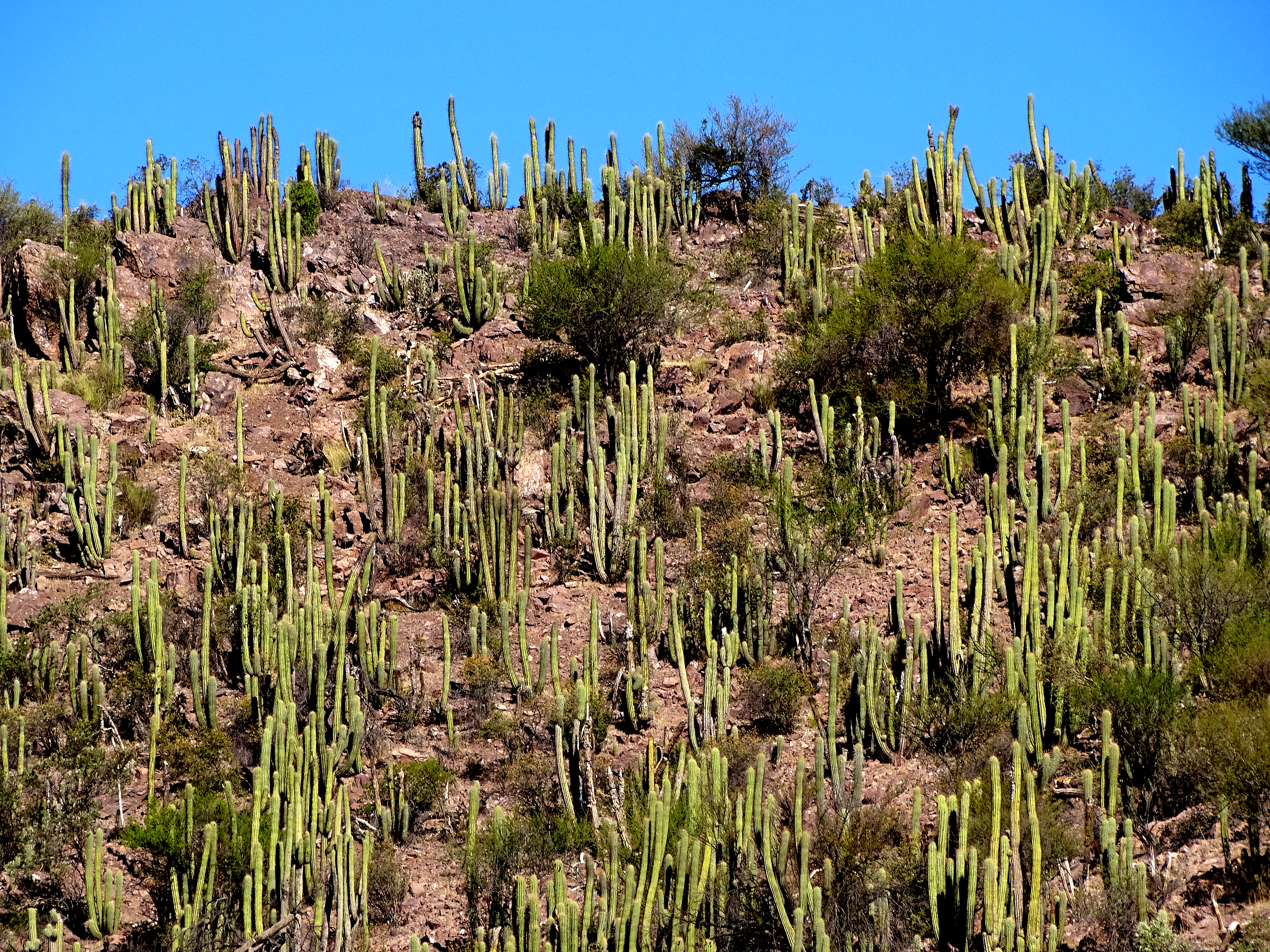
Cactuses in Putaendo.

The Putaendo river valley is located in the northern Zona Central and is a part of the Aconcagua river watershed located in the transitional zone, with respect to geomorphology (transitioning from the Norte Chico to the longitudinal Chilean Central Valley) and climatology (from semiarid to a temperate Mediterranean). Putaendo spans an area of 1,474.4 km^{2} (569 sq mi).

== Demographics ==
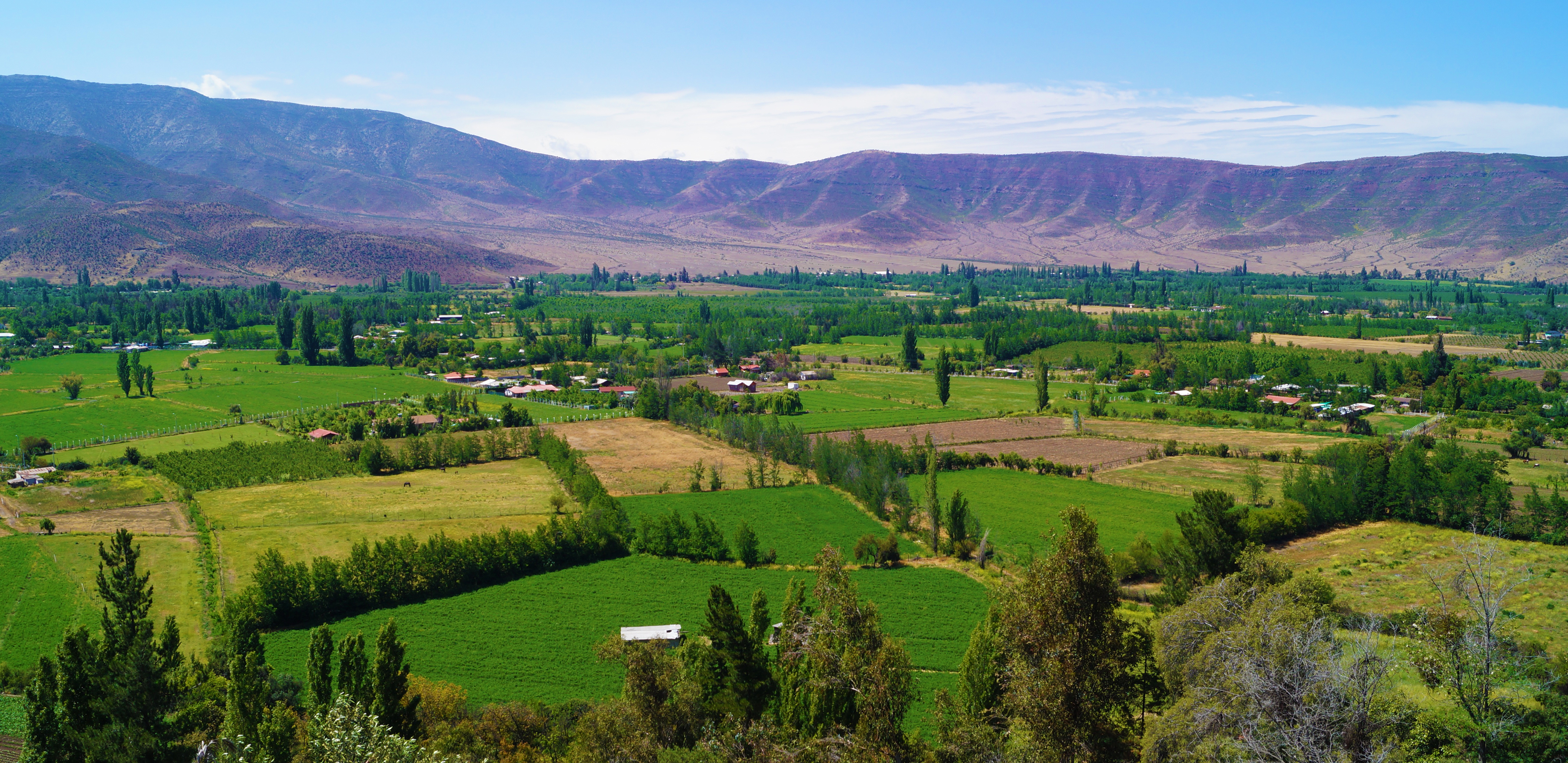
Rinconada de Silva, rural area in Putaendo.

According to the 2002 census of the National Statistics Institute, Putaendo spans an area of 1,474.4 km^{2} (569 sq mi) and has 14,649 inhabitants (7,344 men and 7,305 women). Of these, 7,214 (49.2%) lived in urban areas and 7,435 (50.8%) in rural areas. The population grew by 14.4% (1,843 persons) between the 1992 and 2002 censuses.

== Economy ==
In 2018, the number of companies registered in Internal Revenue Service of Chile for Putaendo was 304. The Economic Complexity Index (ECI) in the same year was -0.32, while the economic activity with the highest comparative advantage index revealed (RCA) were the cultivation of aromatic or medicinal plants (169.37).

== Administration ==
As a commune, Putaendo is a third-level administrative division of Chile, administered by a municipal council, which is headed by a directly elected alcalde. The current alcalde is Guillermo Reyes. The council has the following members:

- Silvia Arancibia Abarca
- Laya Nara Negrete
- Julio Aravena
- Enzo Gazzolo
- Manuel Olivares Leiva
- Sergio Zamora

Within the electoral divisions of Chile, Putaendo is represented in the Chamber of Deputies by Marco Antonio Núñez (PDC) and Gaspar Rivas (RN) as part of the 11th electoral district, together with Los Andes, San Esteban, Calle Larga, Rinconada, San Felipe, Santa María, Panquehue, Llaillay and Catemu. The commune is represented in the Senate by Ignacio Walker Prieto (PDC) and Lily Pérez San Martín (RN) as part of the 5th senatorial constituency (Valparaíso-Cordillera).
