= Calle Larga =

- City and Commune
- Coat of arms Location in Chile
- Coordinates: 32°52′59″S 70°38′55″W
- Country: Chile
- Region: Valparaíso
- Province: Los Andes

Government
  - Type: Municipality
  - Alcalde: Dina González (PS)

Area
  - Total: 321.7 km^{2} (124.2 sq mi)
  - Rank: 2
- Elevation: 768 m (2,520 ft)

Population (2012 Census)
  - Total: 13,366
  - Density: 41.55/km^{2} (107.6/sq mi)
  - Urban: 5,447
  - Rural: 4,946

Sex
  - Men: 5,351
  - Women: 5,042
- Time zone: UTC-4 (CLT)
  - Summer (DST): UTC-3 (CLST)
- Area code: 56 + 34
- Website: Municipality of Calle Larga

Calle Larga ("long road" in Spanish) is a city and one of four communes in the Los Andes Province of central Chile's Valparaíso Region.

== Administration ==
As a commune, Calle Larga is a third-level administrative division of Chile, administered by a municipal council, headed by a directly elected alcalde, every four years. The 2008-2012 alcalde is Nelson Esteban Venegas Salazar, and the council has the following councilors:

- Ruth Sabina Guerra Guzmán (PDC)
- Víctor Manuel Jara Lopez (PRSD)
- Manuel Amar Amar (RN)
- Luis Alberto Gormas Pfeng (UDI)
- José Francisco Leiva Muñoz (PH)
- Carls Patricio Izquierdo Llanos (PDC)

Within the electoral divisions of Chile, Calle Larga is represented in the Chamber of Deputies as a part of the 11th electoral district (together with Los Andes, San Esteban, San Ignacio, Rinconada, San Felipe, Putaendo, Santa María, Panquehue, Llaillay, Catemu). The commune is represented in the Senate as part of the 5th senatorial constituency (Valparaíso-Cordillera).

== Geography ==
Calle Larga spans an area of 321.7 km^{2} (124 sq mi). The commune is bordered to the west by the commune of Rinconada, to the north and east by the commune of Los Andes and to the south by the Colina commune of the Santiago Metropolitan Region.

== Demographics ==
According to data from the 2002 Census of Population and Housing, the Calle Larga commune had 10,393 inhabitants; of these, 5,447 (52.4%) lived in urban areas and 4,946 (47.6%) in rural areas. At that time, there were 5,351 men and 5,042 women.
