= Valparaíso Region =

Region of Chile

Valparaíso Region Región de Valparaíso
- Region of Chile
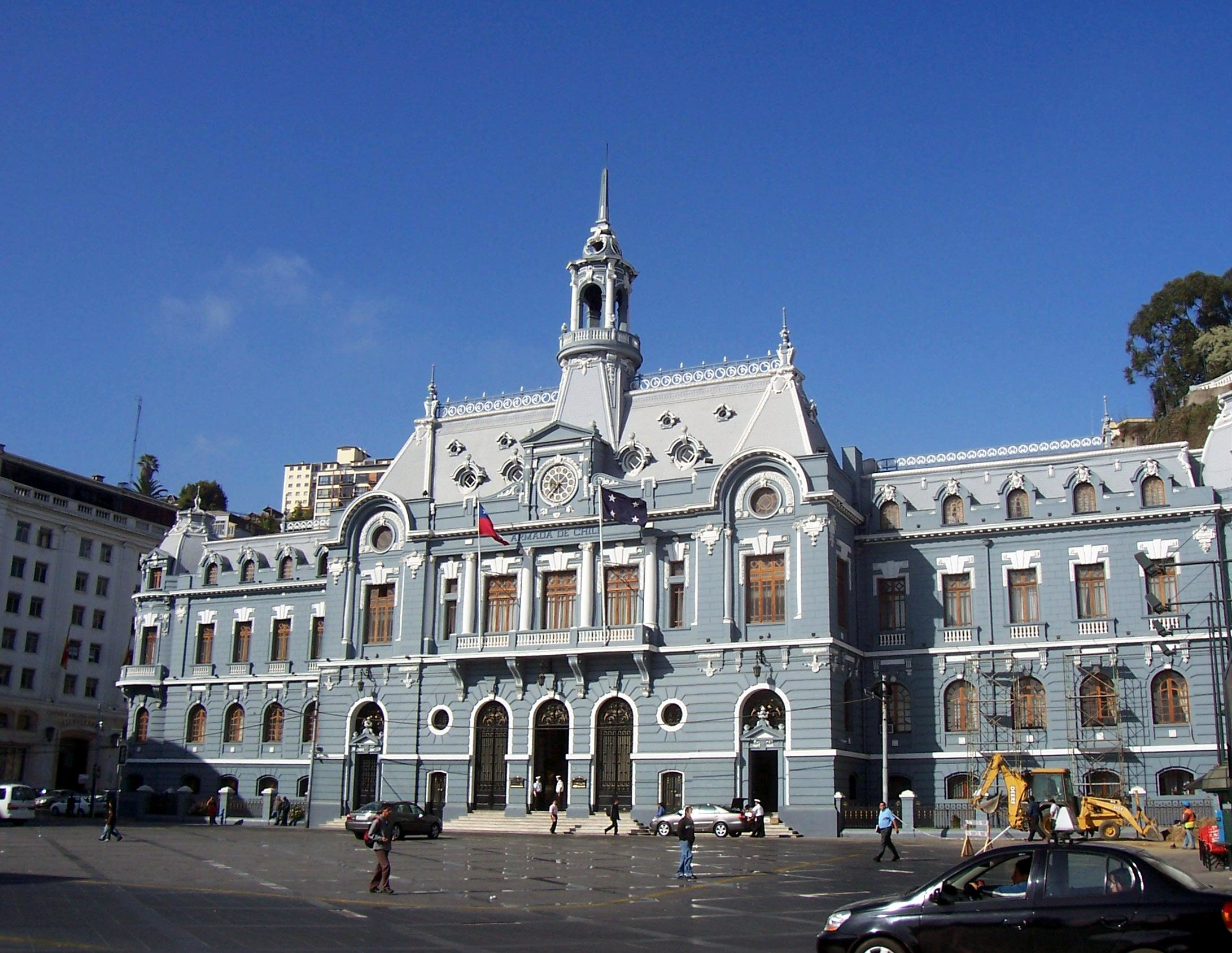
- The Edificio Armada de Chile

- Flag Seal Coat of arms

- Map of Valparaíso Region
- Coordinates: 33°02′36″S 71°37′26″W
- Country: Chile
- Named for: Valparaíso de Arriba, Spain
- Capital: Valparaíso
- Provinces: Petorca, Los Andes, San Felipe de Aconcagua, Quillota, Quilpué, Valparaíso, San Antonio, Isla de Pascua

Government
  - Governor: Rodrigo Mundaca (FA)
  - Presidential delegate: Manuel Millones (Ind)

Area
  - Total: 16,396.1 km^{2} (6,330.6 sq mi)
  - Rank: 13
- Lowest elevation: 0 m (0 ft)

Population (2024 census)
  - Total: 1,896,053
  - Rank: 2nd
  - Density: 115.640/km^{2} (299.507/sq mi)

GDP (PPP)
  - Total: $30.758 billion (2014)
  - Per capita: $17,009 (2014)
- ISO 3166 code: CL-VS
- HDI (2023): 0.894 very high
- Website: Official website (in Spanish)

The Valparaíso Region (Spanish: Región de Valparaíso, pronounced [valpaɾaˈiso]) is one of Chile's 16 first order administrative divisions. (Note: Valparaíso Region, 2006) With the country's second-highest population of 1,896,053 as of 2024, and fourth-smallest area of 16,396.1 km^{2} (6,331 sq mi), the region is Chile's second most densely populated after the Santiago Metropolitan Region to the southeast. The region also includes Chile's remote islands of the Pacific Ocean, including Rapa Nui and the Juan Fernandez Islands.

Its capital is the port city of Valparaíso; other important cities include Viña del Mar, Quillota, San Felipe, Quilpué, Villa Alemana, and San Antonio.

== Administration ==
As a region, Valparaíso is a first-level administrative division. Since 2021, the region is governed by the governor, who is elected by popular vote. The current governor is Rodrigo Mundaca (Broad Front). The Presidential Delegate has been Manuel Millones (Independent) since 11 March 2026.

== Geography ==
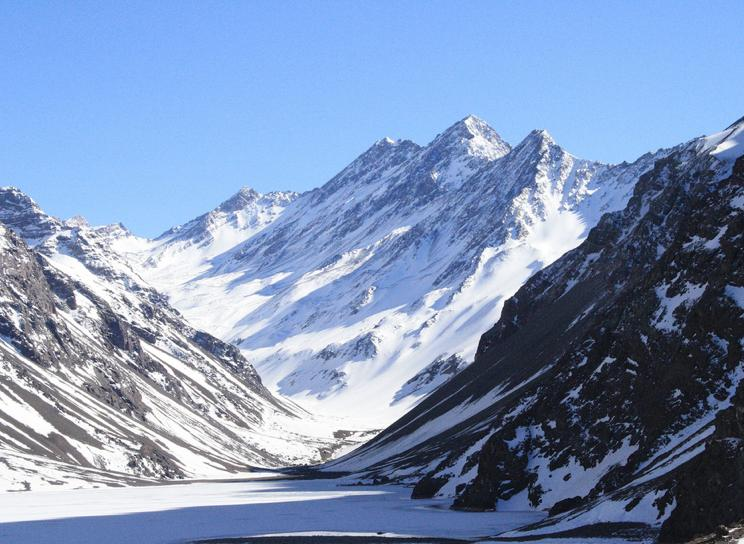
Nevado Juncal.

The region is on the same latitude as the Santiago Metropolitan Region. Its capital is Valparaíso, which is the site for the National Congress of Chile and an important commercial port. Also in this region is the top resort city of Viña del Mar. Additionally, the Pacific islands of Easter Island, Isla Salas y Gómez, the Juan Fernández Islands and the Desventuradas Islands fall under the Valparaíso Region's administration.

The Valparaíso Region is part of the restricted range of the endangered Chilean wine palm (Jubaea chilensis); in prehistoric times, this endemic Chilean tree had a significantly larger range. (Note: C. Michael Hogan, 2008)

== Demographics ==
The Valparaíso Region is populated by 1.89 million inhabitants. The population density reached 94.1 inhabitants/km^{2}. 91.6% of the population lives in urban areas and only 8.4% of the population lives in rural areas.

The most populous municipalities in the region are Valparaíso, with 308,000 inhabitants and Viña del Mar, with 287,000 inhabitants, which together with Villa Alemana, Quilpué and Concón form the Greater Valparaíso, a continuum of 1.75 million people. There are also Quillota, with about 201,000 inhabitants and San Antonio with more than 200,000 inhabitants with estimates at 250,000 to be the region's second-largest city.

=== Immigration and culture ===
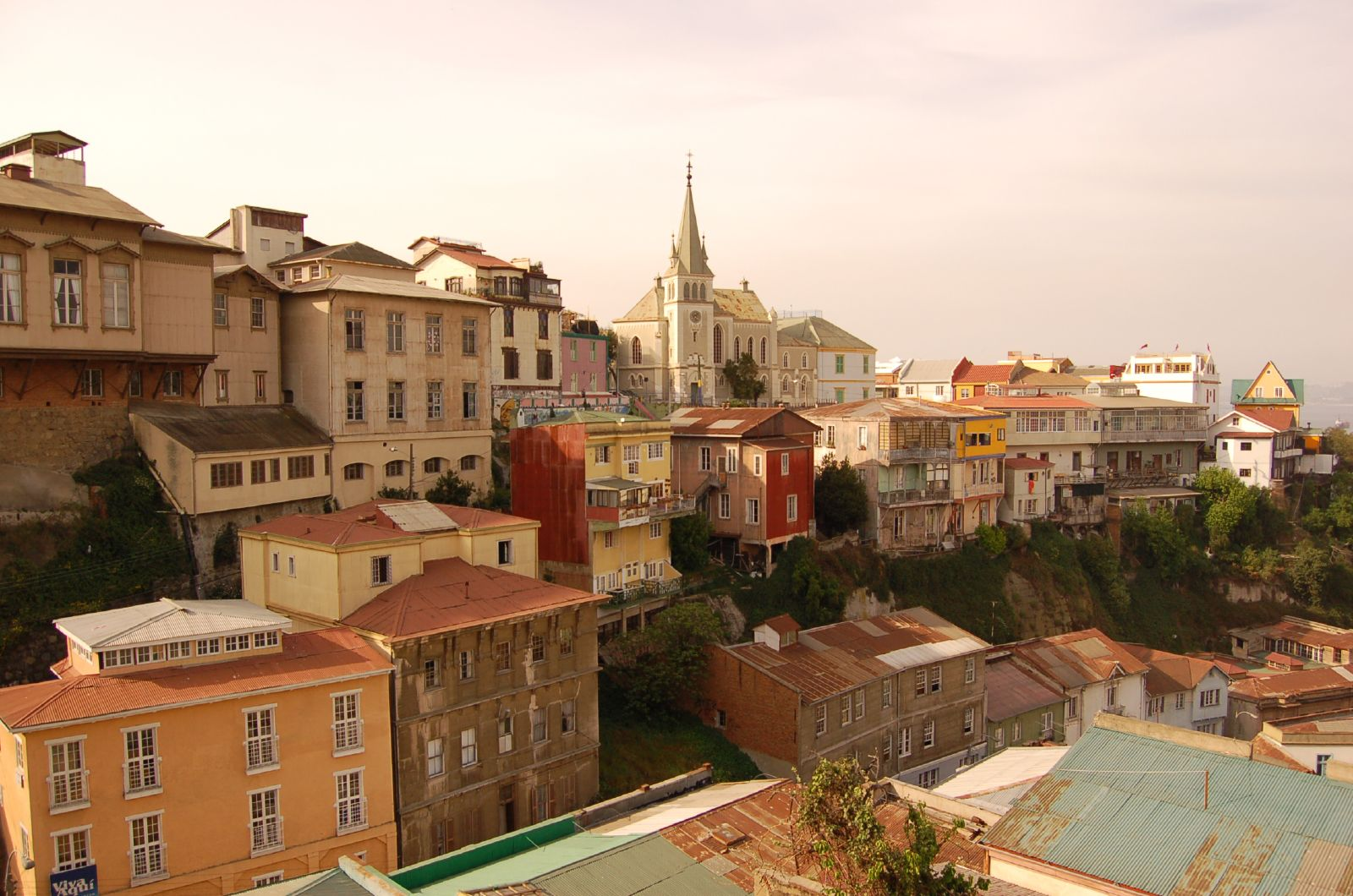
Hills in Valparaiso.

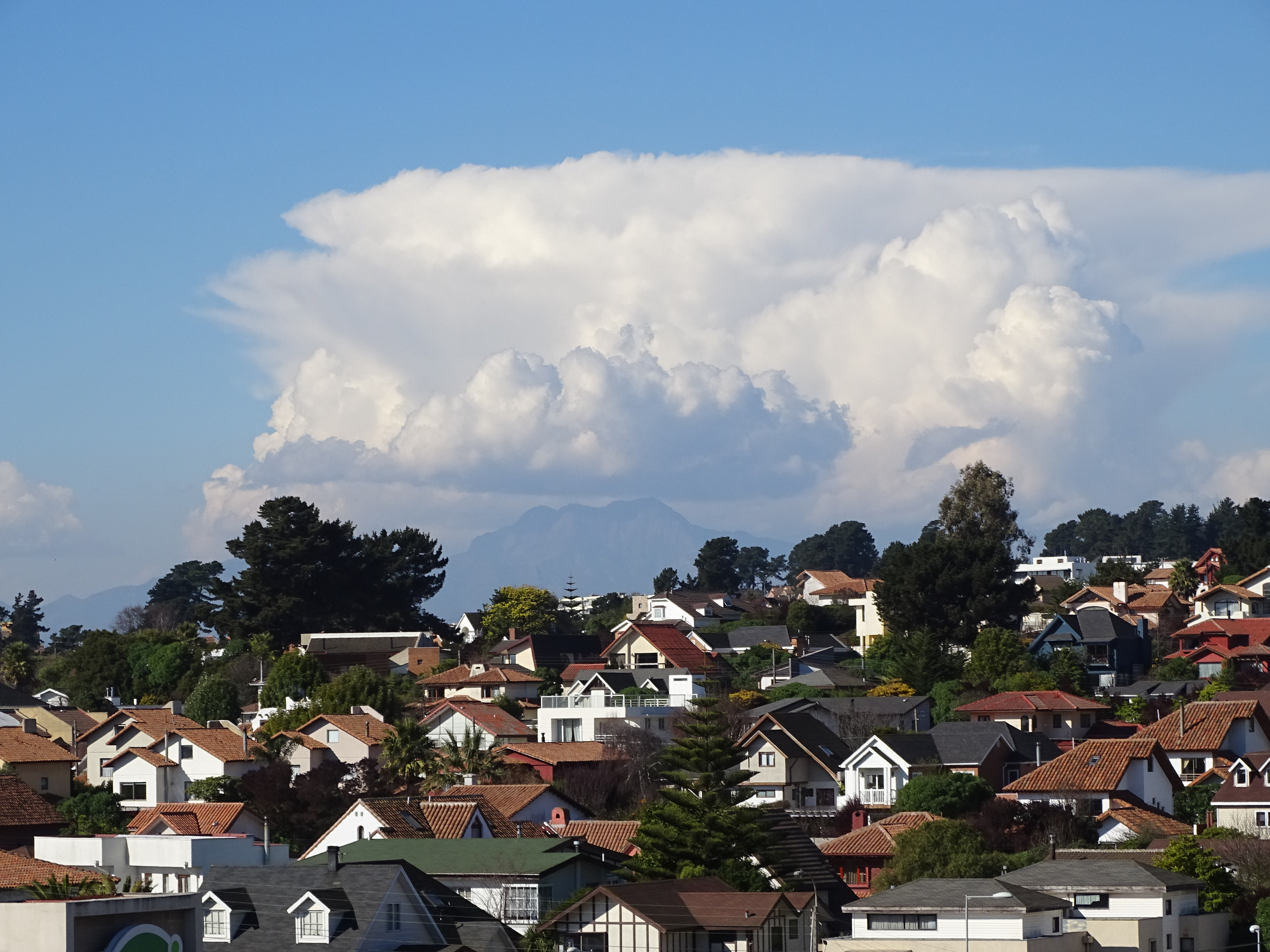
Bosques de Montemar, Concón.

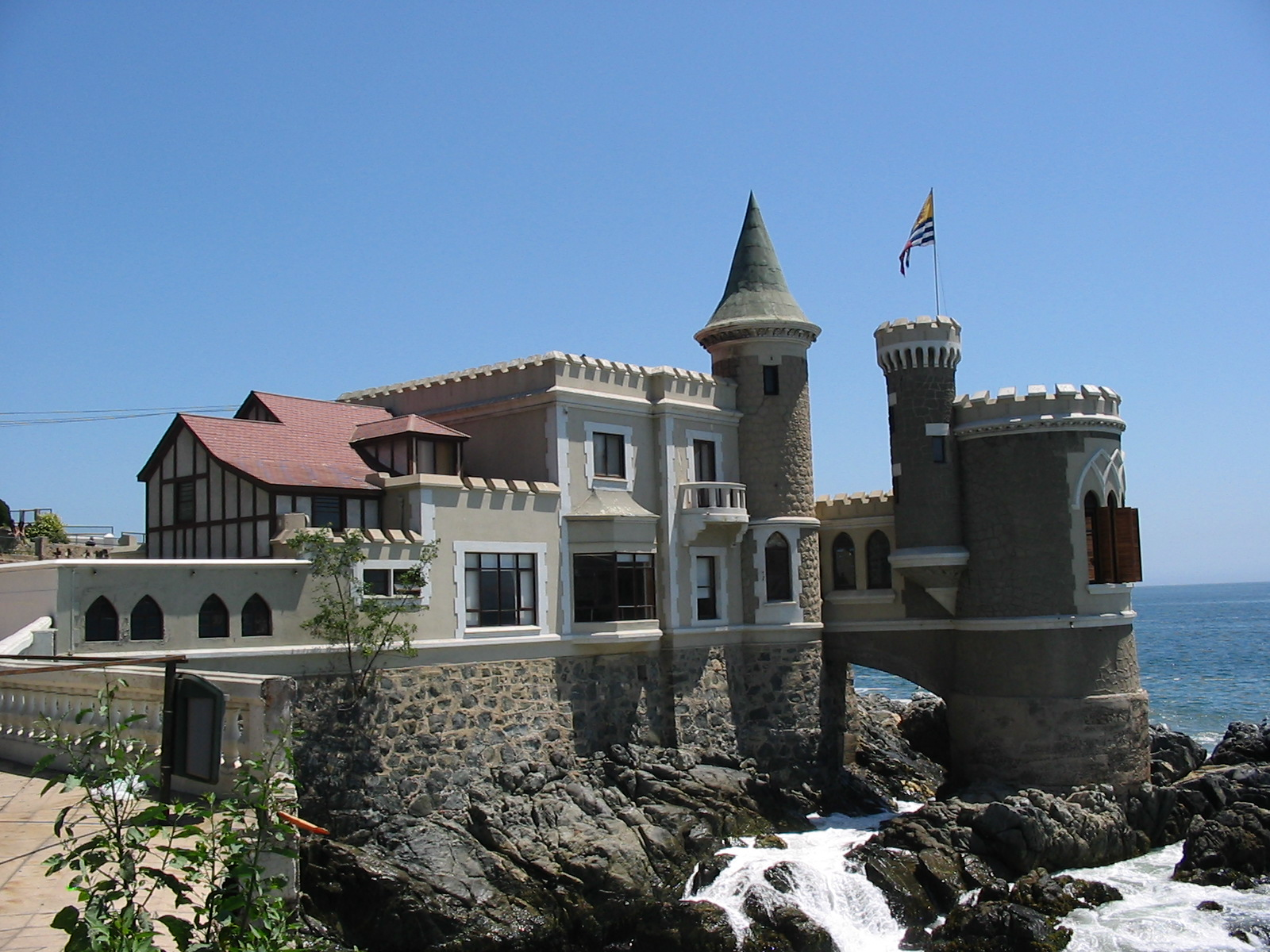
Viña del Mar.

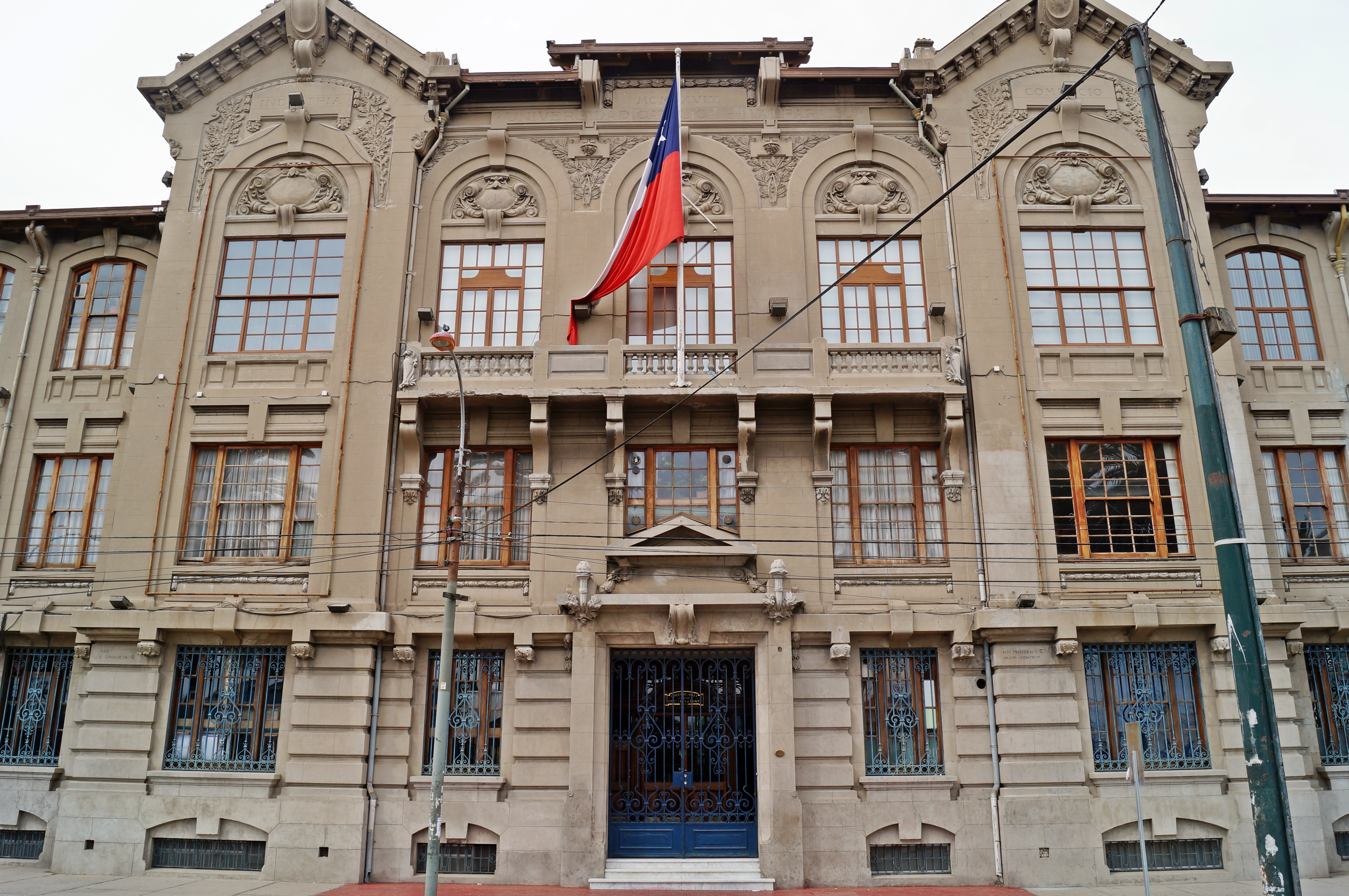
Pontifical Catholic University of Valparaíso.

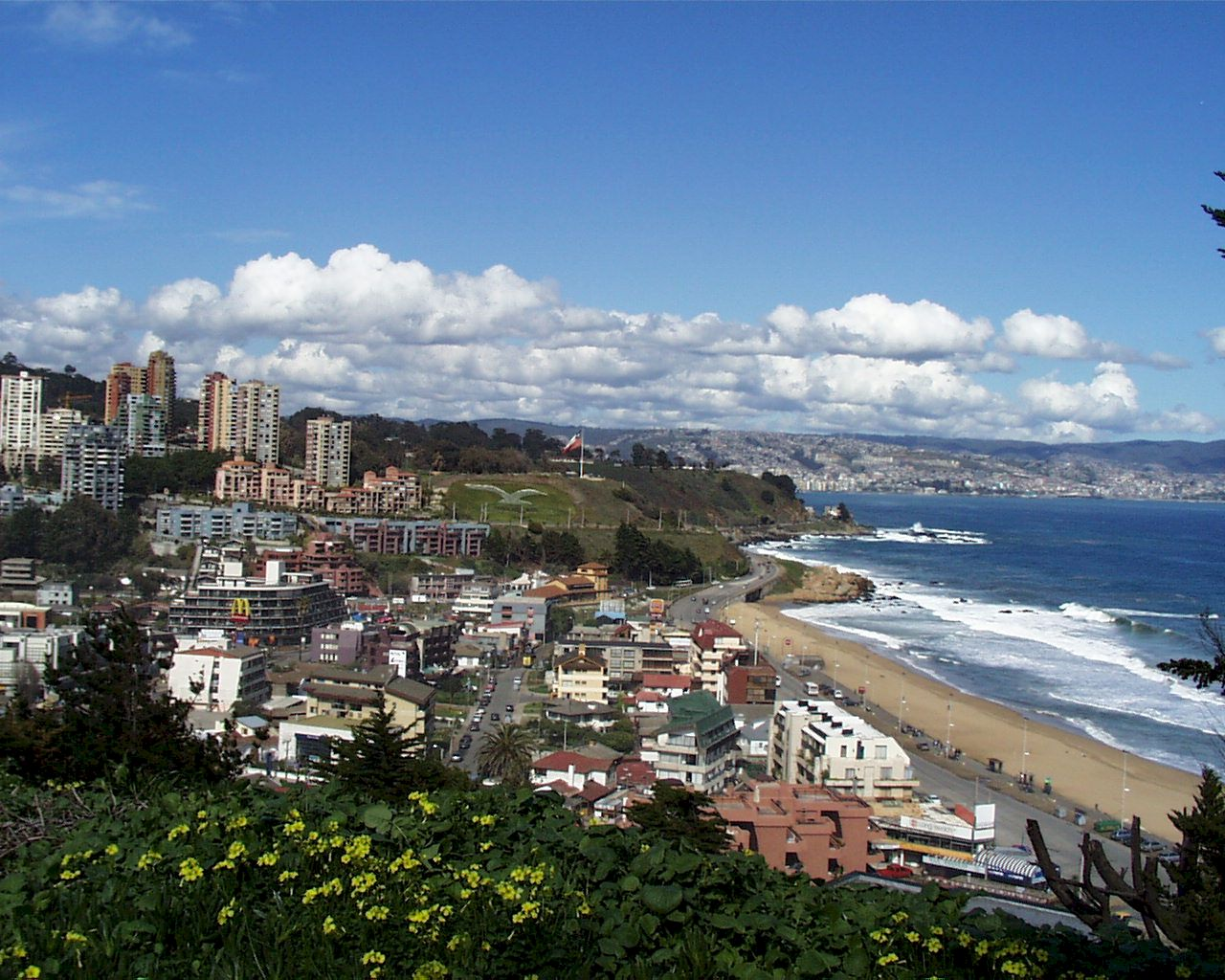
Reñaca.

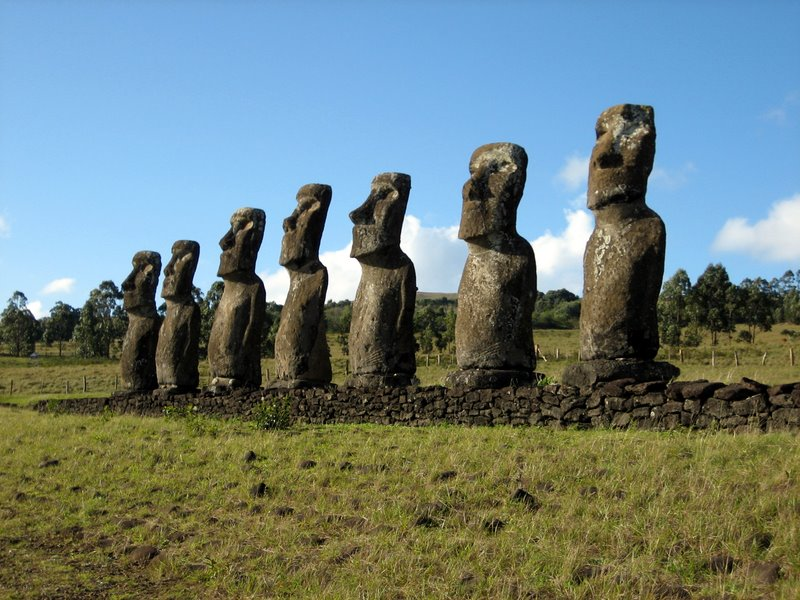
The Moai of Easter Island.

Valparaíso developed as a trans-oceanic rest stop for fishing ships, sea cruise-liners, and international naval ships. Therefore, a large proportion of residents have a variety of national origins, ethnic groups, and cultures. The 16th-century colonial population was founded by male settlers from the Spanish regions of Andalusia, Asturia and León, and the large Basque contingent has given rise to a substantial Basque Chilean population. Large numbers came from other countries of Latin America from Mexico to Uruguay, esp. came during colonial rule in the 17th century. And in the late 18th–early 19th centuries came a small wave of Galician settlers from the Spanish region of Galicia.

It is thought the majority of Valparaíso's people have some non-Spanish European background, such as: British and Irish, Australians and New Zealanders, North Americans (U.S. or Canadian), Croats and Bosnians, Dutch and Belgians, French, Germans, Greeks, Italians, Portuguese and Scandinavians. Also, there are more or less assimilated groups of Chilean Jews (mostly Ashkenazi), as well as Christians from the Ottoman Empire, primarily Syro-Lebanese and a large Palestinian community in the town of La Calera.

In racial terms, the majority of Valparaíso's inhabitants are castizos, meaning that their paternal origins are overwhelmingly from white whalers, settlers and traders of various European nationalities, including colonial Spanish settlers, while their maternal origins usually stems from unions between colonial Spanish men and local indigenous women, including those of Mapuche, Inca, Aymara and North American Indian descent (transplanted Cherokees are reported to come in the late 19th century, though it could well be a myth). Smaller numbers of East Asians, mostly Chinese, Japanese or Korean, minuscule numbers of Afro-Chileans, as well as a component of Polynesians whose ancestors were kidnapped from Easter Island and the Marquesas Islands, further added to the region's Hispanicized melting pot.

== Economics and industry ==
The Valparaíso Region is a host of agricultural lands, wine producers, and industrial activity such as copper mining and cement. Chile's largest oil refinery is located in Concón (on the mouth of the Aconcagua River and about 20 km (12 mi) north of Valparaíso) and there are two important copper ore refineries: the state-owned Ventanas (on the coast and north of Concón) and the private works in Chagres, about 55 mi (89 km) inland.

The region also is a hub for chemicals and gas storage near the port of Quintero. In the interior valleys, there is a booming export industry, mainly around the avocado (palta), chirimoyas and flowers. The most striking recent development has been the cultivation of hillsides using high-tech drip feed irrigation. This has allowed otherwise dry and unproductive land to bear high yields.

== Provinces and communes ==
Region	Province	Commune	Area (km^{2})	2002 Population	Website
Valparaíso
	Isla de Pascua				
		Isla de Pascua	164	3,791	link
Los Andes
		San Esteban	1,362	14,400	link
		Rinconada	123	6,692	link
		Los Andes	1,248	60,198	link
		Calle Larga	322	10,393	link
Marga Marga
		Villa Alemana	97	95,623	link
		Quilpué	537	128,578	link
		Limache	294	39,219	link
		Olmué	232	14,105	link
Petorca
		Zapallar	288	5,659	link
		Petorca	1,517	9,440	link
		Papudo	166	4,608	link
		La Ligua	1,163	31,987	link
		Cabildo	1,455	18,916	link
Quillota
		Quillota	302	75,916	link
		Nogales	405	21,633	link
		La Cruz	78	12,851	link
		La Calera	61	49,503	link
		Hijuelas	267	16,014	link
San Antonio
		Santo Domingo	536	7,418	link
		San Antonio	405	87,205	link
		El Tabo	99	7,028	link
		El Quisco	51	9,467	link
		Cartagena	346	16,875	link
		Algarrobo	176	8,601	link
San Felipe
		Santa María	166	12,813	link
		San Felipe	186	64,126	link
		Putaendo	1,474	14,649	link
		Panquehue	122	6,567	link
		Llaillay	349	21,644	link
		Catemu	362	12,112	link
Valparaíso
		Viña del Mar	122	286,931	link
		Valparaíso	402	275,982	link
		Quintero	148	21,174	link
		Puchuncaví	300	12,954	link
		Concón	76	32,273	link
		Casablanca	953	21,874	link
		Juan Fernández	148	633	link

== See also ==
- La Calera railway station
