= Rinconada =

- City and Commune
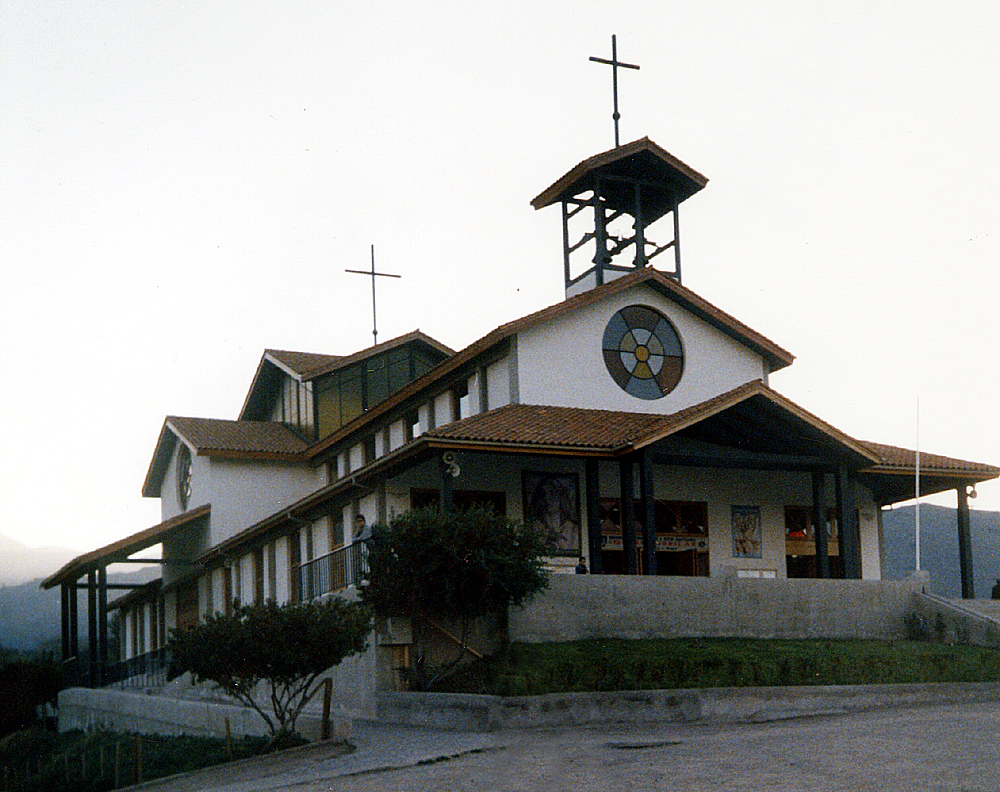
- Santuario de Santa Teresa de Los Andes

- Coat of arms Location in Chile
- Coordinates: 32°50′22″S 70°41′14″W
- Country: Chile
- Region: Valparaíso
- Province: Los Andes

Government
  - Type: Municipality
  - Alcalde: Juan Pablo Galdames Burgos (UDI)

Area
  - Total: 122.5 km^{2} (47.3 sq mi)
- Elevation: 716 m (2,349 ft)

Population (2012 Census)
  - Total: 9,354
  - Density: 76.36/km^{2} (197.8/sq mi)
  - Urban: 5,727
  - Rural: 965

Sex
  - Men: 3,429
  - Women: 3,263
- Time zone: UTC-4 (CLT)
  - Summer (DST): UTC-3 (CLST)
- Area code: 56 + 34
- Website: Municipality of Rinconada

Rinconada (Spanish pronunciation: [riŋkoˈnaða]) is a city and commune in the Los Andes Province of central Chile's Valparaíso Region. It was created on 18 January 1897 by Federico Errázuriz Echaurren.

Since the shrine to house the remains of Saint Teresa of Los Andes was built in the field of Auco, the municipality has become the spiritual capital of Chile due to the large number of pilgrims from all over the country. Behind the sanctuary is the Monastery of the Holy Spirit, where a community of Discalced Carmelite nuns resides.

== Demographics ==
According to the 2002 census of the National Statistics Institute, Rinconada spans an area of 122.5 km^{2} (47 sq mi) and has 6,692 inhabitants (3,429 men and 3,263 women). Of these, 5,727 (85.6%) lived in urban areas and 965 (14.4%) in rural areas. The population grew by 16.1% (927 persons) between the 1992 and 2002 censuses.

== Administration ==
As a commune, Rinconada is a third-level administrative division of Chile administered by a municipal council, headed by an alcalde who is directly elected every four years. The alcalde is Juan Galdames Carmona (UDI). The council has the following members:

- Rodolfo Figueroa Valle (UDI)
- Pedro Caballeria Diaz (PDC)
- David Bustos Bustos (PDC)
- Miguel Vargas Peralta (UDI)
- Hermann Guerra Aracena (RN)
- Hector Sanchez Farias (PRSD)

Within the electoral divisions of Chile, Rinconada is represented in the Chamber of Deputies by Marco Antonio Núñez (PDC) and Gaspar Rivas (RN) as part of the 11th electoral district, (together with Los Andes, San Esteban, Calle Larga, San Felipe, Putaendo, Santa María, Panquehue, Llaillay and Catemu). The commune is represented in the Senate by Ignacio Walker Prieto (PDC) and Lily Pérez San Martín (RN) as part of the 5th senatorial constituency (Valparaíso-Cordillera).
