= San Felipe de Aconcagua =

San Felipe de Aconcagua Province Provincia de San Felipe de Aconcagua
- Province
- Seal

- Location in the Valparaíso Region

- Location in Chile
- Coordinates: 32°42′S 70°45′W
- Country: Chile
- Region: Valparaíso
- Capital: San Felipe
- Communes: List of 6: Catemu; Llaillay; Panquehue; Putaendo; San Felipe; Santa María

Government
  - Type: Provincial
  - Presidential Provincial Delegate: Scarlet Valdés Pizarro (Liberal Party)

Area
  - Total: 2,659.2 km^{2} (1,026.7 sq mi)
  - Rank: 3

Population (2012 Census)
  - Total: 143,698
  - Rank: 5
  - Density: 54.038/km^{2} (139.96/sq mi)
  - Urban: 98,925
  - Rural: 32,986

Sex
  - Men: 65,090
  - Women: 66,821
- Time zone: UTC-4 (CLT)
  - Summer (DST): UTC-3 (CLST)
- Area code: 56 + 34
- Website: Delegation of San Felipe de Aconcagua

San Felipe de Aconcagua Province (Spanish: Provincia de San Felipe de Aconcagua) is one of eight provinces of the central Chilean region of Valparaíso (V). Its capital is the city of San Felipe (pop. 64,126).

== Administration ==
As a province, San Felipe de Aconcagua is a second-level administrative division, governed by a provincial delegate who is appointed by the president.

=== Communes ===
The province comprises six communes (Spanish: comunas), each governed by a municipality consisting of an alcalde and municipal council:

- Catemu
- Llaillay
- Panquehue
- Putaendo
- San Felipe (capital)
- Santa María

== Geography and demography ==
The province spans a landlocked area of 2,659.2 km^{2} (1,027 sq mi), the third largest in the Valparaíso Region. According to the 2002 census, San Felipe de Aconcagua is the fifth most populous province in the region with a population of 131,911. At that time, there were 98,925 people living in urban areas, 32,986 people living in rural areas, 65,090 men and 66,821 women.

== See also ==
- Aconcagua (wine region)
