= Los Andes, Chile =

City and Commune in Valparaíso, Chile. Underrated

Los Andes
- City and Commune
- Coat of arms Location in Chile
- Coordinates: 32°50′S 70°37′W
- Country: Chile
- Region: Valparaíso
- Province: Los Andes
- Santa Rosa de Los Andes: 31 July 1791

Government
  - Type: Municipality
  - Alcalde: Manuel Rivera Martínez

Area
  - Total: 1,248.3 km^{2} (482.0 sq mi)
- Elevation: 819 m (2,687 ft)

Population (2012 Census)
  - Total: 63,009
  - Density: 50.476/km^{2} (130.73/sq mi)
  - Urban: 55,388
  - Rural: 4,810

Sex
  - Men: 30,247
  - Women: 29,951
- Time zone: UTC-4 (CLT)
  - Summer (DST): UTC-3 (CLST)
- Area code: 56 + 34
- Climate: BSk
- Website: Official website (in Spanish)

Los Andes, founded on July 31, 1791 as Santa Rosa de Los Andes, is a Chilean city and commune located in the province of the same name, in Valparaíso Region ("Fifth Region" of Chile). It lies on the route between Santiago and Chile's primary border crossing with Argentina by way of the summit of the Uspallata Pass in the Andes mountain range.

== Demographics ==
According to the 2002 census of the National Statistics Institute, Los Andes spans an area of 1,248.3 km^{2} (482 sq mi) and has 60,198 inhabitants (30,247 men and 29,951 women). Of these, 55,388 (92%) lived in urban areas and 4,810 (8%) in rural areas. The population grew by 21% (10,451 persons) between the 1992 and 2002 censuses.

== Administration ==
As a municipality, Los Andes is a third-level administrative division of Chile governed by a municipal council, headed by an alcalde who is directly elected every four years. The 2008–2012 alcalde is Mauricio Navarro S.. The council has the following members:

- Marta Yochum G.
- Oscar Araya S.
- Alejandro Tapia C.
- Sergio Montenegro P.
- Ivan Salinas S.
- Julio Lobos L.

Within the electoral divisions of Chile, Los Andes is represented in the Chamber of Deputies by Marco Antonio Núñez (PDC) and Gaspar Rivas (RN) as part of the 11th electoral district, together with San Esteban, Calle Larga, Rinconada, San Felipe, Putaendo, Santa María, Panquehue, Llaillay and Catemu. The commune is represented in the Senate by Ignacio Walker Prieto (PDC) and Lily Pérez San Martín (RN) as part of the 5th senatorial constituency (Valparaíso-Cordillera).

== Economy ==
Los Andes principal economy is based on mining and agriculture, with vineyards and grapes being the principal fruit export. Copper and other minor minerals production is handled by Codelco Chile. From 1973 until 2004, the Automotores Franco Chilena S.A. plant assembled Peugeot and Renault automobiles from French and Argentine components in Los Andes. Peugeot production began with the 404 and ended with the 206; Renaults were also produced there between 1979 and 1991. Cars built by Automotores Franco Chilena were also exported to certain other Latin American markets. The factory was refitted to become a vehicle preparation, sales, and repair center for the national Peugeot Citroën sales network.

== Transport ==
Los Andes stands at the beginning of the now derelict 1,000 mm (3 ft 3 3/8 in) metre gauge Transandine Railway, opened in 1910, which once ran to Mendoza in Argentina, providing a link between the 1,676 mm (5 ft 6 in) broad gauge line from Valparaíso to Los Andes, operated by the Chilean State Railway, and the 1,676 mm (5 ft 6 in) broad gauge line from Mendoza to Buenos Aires operated by the Buenos Aires and Pacific Railway. It is now being reconstructed. Due to the lack of concrete actions to restore this link, the most recent estimations are that the line could be restored around October 2009. However, as of June 2011, there is no indication of any restorative work underway.

== Climate ==
Climate data for Los Andes, elevation 816 m (2,677 ft)
Month	Jan	Feb	Mar	Apr	May	Jun	Jul	Aug	Sep	Oct	Nov	Dec	Year
Mean daily maximum °C (°F)	31.6 (88.9)	31.1 (88.0)	29.2 (84.6)	25.5 (77.9)	20.3 (68.5)	16.6 (61.9)	17.3 (63.1)	18.8 (65.8)	21.2 (70.2)	24.7 (76.5)	27.9 (82.2)	30.5 (86.9)	24.6 (76.2)
Daily mean °C (°F)	22.0 (71.6)	21.3 (70.3)	18.9 (66.0)	15.4 (59.7)	11.6 (52.9)	8.9 (48.0)	9.2 (48.6)	10.4 (50.7)	12.5 (54.5)	15.5 (59.9)	18.4 (65.1)	20.9 (69.6)	15.4 (59.7)
Mean daily minimum °C (°F)	12.4 (54.3)	11.7 (53.1)	9.8 (49.6)	7.1 (44.8)	5.0 (41.0)	3.0 (37.4)	2.8 (37.0)	3.6 (38.5)	5.2 (41.4)	7.2 (45.0)	9.2 (48.6)	11.1 (52.0)	7.3 (45.2)
Average precipitation mm (inches)	2.1 (0.08)	3.8 (0.15)	3.5 (0.14)	12.8 (0.50)	65.5 (2.58)	78.1 (3.07)	53.1 (2.09)	49.5 (1.95)	21.8 (0.86)	11.3 (0.44)	4.9 (0.19)	4.0 (0.16)	310.4 (12.21)
Average relative humidity (%)	52	54	56	60	65	70	66	66	64	60	54	50	60
Source: Bioclimatografia de Chile

== Notable people ==
- Laura Rodig (1901-1972), painter, sculptor, illustrator, educator
- Gaspar Rivas (born 1978), politician
- Rene Leon Gallardo historian
