= San Felipe, Chile =

San Felipe
- Commune
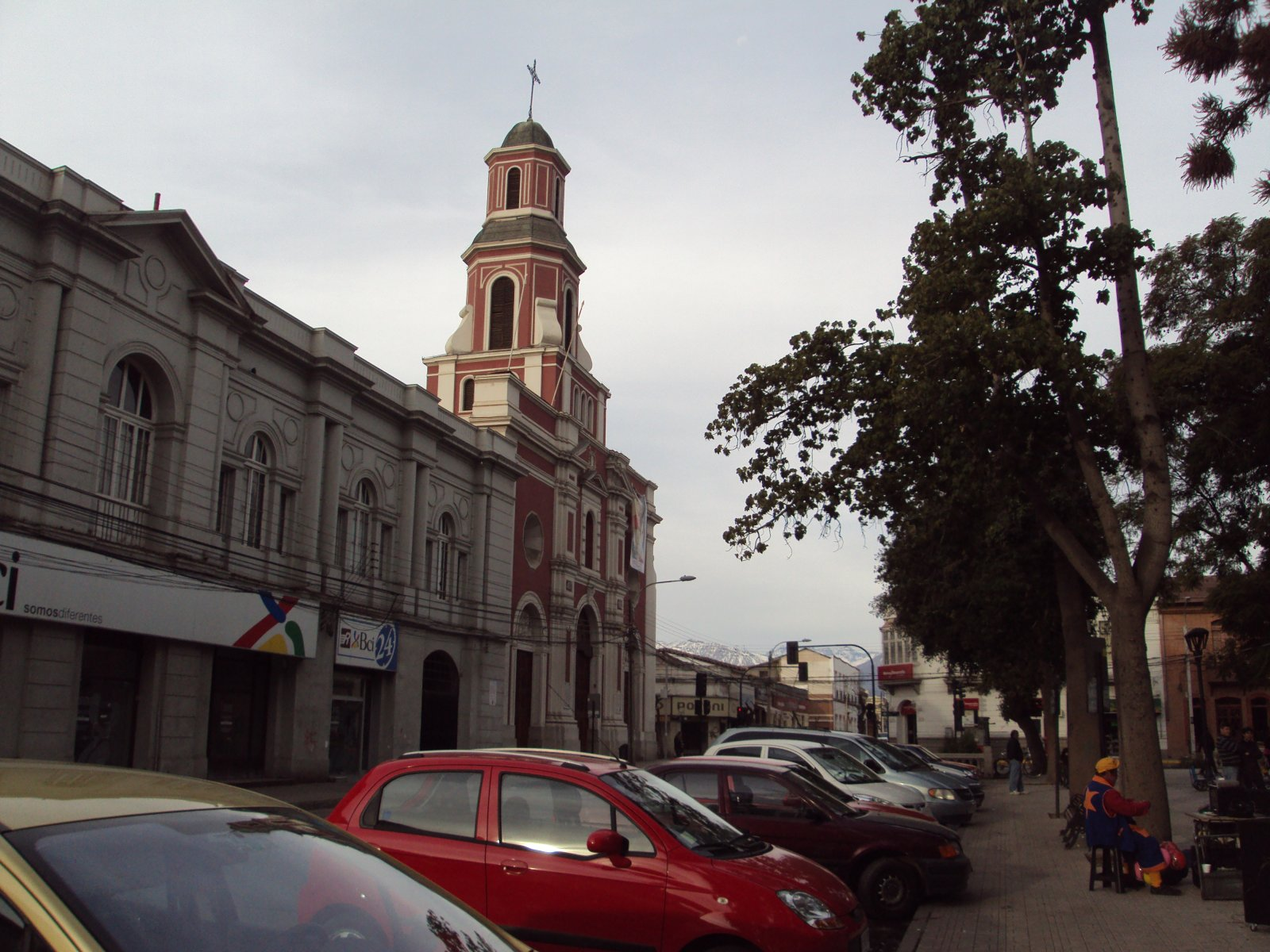

- Flag Coat of arms Location in Chile
- Coordinates: 32°45′00″S 70°43′26″W
- Country: Chile
- Region: Valparaíso
- Province: San Felipe de Aconcagua
- Villa de San Felipe de Real: 3 August 1740

Government
  - Type: Municipality

Area
  - Total: 185.9 km^{2} (71.8 sq mi)
- Elevation: 654 m (2,146 ft)

Population (2012 Census)
  - Total: 71,104
  - Density: 382.5/km^{2} (990.6/sq mi)
  - Urban: 57,760
  - Rural: 6,366
- Demonym: Sanfelipeño

Sex
  - Men: 31,036
  - Women: 33,090
- Time zone: UTC-4 (CLT)
  - Summer (DST): UTC-3 (CLST)
- Area code: 56 + 34
- Climate: BSk
- Website: sanfelipedeaconcagua.cl (in Spanish)

San Felipe (Spanish pronunciation: [saɱ feˈlipe]; "St. Philip" in Spanish) is a commune and the capital city of the San Felipe de Aconcagua Province in central Chile's Valparaíso Region. Until 1976, it was the capital of Aconcagua province, a first-level administrative division. It lies 88 km (55 mi) north of the national capital of Santiago. The commune spans an area of 185.9 km^{2} (72 sq mi).

== Demographics ==
According to data from the 2002 Census of Population and Housing, the San Felipe commune had 64,126 inhabitants; of these, 57,760 (90.1%) lived in urban areas and 6,366 (9.9%) in rural areas. At that time, there were 31,036 men and 33,090 women. The demonym for a man from San Felipe is sanfelipeño and sanfelipeña for a woman.

== Administration ==
As a commune, San Felipe is a third-level administrative division of Chile, administered by a communal council (consejo comunal), which is headed by a directly elected alcalde. The current city mayor is Patricio Freire Canto. The communal council has the following members:

- Eugenio Cornejo Correa (RN)
- Leonel Alegría Ibáñez (RN)
- Juan Manuel Millanao Calvin (UDI)
- Dante Rodríguez Vásquez (PS)
- Ricardo Covarrubias Covarrubias (PC)
- Mario Sotolicchio Urquiza (PPD)

Within the electoral divisions of Chile, San Felipe is represented in the Chamber of Deputies by Marco Antonio Núñez (PDC) and Gaspar Rivas (RN) as part of the 11th electoral district, together with Los Andes, San Esteban, Calle Larga, Rinconada, Putaendo, Santa María, Panquehue, Llaillay and Catemu. The commune is represented in the Senate by Ignacio Walker Prieto (PDC) and Lily Pérez San Martín (RN) as part of the 5th senatorial constituency (Valparaíso-Cordillera).

== Universities ==
- Universidad de Playa Ancha de Ciencias de la Educación
- Universidad de Valparaiso
- Universidad de Viña del Mar (private)
- Universidad del Aconcagua (private)
