= Panquehue =

- Town and Commune
- Location in Chile
- Coordinates (city): 32°46′16″S 70°50′12″W
- Country: Chile
- Region: Valparaíso
- Province: San Felipe de Aconcagua

Government
  - Type: Municipality
  - Alcalde: Luis Reinaldo Pradenas Moran (UDI)

Area
  - Total: 121.9 km^{2} (47.1 sq mi)
- Elevation: 511 m (1,677 ft)

Population (2012 Census)
  - Total: 6,837
  - Density: 56.09/km^{2} (145.3/sq mi)
  - Urban: 2,904
  - Rural: 3,663

Sex
  - Men: 3,312
  - Women: 3,255
- Time zone: UTC-4 (CLT)
  - Summer (DST): UTC-3 (CLST)
- Area code: 56 + 34
- Website: Municipality of Panquehue

Panquehue (Spanish pronunciation: [paŋˈkewe]) is a Chilean town and commune in San Felipe de Aconcagua Province, Valparaíso Region.

== Geography ==
Panquehue spans an area of 121.9 km^{2} (47 sq mi).

== Demographics ==
According to the 2002 census of the National Statistics Institute, Panquehue spans an area of 121.9 km^{2} (47 sq mi) and has 6,567 inhabitants (3,312 men and 3,255 women). Of these, 2,904 (44.2%) lived in urban areas and 3,663 (55.8%) in rural areas. The population grew by 11.3% (667 persons) between the 1992 and 2002 censuses.

== Administration ==
As a commune, Panquehue is a third-level administrative division of Chile, administered by a communal council (consejo comunal), which is headed by a directly elected alcalde. The current alcalde is Luis Reinaldo Pradenas Moran (UDI). The communal council has the following members:

- Patricio Zedán Zárate (UDI)
- Héctor Bazáes Leiva (RN)
- René Ahumada Ortega (DC)
- Marcelo Olguín Moreno (PS)

Within the electoral divisions of Chile, Panquehue is represented in the Chamber of Deputies by Marco Antonio Núñez (PDC) and Gaspar Rivas (RN) as part of the 11th electoral district, together with Los Andes, San Esteban, Calle Larga, Rinconada, San Felipe, Putaendo, Santa María, Llaillay and Catemu. The commune is represented in the Senate by Ignacio Walker Prieto (PDC) and Lily Pérez San Martín (RN) as part of the 5th senatorial constituency (Valparaíso-Cordillera).
