= Railway stations in Chile =

This is a list of railway stations in Chile that are part of transport in Chile. The list consists of stations in operation, proposed ones and those which have been closed.

== Stations ==
=== Existing ===
==== 1000mm gauge ====
- Antofagasta port

=== Proposed ===
- 2010 proposed high-speed line linking port city Valparaiso to capital Santiago.

Further new infrastructure projects are on hold in:

- Viña del Mar
- Quilpue
- Villa Alemana
- Limache
- Quintero
- Olmue
- Til-Til
- Lampa
- Quilicura
- Quinta Normal
- Ventanas (through an extension)
