= Marcelo Schilling =

Chilean politician

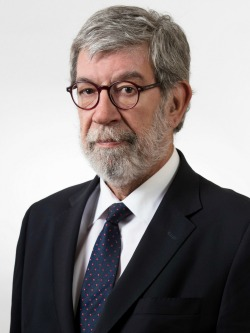

Member of the Chamber of Deputies
- In office 11 March 2018 – 11 March 2022
- Preceded by: Creation of the District
- Constituency: District 6
- In office 12 August 2008 – 11 March 2018
- Preceded by: Juan Bustos Ramírez
- Succeeded by: District dissolved
- Constituency: 12th District (Limache, Olmué, Quilpué and Villa Alemana)

Ambassador of Chile to France
- In office 28 June 2000 – 5 November 2004
- President: Ricardo Lagos
- Preceded by: Fabio Vio
- Succeeded by: Hernán Sandoval

Undersecretary of Regional and Administrative Development
- In office 19 September 1994 – 11 March 2000
- President: Eduardo Frei Ruiz-Tagle
- Preceded by: Jorge Rodríguez Grossi
- Succeeded by: Francisco Vidal Salinas

Personal details
- Born: 18 May 1949 (age 77) Temuco, Chile
- Party: Socialist Party
- Spouse: Loreto Morras
- Children: One
- Education: University of Chile (BA); National Autonomous University of Mexico (MA)
- Occupation: Politician
- Profession: Public Administrator

Marcelo Gastón Schilling Rodríguez (born 18 May 1949) is a Chilean politician who was deputy in his country.
