= Queronque rail accident =

1986 head-on train collision in Chile

Coordinates: 32°59′14″S 71°20′39″W

Queronque rail disaster

Details
- Date: February 17, 1986; 19:45
- Location: Limache, Marga Marga Province
- Country: Chile
- Line: Santiago - Valparaíso
- Operator: EFE
- Incident type: Head-on collision
- Cause: Negligence

Statistics
- Trains: 2
- Passengers: 1000
- Deaths: 58+
- Injured: 510, 111 serious

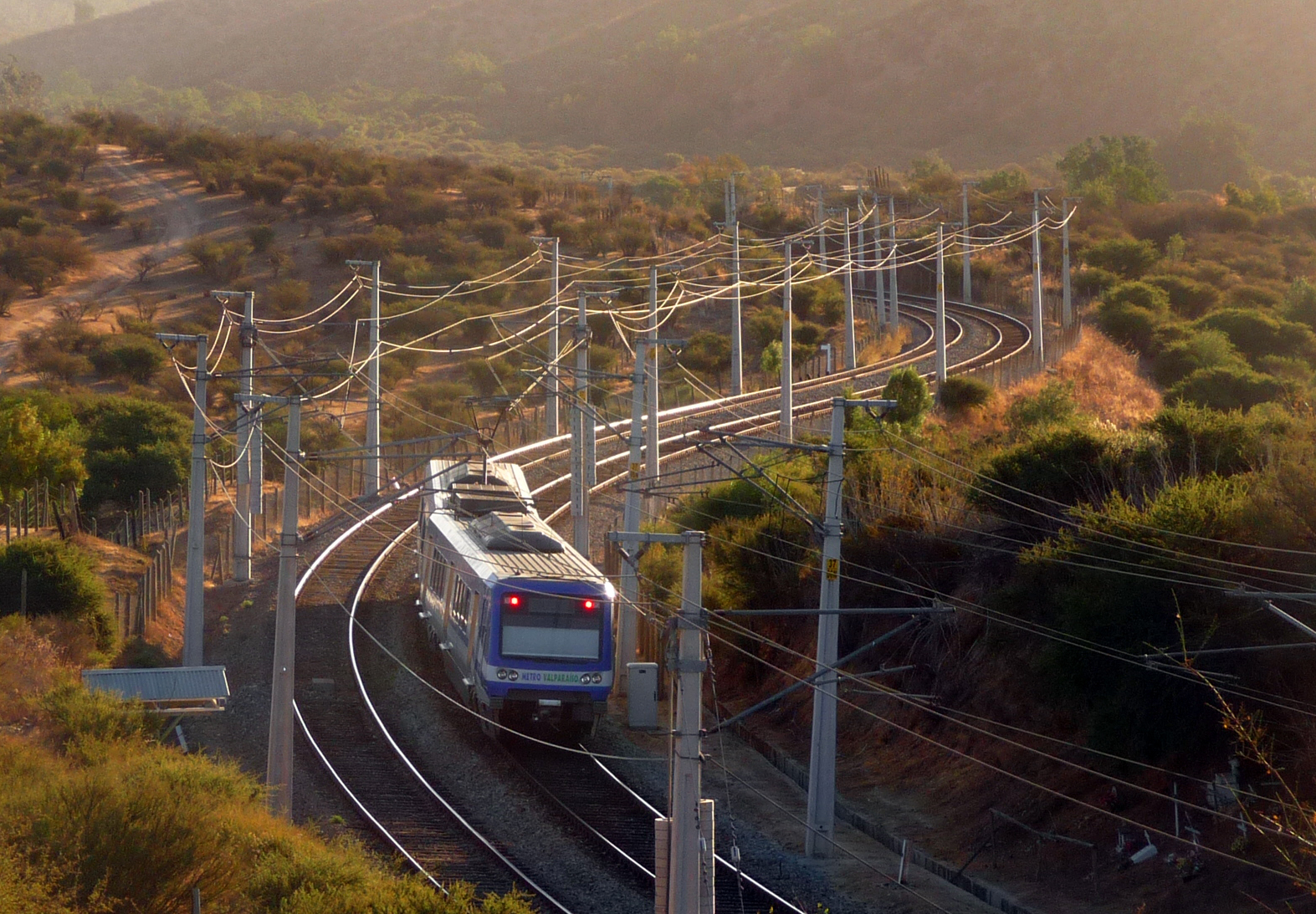
Queronque

The Queronque rail accident was a head-on train collision that happened on February 17, 1986, on the line between Santiago and Valparaíso in Chile. It is the worst in Chilean history, killing at least 58 people.

== Collision ==
The accident happened in the Marga Marga Province of Valparaíso Region, between Peñablanca and Limache stations on a sharp curve. Both of the trains involved were three-carriage electric AES units and were carrying around a thousand people in total. The accident happened at 19:45 when the 17:30 from Los Andes to Valparaiso collided head on with a train travelling from Valparaiso to Mapocho Station in Santiago. The front carriages embedded themselves in each other for a distance of five metres, killing those at the front of both trains.

== Cause ==
Repair work to a bridge damaged in an explosive attack by the FPMR six months previously meant that a single line was used for trains travelling in both directions. In addition, the signalling on the line dated from 1928 and had developed a fault a few days before the accident. But the accident was primarily blamed on the stationmaster at Limache, who should have held the train from Los Andes until the train from Valparaiso had passed. Theft of telephone cabling meant that the phone link between stations was not working, and it was over an hour before rescue teams arrived at the scene of the accident. The rescue efforts continued until 11:30 the following morning; an emergency hospital room was set up on the platform at Limache station; its speakers were used to ask for blood donors to come forward.

== Death toll ==
The official figures state that 58 people were killed and 510 injured, 111 of them seriously. However, some sources state the fatality figure to be much higher, 110 and a recent video documentary puts it at 200.

== Response ==
Dictator Augusto Pinochet visited the injured in hospital shortly after the incident and pledged compensation to those affected similar to that in place for road accident victims.

As a result of the tragedy, the train service between Santiago and Valparaiso was suspended, only resuming in 1992 with the installation of radio communications in the trains. The line is now operated by MERVAL, the Valparaiso region metro system.
