= List of Valparaíso Metro stations =

This is the list of the stations in the Valparaíso Metro in the boroughs or comunas of Valparaíso, Viña del Mar, Quilpué, Villa Alemana and the city of Limache, all part of the city of Valparaíso, capital of region Valparaíso and Chile's third biggest, most populous and important city, except for Limache, a suburban city in region Valparaíso.

== List of metro stations ==
=== Valparaíso borough ===
- Puerto
- Bellavista
- Francia
- Barón
- Caleta Portales

=== Viña del Mar borough ===
- Recreo
- Miramar
- Viña del Mar
- Hospital
- Chorrillos
- El Salto

=== Quilpué borough ===
- Quilpué
- El Sol
- El Belloto

=== Villa Alemana borough ===
- Las Américas
- Concepción
- Villa Alemana
- Sargento Aldea
- Peñablanca

Suburban trip, deferred frequencies

=== City of Limache ===
- Limache

== See also ==
- Santiago Metro
- Biotren, Concepción
- List of metro systems
