= Alfredo Calderón =

Alfredo Calderón may refer to:

- Alfredo Álvarez Calderón, Peruvian diver
- Alfredo Calderón (footballer)
