= Antonio Barchiesi =

Chilean politician (born 1990)

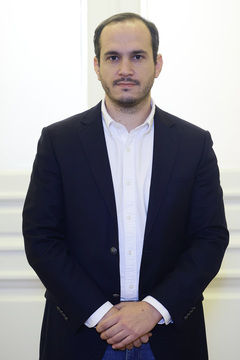

Member of the Constitutional Council
- In office 7 June 2023 – 7 November 2023
- Constituency: 6th Circumscription

Personal details
- Born: 11 April 1990 (age 36) Vina del Mar, Chile
- Party: Republican
- Other political affiliations: Independent Democratic Union
- Parent(s): Antonio Barchiesi Ferrari; Verónica Chávez
- Relatives: Chiara Barchiesi (sister)
- Education: Pontifical Catholic University of Chile (LL.B)
- Occupation: Politician
- Profession: Lawyer

David Antonio Barchiesi Chávez (born 10 April 1990) is a Chilean lawyer and politician. He is a founding member of the Republican Party of Chile.

He served as a member of the Constitutional Council representing the 6th constituency of the Valparaíso Region.

== Biography ==
Barchiesi was born on 10 April 1990 in Viña del Mar, Chile. He is the son of Antonio Barchiesi Ferrari, a municipal councillor for the Independent Democratic Union in Villa Alemana between 2008 and 2020 and one of the founders of the Republican Party of Chile, and Verónica Chávez Peirano.

He is the brother of Chiara Barchiesi, who has served as a member of the Chamber of Deputies representing the 6th electoral district of the Valparaíso Region.

From 2009 to 2013, he studied Law at the Pontifical Catholic University of Chile, completing his undergraduate education there. He was admitted to the bar on 12 May 2017.

== Political career ==
Barchiesi began his political activity as a member of the Independent Democratic Union (UDI). He later joined the Republican Party of Chile (REP), of which he was one of its founders. Within the party, he served as deputy secretary-general and as executive director of the think tank Acción Republicana.

He was also a founder of Ideas Republicanas, a platform focused on debate and analysis of public affairs from a normative and political perspective.

In the elections held on 7 May 2023, Barchiesi ran for the Constitutional Council representing the 6th constituency of the Valparaíso Region as a candidate of the Republican Party. According to official results from the Electoral Court of Chile (TRICEL), he was elected with 223,379 votes.
