= Palmira Romano =

Chilean politician

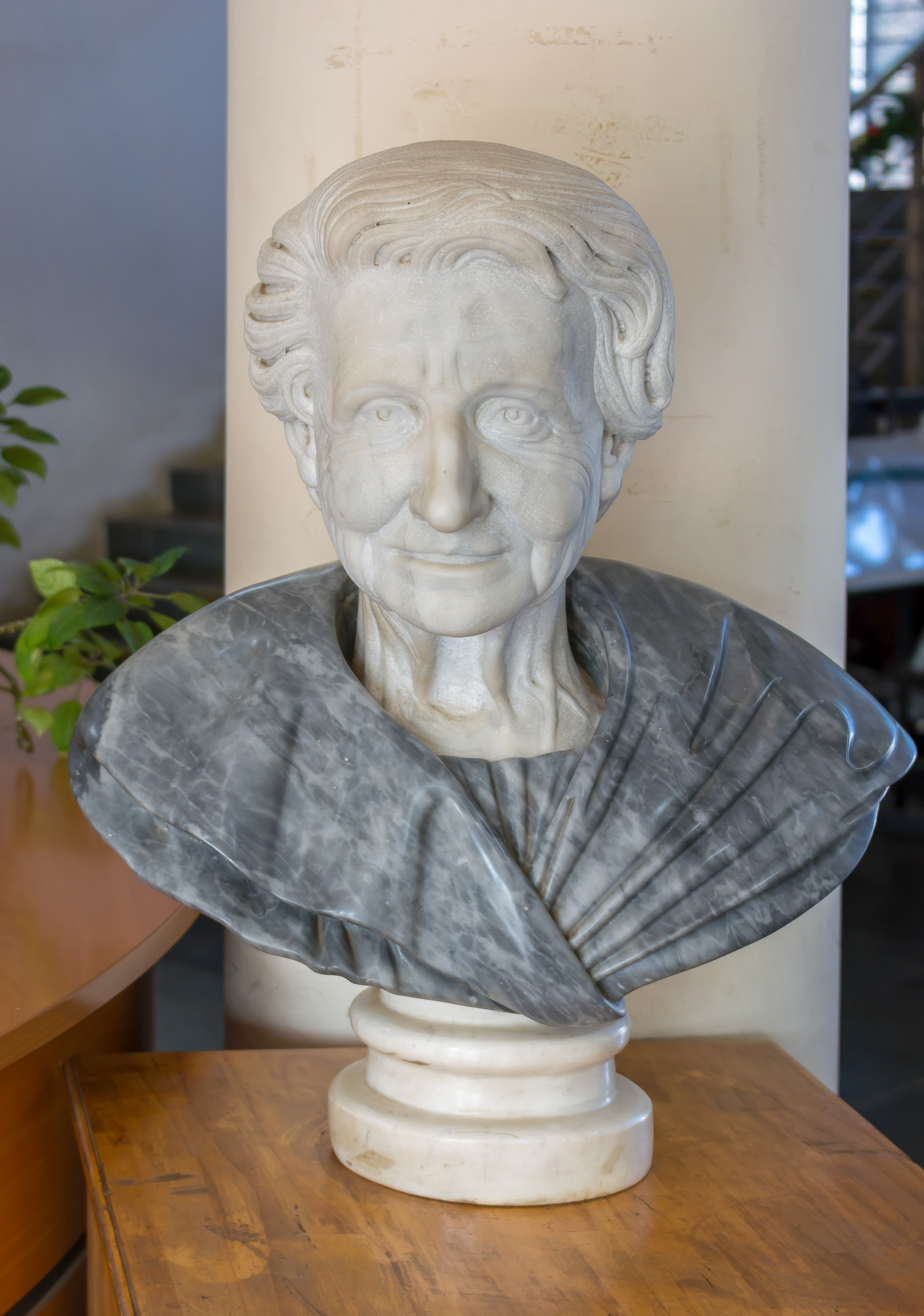
Bust of Palmira Romano, Limache, Valparaíso Region, Chile

Palmira Adelaida Romano Piraino (Limache, May 28, 1903 - Ibíd., July 15, 1995) was a Chilean politician, former councilwoman, councilor, and mayor of Limache.

Mrs. Palmira Romano served as a councilwoman in the commune of Limache between 1956 and 1960, holding the position for two more terms from 1963 to 1973. In 1960, she assumed the role of mayor of Limache for the first time, a position she would hold on four occasions. Additionally, between 1992 and 1994, she served as a councilor in the same commune.

She died on July 15, 1995, at the age of 92, while serving as the mayor of the commune of Limache. Prior to her death, she bequeathed her home to the Illustrious Municipality of Limache, along with most of the furniture, with the explicit condition that it be used as a museum.
