= EFE Tipo 80 =

Tipo 80
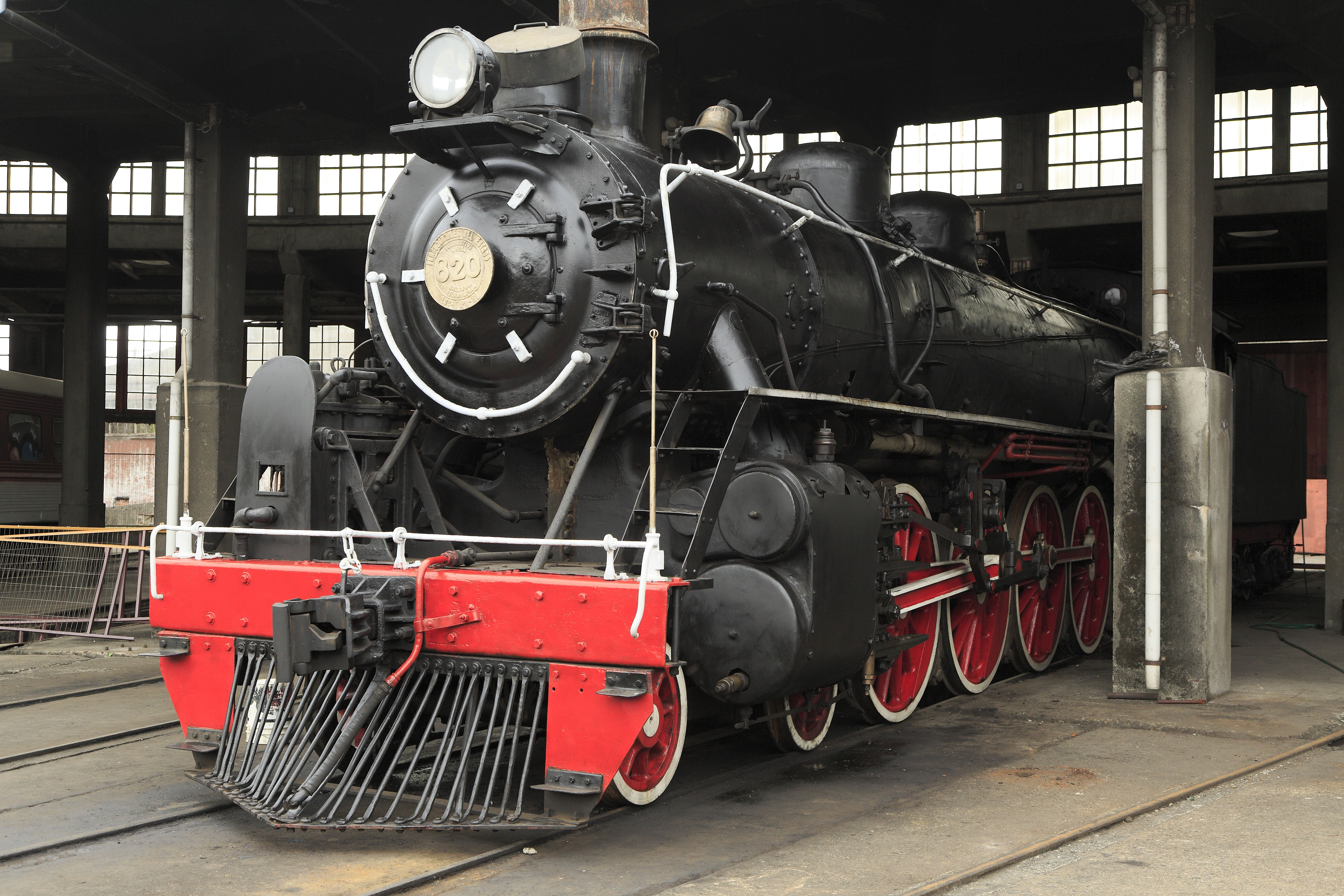
- 820 in the roundhouse of the Museo Nacional Ferroviario Pablo Neruda.
Type and origin
- Power type: Steam
- Builder: Baldwin (1929, 1937, 1940, and 1947 batches) Maestranza San Bernardo (837, 838, 839) Mitsubishi (1952-53 batch)
- Serial number: 1929 batch: 61106-61117; 1937 batch: 62241-62247; 1940 batch: 62422-62426; 1947 batch: 73102-73113; 1952-53 batch: 731-776
- Build date: 1929, 1937, 1940, 1947, 1952, 1953
- Total produced: 69
Specifications
- Configuration
  - Whyte: 4-8-2
- Gauge: 1,676 mm (5 ft 6 in)
- Driver dia.: 5 ft 6 in (1,676 mm)
- Frame type: Bar
- Loco weight: 220 short tons (200 long tons; 200 t)
- Firebox
  - Grate area: 52.3 sq ft (4.86 m^{2})
- Boiler pressure: 205 psi (14.1 bar; 1,410 kPa)
- Feedwater heater: Worthington
- Cylinder size: 22.5 in (572 mm) diameter × 28 in (711 mm) stroke
Performance figures
- Tractive effort: 37,374 lbf (166.25 kN)
Career
- Operators: Chilean State Railways
- Number in class: 69
- Numbers: 801-869
- Locale: Chile
- Retired: 1979
- Preserved: 802, 803, 820, 823, 841, 844, 846, 848, 849, 858, 869
- Disposition: 11 preserved, remainder scrapped

The EFE Tipo 80 was a series of 4-8-2 steam locomotives constructed for the Chilean State Railways. The series consisted of 69 engines built in five batches between 1929 and 1953. The first four batches were built by Baldwin Locomotive Works, consisting of twelve engines numbered 801 to 812 purchased in 1929, followed by seven additional engines numbered 813 to 819 in 1937, then five more numbered 820 to 824 in 1940, and fifteen numbered 825 to 839 in 1947, the final three of which were built in the railway's Maestranza San Bernardo shops using spare components. The fifth and final batch was built by Mitsubishi Heavy Industries between 1952 and 1953, consisting of 29 engines numbered 840 to 869.

The engines were designed to operate express passenger service between Santiago, Talca, San Antonio, and Cartagena, and would be relegated to more southern portions of the network as the railway electrified. The class was retired around 1980, with most engines scrapped. Eleven examples are known to be preserved:

- 803, 820, 841, 844, 848, 849, 858, 869 are preserved at the Museo Nacional Ferroviario Pablo Neruda, Temuco.
- 846 is at the Museo Ferroviario de Santiago, Quinta Normal.
- 823 is on display at the Villa Alemana metro station.
- 802 is preserved at the railway museum in San Rosendo.

== Bibliography ==
- Tufnell, Robert (2000). The New Illustrated Encyclopedia of Railways. Vancouver: Select Editions. ISBN 9781894426510 – via Internet Archive.
- Coombs, Martin (March 2022). "Chilean steam locomotive lists, Part 1: Broad gauge locos" (PDF). Railways of the Far South.
