= Diego Ibáñez =

Chilean politician (born 1989)

- Official portrait, 2026

Member of the Senate
- Incumbent
- Assumed office 11 March 2026
- Constituency: 6th Circumscription

Member of the Chamber of Deputies
- In office 11 March 2018 – 11 March 2026
- Preceded by: Established
- Constituency: District 6

Vice President of the Pontifical Catholic University of Valparaíso Students Federation
- In office 2013–2014

Personal details
- Born: 25 January 1989 (age 37) Punta Arenas, Chile
- Party: Broad Front (since 2024)
- Other political affiliations: Social Convergence (2019–2024); Autonomist Movement (until 2019)
- Parent(s): Rosamel Ibáñez Cifuentes; Dafne Cotroneo Calderón
- Education: Pontifical Catholic University of Valparaíso
- Occupation: Politician

Diego Eduardo Ibáñez Cotroneo (born 25 January 1989) is a Chilean politician, law school graduate, and environmental activist, member of the left-wing party Broad Front. Since March 2026 he has served as Senator of the Valparaíso Region.

From 2018 to 2026, he was a member of the Chamber of Deputies for District 6, corresponding to the northern Valparaíso Region. From 2022 to 2024, he served as president of Social Convergence.

== Early life ==
Ibáñez was born on 25 January 1989 in Punta Arenas, Chile. He is the son of Rosamel Ibáñez Cifuentes, a sailor, and Dafne Cotroneo Calderón, a professor. He completed his primary and secondary studies at Colegio Liahona in El Belloto, in the Quilpué commune. In 2010, he moved to Valparaíso to enter the Law School of the Pontifical Catholic University of Valparaíso, completing his coursework but not the bar exam required to qualify as a lawyer. He served as vice president of the Pontifical Catholic University of Valparaíso Students Federation in 2013–2014.

== Political career ==
=== Environmental activism ===
Ibáñez was the founder and spokesperson of the non-governmental organization "Pulmón Verde de Quilpué," which staged protests against the "Termoeléctrica Los Rulos." In January 2018, during the first day of the Olmué Festival, he participated in a coordinated demonstration against the thermoelectric power plant supported by Residente.

=== First parliamentary term ===
In August 2017, he registered his candidacy for deputy of District 6 in the Valparaíso Region. He won with 9,199 votes, or 2.9% of the total.

After being a member of the Libertarian Students Front, he joined the Autonomist Movement in the Valparaíso region. As a parliamentarian, he joined the caucus of President Gabriel Boric.

He has worked on environmental protection issues including closing thermoelectric power plants, protecting dunes, lakes and wetlands from motor vehicles, and preventing the construction of real estate projects after forest fires.

He has introduced anti-corruption projects aimed at reducing electoral spending in campaigns from private sector officials.

=== Second parliamentary term ===
He ran for re-election as deputy from the sixth electoral district, obtaining the highest number of votes both in the district and regionally with 34,419 votes, or 9.69% of the total.

He is part of the Broad Front, along with deputies from Democratic Revolution, Comunes, and Social Convergence.

He began a Special Investigative Commission on the drought in Petorca Province. After requesting that the commission hold sessions in the field to draw community participation, he was censured by the president of the Chamber with the votes of right-wing deputies.

In October 2022, he was elected president of Social Convergence, position he held until the party's merger into the Broad Front in 2024.

In April 2023, he denounced the high amounts that businesspeople invest in electoral campaigns which led to a lawsuit for defamation and slander by Juan Sutil, who was then-president of the Confederation of Production and Commerce (Spanish: Confederación de la Producción y del Comercio). The lawsuit was dismissed by the Court of Appeals of Santiago in August 2023.

For the 2022 constitutional referendum, he posted a meme of Chayanne urging people to vote "Approve." This post was briefly shared by Boric, prompting the singer's team to react through a press release requesting that his image not be used for political campaigns.
