= Alfredo Calderón (footballer) =

Chilean footballer (born 1986)

Personal information
- Full name: Alfredo Andrés Calderón Rosales
- Date of birth: 24 February 1986 (age 40)
- Place of birth: Limache, Chile
- Height: 1.92 m (6 ft 4 in)
- Position: Striker

Team information
- Current team: Curacaví FC
- Number: 21

Youth career
- Villa Independencia
- Miraflores Limache
- 2001–2005: Coquimbo Unido

Senior career*
Years	Team	Apps	(Gls)
2005–2008	Coquimbo Unido	54	(13)
2007	→ Deportes Ovalle (loan)		
2009–2010	Santiago Wanderers	18	(3)
2012	San Luis	10	(3)
2012	Lota Schwager	8	(1)
2013	Racing de Olavarría	15	(3)
2015	Deportes Valdivia	4	(2)
2016–2017	Lota Schwager	18	(8)
2017	Deportes Pintana	17	(6)
2019	Deportivo Caupolicán	–	(–)
2020	Fedenort	–	(–)
2025–	Curacaví FC	–	(–)
- * Club domestic league appearances and goals as of 12 January 2025

Alfredo Andrés Calderón Rosales (born 24 February 1986) is a Chilean footballer who plays as a striker for Curacaví FC.

== Career ==
As a child, Calderón was with Villa Independencia and Club Miraflores in his hometown. Then he joined Coquimbo Unido youth system. A young player yet, he scored a goal versus Everton in the 2005 Torneo Apertura of the Primera División, becoming an important piece in the championship, where his club was the runner-up. He also is well remembered by the club fans after scored a goal versus Deportes La Serena, the traditional rival, in a 2–2 draw what was played in two parts due to incidents from both clubs fans. In 2007, he played on loan at Deportes Ovalle and was chosen as the best player of the Tercera División.

In 2009, he joined Santiago Wanderers in the Primera B, getting promotion to Primera División after the club was the runner-up of the 2009 Primera B. In 2012 he played for San Luis de Quillota and Lota Schwager in the Primera B. For Lota Schwager, he just scored one goal versus Coquimbo Unido in the last matchday of the 2012 Clausura, where his club could stay at the category.

In 2013 he played for Racing de Olavarría in Argentina, what was coached by Víctor Comisso, a former coach of Coquimbo Unido in 2008.

He left the football activity during 2014. After playing for Deportes Valdivia in 2015, he left the football activity again until October 2016, when he signed with Lota Schwager in the Segunda División Profesional, scoring eight times. In June 2017 he tried to sign with Coquimbo Unido, but the coach Patricio Graff rejected him. So he joined Deportes Pintana, his last club.

After his retirement, he made his home in Coquimbo and has played for amateur clubs such as Deportivo Caupolicán and Fedenort, where he coincided with other former professional footballers such as Félix Cortés and Miguel Ángel Estay.

In 2025, Calderón returned to football in the Chilean league system by signing with Curacaví FC.

== Personal life ==
In 2017, he began to study for becoming a football manager) at the INAF (National Football Institute).

His son, Adriano, is a football forward from the Coquimbo Unido youth ranks.

== Honours ==
- Tercera División de Chile Best Player: 2007
