= Francisca Bello =

Chilean politician

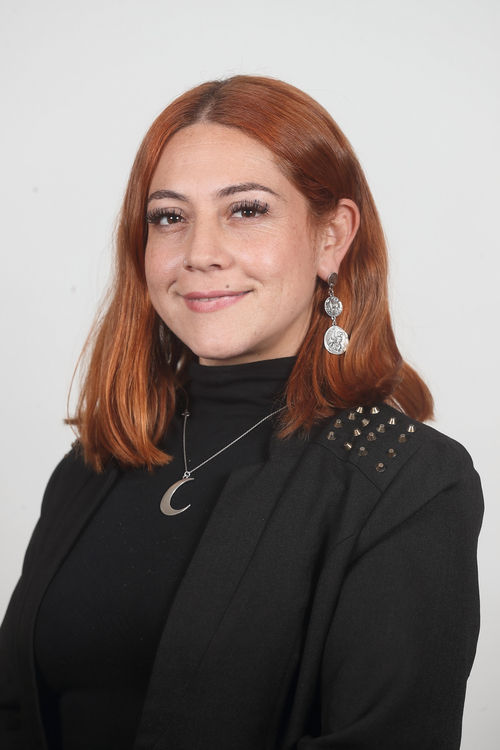

Member of the Chamber of Deputies
- Incumbent
- Assumed office 11 March 2022
- Constituency: District 6

Personal details
- Born: 17 September 1987 (age 38) Santiago, Chile
- Party: Social Convergence (CS)
- Education: Andrés Bello National University
- Profession: Psychologist

María Francisca Bello Campos (born 17 September 1987) is a Chilean politician and feminist activist. Since 2021, she has served, as a representative from District 6. She is one of the first openly bisexual Chilean representatives.

From a young age, she has been an adherent of the Socialist Party and actively participated in the Student Federation at Andrés Bello National University. In the 2021 municipal elections, she ran for mayor of San Felipe representing the Broad Front but was not elected.

In the parliamentary elections held in November 2021, Bello was elected as a representative of District 6 with the Apruebo Dignidad coalition along with Diego Ibáñez. She is openly bisexual, and is one of a group of LGBT representatives with Camila Musante, Marcela Riquelme, Emilia Schneider.

== Early life ==
Born in Santiago, Chile, she grew up in the San Felipe commune, where she completed her primary education at the "Colegio Alemán de San Felipe" and her secondary education at the "Liceo Bicentenario Corina Urbina Villanueva".

Later, she pursued a degree in Psychology at Andrés Bello University.

== Political career ==
In December 2020, the Broad Front (Frente Amplio) nominated her as its candidate for mayor of San Felipe in the municipal elections held on 15 and 16 May 2021. She received 3,482 votes, corresponding to 13.73% of the total valid votes, and was not elected.

Following the May election, in August 2021 she registered her candidacy for the Chamber of Deputies representing the Social Convergence party ―Convergencia Social―, within the Apruebo Dignidad coalition, for the 6th District of the Valparaíso Region for the 2022–2026 legislative period. She was elected in November with 8,741 votes, equivalent to 2.46% of the total valid votes.

In 2023, she served as territorial coordinator for the Valparaíso Region campaign of Constitutional Council candidate María Pardo (CS).

Since July 2024, she has been a member of the Broad Front party ―Frente Amplio―. In the parliamentary elections held on 16 November 2025, she was elected deputy for the 6th District of the Valparaíso Region, representing the Broad Front within the Unidad por Chile coalition, obtaining 30,663 votes.
