= Sofía González (politician) =

Chilean politician (born 1987)

- González in 2026

Member of the Chamber of Deputies
- Incumbent
- Assumed office 11 March 2026
- Constituency: District 6

Personal details
- Born: 29 September 1987 (age 39)
- Party: Communist Party

Sofía Alejandra González Cortés (born 29 September 1987) is a Chilean politician serving as a member of the Chamber of Deputies since 2026. From 2022 to 2024, she served as presidential delegate for the Valparaíso Region.
