= Quilpué =

- City and Commune
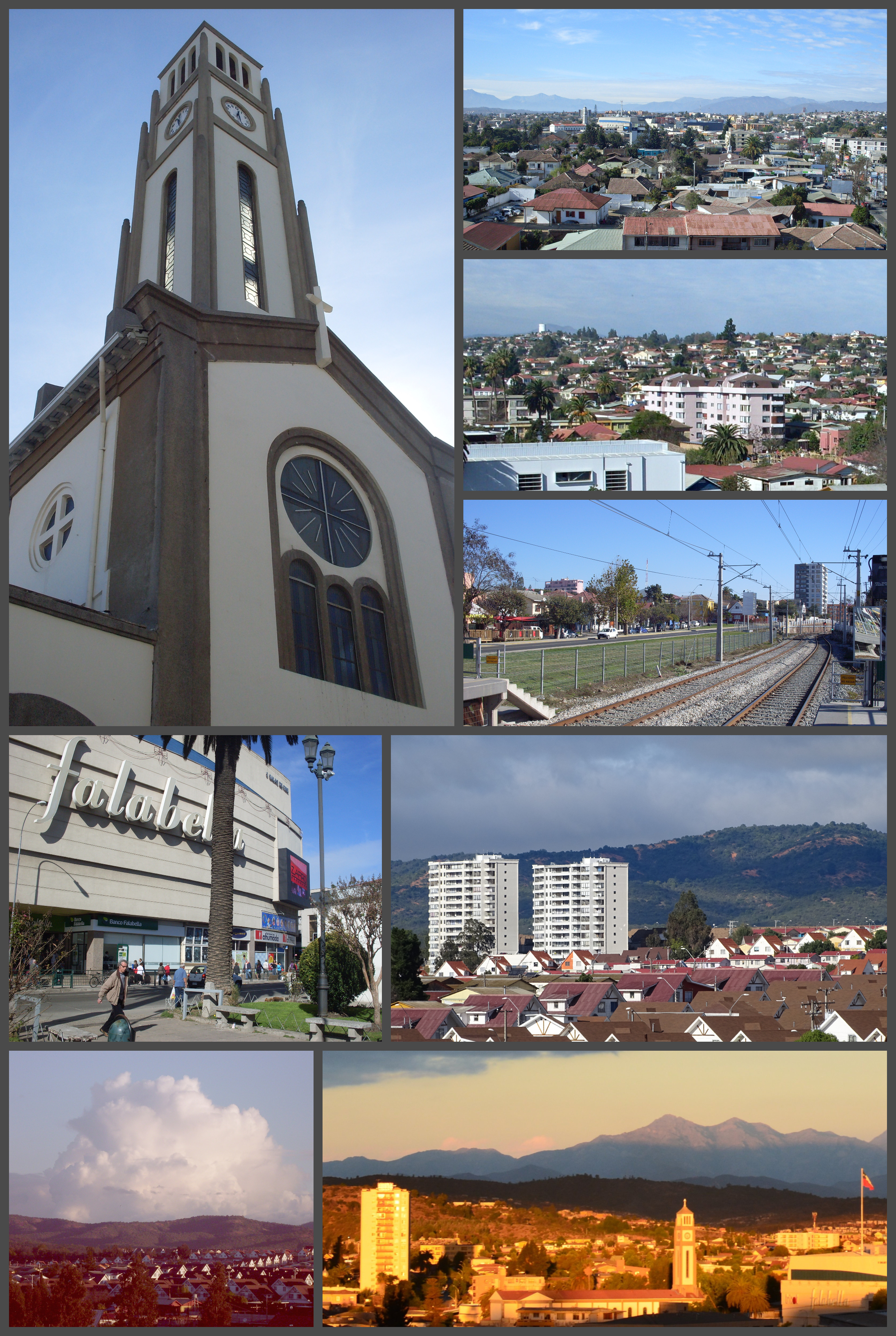

- Coat of arms Location in Chile
- Nickname: "City of the Sun" (Ciudad del Sol)
- Coordinates (city): 33°03′S 71°27′W
- Country: Chile
- Region: Valparaíso
- Province: Marga Marga
- Founded: 1898

Government
  - Type: Municipality
  - Alcalde: Carolina Corti (RN)

Area
  - Total: 536.9 km^{2} (207.3 sq mi)
- Elevation: 141 m (463 ft)

Population (2024 Census)
  - Total: 162,559
  - Density: 302.8/km^{2} (784.2/sq mi)
- Time zone: UTC-4 (CLT)
  - Summer (DST): UTC-3 (CLST)
- Postal code: 2430000
- Area code: +56 32
- Climate: Csb
- Website: Official website (in Spanish)

Quilpué is a city and capital of the Marga Marga Province in central Chile's Valparaíso Region. It is part of the Greater Valparaíso metropolitan area. It is widely known as "City of the Sun" (Ciudad del Sol) and the urban part of it also comprises the town of El Belloto, an area that showed rapid growth in the late 1990s.

== Etymology ==
There are various theories about the origin of the word Quilpué. According to some, Quilpué means 'place where there are pigeons', arguing that pigeons were found abundantly in the area and that the name derives from the aboriginal words cullpo 'ground dove' and hue 'place'. Other authors suggest that it means 'place of the stone lancet', because the Picunches (the indigenous Mapuche people) were experts in the manufacture of these items that were used for medical procedures. Numbers of these stone lancets have been found in the area's archaeological sites, as well as the original formation which was quarried for them.

== Tourism ==
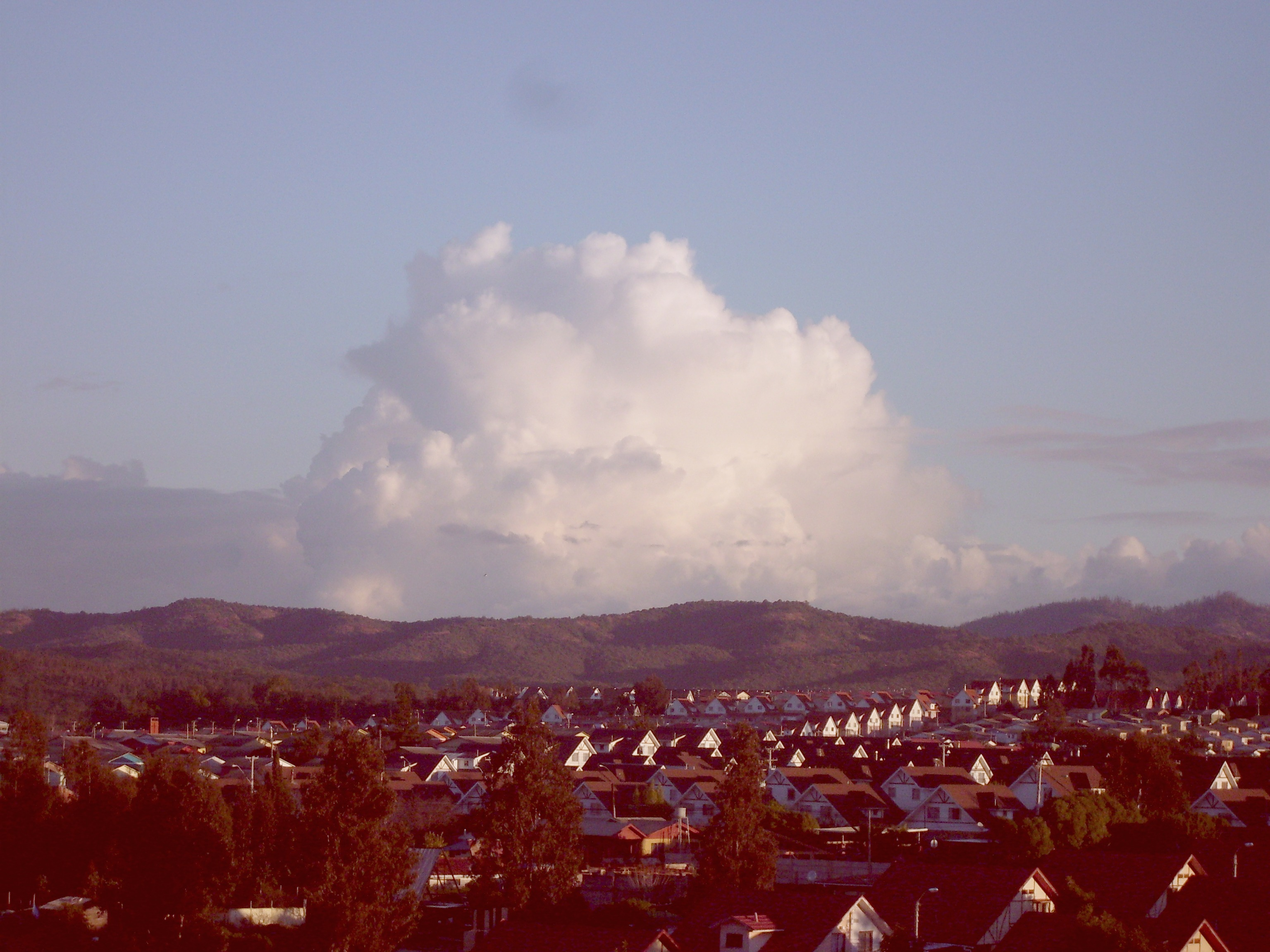
Los Pinos, a residential sector of Quilpué

Quilpué is called Ciudad del Sol because compared to Valparaíso, it has many more sunny days a year. It has a metropolitan train, highway and bus connections to Viña del Mar and Valparaíso to the coast, and also towards inland cities. Since housing is cheaper in Quilpué, thousands of people commute every day to the coastal cities.

Quilpué is connected to Santiago through the Route 68, with an estimated travel time of 1.15h by car and 1.30h by inter-regional bus services, that departs and arrive mostly from Pajaritos metro and interchange station, west of the national capital.

Local attractions include a zoo (the only one in the Valparaíso Region), and the rural towns of Colliguay and the Marga-Marga Valley, both with facilities for camping and hiking.

== City facts ==
- Surface area: 537 km^{2} (207 sq mi)
- Population: 128,579 (67,249 females and 61,329 males) – 8.35% of the 5th Region's population.
- Urban population: 98.69%
- Rural population: 1.31%
- (Source: 2002 census)

== History ==
Indigenous peoples had settled the area long before Governor Pedro de Valdivia gave the land to Rodrigo de Araya in 1547. Mining was the main economic activity for many years, until the land was further divided in the 17th century.

== Administration ==
Quilpué was made province capital when the Marga Marga province became effective March 11, 2010. The province was created by Law 20,368 on August 25, 2009.

As a commune, Quilpué is a third-level administrative division of Chile administered by a municipal council, headed by a mayor (alcalde) who is directly elected every four years. The city hall is located at 684 Vicuña Mackenna street. For the years 2024–2028, the mayor is Carolina Corti Badía (RN) and the council members are:

- Javier Cortés Zapata (Ind./RN)
- Francisco Villegas Alegre (FA)
- Paula Castro Astudillo (Ind./FA)
- Daniel Raab Camalez (RN)
- Renzo Aranda Contreras (DC)
- Marco Aguirre Núñez (REP)
- Paola Toledo Orellana (REP)
- Mónica Neira Elgueta (REP)

Within the electoral divisions of Chile, Quilpué is represented in the Chamber of Deputies for the years 2022-2026 by Andrés Longton (RN), Camila Flores (RN), Chiara Barchiesi (REP), Diego Ibáñez (FA), Francisca Bello (FA), Nelson Venegas (PS), Carolina Marzán (PPD) and Gaspar Rivas (PDG) as part of the 6th electoral district, (together with Olmué, Limache, Villa Alemana, La Ligua, Petorca, Cabildo, Zapallar, Papudo, Quintero, Puchuncaví, Quillota, Nogales, Hijuelas, La Calera, La Cruz, San Felipe, Panquehue, Catemu, Putaendo, Santa María, Llay-Llay, Los Andes, Calle Larga, San Esteban and Rinconada). The commune is represented in the Senate by Kenneth Pugh (RN), Francisco Chahuán (RN), Ricardo Lagos Weber (PPD), Isabel Allende (PS) y Juan Ignacio Latorre (FA) as part of the 6th senatorial constituency (Valparaíso Region).

== Educational institutions ==
Campus housing part of the Pontificia Universidad Católica de Valparaíso Faculty of Engineering is located in the suburb of Valencia and Universidad de Aconcagua is located in Paso Hondo.

== Sports ==
The city is home to the basketball club Colegio Los Leones de Quilpué which competes in the international Liga Sudamericana de Básquetbol and the national Liga Nacional de Básquetbol de Chile. The team plays its home games at the Gimnasio Colegio Los Leones.

== Notable residents ==
- Rosita Serrano (1912–1997), singer and actress

== Climate ==
Climate data for Quilpué
Month	Jan	Feb	Mar	Apr	May	Jun	Jul	Aug	Sep	Oct	Nov	Dec	Year
Mean daily maximum °C (°F)	26.1 (79.0)	26.3 (79.3)	25.7 (78.3)	23.5 (74.3)	19.2 (66.6)	15.8 (60.4)	15.4 (59.7)	17.8 (64.0)	18.3 (64.9)	19.0 (66.2)	23.9 (75.0)	26.0 (78.8)	21.4 (70.5)
Daily mean °C (°F)	19.1 (66.4)	18.6 (65.5)	17.3 (63.1)	14.3 (57.7)	10.8 (51.4)	10.5 (50.9)	9.9 (49.8)	10.8 (51.4)	12.4 (54.3)	14.3 (57.7)	16.7 (62.1)	18.5 (65.3)	14.4 (58.0)
Mean daily minimum °C (°F)	10.9 (51.6)	9.8 (49.6)	8.6 (47.5)	5.4 (41.7)	3.0 (37.4)	3.9 (39.0)	3.4 (38.1)	4.1 (39.4)	5.8 (42.4)	6.9 (44.4)	8.5 (47.3)	8.9 (48.0)	6.6 (43.9)
Average precipitation mm (inches)	3.4 (0.13)	6.7 (0.26)	4.2 (0.17)	16.0 (0.63)	104.4 (4.11)	168.5 (6.63)	115.0 (4.53)	112.7 (4.44)	31.4 (1.24)	18.3 (0.72)	4.8 (0.19)	3.0 (0.12)	588.4 (23.17)
Average relative humidity (%)	76	75	77	78	79	84	86	84	84	81	74	70	79
Source: Bioclimatografia de Chile
