= Social Patriot Movement =

Chilean neo-Nazi group

- Movimiento Social Patriota
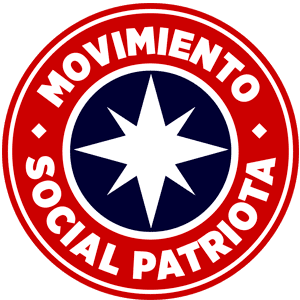
- Leaders: Pedro Kunstmann (since 2017); Gaspar Rivas (2019); Francisco Tudela (since 2022)
- Dates active: April 2017 – Onwards
- Active regions: Chile
- Ideology: Neo-fascism; Neo-Nazism; Ultranationalism; Anti-capitalism; Antifeminism; Anticommunism
- Political position: Far-right
- Size: 500 members

The Social Patriot Movement (in Spanish, Movimiento Social Patriota, MSP) is a Chilean neo-fascist group formed in April 2017, and led by lawyer Pedro Kunstmann. It has been widely described as "neo-Nazi", making it the largest group of such ideology in Chile in recent years.

They have openly denied accusations of Nazism, and they have described themselves as "antiglobalist national-populists." They point to as a source of inspiration both the National-Socialist Movement (MNS) and the writers Nicolás Palacios and Miguel Serrano Fernández.

== Activism ==
The MSP was formed at the beginning of 2017 mainly by young people from Peñalolén, who, taking the example of CasaPound, Amanecer Dorado and Hogar Social Madrid, dedicated themselves to helping the poorest sector of the capital by delivering food and clothing.

Their first actions were in 2017 against the Movement for Homosexual Integration and Liberation (in Spanish, Movimiento de Integración y Liberación Homosexual, MOVILH), and its spokesman, Rolando Jiménez, who they also allegedly threatened. At the beginning of 2018, they attracted attention with a canvas that read "Yerko Puchento, faggot who abused women" (in Spanish, Yerko Puchento, Maricón maltratador de mujeres), alluding to Daniel Alcaíno, who days before had treated the model Daniella Chávez as a prostitute. In June 2018, dolls dressed as priests were hung from their necks with the slogan "Abuser priest, hanged for being a traitor" (in Spanish, Cura abusador, a la horca por traidor) and, later on, another poster with a transphobic message attacking the actress Daniela Vega.

One of their most controversial actions occurred when they spilled red paint during one of the feminist demonstrations in Chile in 2018 to protest against the demand for free abortion. That same day they were accused of stabbing three young protesters, which was later denied.

In 2019, they were the main organizers of the "March for Chile", a protest against mass migration and the new migration law from the Second Government of Sebastián Piñera. The march was described as "xenophobic" and "racist" by some media, and which was banned by the Metropolitan Municipality due to the call to carry retractable canes made by other movements. Several days later, it was authorized, and, despite having only just over 70 people, it generated some clashes with counter-protesters. The organizer, Pedro Kunstmann stated that "500 Chileans" assisted.

They tried to consolidate themselves as a political party at the end of 2019, and, for a short time, they used the name of Partido Social Patriota (Social Patriot Party). Despite their efforts, the initiative failed.

In February 2020, they were accused of throwing Molotov cocktails in an activity headed by the mayor of Recoleta, Daniel Jadue, which was later ruled out by the movement.
