= Gaspar Rivas =

Chilean politician (born 1978)

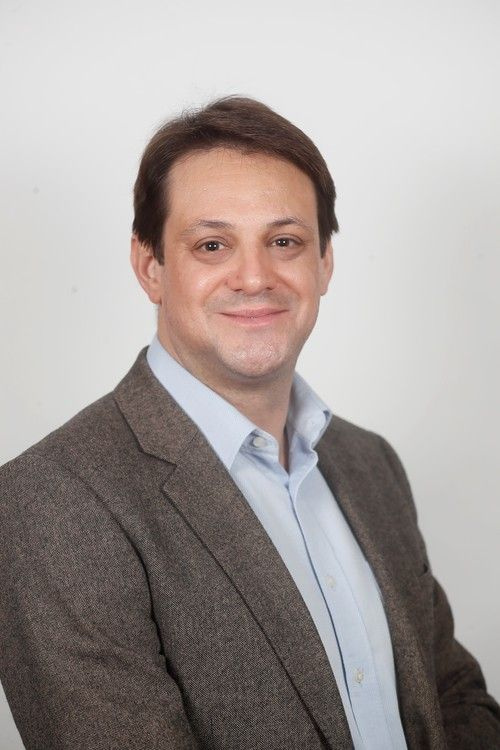

Member of the Chamber of Deputies of Chile
- In office 11 March 2022 – 11 March 2026
- Preceded by: Pablo Kast
- Constituency: District 6
- In office 11 March 2010 – 11 March 2018
- Succeeded by: Dissolution of the district
- Constituency: 11th District

Personal details
- Born: Gaspar Alberto Rivas Sánchez; 17 May 1978 (age 48) Los Andes, Chile
- Party: Independent
- Other political affiliations: Renovación Nacional (2005−2014); Social Patriot Movement (2018−2019); Party of the People (2021−2024)
- Domestic partner: Elena Novikova (2014)
- Education: University of Chile (BA)

Gaspar Alberto Rivas Sánchez (born 17 May 1978) is a Chilean lawyer and politician. Since March 2022, he has been a deputy of the Republic representing District 6 of the Valparaíso Region. He was a member of the Party of the People from 2021 until his expulsion in 2024.

He was a member of the National Renewal party between 2005 and 2014, and between 2010 and 2018 he was a deputy for the old district No. 11 of the Valparaíso Region. He also led the ultranationalist, neofascist, and far-right group Social Patriot Movement from May to October 2019.

Rivas has declared himself an admirer of Salvadorian president Nayib Bukele, even going as far as to call himself the "Chilean Bukele" or "The Sheriff of Chile", in reference to Bukele's positions regarding organized crime.

== Early & personal life ==
Rivas is the son of lawyer Gaspar Rivas Schulz and Virginia Sánchez Zañartu. He completed his basic and secondary education at the Chacabuco Institute in his hometown of Los Andes, in the Valparaíso Region. He then studied at the Faculty of Law of the University of Chile, where he graduated as a lawyer in 2005.

His undergraduate thesis was "The Economic Theory of Lord John Maynard Keynes and Its Practical Influence in the United States of America, Germany, and Chile", in which he particularly emphasized the economic achievements of Nazi Germany, stating that "Germany's success was simply due to the fact that it applied Keynesian theories without blemish and with total efficiency" (p. 123).

In 2014 he made public his sentimental relationship with the Ukrainian cyclist Elena Novikova, who he met through Facebook. Later, he traveled to Kiev to meet the cyclist in person, after which he returned with her to Chile. Their relationship ultimately did not prosper, with the cyclist returning to her country of origin to continue her career.

== Political career ==
In 2009 he was elected as deputy for the 11th district. In 2012, he resigned from the National Renovation party, due to his disagreements with the board chaired by Carlos Larraín. However, he returned to the party a few months later, and in June 2013 was ratified as the party's candidate for the parliamentary elections that year.

In 2018, he joined the Social Patriot Movement, a nationalist organization often declared by the media as "neo-Nazi", notable for its opposition to the so-called "gender ideology" and globalism. He was the president of the organization from May to October 2019, but ultimately abandoned it in October 2019 after the 2019 Chilean protests began.

In mid-2021, Rivas contacted presidential candidate Franco Parisi by telephone to discuss the possibility of competing on the parliamentary list of the Party of the People. In August of that year, he presented his candidacy for the Chamber of Deputies. of Deputies and Deputies by the District 6 in representation of the party. He was elected in the parliamentary elections with 14,851 votes and assumed office on 11 March 2022.

== Controversies ==
In April 2016, during a session of the Chamber of Deputies regarding a law about upping police security measures, Rivas referred to businessman Andrónico Lukšić Craig as a "delinquent" and "son of a bitch". Lukšić responded to the parliamentarian through a video on YouTube, where he summoned him to deliver the records he had against him to the courts, and analyzed the possibility of initiating legal action for said insults. Rivas did not retract his statements, for which Lukšić sued for insults against the deputy in May of that year, and in July the Court of Appeals of Santiago confirmed Rivas's immunity to face trial. On 19 December of the same year, the oral trial for the case began in the Justice Center of Santiago, occasion in which Lukšić was rebuked and attacked by protesters. On 28 December of that year, a sentence was issued, sentencing Rivas to 180 days of probation (which disabled him from exercising his parliamentary office) and the payment of a fine of 40 UTM (equivalent to about 2,400,000 CLP or 2.500 USD at the time).

In 2023, he was temporarily expelled from the Party of the People due to getting into conflicts and commonly insulting his peers, but this expulsion was later repealed.

== Ideology ==
Although Gaspar Rivas identifies with the Chilean right-wing in social values, he has been described as being more left-leaning in economic issues, advocating for a reform to the country's retirement pensions system and the nationalization of copper, Chile's main export. He has also advocated for reforming the Chilean education system, notably participating in the popularly-dubbed Penguin Revolution, even skipping congress to attend protests and rallies, even accompanying then-student leader and deputy Gabriel Boric, who would later become President of the Republic. He has also advocated for replacing the Chilean Constitution of 1980, established during a military dictatorship led by Augusto Pinochet.

A self-declared nationalist, he criticized the Chilean government for not "paying attention" to issues surrounding the indigenous Mapuche population, such as returning territories to their tribes, which he has advocated for. He has also supported a higher crackdown on illegal immigration and organized crime within his country, and the reintroduction of the death penalty.
