= Hualqui Station =

Railway station in Chile

Hualqui Station Estacion Hualqui
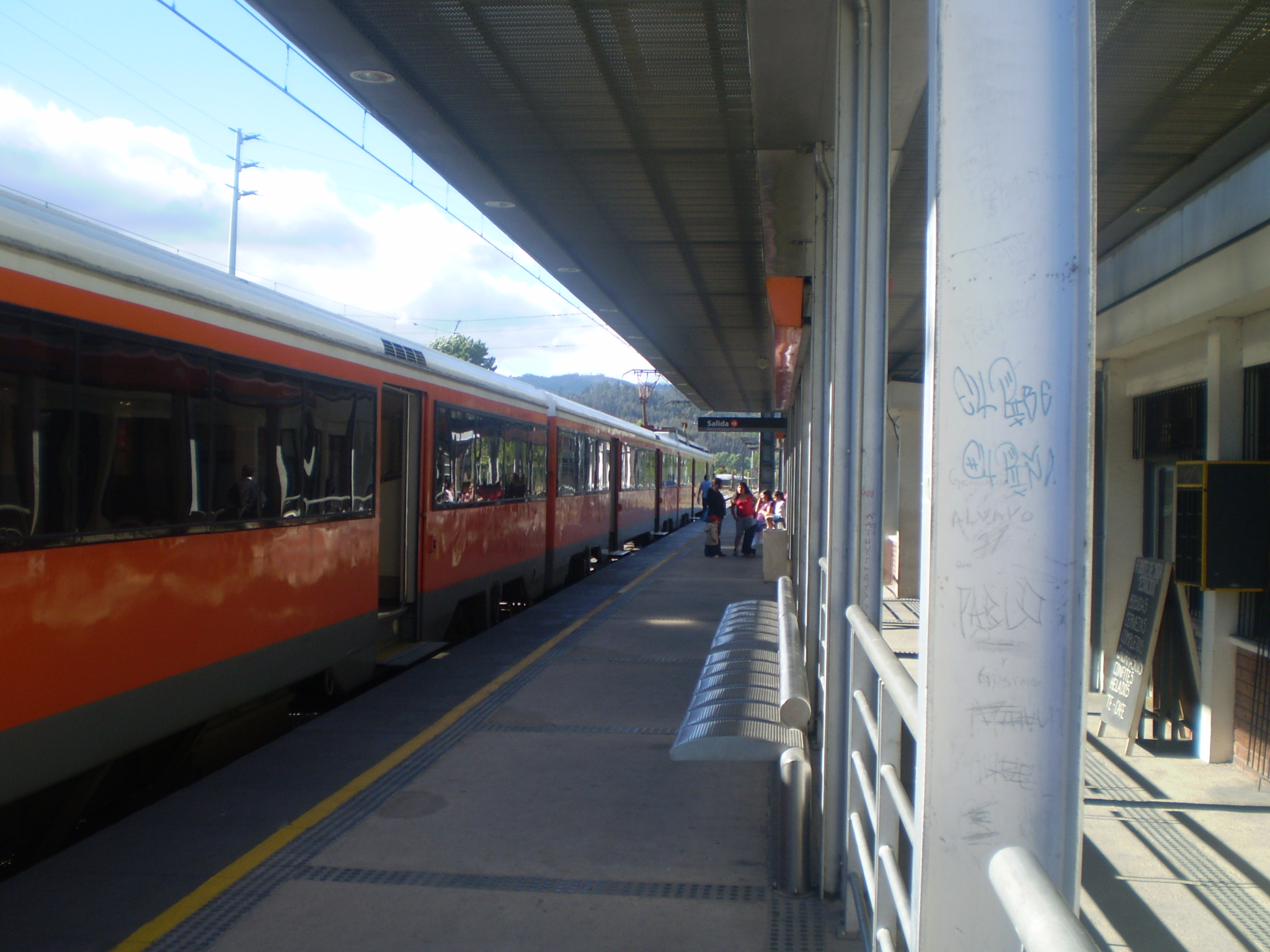

General information
- Location: Patricio Lynch; Bio-Bio Region; Chile
- Coordinates: 36°58′50″S 72°56′28″W
- Line: BioTren Line 1

History
- Opened: 1873
Location

Hualqui Station is a Rail station on the City of Hualqui, on the Bio-Bio Region of Chile. It is the Terminus station of Line 1 of the BioTren Service, which was inaugurated in March 2008, and an intermediate stop on the Tren Laja-Talcahuano Service. The station was inaugurated in 1873.
