= AES Railcar =

Passenger train in Chile

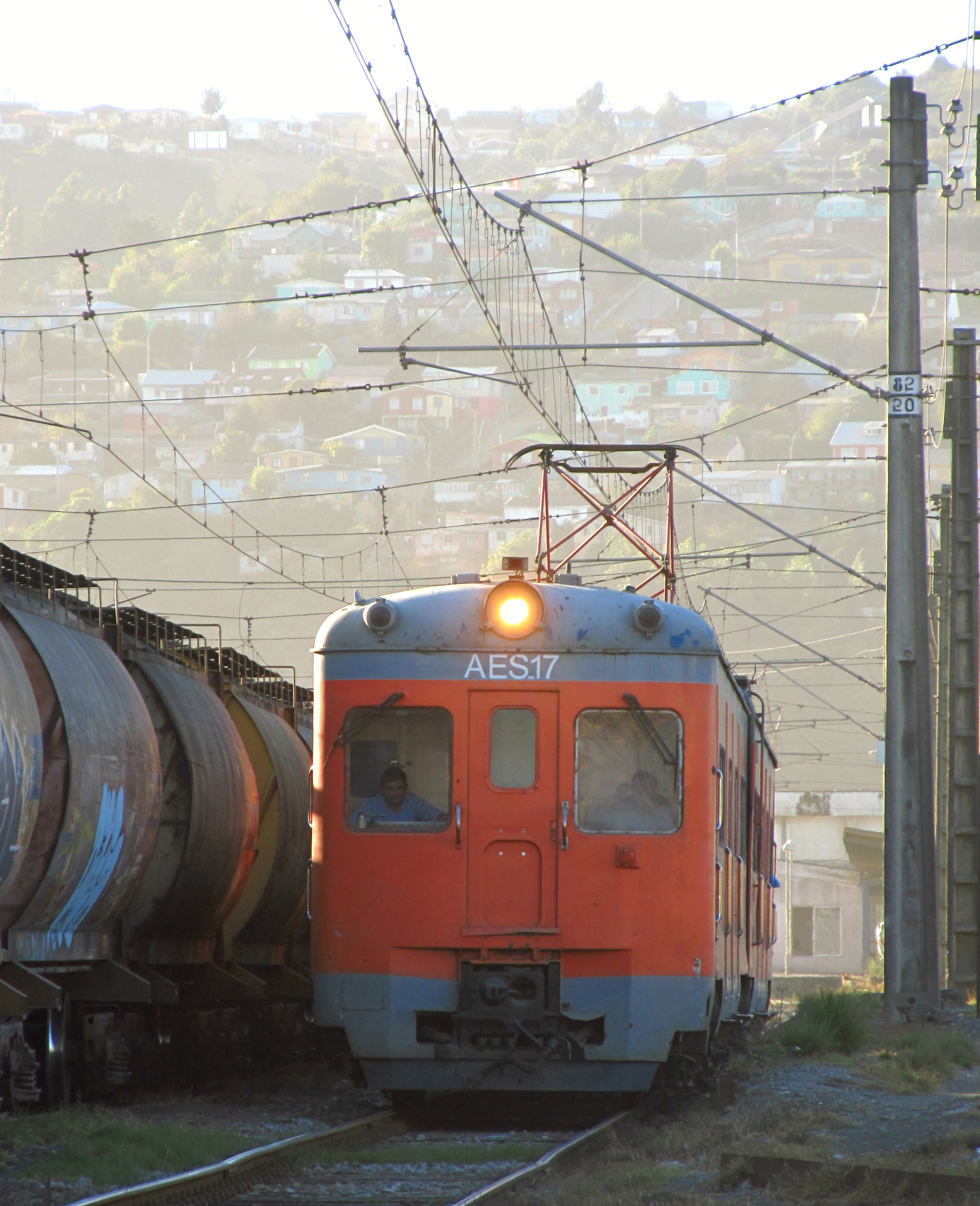
Type and origin
- Power type: Electric
- Builder: GEC; Fiat Concorde (FIAT MATERFER)
- Model: AES (Automotor Eléctrico Suburbano)
- Build date: 1976 - 1977
- Total produced: 20 units
Specifications
- Configuration
  - AAR: B-B+2-2
- Gauge: 5 ft 6 in (1,676 mm)
Performance figures
- Maximum speed: 130 km/h
- Power output: 1,500 hp (1,100 kW)
Career
- Locale: Chile

The AES (Automotor Eléctrico Suburbano) is an electric passenger railcar that has been in use in Chile since 1977, originally with Ferrocarril del Norte, and later for MERVAL, the Valparaíso region metro system.

== History ==
A total of 20 units, service numbers AES1 - AES20, have been built in Argentina by the English company GEC and Argentine company Fiat Concorde (FIAT MATERFER) between 1976 and 1977. Their main area of passenger service has been rapid suburban transit between Valparaíso and Limache, with extended service between Valparaíso and Santiago during the 1980s, and service on the Biotren in the South of Chile since the 2000s. Their maximum speed is 130 km/h (80 mph).

== Accidents ==
There was a major accident at the town of Queronque on February 17, 1986, involving two AES units. It was the largest railroad accident in the history of Chile.

Another three AES units were set on fire by terrorists.

== Recent development ==
In the early 2000s, the MERVAL gradually introduced the new UT440R (Unidad de Tren 440 Reformado) railcars, bought second-hand from Spain and refurbished. After operating side-by-side with the AES units for a brief period, they completely took over passenger service on June 30, 2005. On that day, AES 17 and AES 3 operated their last MERVAL revenue service between Puerto and Limache, in a large public event that included live music and celebrities. Although the change to the sophisticated, quieter, airconditioned and technologically advanced Alstom X'trapolis units has been met with a very positive public response, there are many Chileans who felt nostalgic about the AES trains that have been part of their daily lives for decades, in the future model AES train, used for the special tourist service "Memory Train".
