= District 6 (Chamber of Deputies of Chile) =

Electoral district of the Chamber of Deputies of Chile

- Distrito 6
- Electoral District for the Chamber of Deputies
- Location of District 6 within Chile
- Province: List: Los Andes; Marga Marga; Petorca; Quillota; San Felipe de Aconcagua; Valparaíso (part)
- Region: Valparaíso
- Population: 939,258 (2017)
- Electorate: 800,088 (2021)
- Area: 12,995 km^{2} (2020)

Current Electoral District
- Created: 2017
- Seats: 8 (2017–present)
- Deputies: List: Chiara Barchiesi (REP); María Francisca Bello (FA); Camila Flores (RN); Diego Ibáñez (FA); Andrés Longton (RN); Carolina Marzán (PPD); Gaspar Rivas (Ind); Nelson Venegas (PS)

District 6 (Spanish: Distrito 6) is one of the 28 multi-member electoral districts of the Chamber of Deputies, the lower house of the National Congress, the national legislature of Chile. The district was created by the 2015 electoral reform and came into being at the following general election in 2017. It consists of the provinces of Los Andes, Marga Marga, Petorca, Quillota and San Felipe de Aconcagua, and the communes of Puchuncaví and Quintero in the province of Valparaíso in the region of Valparaíso. The district currently elects eight of the 155 members of the Chamber of Deputies using the open party-list proportional representation electoral system. At the 2021 general election the district had 800,088 registered electors.

== Electoral system ==
District 6 currently elects eight of the 155 members of the Chamber of Deputies using the open party-list proportional representation electoral system. Parties may form electoral pacts with each other to pool their votes and increase their chances of winning seats. However, the number of candidates nominated by an electoral pact may not exceed the maximum number of candidates that a single party may nominate. Seats are allocated using the D'Hondt method.

== Election results ==
=== Summary ===
Election	Apruebo Dignidad AD / FA			Dignidad Ahora DA			New Social Pact NPS / NM			Democratic Convergence CD			Chile Vamos Podemos / Vamos			Party of the People PDG			Christian Social Front FSC		
Election	Votes	%	Seats	Votes	%	Seats	Votes	%	Seats	Votes	%	Seats	Votes	%	Seats	Votes	%	Seats	Votes	%	Seats
2021	77,503	21.81%	2	10,804	3.04%	0	81,559	22.95%	2				78,240	22.02%	2	43,097	12.13%	1	39,784	11.20%	1
2017	52,771	16.60%	1				76,371	24.03%	2	34,311	10.80%	1	123,235	38.77%	4						

=== Detailed ===
==== 2021 ====
Results of the 2021 general election held on 21 November 2021:

Party		Pact	Party									Pact		
Party		Pact	Votes per province						Total votes	%	Seats	Votes	%	Seats
Party		Pact	Los Andes	Marga Marga	Petorca	Quillota	San Felipe	Valpa- raíso (part)	Total votes	%	Seats	Votes	%	Seats
Party for Democracy	PPD	New Social Pact	1,571	12,315	2,956	10,366	6,635	1,927	35,770	10.07%	1	81,559	22.95%	2
Socialist Party of Chile	PS	New Social Pact	18,587	1,686	523	1,808	6,359	411	29,374	8.27%	1	81,559	22.95%	2
Christian Democratic Party	PDC	New Social Pact	438	6,365	3,386	2,499	958	415	14,061	3.96%	0	81,559	22.95%	2
Radical Party of Chile	PR	New Social Pact	425	534	94	199	105	63	1,420	0.40%	0	81,559	22.95%	2
Liberal Party of Chile	PL	New Social Pact	105	329	78	172	179	71	934	0.26%	0	81,559	22.95%	2
National Renewal	RN	Chile Podemos +	5,900	23,181	7,025	16,151	8,726	3,546	64,529	18.16%	2	78,240	22.02%	2
Independent Democratic Union	UDI	Chile Podemos +	1,440	5,697	1,066	2,629	2,292	587	13,711	3.86%	0	78,240	22.02%	2
Social Convergence	CS	Apruebo Dignidad	2,162	21,760	2,869	7,924	6,134	2,317	43,166	12.15%	2	77,503	21.81%	2
Communist Party of Chile	PC	Apruebo Dignidad	985	6,561	1,259	4,477	2,114	904	16,300	4.59%	0	77,503	21.81%	2
Democratic Revolution	RD	Apruebo Dignidad	536	4,156	3,806	2,244	1,008	590	12,340	3.47%	0	77,503	21.81%	2
Social Green Regionalist Federation	FREVS	Apruebo Dignidad	304	1,296	268	592	469	283	3,212	0.90%	0	77,503	21.81%	2
Comunes	COM	Apruebo Dignidad	79	1,456	263	343	217	127	2,485	0.70%	0	77,503	21.81%	2
Party of the People	PDG		6,824	13,822	2,311	9,350	8,472	2,318	43,097	12.13%	1	43,097	12.13%	1
Republican Party	REP	Christian Social Front	2,972	21,800	2,141	6,485	4,323	2,063	39,784	11.20%	1	39,784	11.20%	1
Humanist Party	PH	Dignidad Ahora	490	2,644	443	1,395	937	395	6,304	1.77%	0	10,804	3.04%	0
Equality Party	IGUAL	Dignidad Ahora	328	1,705	407	1,212	570	278	4,500	1.27%	0	10,804	3.04%	0
United Centre	CU	United Independents	976	5,633	815	2,704	1,593	917	12,638	3.56%	0	12,638	3.56%	0
Patriotic Union	UPA		772	2,419	708	1,896	1,315	494	7,604	2.14%	0	7,604	2.14%	0
Revolutionary Workers Party	PTR		333	1,379	386	1,086	642	276	4,102	1.15%	0	4,102	1.15%	0
Valid votes			45,227	134,738	30,804	73,532	53,048	17,982	355,331	100.00%	8	355,331	100.00%	8
Blank votes			2,185	7,044	3,028	5,902	4,684	1,875	24,718	6.15%				
Rejected votes – other			1,962	8,059	1,897	4,966	3,649	1,389	21,922	5.45%				
Total polled			49,374	149,841	35,729	84,400	61,381	21,246	401,971	50.24%				
Registered electors			92,615	292,869	73,407	172,964	126,305	41,928	800,088					
Turnout			53.31%	51.16%	48.67%	48.80%	48.60%	50.67%	50.24%					

The following candidates were elected: Chiara Barchiesi (REP), 24,614 votes; María Francisca Bello (CS), 8,741 votes; Camila Flores (RN), 16,480 votes; Diego Ibáñez (CS), 34,425 votes; Andrés Longton (RN), 29,169 votes; Carolina Marzán (PPD), 33,613 votes; Gaspar Rivas (PDG), 14,851 votes; and Nelson Venegas (PS), 25,452 votes.

==== 2017 ====
Results of the 2017 general election held on 19 November 2017:

Party		Pact	Party									Pact		
Party		Pact	Votes per province						Total votes	%	Seats	Votes	%	Seats
Party		Pact	Los Andes	Marga Marga	Petorca	Quillota	San Felipe	Valpa- raíso (part)	Total votes	%	Seats	Votes	%	Seats
National Renewal	RN	Chile Vamos	7,650	29,615	4,265	16,758	8,393	3,201	69,882	21.99%	3	123,235	38.77%	4
Evópoli	EVO	Chile Vamos	3,811	13,456	3,462	6,482	5,887	1,352	34,450	10.84%	1	123,235	38.77%	4
Independent Democratic Union	UDI	Chile Vamos	2,401	7,044	2,305	2,908	2,789	1,456	18,903	5.95%	0	123,235	38.77%	4
Socialist Party of Chile	PS	Nueva Mayoría	4,235	13,270	2,873	7,749	4,995	1,741	34,863	10.97%	1	76,371	24.03%	2
Party for Democracy	PPD	Nueva Mayoría	2,042	6,889	861	3,232	4,282	828	18,134	5.71%	1	76,371	24.03%	2
Social Democrat Radical Party	PRSD	Nueva Mayoría	2,675	2,077	682	3,861	3,430	482	13,207	4.16%	0	76,371	24.03%	2
Communist Party of Chile	PC	Nueva Mayoría	1,119	2,820	2,209	2,038	1,590	391	10,167	3.20%	0	76,371	24.03%	2
Humanist Party	PH	Broad Front	2,505	14,385	848	3,870	2,282	901	24,791	7.80%	1	52,771	16.60%	1
Citizen Power	PODER	Broad Front	1,038	5,361	503	2,283	1,505	486	11,176	3.52%	0	52,771	16.60%	1
Equality Party	IGUAL	Broad Front	825	3,948	1,726	1,950	1,194	594	10,237	3.22%	0	52,771	16.60%	1
Democratic Revolution	RD	Broad Front	611	3,613	272	1,022	743	306	6,567	2.07%	0	52,771	16.60%	1
Christian Democratic Party	PDC	Democratic Convergence	3,026	9,641	7,709	7,653	5,218	1,064	34,311	10.80%	1	34,311	10.80%	1
Progressive Party	PRO	All Over Chile	3,314	2,981	699	2,063	3,269	428	12,754	4.01%	0	12,754	4.01%	0
Amplitude	AMP	Sumemos	1,412	2,993	964	4,442	1,740	719	12,270	3.86%	0	12,270	3.86%	0
Patriotic Union	UPA		963	1,758	538	1,323	1,190	350	6,122	1.93%	0	6,122	1.93%	0
Valid votes			37,627	119,851	29,916	67,634	48,507	14,299	317,834	100.00%	8	317,834	100.00%	8
Blank votes			3,190	6,736	2,959	5,752	5,358	1,764	25,759	7.07%				
Rejected votes – other			2,735	7,062	1,496	4,497	3,705	1,292	20,787	5.70%				
Total polled			43,552	133,649	34,371	77,883	57,570	17,355	364,380	48.17%				
Registered electors			88,420	274,614	68,965	165,880	121,832	36,780	756,491					
Turnout			49.26%	48.67%	49.84%	46.95%	47.25%	47.19%	48.17%					

The following candidates were elected: Camila Flores (RN), 15,283 votes; Diego Ibáñez (PH), 9,185 votes; Pablo Kast (EVO), 28,465 votes' Andrés Longton (RN), 38,874 votes; Carolina Marzán (PPD), 14,422 votes; Luis Pardo Sainz (RN), 15,725 votes; Marcelo Schilling (PS), 20,072 votes; and Daniel Verdessi (PDC), 11,571 votes.
