= Chiara Barchiesi =

Chilean politician (born 1996)

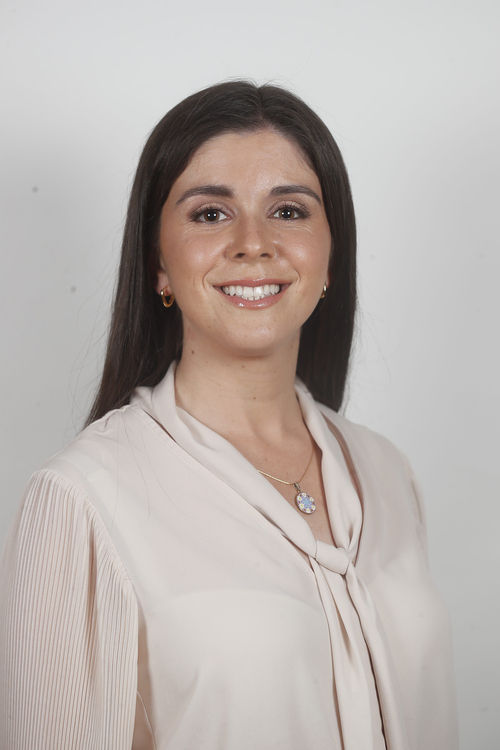

Member of the Chamber of Deputies
- Incumbent
- Assumed office 11 March 2022
- Constituency: District 6

Personal details
- Born: 22 December 1996 (age 29) Vina del Mar, Chile
- Party: Republican Party
- Parent(s): Antonio Barchiesi Ferrari; Verónica Chávez
- Relatives: Antonio Barchiesi (brother)
- Education: Pontifical Catholic University of Chile (BA) (MA)
- Occupation: Politician
- Profession: Agronomist

Chiara Natalia Barchiesi Chávez (born 22 December 1996) is a Chilean politician who currently serves as a member of the Chamber of Deputies of her country.

== Biography ==
Born in Viña del Mar, she is originally from Villa Alemana, in the Valparaíso Region. She is the daughter of Verónica Chávez Peirano and Antonio Barchiesi Ferrari, a Chilean of Italian immigrant descent, who served as a councillor for the Independent Democratic Union (UDI) in the municipality of Villa Alemana for three consecutive terms between 2008 and 2020, and was a founding member of the Republican Party of Chile. She was raised in a Catholic family of five siblings, including Antonio Barchiesi, former secretary-general of the Republican Party and former campaign manager for Senator Kenneth Pugh, as well as Angelo Barchiesi, a former candidate for mayor of the Municipality of Villa Alemana in the 2021 municipal elections.

She completed her secondary education at Colegio Champagnat of the Marist Brothers in Villa Alemana. She later moved to Santiago to pursue higher education, studying Agronomic Engineering at the Pontifical Catholic University of Chile, where she also completed a Master's degree in plant physiology and production between 2019 and 2020. During her university years, she was a member of the Guildism Movement at UC, running as a candidate in the FEUC elections in 2018 and losing in the second round to the centre-left New University Action (NAU) slate. She also served as a teaching assistant in the courses “Agricultural and Forestry Ethics” (2016–2017) and “Social Doctrine of the Church” (2019).

In 2020, she carried out a research stay at the University of Bologna in Italy for the development of her master’s thesis on volatile organic compounds produced by sage (Salvia officinalis) in grapevine (Vitis vinifera) Trebbiano Romagnolo.

== Political career ==
Chiara Barchiesi Chávez began her political trajectory as a territorial councillor at the Faculty of Agronomy and Forestry Engineering of the Pontificia Universidad Católica de Chile, representing the Movimiento Gremial. She also ran as a candidate for the Federación de Estudiantes de la Pontificia Universidad Católica de Chile (FEUC).

In 2019, she co-founded the Republican Party of Chile alongside José Antonio Kast. In May 2021, she ran for a seat in the Constitutional Convention representing the Republican Party within the Chile Vamos electoral pact, for the 6th electoral district of the Valparaíso Region. She obtained 10,235 votes (3.12%) and was not elected.

Following the constitutional convention elections, in August 2021 she registered her candidacy for the Chamber of Deputies of Chile representing the Republican Party within the Social Christian Front coalition, again in the 6th electoral district of the Valparaíso Region, for the 2022–2026 term. In the November 2021 parliamentary elections, she was elected deputy with 24,614 votes, corresponding to 6.93% of the valid votes cast.
