= Olmué Festival =

Olmué Festival Spanish: Festival del Huaso de Olmué
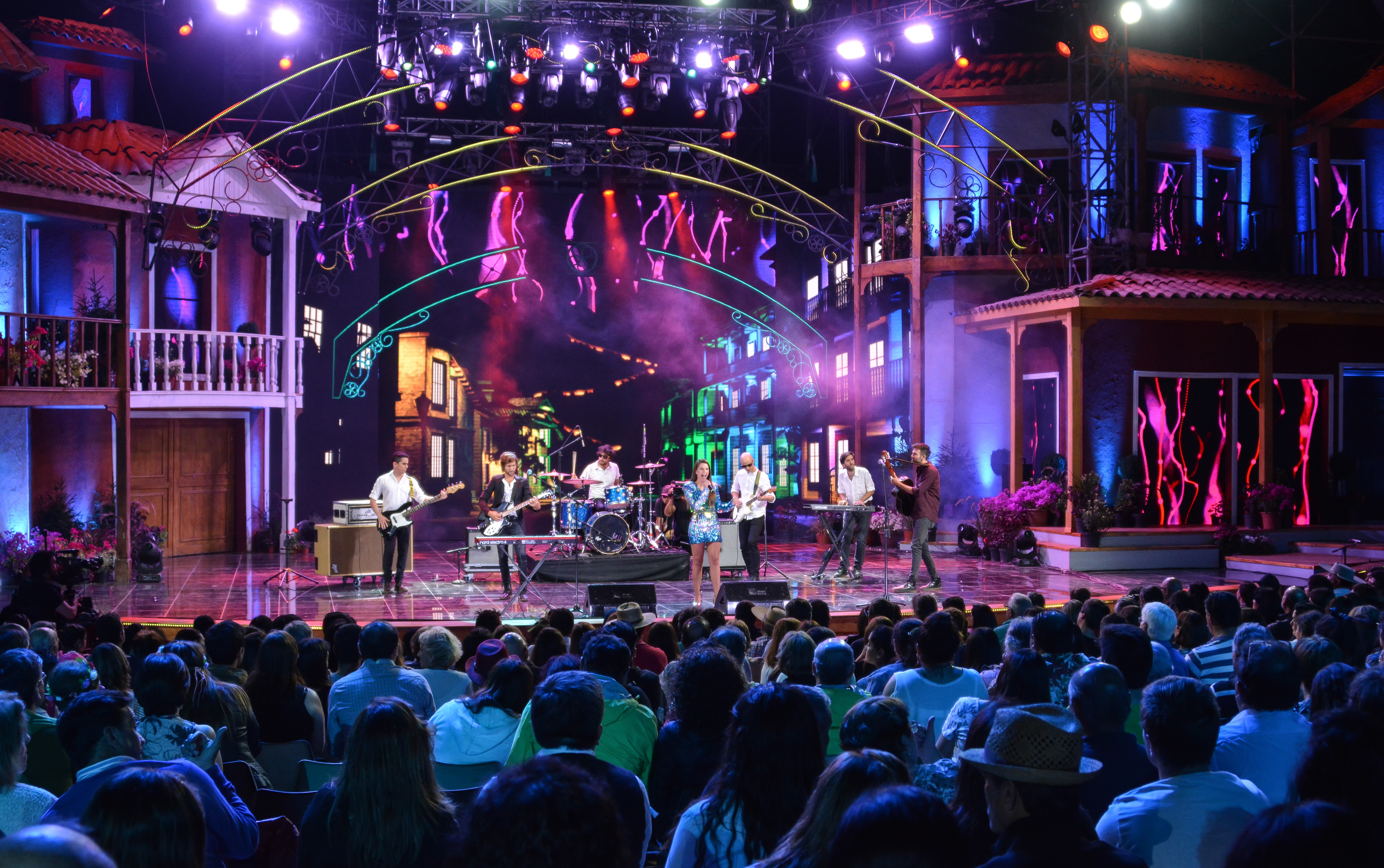
- Overture of the Olmué Festival (2018)
- Genre: Folk music Payada; Pop music
- Dates: 3rd week of January
- Locations: Olmué, Chile
- Years active: 1970-present

The Olmué Festival (Spanish: Festival del Huaso de Olmué) is a music festival that has been held annually during the 3rd week of February in Olmué, Central Chile. The first edition dates back to 1970 being televised for the first time in 1984. Relative to the Viña del Mar International Song Festival Olmué Festival is more oriented toward folk music. The 2021 edition was cancelled and it is possible that the same may also happen with the 2022 edition.

The festival has hosted acts such as Chico Trujillo and Álex Anwandter.
