= Luis Pardo Sainz =

Chilean politician

Luis Pardo
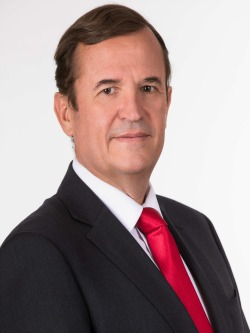

Member of the Chamber of Deputies
- Incumbent
- Assumed office 11 March 2026
- Constituency: District 6
- In office 11 March 2018 – 11 March 2022
- Preceded by: District created

Personal details
- Born: 13 December 1960 (age 65) Santiago, Chile
- Party: National Renewal
- Spouse: Mildred Peede
- Children: Four
- Education: Bernardo O'Higgins Military Academy; Diego Portales University (MA); Pompeu Fabra University (Ph.D)
- Occupation: Politician

Luis Rafael Pardo Sáinz (born 13 December 1960) is a Chilean politician.

In his capacity as president of Asociación de Radiodifusores de Chile (ARCHI), he regularly addressed the National Congress of Chile on legislation related to broadcasting, freedom of expression, and media economics, including bills on community radio, amendments to the General Telecommunications Law, alcoholic beverage advertising regulations, journalist statutes and press law, telecommunications infrastructure, transparency and access to information, and policies promoting national music.

As president of Asociación Internacional de Radiodifusión (AIR), Pardo held meetings with several Latin American heads of state to discuss freedom of expression and fundamental rights, including Felipe Calderón of Mexico, Luiz Inácio Lula da Silva of Brazil, Alan García of Peru, Óscar Arias of Costa Rica, Fernando Lugo of Paraguay, and Ollanta Humala of Peru.

== Biography ==
Luis Rafael Pardo Sainz was born in Viña del Mar on 13 December 1960. He is the son of Luis Pardo Gutiérrez and Pilar Sainz García. He completed his primary and secondary education at the Deutsche Schule Valparaíso between 1964 and 1976.

In 1976, he entered the Libertador Bernardo O'Higgins Military Academy, graduating in 1980 as an officer of the Chilean Army. He pursued a military career for approximately 13 years and retired while serving at the Cavalry School in Quillota, after which he shifted to a family-based agricultural project.

From 1989 onward, Pardo became a founder and director of radio and print media outlets in the Valparaíso Region and worked as a communications consultant and advisor. In parallel, he continued his academic training, completing a diploma in Management at the Universidad Adolfo Ibáñez in 1997 and a diploma in Neuro-Linguistic Programming at the Mariano Egaña University in 2000. In 2014, he obtained a master's degree in communication from the Diego Portales University and an additional master's degree in Strategic Communication Management from Pompeu Fabra University in Barcelona, Spain.

Alongside his professional career, he developed extensive business and professional association leadership. He served as director of the Chamber of Commerce of Valparaíso (1989–1994), director of the Quillota Agricultural Association (1992–1995), and held leadership roles within the ARCHI and the AIR.

== Political career ==
Before formally joining Renovación Nacional, Pardo focused on trade association leadership, while also participating in Senate campaigns for Sergio Romero Pizarro. Between 2005 and 2017, he served as president of ARCHI, and was president of the Chilean Federation of Social Communication Media during the periods 2006–2007, 2009–2010, 2012–2013, and 2016–2017.

From 2007 to 2013, he was president of AIR, an organization representing broadcasters from the Americas, Europe, and Asia. In this role, he engaged extensively in international advocacy for freedom of expression, holding meetings with senior officials of the Organization of American States, including the Secretary General and the Special Rapporteur for Freedom of Expression, in relation to media freedom issues in Venezuela and Ecuador. He also presented before the OAS Inter-American Commission on Human Rights on multiple occasions between 2009 and 2010 regarding the state of broadcasting and freedom of expression in Latin America.

His international activity included testimony before the Senate of Mexico in 2008 on that country's electoral reform, appearances before the Human Rights Commission of Mercosur in 2011 on threats to freedom of expression, and presentations between 2012 and 2013 before the Senate of Uruguay, the Supreme Court of Argentina as amicus curiae in constitutional litigation concerning media law, and the Mexican Senate on constitutional reforms related to telecommunications and freedom of expression. In 2014, he also appeared before the Constitutional Court of Chile during public hearings on reforms to the National Television Council and digital television legislation.

In August 2017, Pardo registered his candidacy for the Chamber of Deputies of Chile representing Renovación Nacional in the 6th electoral district of the Valparaíso Region. In the November elections, he was elected deputy with 15,725 votes, corresponding to 4.95% of the valid votes cast.

In August 2021, he ran for re-election in the same district representing Renovación Nacional within the Chile Podemos Más coalition. In the election held on 21 November 2021, he received 15,552 votes (4.38%) and was not re-elected.
