= Camila Flores =

Chilean politician

Member of the Senate
- Incumbent
- Assumed office 11 March 2026
- Constituency: 6th Circumscription

Member of the Chamber of Deputies
- In office 11 March 2018 – 11 March 2026
- Constituency: District 6

Personal details
- Born: 9 February 1987 (age 39) Paillaco, Chile
- Party: Renovación Nacional (2005–present)
- Spouse(s): Percy Marín (div.) (2017–2026)
- Education: Andrés Bello National University (LL.B)
- Occupation: Politician
- Profession: Lawyer

Camila Alejandra Flores Oporto (Paillaco, 9 February 1987) is a lawyer and politician from Chile, currently serving as a Member of Parliament.

She has been affiliated with Renovación Nacional (RN) since 2005. Elected to Congress in 2018, she presently serves as a Deputy of the Republic, representing the 6th District of the Valparaíso Region for the 2018–2022 and 2022–2026 legislative terms.

Flores has voiced her esteem for the Armed Forces of Chile and for the institutional legacy of Augusto Pinochet, whilst also making clear her condemnation of human rights abuses.

She has been a hard-liner on criminal justice, public security, and bioethical policy. She has also served on environmental and natural-resource committees, contributing to investigations into pollution incidents affecting the municipalities of Quintero, Concón and Puchuncaví.

== Biography ==
She is the daughter of David Flores Godoy and Verónica Oporto González, originally from Nontuelá, a village in southern Chile. Her family came from a rural background devoted to agriculture and was affected by expropriations during the government of the Popular Unity (UP), which she has said shaped her political outlook.

She completed her secondary education at the Manuel de Salas High School in Casablanca, graduating in 2004, and went on to study law at the Andrés Bello University campuses in Viña del Mar and Santiago. For her bachelor’s degree in legal sciences, she wrote a dissertation entitled Constitutionalisation of Civil Law. On 22 July 2010, she received the “Academic Excellence Award” at her graduation ceremony.

She was admitted to the bar on 20 January 2012.

In 2017 she married law graduate Percy Marín Vera (b. 1969), then Regional Councillor for the Marga Marga Province in Valparaíso. They have one daughter.

In November 2021, following the birth of her daughter by caesarean section, she suffered an intestinal complication that developed into sepsis, leading to hospitalisation at Clínica Ciudad del Mar. She later spoke publicly about her recovery, raising awareness of postnatal depression and the importance of family and medical support.

=== Professional career ===
She has practised law independently, principally in environmental matters. Between 2012 and 2013, she worked as an adviser to the National Directorate of Gendarmería de Chile and as Chief of Staff to its national director, remaining there until May 2014.

In June 2014, she joined the Municipality of Cerro Navia, serving as Deputy Director of the Community Development Division (DIDECO).

== Political career ==
Flores joined RN at the age of 18, inspired by Andrés Allamand and Alberto Cardemil. Within the National Renewal Youth (JRN), she served as district president and national councillor.

In August 2017, she registered her candidacy for the Chamber of Deputies of Chile, representing the newly created District No. 6 of the Valparaíso Region, and was elected for the 2018–2022 term.

During that term, she sat on the Permanent Commission on Constitution, Legislation and Justice; the Water Resources and Desertification Committee; and the Emergency, Disaster and Firefighters Committee. She also formed part of the RN Parliamentary Caucus. During this legislature she built international links, engaging with figures such as Eduardo Bolsonaro.

Re-elected in 2021 for the 2022–2026 term, she has since served on the Standing Committees for Constitution, Legislation, Justice and Regulation; National Defence; and Emergency, Disaster and Firefighters.

Within the National Defence Committee she has contributed to initiatives modernising the State Intelligence System, and examining Chile’s strategic defence capabilities. She has participated in debates on budgetary allocations and summoned officials from the Ministry of National Defence to report on the execution of resources and defence-related programmes.

In 2026, Flores was elected to the Senate.
