= Limache =

City and commune in Chile

- City and commune
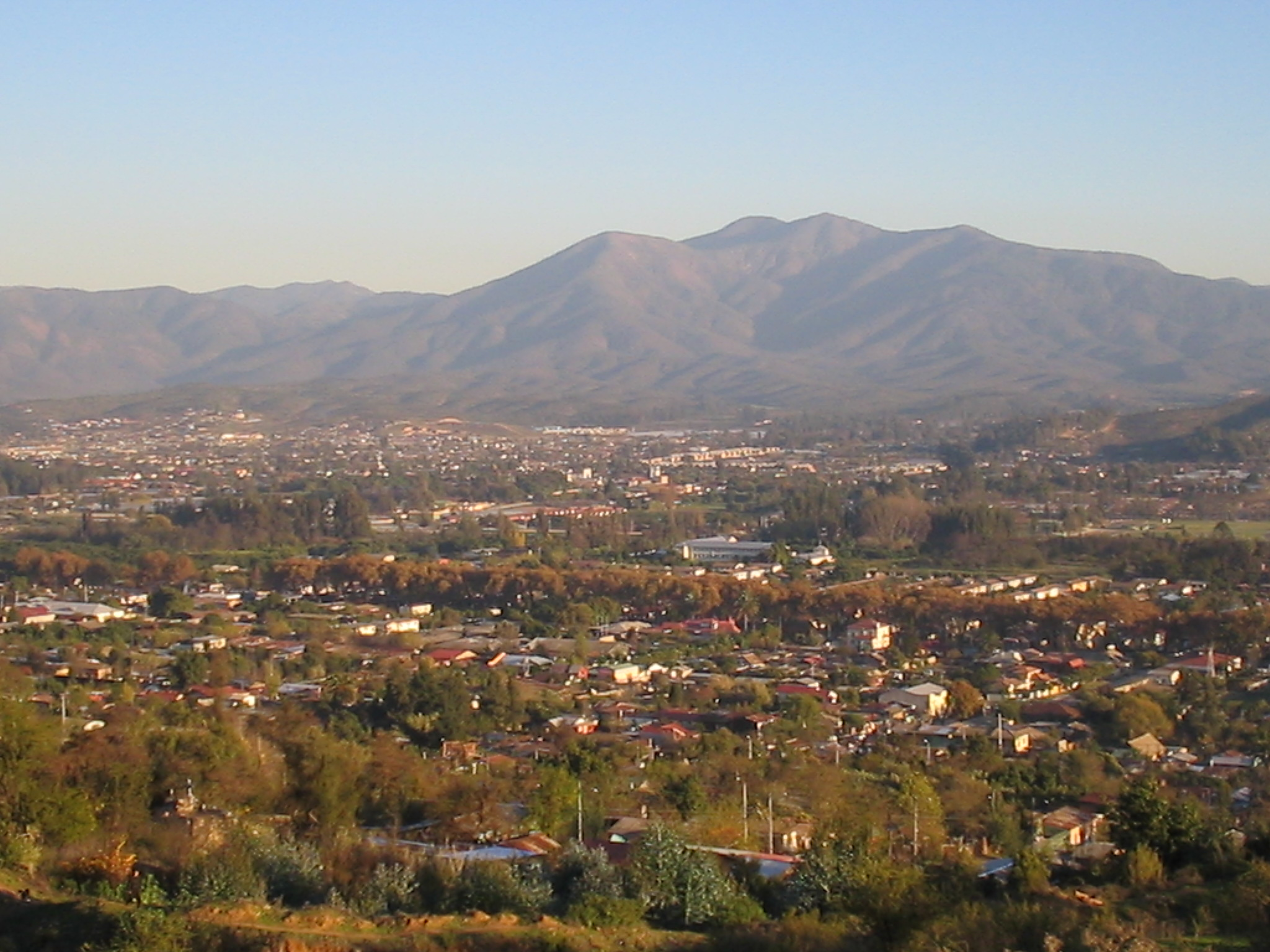
- Limache

- Coat of arms Location in Chile
- Coordinates (city): 33°01′S 71°16′W
- Country: Chile
- Region: Valparaíso
- Province: Marga Marga

Government
  - Type: Municipality
  - Mayor: Luciano Valenzuela (Ind./RN)

Area
  - Total: 293.8 km^{2} (113.4 sq mi)
- Elevation: 377 m (1,237 ft)

Population (2017 Census)
  - Total: 46,121
  - Density: 157.0/km^{2} (406.6/sq mi)
  - Urban: 39,169
  - Rural: 6,952
- Demonym: Limachino

Sex
  - Men: 22,353
  - Women: 23,768
- Time zone: UTC-4 (CLT)
  - Summer (DST): UTC-3 (CLST)
- Area code: +56 32
- Website: Official website (in Spanish)

Limache is a town and commune in Marga Marga Province, Valparaíso Region, Chile. It is the only Chilean commune with two urban areas: San Francisco de Limache on the north side of the Pelumpén stream, and Limache Viejo on the south. Limache is well-known in Chile for its production of tomatoes, as well as the annual celebration of its patron saint known as the Virgin of the 40 Hours.

== Geography ==
Limache spans an inland area of 293.8 km^{2} (113 sq mi) in Chile's Zona Central, located 43 km (27 mi) east of the port city of Valparaíso and 103 km (64 mi) northwest of the national capital of Santiago.

== Demographics ==
According to the 2017 census of the National Statistics Institute Limache has 46,121 inhabitants (22,353 men and 23,768 women). Of these, 39,169 (84.9%) lived in urban areas and 6,952 (15.1%) in rural areas. The population grew by 17.6% (6,902 persons) between the 2002 and 2017 censuses.

== Administration ==
As a township, Limache is a third-level administrative division of Chile administered by a municipal council, headed by a mayor who is directly elected every four years. The 2024–2028 mayor is Luciano Valenzuela Romero (Ind./RN). The current municipal council has the following members:

- Victoria Ladrón de Guevara Astudillo (REP)
- Alexis Ahumada Gómez (UDI)
- Danilo Sandoval Sarabia (Ind./UDI)
- Matías Irarrázabal Gutiérrez (RN)
- Paula Abarca Carrizo (Ind./RN)
- Álvaro Zamora Pérez (PS)

Within the electoral divisions of Chile, Limache is represented in the Chamber of Deputies by Benjamín Lorca (REP), Luis Pardo (RN), Javier Olivares (PDG), Cristian Mella (DC), Nelson Venegas (PS), Chiara Barchiesi (REP), Francisca Bello (FA), and Sofía González (PC) for the 2026–2030 term, as part of the 6th electoral district. The commune is represented in the Senate by Arturo Squella (REP), Andrés Longton (RN), Diego Ibáñez (FA), Camila Flores (RN), and Karol Cariola (PC) for the 2026–2034 term, as part of the 6th senatorial constituency (Valparaíso region).

== Culture ==
The Feast of the Virgin of the 40 Hours (La Fiesta de la Virgen de las 40 Horas) begins in Limache 40 hours before the last Sunday in February with masses every hour, culminating on Sunday with a procession through the city.

== Notable people ==
- Alfredo Calderón (born 1986), footballer
