= Biotren =

Commuter rail system in Concepción, Chile

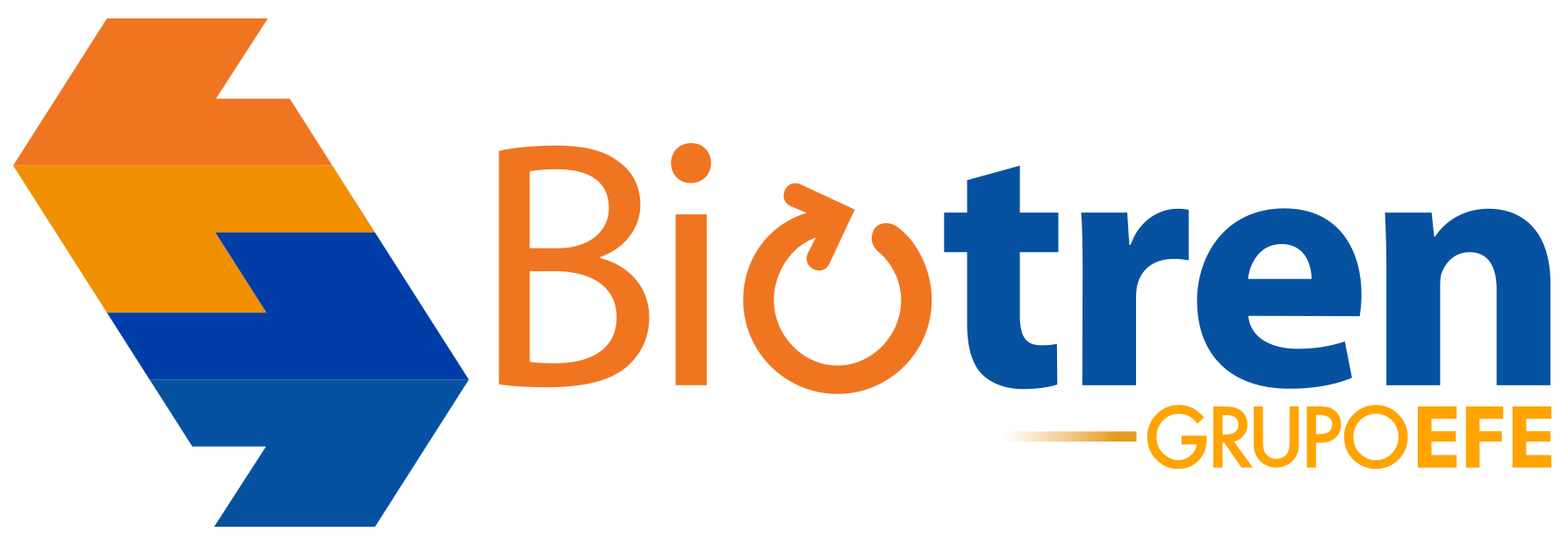

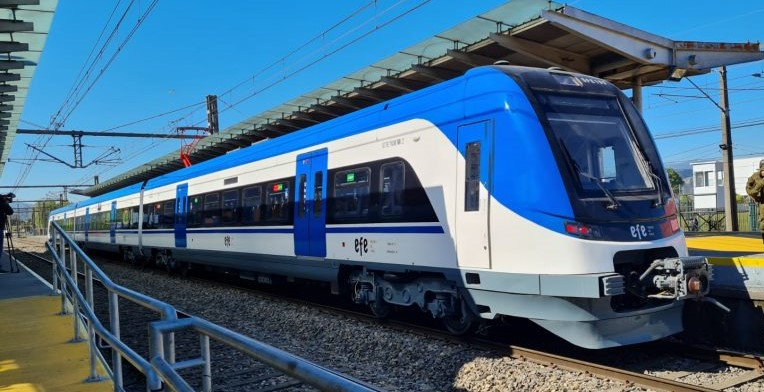

Overview
- Locale: Greater Concepción
- Transit type: Commuter rail / Rapid transit
- Number of lines: 2
- Number of stations: 25
- Daily ridership: 24,500 daily (2019)
- Website: https://www.efe.cl/nuestros-servicios/biotren/

Operation
- Began operation: 1 December 1999
- Operator: Ferrocarriles del Sur S.A.

Technical
- System length: 66.6 km (41.4 mi)
- Track gauge: 1,676 mm (5 ft 6 in)
- Electrification: 3000V DC catenary
System map

Biotren

Service
- Rolling stock: UT-440 series RENFE Class 440

Biotrén symbol

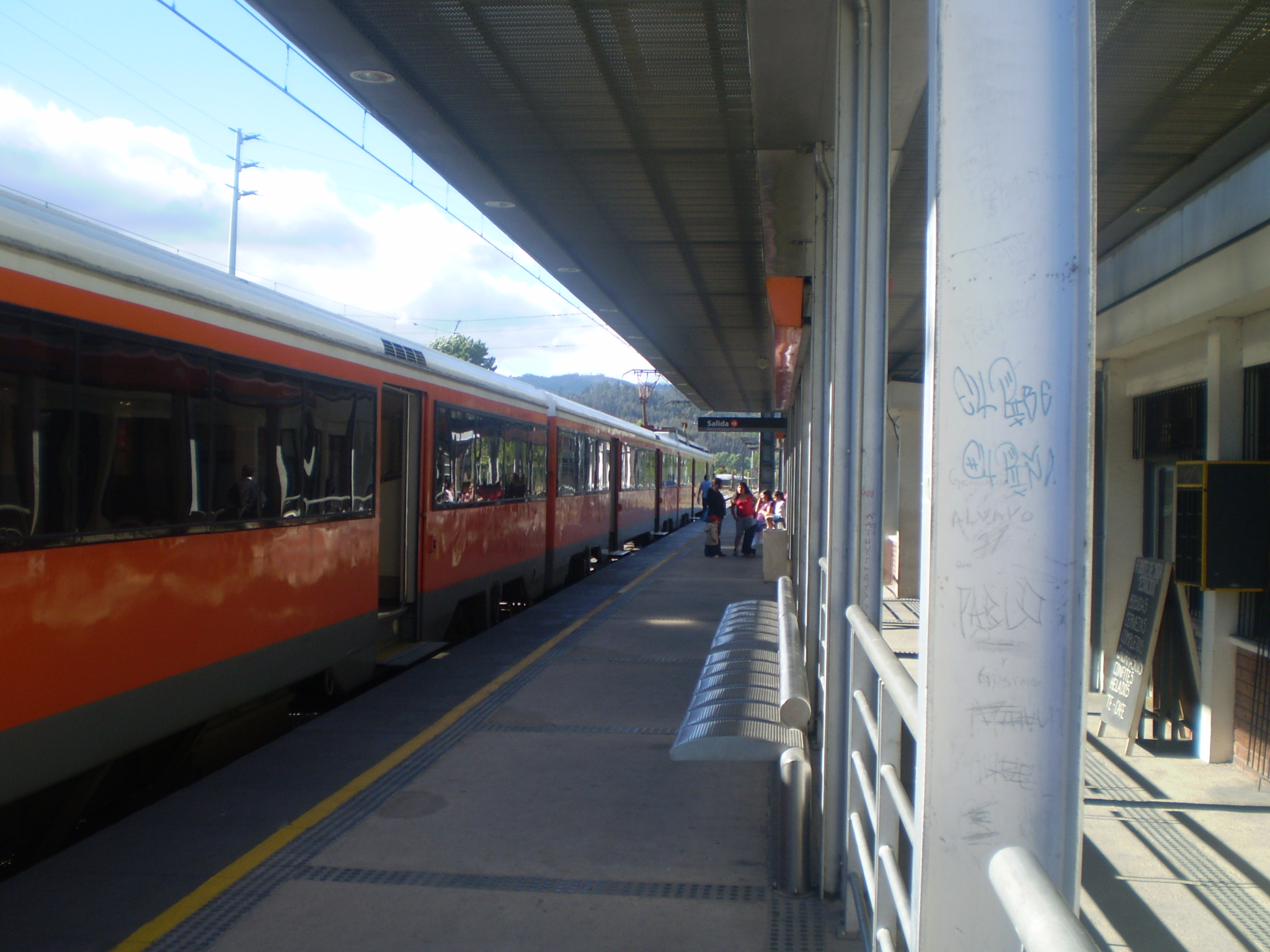
A former UT 440 "Modelo Concepción" unit at Hualqui station, Región del Biobío.

The Biotren (Spanish: Biotrén) is an at-grade urban commuter rail system that serves a large part of the city of Concepción, Chile, capital of the region of Bío-Bío, also known as Greater Concepción or Concepción Metropolitan Area, both synonyms of "city" according to the urbanistic standards and laws of Chile, of which this city is the second biggest, most populous and important of the country. Biotren connects the boroughs or comunas of Concepción Centro (downtown borough), Talcahuano, Hualpén, San Pedro de la Paz, Chiguayante and Hualqui. The system is managed by Ferrocarriles Suburbanos de Concepción S.A. (Fesub), which name comes from the former metrorail system of the city and is a subsidiary of Empresa de los Ferrocarriles del Estado (EFE), Chilean State Railways. Biotren is part of the Plan and Authority of Integrated Transit of Concepción, Biovías.

The system was partially inaugurated on 24 November 2005 in a ceremony that counted with the presence of the then President of Chile, Ricardo Lagos.

== History ==
The first commuter rail service in Greater Concepción was inaugurated on 1 December 1999, running between El Arenal and Valle del Sol stations, using Japanese-built AEL Electric Multiple Units. The service was extended to Hualqui in 2001, adding four more stations, and in 2005 the service would be rebranded as Line 1 of the Biotren, a rebranding of the commuter rail system under the 2Biovías" project by then Chilean president Ricardo Lagos. A second Line between Concepción station and Lomas Coloradas in San Pedro de la Paz opened the same year, and it was during this time that the old Japanese-built AEL and AES units being replaced by refurbished UT440 units previously operated by Renfe in Spain. In 2014, Line 2 was extended to Alborada station, and in 2016 it was extended again to Coronel, containing 14 stations in total, with a proposed extension to Lota adding up to five more.

== San Pedro de la Paz Accident ==
On 1 September 2023, one of the trains operating on line 2 collided with a passenger bus in a level crossing in San pedro de la Paz, killing 8 people.

== Architecture ==
Biotren stations or Bio Stations have a totally renewed architecture compared to the former system. The platforms have roofs and access for the handicapped. The fare is paid at the entrance and exit of the stations using a prepayment card called Biovías, with a deferred payment system according to the distance travelled. The card's recharge can be made in any station.

== Rolling stock ==
The Empresa de Los Ferrocarriles del Estado (EFE) invested a total of US $16.800.000 for the trains used in the system. The current fleet is composed of eight trains UT-440 Modelo Concepción of three wagons each, bought from the Red Nacional de Ferrocarriles Españoles (Spain State Railways, RENFE). The trains are painted orange and have 321 seats (20 folding seats) and a capacity of 590 passengers.

== Lines ==
=== Line 1 ===
Line 1: It crosses all Concepción from North to South, from "Mercado" Terminus Station (Port of Talcahuano) to "Hualqui" Terminus Station (Hualqui).

Bio Stations:

- Mercado
- El Arenal
- Hospital Higueras
- Los Cóndores
- Universidad Técnica Federico Santa María
- Lorenzo Arenas
- Concepción
- Chiguayante
- Pedro Medina
- Manquimávida
- Leonera
- Hualqui

=== Line 2 ===
Line 2: It crosses the Bío-Bío river on the upgraded Puente Ferroviario (Railroad Bridge) Bío-Bío, the longest of its kind in Chile. The line starts, from downtown to west side, in the "Concepción" Exchange (or Intermodal) Station (Civic District, Concepción Centro) and ends in the "intermodal coronel" Terminus Station (comuna de Coronel).

Bio Stations:

- Concepción
- Juan Pablo II
- Diagonal Bío-Bío
- Alborada
- Costa Mar
- El Parque
- Lomas Coloradas
- Cardenal Raúl Silva Henríquez
- Hito Galvarino
- Los Canelos
- Huinca
- Cristo Redentor
- Laguna Quiñenco
- Coronel

== Exchange System ==
The Exchange or Intermodal Bio Stations have personal bicycle parking lockers for those who arrive by cycle paths (except for El Arenal) to take the Biotren and synchronization with combination buses called Biobuses.

== See also ==
- List of suburban and commuter rail systems
- Metrotrén
