= Petorca Province =

Petorca Province Provincia de Petorca
- Province
- Seal

- Location in the Valparaíso Region

- Location in Chile
- Coordinates: 32°22′S 71°06′W
- Country: Chile
- Region: Valparaíso
- Capital: La Ligua
- Communes: List of 5: La Ligua; Cabildo; Zapallar; Papudo; Petorca

Government
  - Type: Provincial
  - Presidential Provincial Delegate: Luis Soto Pérez (Ind.)

Area
  - Total: 4,588.9 km^{2} (1,771.8 sq mi)
  - Rank: 1

Population (2012 Census)
  - Total: 72,286
  - Rank: 7
  - Density: 15.752/km^{2} (40.798/sq mi)
  - Urban: 50,289
  - Rural: 20,321

Sex
  - Men: 35,647
  - Women: 34,963
- Time zone: UTC-4 (CLT)
  - Summer (DST): UTC-3 (CLST)
- Area code: 56 +
- Website: Delegation of Petorca

Petorca Province (Spanish: Provincia de Petorca) is one of eight provinces of the central Chilean region of Valparaíso (V). Its capital is the city of La Ligua.

== Administration ==
As a province, Petorca is a second-level administrative division, governed by a provincial delegate who is appointed by the president.

=== Communes ===
The province comprises five communes (Spanish: comunas), each governed by a municipality consisting of an alcalde and municipal council:

- La Ligua
- Cabildo
- Zapallar
- Papudo
- Petorca

== Geography and demography ==
The province spans an area of 4,588.9 km^{2} (1,772 sq mi), the largest in the Valparaíso Region. According to the 2002 census, Petorca is the second least populous province in the region under Isla de Pascua (Easter Island) with a population of 70,610. At that time, there were 50,289 people living in urban areas, 20,321 people living in rural areas, 35,647 men and 34,963 women.
