= Olmué =

- Commune
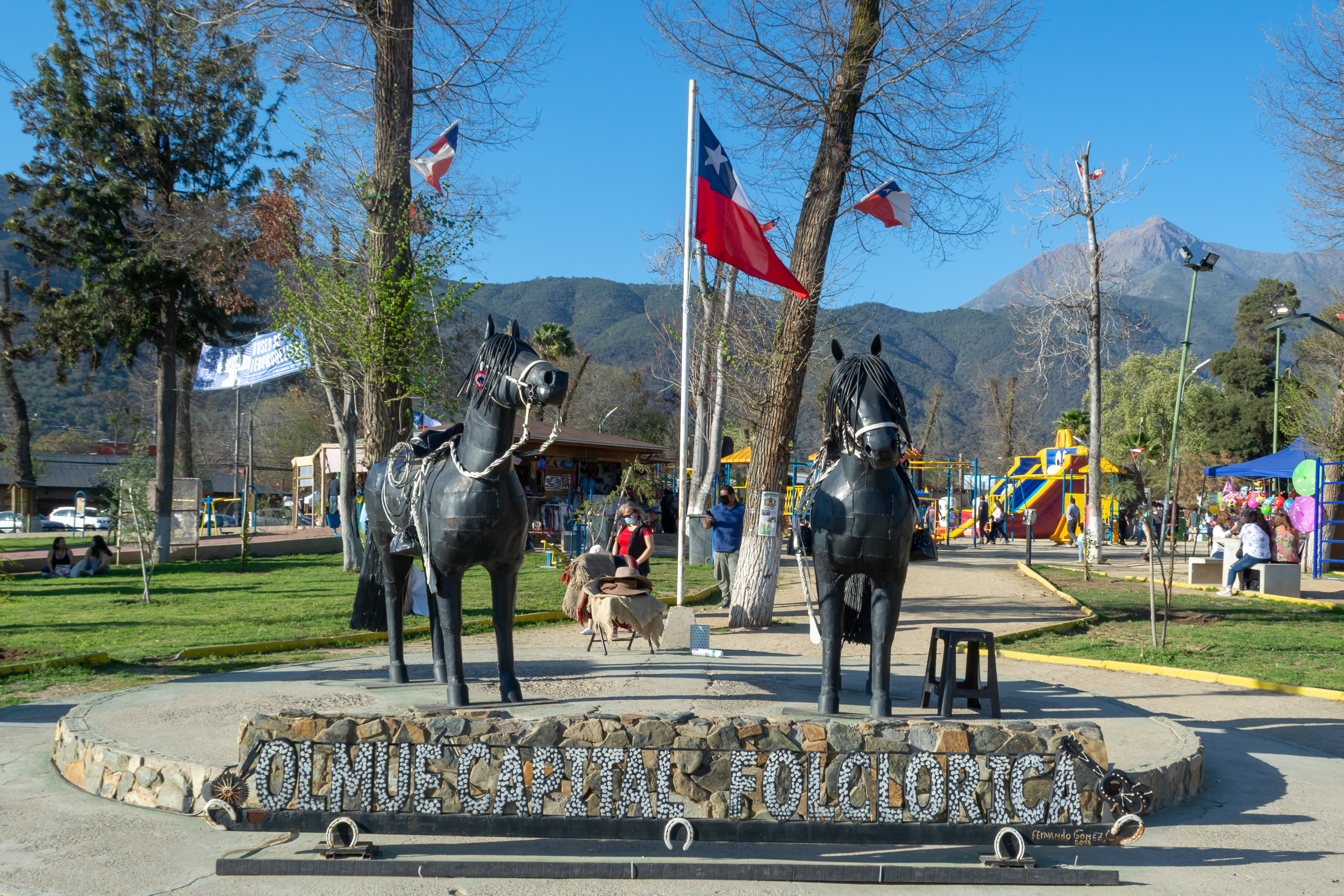

- Coat of arms Location in Chile
- Nickname(s): Capital Folclórica de Chile ("Folk Capital of Chile")
- Coordinates: 32°59′43″S 71°11′08″W
- Country: Chile
- Region: Valparaíso
- Province: San Antonio

Government
  - Type: Municipality
  - Alcalde: Jorge Jil Herrera (Ind.)

Area
  - Total: 231.8 km^{2} (89.5 sq mi)
- Elevation: 144 m (472 ft)

Population (2024 census)
  - Total: 19,778
  - Density: 85.32/km^{2} (221.0/sq mi)
- Demonym(s): Olmueíno, -a

Sex
  - Men: 9,668
  - Women: 10,110
- Time zone: UTC-4 (CLT)
  - Summer (DST): UTC-3 (CLST)
- Area code: 56 + 33
- Website: Municipality of Olmué

Olmué is a Chilean town and commune located in the Marga Marga Province, Valparaíso Region. The commune spans an area of 231.8 km^{2} (89 sq mi). Olmué is located 42.8 miles northwest of Santiago and 42 kilometers east northeast of Valparaíso.

The commune was created on October 14, 1893, on land that had belonged to the former Hacienda de Gulmué, owned by Mariana de Osorio, who granted part of her land to the original inhabitants who worked on the estate.

Its economy is mainly based on tourism, driven by the presence of natural landscapes, campgrounds, inns, and countryside activities. Within its territory lies La Campana National Park, declared a World Biosphere Reserve by UNESCO.

Olmué is recognized for the Festival del Huaso de Olmué, a televised music festival that promotes Chilean folk-root music and annually brings together national and international artists, along with a competition of original songs.

== Toponymy ==
The name Olmué comes from the Mapudungun words wülngu (“huilmo”) and we (“place, site”), meaning “place of huilmos.”

When adapted into Spanish, it gave rise to the name of the “Gulmué” estate, owned by Mariana de Osorio, widow of Don Alonso de Rivera y Figueroa, where the town of Olmué would later be established.

== History ==
=== Origins ===
The history of this commune dates back to around the year 1400, when troops sent by the Inca Huayna Cápac arrived and established several mitimae colonies, though they did not alter the way of life or the language of the native inhabitants.

Years later, the Spanish conquistador Pedro de Valdivia crossed this valley leading his men toward the founding of Santiago, turning its mountain ranges into the usual route between Valparaíso and Santiago—what we now know as La Dormida, so called because it served as a resting place for travelers.

=== Gulmué estate ===
General Alonso de Riveros y Figueroa received, as an encomienda from the King of Spain through the Governor of Chile Alonso de Sotomayor, the lands that today correspond to the commune of Olmué, in recognition of services rendered to the Crown. On these lands, he established a country house and assigned the local Picunche people to agricultural work. After his death, his wife, Mariana de Osorio, inherited the Gulmué estate, becoming its owner.

On May 26, 1612, Mariana de Osorio decided through a will to donate the lands to the Indigenous people who worked for her:

Primeramente mando se les entregue la estancia de Gulmué, la que al presente tengo, de la cual les hago gracia i donación para mis indios, para ellos i sus mujeres, hijos i descendientes (...) Encargo la conciencia del Sr. Fiscal que lo fuere a quien mueve el mirar por el aumento i bien de estos pobres naturales i al protestar que lo fuere que no consienta que ninguno, no permitan que nadie se les entrometa en la estancia mientras no sean herederos, ni deber enajenar el ganado, ni menos la estancia para que se sustente, acudiéndoles a todos por iguales partes, fines para todos igualmente i sin su consentimiento, nadie puede sembrar ni ocupar las tierras con ganado ni sementeras para granjerías sólo para el sustento hubieren de sembrar, sea sin perjuicio de mis indios, prefiriéndoles siempre las mejores tierras (...) Les hago donación de ella, de modo que nadie pueda quitárselas ni los Ministros de su Majestad, ni enajenarlos a nadie por merced que les hago a mis herederos.

“First, I order that the Gulmué estate, which I currently own, be delivered to them, which I grant and donate to my Indians, for them and their wives, children, and descendants (...) I charge the conscience of the Lord Prosecutor who may be responsible to look after the welfare and growth of these poor natives, and I declare that no one shall interfere with the estate while they are heirs to it, nor shall the livestock or the estate be alienated so that it may sustain them. They shall all benefit equally and no one may sow or occupy the lands with livestock or crops for profit—only for sustenance—without prejudice to my Indians, always granting them preference to the best lands (...) I donate it in such a way that no one may take it from them, not even the Ministers of His Majesty, nor transfer it to anyone else, as this is the grant I make to my heirs.”

The donation of the estate was carried out almost in its entirety, except for a small portion that included a house, a mill, and an orchard intended for one of her relatives. According to historical records, Mariana de Osorio maintained a respectful relationship with the local Picunche population. From this transfer, a community was formed, initially composed of Indigenous people under the encomienda system, which through inheritance processes passed on to mestizo descendants. Over time, the Indigenous village disappeared, giving rise to a community that remains in existence to this day.

=== The visit of Charles Darwin ===
On August 17, 1834, Olmué was visited by the English naturalist Charles Darwin, who climbed Cerro La Campana and was left in awe upon seeing both the Andes mountain range and the Pacific Ocean from the same point.

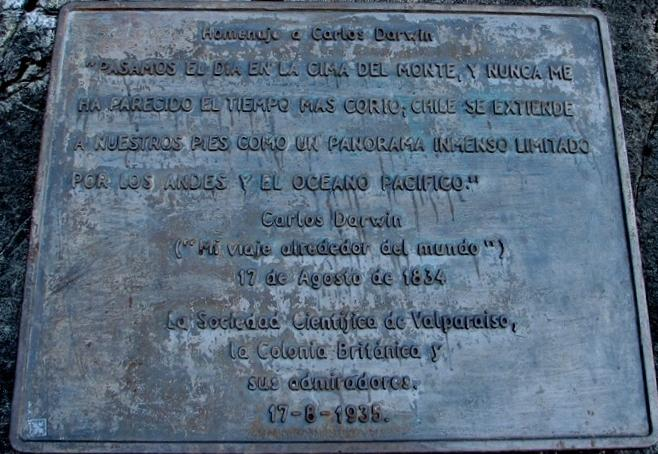
Commemorative plaque marking Charles Darwin’s ascent of Cerro La Campana

In his book The Voyage of the Beagle, Charles Darwin describes the following:

We climbed the immense blocks of greenstone that crown the summit of the mountain. As often happens, these crags are split and broken into considerable angular fragments. I noticed, however, a very remarkable circumstance: that the surfaces of the fractures showed every degree of freshness; one might have said that some of the blocks had been broken the day before; others, on the contrary, displayed still tender lichens, and on others very ancient mosses were growing (...) We spent the day on the summit of the mountain, and never did time seem to me so short. Chile, bounded by the Andes and the Pacific Ocean, stretched at our feet like a vast plain. The spectacle itself, along with the many reflections suggested by the view of La Campana and the parallel chains, as well as the broad valley of Quillota that cuts them at right angles.

In commemoration of Charles Darwin’s expedition, various memorial landmarks have been installed in the commune of Olmué. In 1935, the Scientific Society of Valparaíso, together with the British colony residing in Chile, erected a commemorative plaque at the summit of Cerro La Campana. Likewise, at one of the entrances to La Campana National Park, there is a sculpture of the naturalist that recalls his passage through the area.

=== Foundation ===
On October 14, 1893, the President of the Republic, Jorge Montt Álvarez, enacted Supreme Decree No. 199, through which the commune of Olmué was created. Its first mayor was Juan Crisóstomo Toledo, who held the position for nearly 27 years.

In 1927, following the restructuring of the country’s political-administrative division promoted during the government of Carlos Ibáñez del Campo, Olmué was annexed to the commune of Limache. Later, thanks to efforts by local residents, town meetings, and formal petitions to the authorities, the commune regained its autonomy on January 18, 1966, when President Eduardo Frei Montalva enacted Law No. 16,422, which restored its municipality, appointing Hugo Quinteros Venegas as mayor.

== Demographics ==
According to the 2024 census of the National Statistics Institute, Olmué has 19,778 inhabitants (9,668 men and 10,110 women). Olmué accounts for 1.04% of the regional population.

== Administration ==
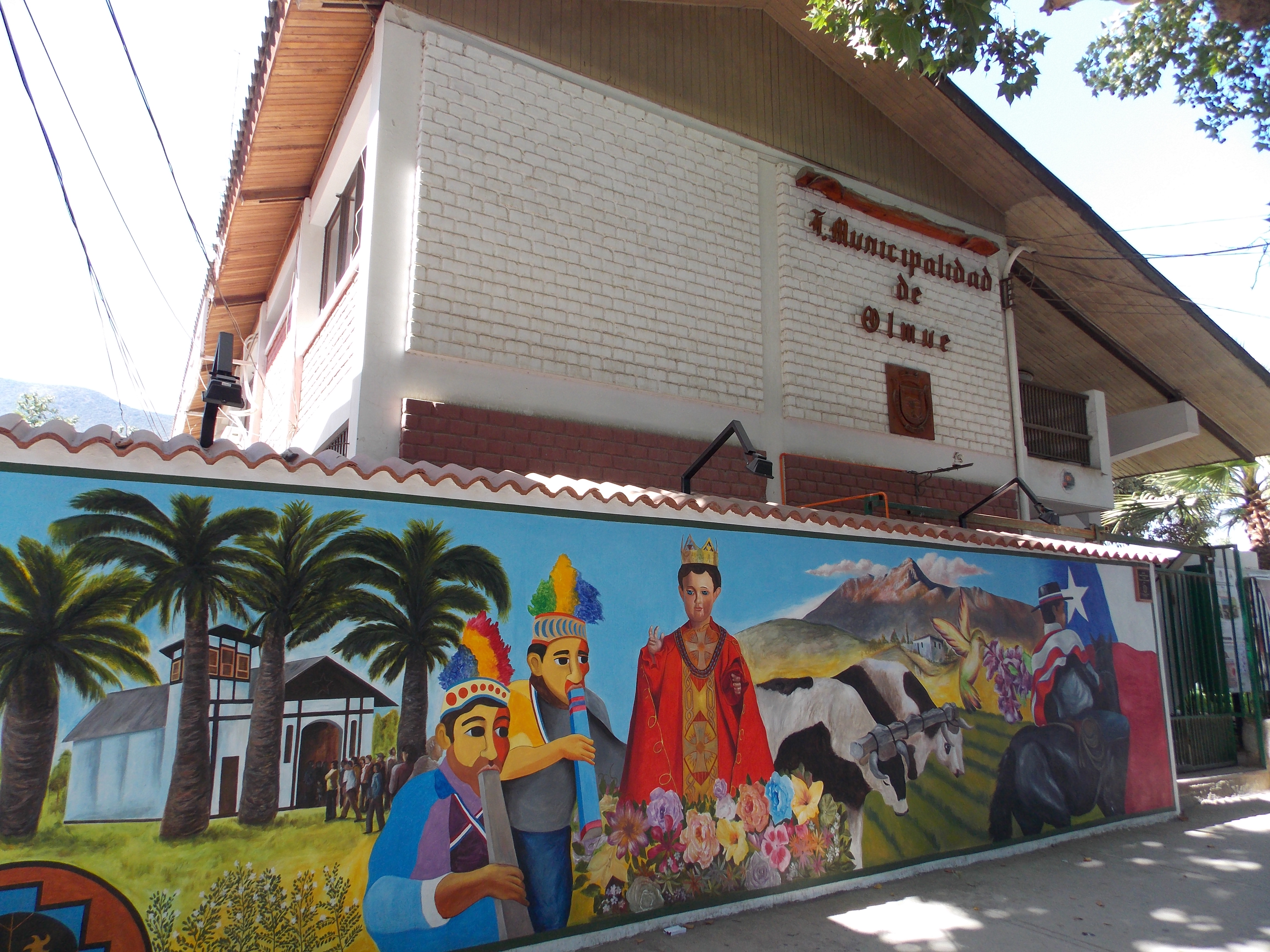

As a commune, Olmué is a third-level administrative division of Chile administered by a communal council, headed by an alcalde who is directly elected every four years. The current alcalde is Jorge Jil Herrera (Ind.). The communal council has the following members:

- Patricia Arancibia Gómez (RN)
- Trinidad Cisternas Gutiérrez (PRCh)
- Sebastián Guajardo Caneo (Ind./PR)
- Diego Umaña Esteban (Ind./PP)
- Tomas Aranda Miranda (DC)
- Beatriz Apablaza Martínez (UDI)

Olmué belongs to Electoral District No. 6 and the 7th Senatorial Constituency (Valparaíso).

It is represented in the Chamber of Deputies of the National Congress by Diego Ibáñez Cotroneo (CS), Carolina Marzán Pinto (PPD), Andrés Longton Herrera (RN), Nelson Venegas Salazar (PS), Chiara Barchiesi Chávez (PRCh), Camila Flores Oporto (RN), Gaspar Rivas Sánchez (PDG), and María Francisca Bello (CS).

In the Senate, it is represented by Ricardo Lagos Weber (PPD), Isabel Allende Bussi (PS), Juan Ignacio Latorre Rivero (RD), Kenneth Pugh (RN), and Francisco Chahuán Chahuán (RN).

Olmué is represented in the Valparaíso Regional Council by the councilors of Marga Marga: María Rubilar Muñoz (FA), Emmanuel Olfos Vargas (Ind.-RN), Elsa Bueno Cortés (PRCh), and Cristián Fuentes Duque (PRCh).

== Places of interest ==
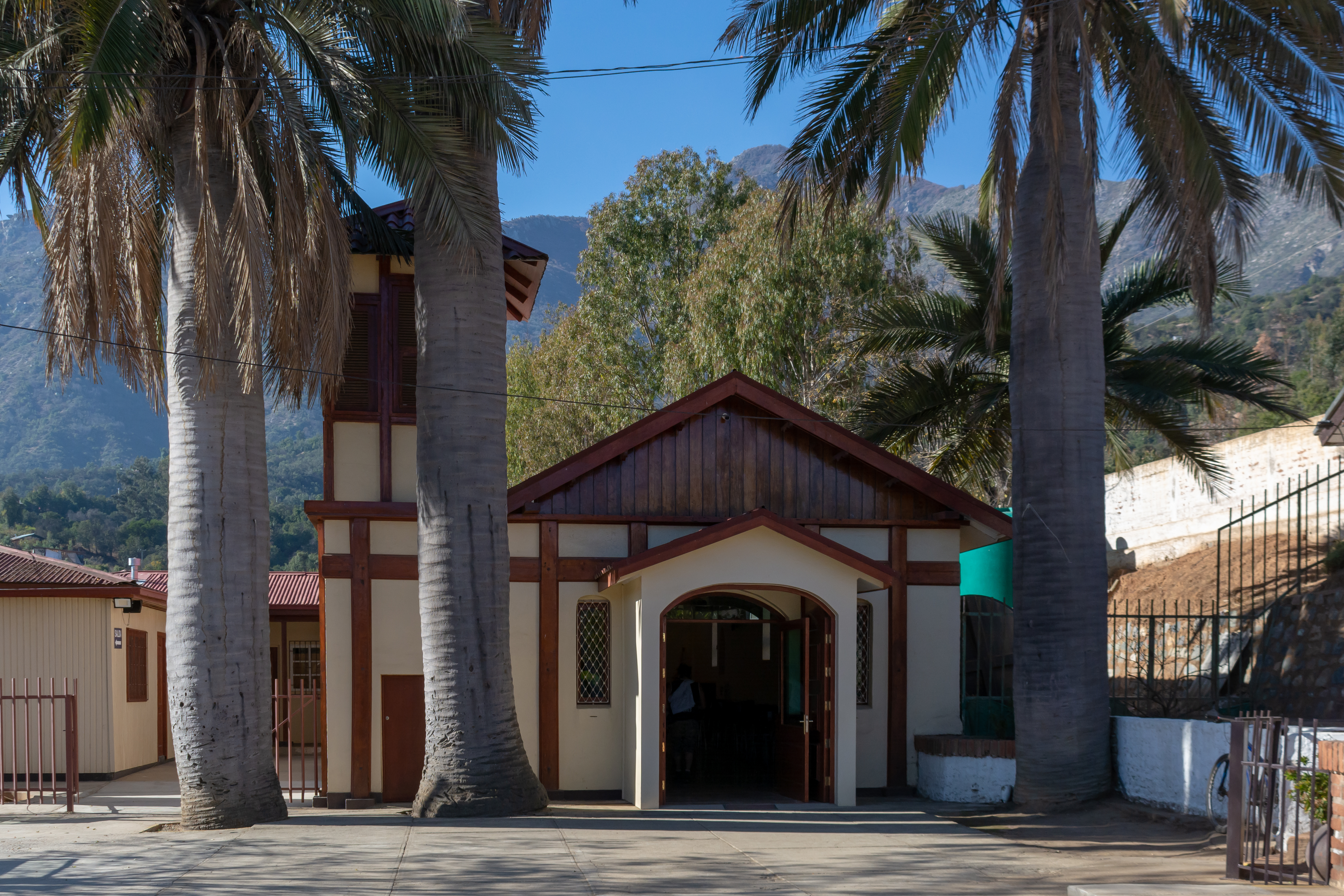
Santuario del Niño Dios de Las Palmas, Olmué in 2023

Among the commune’s tourist attractions is the Chapel of La Dormida, declared a National Monument and located in the La Dormida sector, about 17 km from the city center.

Another important site is the Santuario del Niño Dios de Las Palmas, home to one of the commune’s most significant religious icons.

Also located nearby is La Campana National Park, an area rich in native trees and local wildlife.

In addition, in January 2021 a route called the “Camino del Brujo” was inaugurated. It allows visitors to travel from the commune’s center to the Granizo sector, where an open-air museum highlights rural life traditions and various artistic works.

== Transportation ==
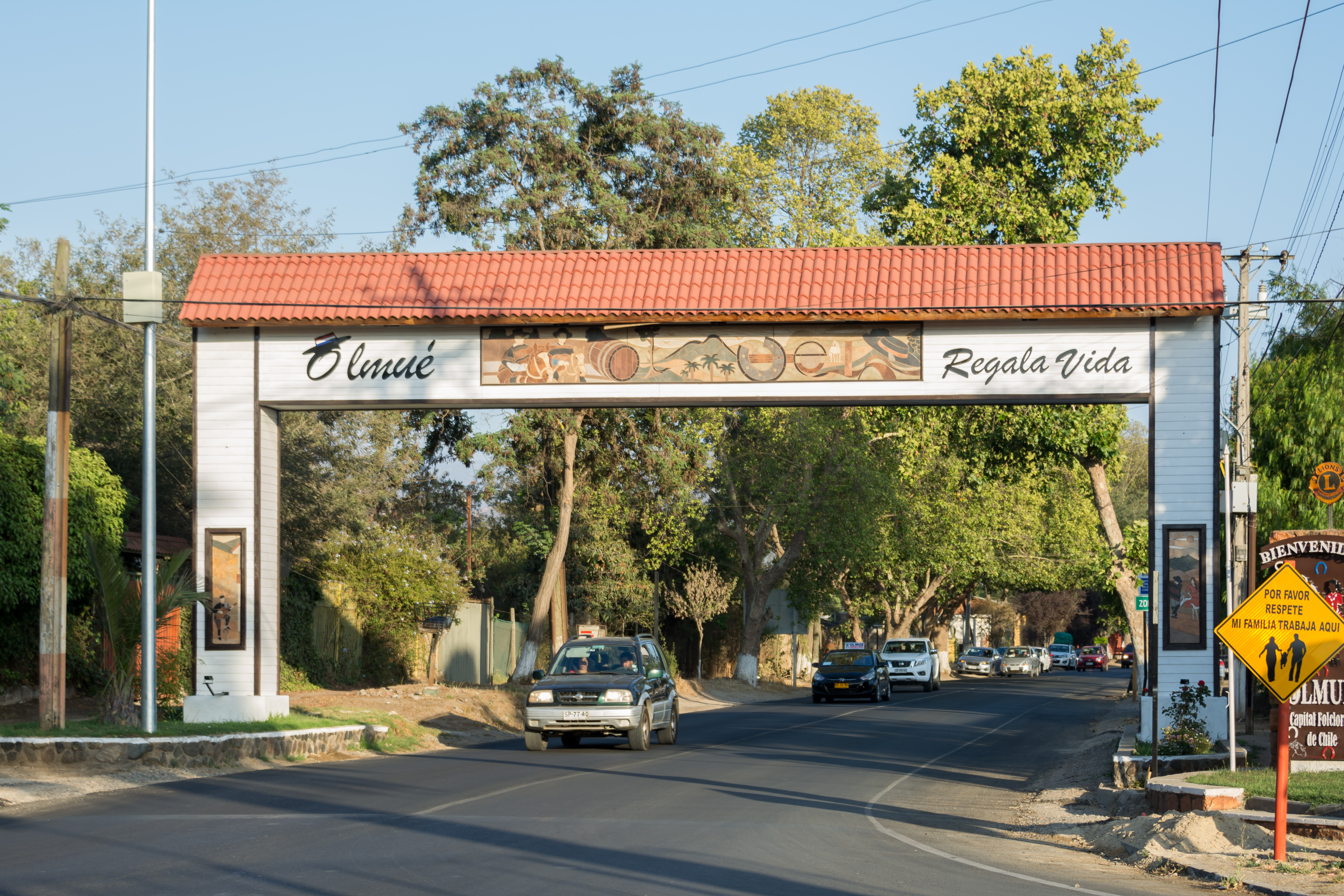
Entrance to Olmué from the commune of Limache

The commune of Olmué is located 12 km from Limache and 60 km from Valparaíso. From the city of Santiago, it can be reached via the La Dormida Pass (Cuesta de La Dormida), which connects the city with Tiltil.

From the regional capital and other coastal towns (Central Coast), access is available via the Troncal Highway, which links Valparaíso with La Calera. From there, you enter Olmué through Limache, along Eastman Avenue.

Local public transportation operates along key streets such as Eastman Avenue, Granizo Avenue, and Diego Portales Street. It also serves rural areas including Las Palmas, Quebrada de Alvarado, La Dormida, and La Vega, among others.
