= Marga Marga =

Marga Marga Province Provincia Marga Marga
- Province
- Seal

- Location in the Valparaíso Region

- Location in Chile
- Coordinates: 33°01′S 71°17′W
- Country: Chile
- Region: Valparaíso
- Capital: Quilpué
- Communes: List of 4: Quilpué; Villa Alemana; Limache; Olmué

Government
  - Type: Provincial
  - Presidential Provincial Delegate: Fidel Cueto Rosales (Socialist Party)

Area
  - Total: 1,159.0 km^{2} (447.5 sq mi)
  - Rank: 6

Population (2012 Census)
  - Total: 325,207
  - Rank: 2
  - Density: 280.59/km^{2} (726.73/sq mi)
  - Urban: 267,022
  - Rural: 10,503

Sex
  - Men: 133,605
  - Women: 143,920
- Time zone: UTC-4 (CLT)
  - Summer (DST): UTC-3 (CLST)
- Area codes: +56-32 (Quilpué and Villa Alemana) +56-33 (Limache y Olmué)
- Website: Delegation of Marga Marga

Marga Marga Province (Spanish: Provincia de Marga Marga) is one of the eight provinces in the central Chilean region of Valparaíso (V). Its capital is the city of Quilpué.

== History ==
The province was created by Law 20,368 on August 25, 2009, and it became operative on March 11, 2010. This law incorporated two communes (comunas) from Valparaíso Province to the south, Quilpué and Villa Alemana, together with two communes from Quillota Province to the north, Limache and Olmué, to form the new province.

== Administration ==
As a province, Marga Marga is a second-level administrative division, governed by a provincial delegate who is appointed by the president.

=== Communes ===
The province comprises four communes, each governed by a municipality consisting of an alcalde and municipal council:

- Quilpué (capital)
- Villa Alemana
- Limache
- Olmué

== Geography and demography ==
The province spans a landlocked area of 1,159.0 km^{2} (447 sq mi), making it the sixth largest of Valaparíso Region's eight provinces. According to the 2002 census, which was conducted before the province came into law, the sum of Marga Marga's communes was 277,525 persons, making it the second most populous province in the region after Valparaíso Province. At that time, there were 267,022 people living in urban areas, 10,503 people living in rural areas, 133,605 men and 143,920 women.
