= Villa Alemana =

City in Chile

- City and commune
- Flag Coat of arms Location in Chile
- Coordinates (city): 33°02′32″S 71°22′24″W
- Country: Chile
- Region: Valparaíso
- Province: Marga Marga
- Founded: 4 November 1894

Government
  - Type: Municipality
  - Mayor: Nelson Estay (Ind./RN)

Area
  - Total: 97 km^{2} (37 sq mi)
- Elevation: 143 m (469 ft)

Population (2024 Census)
  - Total: 139,571
  - Density: 1,400/km^{2} (3,700/sq mi)

Sex
  - Men: 65,629
  - Women: 73,942
- Time zone: UTC-4 (CLT)
  - Summer (DST): UTC-3 (CLST)
- Area code: (country) 56 + (city) 32
- Website: www.villalemana.cl (in Spanish)

Villa Alemana (Spanish pronunciation: [ˈbiʝaleˈmana]; "German Village" in English) is a city and commune in central Chile. It was founded in 1896 by Italian and German immigrants. Villa Alemana is a part of the urban area known as Greater Valparaiso.

Villa Alemana's flag is notable for having the flag of the German Empire banded on it, along with the Flag of Germany.

== History ==
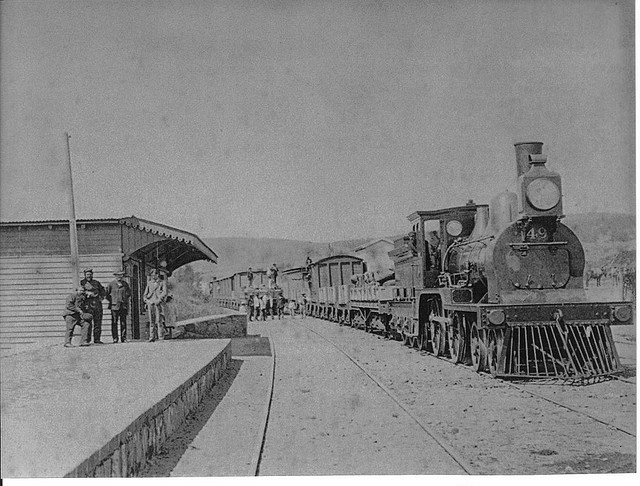
Villa Alemana train, 1880

Villa Alemana was founded at the beginning of a Chilean railway development. Its climate is so temperate that the slogan is "The City of Eternal Youth" ("La ciudad de la eterna juventud" in Spanish) or "City of the Mills" ("Ciudad de los Molinos" in Spanish).

There was originally nothing but fields as well as a small vineyard, trees and flowers, dominated by hawthorn trees (Crataegus). Where the Theater Pompeya stands today, land was offered for 20 cents per meter. And that was where Don Buenaventura Joglar had the idea to buy land and build a population which he named Villa Alemana, as German emigrants were the first to buy these sites.

On 8 November 1894, it was founded under the name of Viña Miraflores. The property was owned by Don Buenaventura Joglar, who divided the land into lots and set the name of Villa Alemana.

On 5 January 1918, the commune of Villa Alemana was established, but in 1928 it was incorporated in Quilpué. On 7 June 1933, Villa Alemana separated from Quilpué, recreating the commune of Villa Alemana. Today, it is a bedroom community for Viña del Mar and Valparaíso.

== Demographics ==
According to the 2024 census of the National Statistics Institute, Villa Alemana spans an area of 96.5 km^{2} (37 sq mi) and has 139,571 inhabitants (65,629 men and 73,942 women). The population grew by 10.3% (13,023 persons) between the 2017 and 2024 censuses.

== Administration ==
As a commune, Villa Alemana is a third-level administrative division of Chile administered by a municipal council, headed by a mayor who is directly elected every four years. The 2024-2028 mayor is Nelson Estay Molina (Ind./RN). The council has the following members:

- Alejandro Gazmuri Sanhueza (REP)
- Jeannette Lizana Díaz (REP)
- Daniel Erraz Levaggi (REP)
- Roberto Morgado Oyarzún (RN)
- Marcelo Góngora Carvajal (DC)
- Ignacio Navarro Moyano (PCCh)
- Guillermo Barra Arancibia (PP)
- Fernanda Ternicier Andrades (Ind.)

Within the electoral divisions of Chile Villa Alemana is part of the 6th electoral district, represented in the Chamber of Deputies by the deputies:

- Diego Ibáñez (CS)
- Francisca Bello (CS)
- Nelson Venegas (PS)
- Carolina Marzán (PPD)
- Andrés Longton (RN)
- Camila Flores (RN)
- Chiara Barchiesi (REP)
- Gaspar Rivas (PDG)

As part of the 6th senatorial constituency (Valparaíso), the commune is represented in the Senate by the senators:

- Francisco Chahuán Chahuán (RN)
- Kenneth Pugh Olavarría (RN)
- Ricardo Lagos Weber (PPD)
- Isabel Allende Bussi (PS)
- Juan Ignacio Latorre Rivero (RD)

== Education ==
There is a German school, Deutsche Schule Villa Alemana.

== Climate ==
Climate data for Villa Alemana (Penablanca)
Month	Jan	Feb	Mar	Apr	May	Jun	Jul	Aug	Sep	Oct	Nov	Dec	Year
Mean daily maximum °C (°F)	27.2 (81.0)	27.2 (81.0)	26.3 (79.3)	22.4 (72.3)	19.6 (67.3)	17.1 (62.8)	16.0 (60.8)	17.4 (63.3)	19.9 (67.8)	22.2 (72.0)	24.5 (76.1)	26.9 (80.4)	22.2 (72.0)
Daily mean °C (°F)	19.8 (67.6)	19.1 (66.4)	17.8 (64.0)	14.8 (58.6)	12.8 (55.0)	10.6 (51.1)	9.7 (49.5)	10.3 (50.5)	12.9 (55.2)	15.0 (59.0)	17.0 (62.6)	18.8 (65.8)	14.9 (58.8)
Mean daily minimum °C (°F)	13.8 (56.8)	13.8 (56.8)	12.2 (54.0)	9.7 (49.5)	8.2 (46.8)	6.1 (43.0)	5.2 (41.4)	5.3 (41.5)	8.3 (46.9)	10.2 (50.4)	11.8 (53.2)	12.8 (55.0)	9.8 (49.6)
Average precipitation mm (inches)	0.7 (0.03)	4.1 (0.16)	2.0 (0.08)	29.7 (1.17)	66.1 (2.60)	91.2 (3.59)	79.2 (3.12)	83.4 (3.28)	9.2 (0.36)	16.2 (0.64)	0.2 (0.01)	0.1 (0.00)	382.1 (15.04)
Average relative humidity (%)	66	68	70	77	80	82	82	82	80	76	70	66	75
Source: Bioclimatografia de Chile

== Twin cities ==
- Bethlehem, State of Palestine
