= Christian Urízar =

Chilean politician

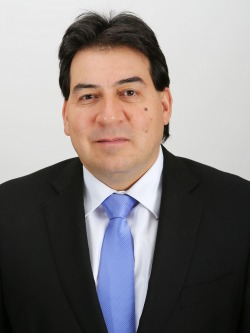

Member of the Chamber of Deputies
- In office 11 March 2014 – 11 March 2018
- Preceded by: Eduardo Cerda
- Succeeded by: District dissolved
- Constituency: 10th District (Cabildo, La Calera, Hijuelas, La Cruz, La Ligua, Nogales, Papudo, Petorca, Puchuncaví, Quillota, Quintero and Zapallar)

Governor of Petorca Province
- In office 11 March 2004 – 11 March 2006
- President: Ricardo Lagos
- Preceded by: Marco Antonio Quiroz
- Succeeded by: Julio Trigo

Personal details
- Born: 27 May 1968 (age 58) Santiago, Chile
- Party: Socialist Party
- Spouse: Marcela Córdoba
- Children: One
- Education: Pontifical Catholic University of Valparaíso (BS)
- Profession: Chemical engineer

Christian Erwin Urízar Muñoz (born 27 May 1968) is a Chilean politician who served as deputy.

== Biography ==
He was born in Santiago on 27 May 1968, the son of Alberto Orlando Urízar Meunier and Sonia del Carmen Muñoz Domínguez.

He is the widower of Marcela del Pilar Córdova Rivera and the father of one daughter. He studied Chemical Civil Engineering at the Pontifical Catholic University of Valparaíso. He later completed a diploma in Productive Development at the University of Santiago, Chile.

He is the owner of Nucom Limitada, a company that implements training programs.

Between 2006 and 2014, he served as general manager of the Corporación Empresarial de Desarrollo Pro Til Til.

== Political career ==
In 1991, he was appointed secretary general of the Student Federation of the Pontifical Catholic University of Valparaíso.

Between 2004 and 2006, he was appointed governor of Petorca by President Ricardo Lagos. A member of the Socialist Party of Chile, he served as regional president of the party in Valparaíso between 2011 and 2014.

Between 2008 and 2012, he was a member of the Regional Council of the Regional Government of Valparaíso (CORE). In 2009, he chaired the Socialist Party caucus within the council and, between 2011 and 2012, presided over the Commission on Investment, Budget and Regional Heritage. In 2011, he was vice president of the Commission on International Integration of Chilean Regional Councilors.

He left his position as Regional Councilor of Valparaíso on 12 November 2012 to run as a pre-candidate for deputy in the 2013 parliamentary elections. In August 2013, he won the primary election of the Nueva Mayoría pact as candidate for deputy for District No. 10.
