= Puchuncaví =

- Town and commune
- Location in Chile
- Coordinates (city): 32°44′S 71°25′W
- Country: Chile
- Region: Valparaíso
- Province: Valparaíso

Government
  - Type: Municipality
  - Mayor: Marcos Morales (Ind./RN)

Area
  - Total: 299.9 km^{2} (115.8 sq mi)
- Elevation: 32 m (105 ft)

Population (2017 Census)
  - Total: 18,546
  - Density: 61.84/km^{2} (160.2/sq mi)
  - Urban: 15,859
  - Rural: 2,687

Sex
  - Men: 9,358
  - Women: 9,188
- Time zone: UTC-4 (CLT)
  - Summer (DST): UTC-3 (CLST)
- Website: Municipality of Puchuncaví

Puchuncaví is a town and commune in the Valparaíso Province of central Chile's fifth region of Valparaíso. It spans a coastal area of 299.9 km^{2} (116 sq mi).

== History ==
The history of Puchuncaví and its surroundings goes back over 500 years, being one of the oldest localities in Chile. The contemporary name comes from the Mapudungun "Punchuncahuin", meaning "where fiestas abound". Similarly, there have been other meanings to this word, such as "Remains of Fiestas" or "End of Fiestas".

There are no precise dates known relating to the origin of Puchuncaví, and it is presumed that at the arrival of the Spaniards a shantytown by this name existed. Puchuncaví was one of the terminals of the famous Inca road system, a stone footpath of medium width that united the Zona Central of Chile with Cuzco, Peru, the capital of the Inca Empire.

In this location resided a Curaca or direct representative of the Inca, in charge of collecting taxes, crops, and imposing imperial authority over the indigenous peoples of the region. Upon the arrival of the Spanish, conquistador Pedro de Valdivia gave the valley of Puchuncaví to one of his soldiers, the Italian native Milán Vicenzo del Monte, a nephew of Pope Julius II.

His descendants subdivided the lands between their heirs and finally in the 17th century there were several principal owners. On 8 December 1691, the Parrish of Puchuncaví was created by the Chaplain of War during the independence of Chile, Presbyter Juan Manuel Benavides y Mujica, as recorded in the parish archives.

On 6 March 1875, the Villa of Puchuncaví was declared and was on several occasions provincial capital. In the year 1894 the first commune called "Quintero-Puchuncaví" was formed, integrating the two neighboring localities.

In 1929, president Carlos Ibáñez del Campo, issued a decree annexing the low-budget communes, and Puchuncaví was eliminated. This mandate complicated the situation; Puchuncaví happened to depend on Quintero. After a long period of dependence on Quintero, the creation of the Puchuncaví commune was achieved through Decree No. 3827 on 15 October 1923 after great efforts made by the then authorities of the town of Quintero and prominent residents of the area.

Thus, in 1943 the corporation of the commune of Quintero decided to separate of the two cities. After a series of meetings with neighbors and the authorities, they achieved this separation on 13 September 1944 as issued in Law Decree No. 7866 under then-president Juan Antonio Ríos and mayor Juan José Mena Salinas, creating the Municipality of Puchuncaví with its eight districts: Placilla de Puchuncaví, La Laguna, La Canela, San Antonio, Pucalán, Melosillas, Los Maitenes, Campiche, La Greda, Las Ventanas, La Chocota and Horcón.

In 1975, with the creation of the Quillota Province and restructuring of the Valparaíso Province, Puchuncaví became part of the latter province.

== Demographics ==
According to data from the 2002 Census of Population and Housing, Puchuncaví had 12,954 inhabitants; of these, 11,099 (85.7%) lived in urban areas and 1,855 (14.3%) in rural areas. At that time, there were 6,643 men and 6,311 women. The population grew by 21.5% (2,293 persons) between the 1992 and 2002 censuses.

The commune consists of a number of localities and towns, including Las Ventanas, which hosts the Foundry and Refinery of Las Ventanas (est. 30 September 1964); La Chocota and Horcón with their handcrafted boats and nude beach; Maitencillo, where one can find the Marbella Resort; El Rungue, countryside known for its traditional restaurant El Caballito de palo (English: "Stick Pony"); Pucalán and Los Maquis, whose people are primarily dedicated to the production of coal and agriculture; Campiche, whose people are primarily dedicated to growing tomatoes and other vegetables; La Canela; La Quebrada; El Paso; La Laguna; Chilicauquen; El Rincón; and El Leon.

== Administration ==
As a commune, Puchuncaví is a third-level administrative division of Chile administered by a municipal council, headed by a mayor who is directly elected every four years. The mayor since 2021 has been Marcos Morales (Ind./RN). The municipal councilors for the 2024–2028 term are the following:

- Juan Pérez (UDI)
- Agustín Valencia (Ind./DC)
- Juan Peña (Ind./PS)
- Benjamín Angulo (FA)
- Andrea Lodi (REP)
- Rosa Berríos (Ind./RN)

Within the electoral divisions of Chile, Puchuncaví is represented in the Chamber of Deputies by Eduardo Cerda (PDC) and Andrea Molina (UDI) as part of the 10th electoral district, together with La Ligua, Petorca, Cabildo, Papudo, Zapallar, Quintero, Nogales, Calera, La Cruz, Quillota and Hijuelas. The commune is represented in the Senate by Ignacio Walker Prieto (PDC) and Lily Pérez San Martín (RN) as part of the 5th senatorial constituency (Valparaíso-Cordillera).
