= Quintero =

- City and Commune
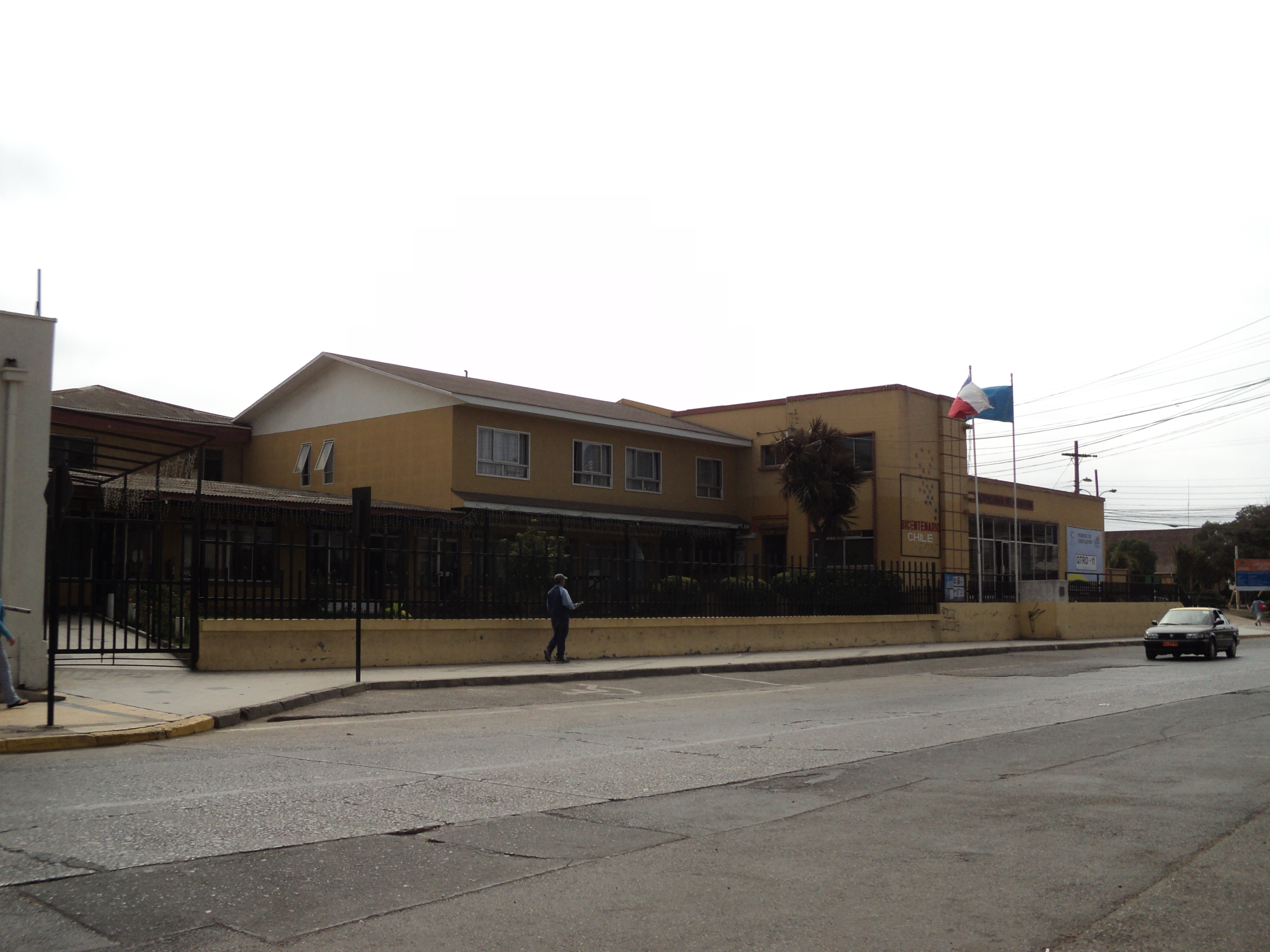
- Quintero town hall

- Location in Chile
- Coordinates: 32°47′S 71°32′Wcity
- Country: Chile
- Region: Valparaíso
- Province: Valparaíso
- Founded: 1536

Government
  - Type: Municipality
  - Alcalde: Rolando Silva Fuentes (Ind)

Area
  - Total: 147.5 km^{2} (57.0 sq mi)
- Elevation: 5 m (16 ft)

Population (2017 Census)
  - Total: 31,923
  - Density: 216.4/km^{2} (560.5/sq mi)
  - Urban: 26,884
  - Rural: 5,039
- Demonym: Quinterano/a

Sex
  - Men: 15,834
  - Women: 16,089
- Time zone: UTC-4 (CLT)
  - Summer (DST): UTC-3 (CLST)
- Area code: 56 + 32
- Website: Official website (in Spanish)

Quintero is a Chilean city and commune in Valparaíso Province, in the Valparaíso Region, 30 kilometers north of Valparaíso. The commune spans an area of 147.5 km^{2} (57 sq mi). It was the first port in the country, created during the expedition of Diego de Almagro. Fundición Ventanas and other heavy industries are located in the commune of Quintero.

== History ==
The name of the city comes from Alonso Quintero, the Spanish navigator who discovered the bay in 1536 when he arrived on the ship Santiaguillo.

In the early years of 21st century, Quintero has become famous as a symbol of insufficient environmental policies. Since the beginnings of 20th century when an industrialization politics started, in the zone were built a thermoelectric coal plant by Chilectra (currently Enel Américas) and the copper smelter Fundición Ventanas by Codelco in the nearby town of the same name; arriving to this date (2019) to be a zone informally known as Industrial Park Quintero-Puchuncaví, including oil industries, liquefied gas terminals, and chemical industries among others, which has caused the bay and surroundings to be considered a "sacrifice zone". Multiple protests about the gradual environmental destruction were unsuccessful, until a serious episode of mass poisoning in August 2018 put a spotlight on the city's situation and its surroundings in Quintero Bay causing investigations by the Senate of Chile. By October 2019, the situation remains unresolved.

== Demographics ==
According to the 2002 census of the National Statistics Institute, Quintero had 21,174 inhabitants (10,390 men and 10,784 women). Of these, 18,719 (88.4%) lived in urban areas and 2,455 (11.6%) in rural areas. The population grew by 19% (3,378 persons) between the 1992 and 2002 censuses. The demonym for a man from Quintero is Quinterano and Quinterana for a woman.

== Administration ==
As a commune, Quintero is a third-level administrative division of Chile administered by a communal council, headed by an alcalde who is directly elected every four years. The 2008-2012 alcalde is José Varas Zuñiga.

Within the electoral divisions of Chile, Quintero is represented in the Chamber of Deputies by Eduardo Cerda (PDC) and Andrea Molina (UDI) as part of the 10th electoral district, together with La Ligua, Petorca, Cabildo, Papudo, Zapallar, Puchuncaví, Nogales, Calera, La Cruz, Quillota and Hijuelas. The commune is represented in the Senate by Ignacio Walker Prieto (PDC) and Lily Pérez San Martín (RN) as part of the 5th senatorial constituency (Valparaíso-Cordillera).

== Climate ==
According to the Köppen Climate Classification system, Quintero has a warm-summer mediterranean climate, abbreviated "Csb" on climate maps.

Climate data for Quintero
Month	Jan	Feb	Mar	Apr	May	Jun	Jul	Aug	Sep	Oct	Nov	Dec	Year
Mean daily maximum °C (°F)	20.3 (68.5)	20.3 (68.5)	19.0 (66.2)	17.4 (63.3)	16.2 (61.2)	14.9 (58.8)	14.4 (57.9)	14.8 (58.6)	15.4 (59.7)	16.5 (61.7)	17.9 (64.2)	19.4 (66.9)	17.2 (63.0)
Daily mean °C (°F)	16.0 (60.8)	15.6 (60.1)	14.3 (57.7)	12.7 (54.9)	11.6 (52.9)	10.3 (50.5)	10.0 (50.0)	10.4 (50.7)	11.0 (51.8)	12.3 (54.1)	13.8 (56.8)	15.1 (59.2)	12.8 (55.0)
Mean daily minimum °C (°F)	11.3 (52.3)	11.2 (52.2)	10.1 (50.2)	8.5 (47.3)	7.7 (45.9)	6.5 (43.7)	6.5 (43.7)	6.7 (44.1)	7.1 (44.8)	8.1 (46.6)	9.4 (48.9)	10.5 (50.9)	8.6 (47.6)
Average precipitation mm (inches)	0.2 (0.01)	0.1 (0.00)	2.3 (0.09)	11.4 (0.45)	48.1 (1.89)	78.7 (3.10)	106.4 (4.19)	53.5 (2.11)	21.8 (0.86)	9.7 (0.38)	7.4 (0.29)	1.4 (0.06)	341 (13.43)
Source: Meteorología Interactiva

== Media ==
=== Radio stations ===
FM

- 106.3 MHz - Radio Interferencia
- 107.3 MHz - Radio Simpática (Community Radio)
- 107.7 MHz - Radio Loncura (Community Radio)
