= La Cruz, Chile =

La Cruz
- City and Commune
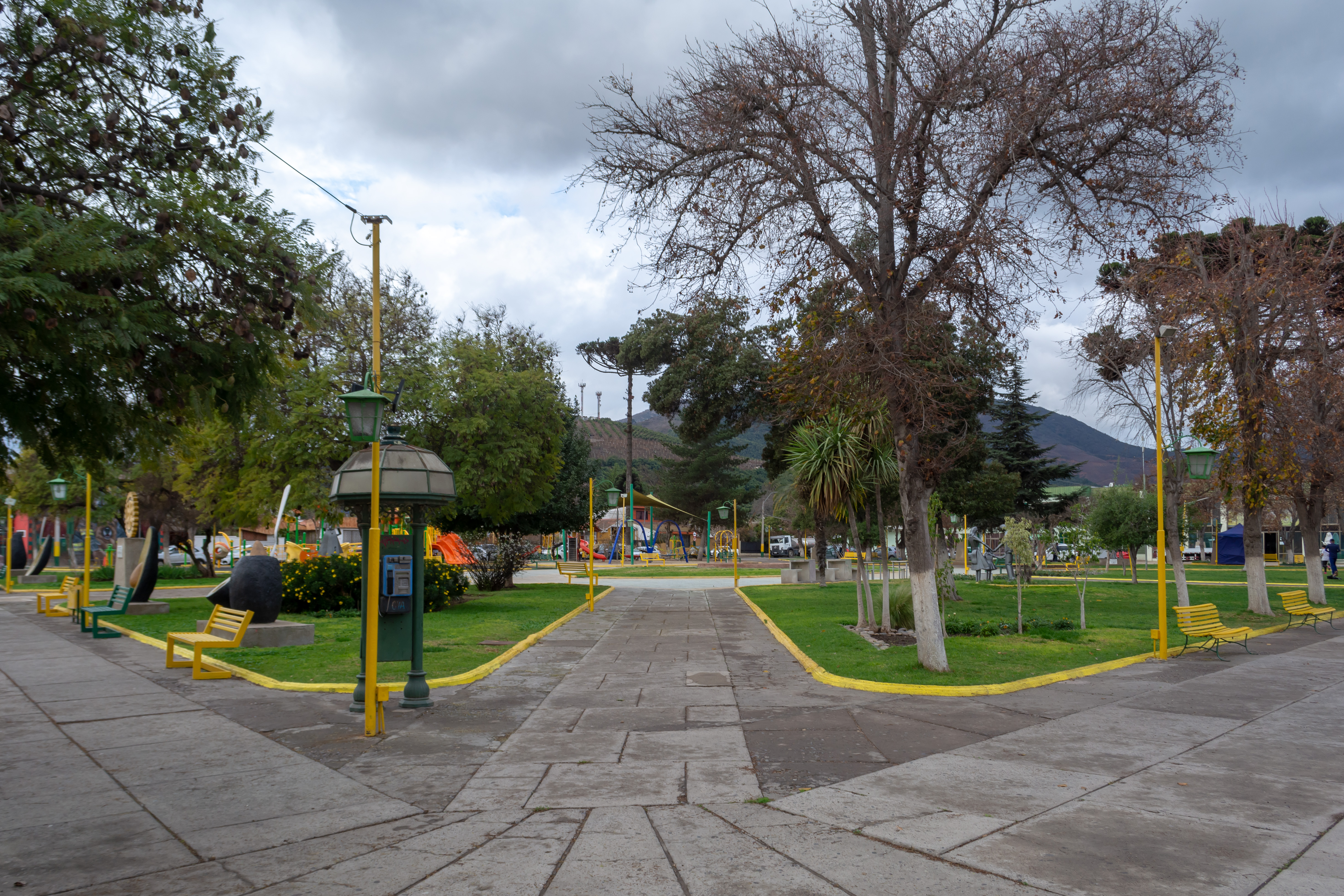
- Plaza de Armas in La Cruz

- Location in Chile
- Coordinates: 32°49′41″S 71°10′34″W
- Country: Chile
- Region: Valparaíso
- Province: Quillota

Government
  - Type: Municipality
  - Alcalde: Filomena Navia (PS)

Area
  - Total: 78.2 km^{2} (30.2 sq mi)
- As of 2002
- Elevation: 543 m (1,781 ft)

Population (2012 Census)
  - Total: 17,310
  - Density: 221/km^{2} (573/sq mi)
  - Urban: 10,611
  - Rural: 2,240

Sex
  - Men: 6,348
  - Women: 6,503
- Time zone: UTC-4 (CLT)
  - Summer (DST): UTC-3 (CLST)
- Area code: country 56 + city 33
- Website: Municipality of La Cruz

La Cruz (Spanish pronunciation: [la kɾus]) is a city and commune in Quillota Province, Valparaíso Region, Chile.

== Geography ==
The Mediterranean climate of Chile's Zona Central allows for a rich quality and variety of flora and fauna. Because of this climate, La Cruz produces many fruits and vegetables, and is known as the "National Capital of the Avocado", The town is also one of the main producers of chirimoya, a fruit with a green shell and white meat.

The commune of La Cruz spans an area of 78.2 km^{2} (30 sq mi).

== Demographics and culture ==
According to the 2002 census of the National Statistics Institute, La Cruz spans has 12,851 inhabitants (6,348 men and 6,503 women). Of these, 10,611 (82.6%) lived in urban areas and 2,240 (17.4%) in rural areas. The population grew by 19.3% (2,080 persons) between the 1992 and 2002 censuses.

The Camilo Henríquez Municipal Library, created in 1954, has over 9,000 books and multimedia.

== Economy ==
The economy is sustained principally through agriculture, highlighted by avocados and chirimoyas, and flower cultivation. Beginning in the year 2001, various changes were made in road infrastructure, urban and territorial improvements and significant advances in the areas of health and education.

== Administration ==
As a commune, La Cruz is a third-level administrative division of Chile, administered by a communal council (consejo comunal), which is headed by a directly elected alcalde. The current alcalde is Filomena Navia Hevia. The communal council has the following members:

- Amaia Arrazota Larrondo
- Edmundo Olivares Perez
- Alejandra Espinoza Díaz
- Filomena Navia Hevia
- Brenda Cataldo Gaete
- Hector Cerda Vergara

Within the electoral divisions of Chile, La Cruz is represented in the Chamber of Deputies by Eduardo Cerda (PDC) and Andrea Molina (UDI) as part of the 10th electoral district, (together with La Ligua, Petorca, Cabildo, Papudo, Zapallar, Puchuncaví, Quintero, Nogales, Calera, Quillota and Hijuelas). The commune is represented in the Senate by Ignacio Walker Prieto (PDC) and Lily Pérez San Martín (RN) as part of the 5th senatorial constituency (Valparaíso-Cordillera).

== Health ==
The local health center has experienced since 2001 a profound transformation in infrastructure, medical equipment and increased staffing of attention, which places it among the best in the region.

It has specialists in the field of Pediatrics and Gynecology, is open Monday through Saturday and his appearance is that of a true private clinic. There psychologists, physiotherapists, nutritionists, podiatrists to provide comprehensive care for crucinos. It offers health care programs at country pioneers such as home delivery of psychiatric liaison, visiting bedridden patients, mammography, dental, ultrasound, providing lenses, sterilization of dogs and cats among others.

== Education ==
In recent years, education in the district has experienced a major change in infrastructure and educational achievements. They have built classrooms, new restrooms, playgrounds, sports Multicanchas roofing, replacement of furniture and interactive whiteboards. They have integrated the municipal gardens that serve children 3 to 5 years. It also has three nurseries located in the Leonardo da Vinci School, Bologna and Mary Alonso Chacón.

From 2007 taught computer classes, physical education and English with teachers specializing in the subject from kindergarten level to fourth means, pioneering program in the municipal education. Students have SIMCE and psu workshops to reinforce their learning. Besides the curriculum prescribed by the ministry students have workshops and psubanda SIMCE instrumental art rock, handball, table tennis, catechesis, dance, chess, folklore, football, volleyball, basketball, since its formation on trial of the former Mrs. Maite Larrondo Laborde community "must be comprehensive." In the commune are the following establishments municipal elementary and secondary education:

- College Bologna (CITY), with nursery, garden, prekindergarten, kindergarten, elementary and adult education.
- Wilson College Domingo Santa Cruz Pocochay sector (municipal), with garden, prekindergarten, kindergarten and elementary.
- School Leonardo da Vinci (CITY), with nursery, garden, prekindergarten, kindergarten, elementary, secondary and adult education.
- The College Rojas (CITY), with garden, prekindergarten, kindergarten and elementary.
- Colegio María Alonso Chacon (CITY), with nursery, garden, prekindergarten, kindergarten, elementary and adult education (primary and secondary)
- Liceo San Isidro (subsidized private) ODEC Foundation., Preschool, kindergarten, elementary, secondary.
- School High School, (Private), Basic.
- Agricultural technical school Bishop Rafael Infante Lira (subsidized private), Media.
