= Nogales, Chile =

Nogales
- City and Commune
- Location in Chile
- Coordinates: 32°44′06″S 71°12′09″W
- Country: Chile
- Region: Valparaíso
- Province: Quillota

Government
  - Type: Municipality
  - Mayor: Margarita Osorio

Area
  - Total: 405.2 km^{2} (156.4 sq mi)
- As of 2002
- Elevation: 215 m (705 ft)

Population (2012 Census)
  - Total: 21,856
  - Density: 53.94/km^{2} (139.7/sq mi)
  - Urban: 18,698
  - Rural: 2,935

Sex
  - Men: 10,786
  - Women: 10,847
- Time zone: UTC-4 (CLT)
  - Summer (DST): UTC-3 (CLST)
- Area code: 56 + 33
- Website: Municipality of Nogales

Nogales (Spanish pronunciation: [noˈɣales]) is a city and commune in the Quillota Province of central Chile's fifth region of Valparaíso.

== Geography ==
The commune of Nogales spans an area of 405.2 km^{2} (156 sq mi).

== Demographics ==
According to the 2002 census of the National Statistics Institute, Nogales has 21,633 inhabitants (10,786 men and 10,847 women). Of these, 18,698 (86.4%) lived in urban areas and 2,935 (13.6%) in rural areas. The population grew by 15.9% (2,964 persons) between the 1992 and 2002 censuses.

== Administration ==
As a commune, Nogales is a third-level administrative division of Chile, administered by a communal council (consejo comunal), which is headed by a directly elected alcalde. The current alcalde is Óscar Cortés Puebla (PDC). The communal council has the following members:

- Juan Rivera (PC)
- Oscar Mena (Independent)
- Jorge Gómez (RN)
- Josué Godoy (PS)
- Jaime Lineros (PRSD)
- Nelson Verdejo (PPD)

Within the electoral divisions of Chile, Nogales is represented in the Chamber of Deputies by Eduardo Cerda (PDC) and Andrea Molina (UDI) as part of the 10th electoral district, (together with La Ligua, Petorca, Cabildo, Papudo, Zapallar, Puchuncaví, Quintero, Calera, La Cruz, Quillota and Hijuelas). The commune is represented in the Senate by Ignacio Walker Prieto (PDC) and Lily Pérez San Martín (RN) as part of the 5th senatorial constituency (Valparaíso-Cordillera).
