= La Calera, Chile =

City and commune in Valparaíso, Chile

La Calera
- City and Commune
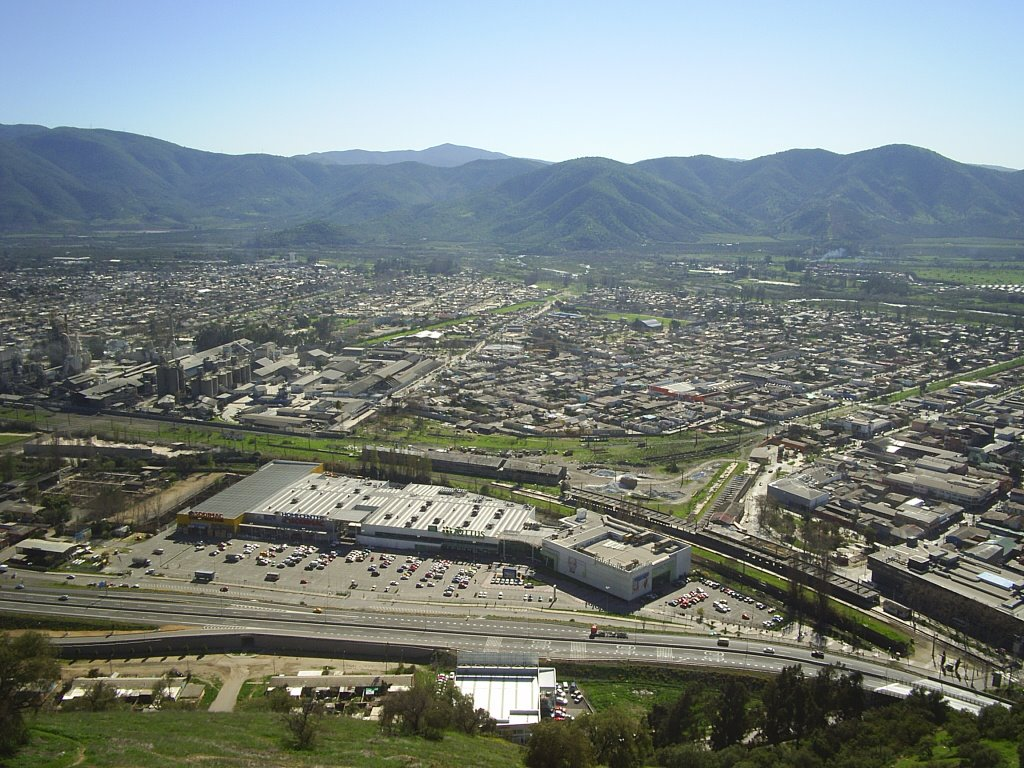
- Downtown La Calera from the hills

- Coat of arms Location in Chile
- Coordinates: 32°47′12″S 71°11′50″W
- Country: Chile
- Region: Valparaíso
- Province: Quillota
- Founded: 1844

Government
  - Type: Municipality
  - Mayor: Johnny Piraino (DC)

Area
  - Total: 60.5 km^{2} (23.4 sq mi)
- As of 2002
- Elevation: 183 m (600 ft)

Population (2012 Census)
  - Total: 50,221
  - Density: 830/km^{2} (2,150/sq mi)
  - Urban: 47,836
  - Rural: 1,667
- Demonym: Calerano

Sex
  - Men: 24,134
  - Women: 25,369
- Time zone: UTC-4 (CLT)
  - Summer (DST): UTC-3 (CLST)
- Area code: 56 + 33
- Website: Official website (in Spanish)

La Calera is a city and commune in the Quillota Province of central Chile's fifth region of Valparaíso.

== Geography ==
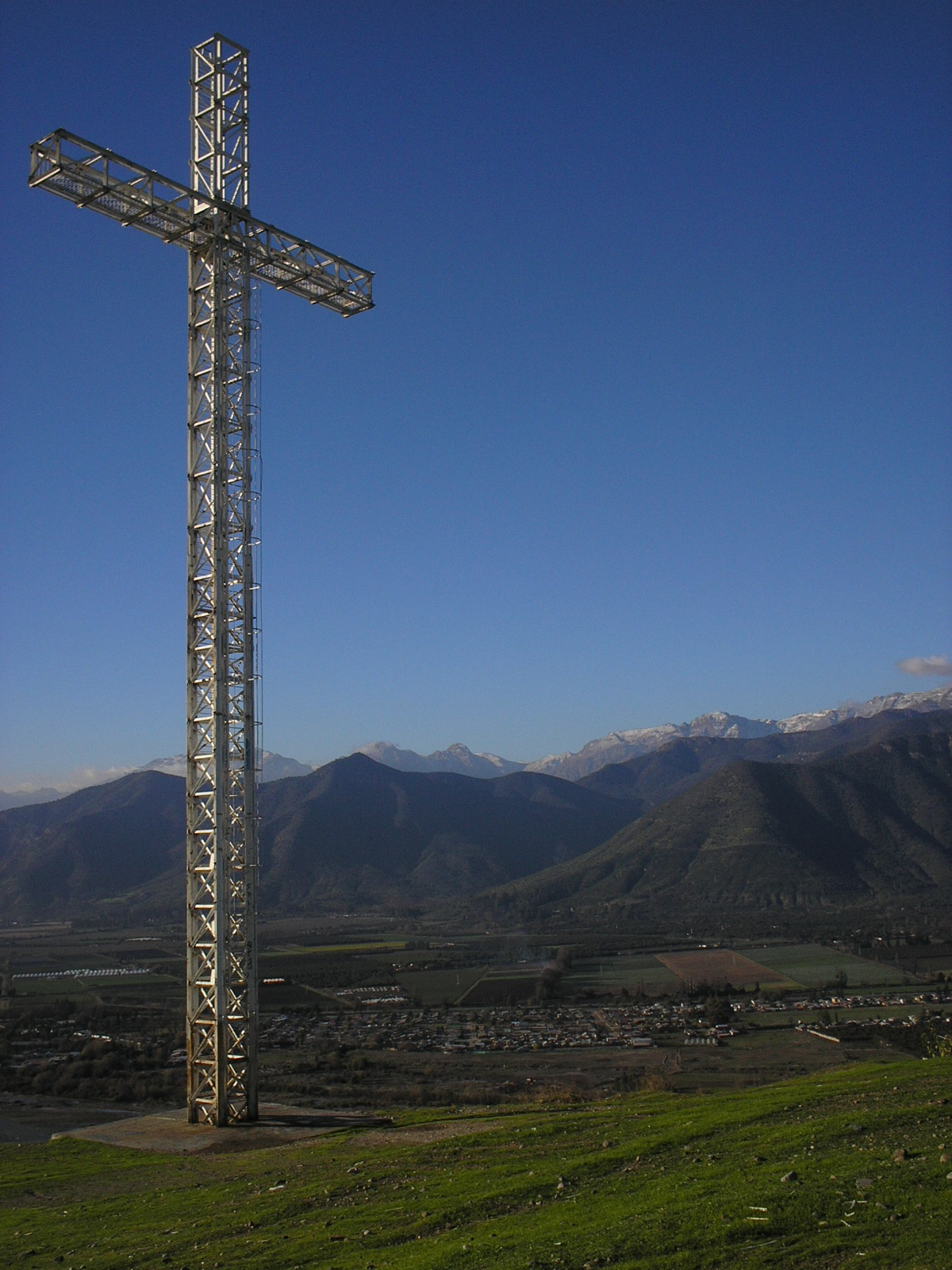
100-Foot-high Cross on "La Melonita" hill, in La Calera

La Calera is located 66 km (41 mi) northeast of Valparaíso, and 118 km (73 mi) northwest of Santiago, in the Aconcagua River Valley. Its area is 60.5 km^{2} (23 sq mi). La Calera borders Nogales to the north and west, Hijuelas to the east, and La Cruz to the south.

The city of La Calera is partly enclosed by Route 5 and Route 60.

== History ==
La Calera's name comes from the production of quicklime (Spanish "cal") that is obtained from the processed limestone (Spanish: piedra caliza) (calcium carbonate), extracted from the hills at the south of the town, which were already exploited by the Chilean and Peruvian natives for some 400 years previously. Therefore, La Calera means "quicklime mine".

Established by the Jesuits as a settlement of the Jesuit reduction, the estate of La Calera belonged to the Jesuits up to 1767, to the expulsion of Jesuits by the decree of King Charles III of Spain from 1 March 1767. The Bavarian Jesuit missionary Karl von Haimhausen was prominent in the area's early development. The turning point came in 1842, when it was acquired by Bolivian citizen Ildefonso Huici (father of socialite Eugenia Errázuriz) who started industrialising it using local resources. By 1844, a small town had emerged consisting mainly in a number of workers' dwellings located around the factories and production centres established in it, giving life to what La Calera is today.

== Economy ==
Due to its strategic crossroads location on the central valley and the pioneering and entrepreneurial work of locals and immigrants (Palestinians, Germans, Italians), La Calera has managed to remain a significant commercial and services centre to the interior of the Valparaiso Region, even though it is not the capital city of the Province. It also remains an important industrial base, employing a fair share of the rural population around it.

=== Industries and commercial markets ===
- Cemento Melón
- Sopraval
- Algamar
- Falabella Shopping Plaza
- Ripley Shopping Plaza

== Demographics ==
According to data from the Census 2002 by the National Statistics Institute, the commune's population was 49,503 inhabitants (24,134 men and 25,369 women). Of these, 47,836 (96.6%) lived in urban areas and 1,667 (3.4%) in rural areas. Its 2007 estimated population was 50,644. La Calera holds 3.21% of the total population of the region. The city's central location in between Santiago de Chile and Valparaíso on the coast made the city of La Calera a true crossroads of industrial development.

Before 1950, La Calera received several immigrant communities, including Palestinians and Italians. The town has been described as having a large proportion of residents of Palestinian descent compared with other towns in Latin America. A former mayor of La Calera was of Palestinian descent. Italian and French immigrants also took part in the area's agricultural economy.

La Calera has a mestizo cultural identity and over half the people have some Amerindian ancestry. It is estimated that Spanish descendants and mestizos make up more than 90% of the population.

=== Notable Caleranos ===
The demonym for a person from La Calera is Calerano for a man, or Calerana for a woman. Notable Caleranos include:

- Eugenia Errázuriz
- Elías Figueroa Branden
- Manfred Max-Neef

== Administration ==
As a commune, La Calera is a third-level administrative division of Chile, administered by a communal council (Concejo Comunal), which is headed by a directly elected mayor. The current mayor, as of December 2008, is Dr. Eduardo Martínez Machuca (Christian Democrat). The communal council has the following members:

- Trinidad Rojo (RN)
- Margarita Osorio (independent)
- Ricardo Aliaga (DC)
- Gustavo Arancibia (PS)
- Orietta Valencia (PRSD)
- Lautaro Correa (PS)

Within the electoral divisions of Chile, La Calera is represented in the Chamber of Deputies by Eduardo Cerda (PDC) and Andrea Molina (UDI) as part of the 10th electoral district, (together with La Ligua, Petorca, Cabildo, Papudo, Zapallar, Puchuncaví, Quintero, Nogales La Cruz, Quillota and Hijuelas). The commune is represented in the Senate by Ignacio Walker Prieto (PDC) and Lily Pérez San Martín (RN) as part of the 5th senatorial constituency (Valparaíso-Cordillera).

== Universities ==
- Universidad Aconcagua
- Universidad Bolivariana
- CTF Pontificia Universidad Católica de Valparaíso

== International relations ==
La Calera is sister cities with:

- Beit Jala, Palestine

== See also ==
- La Calera railway station
