= List of shipwrecks in May 1854 =

The list of shipwrecks in May 1854 includes ships sunk, wrecked, grounded, or otherwise lost during May 1854.

== 1 May ==
List of shipwrecks: 1 May 1854
Ship	State	Description
Adele	France	The brig struck a rock off Lihou, Channel Islands and was abandoned with the loss of two of her six crew. She was on a voyage from Licata, Sicily to Roscoff, Finistère.
Mercedes	Peruvian Navy	The transport ship struck a rock and was wrecked at Casma with the loss of 731 lives. She was on a voyage from Casma to Callao.

== 2 May ==
List of shipwrecks: 2 May 1854
Ship	State	Description
Sidney	United Kingdom	The ship sprang a leak and sank in the Atlantic Ocean. Her crew were rescued. She was on a voyage from Sunderland, County Durham to Quebec City, Province of Canada, British North America.
Wilhelmine	Greifswald	The ship collided with a British brig and sank off Skagen, Denmark. Her crew were rescued. She was on a voyage from Stettin to Hull, Yorkshire, United Kingdom.

== 3 May ==
List of shipwrecks: 3 May 1854
Ship	State	Description
Antoinette Cesar	France	The ship ran aground on the Corsair Rocks, off the coast of Victoria. She was refloated and taken in to Swan Bay.
Winchester	United Kingdom	The ship foundered in the Atlantic Ocean with the loss of 25 lives. About 500 survivors were rescued by Washington (United States). Winchester was on a voyage from Liverpool, Lancashire to New York, United States.

== 4 May ==
List of shipwrecks: 4 May 1854
Ship	State	Description
Mahomed Shah	Flag unknown	The barque was destroyed by fire in the Pacific Ocean. All 59 people on board were rescued by the brig Ellen (United Kingdom).
Victoria	United Kingdom	The ship capsized in a squall with the loss of three of her crew. She was on a voyage from Calcutta, India to Singapore, Straits Settlements.

== 5 May ==
List of shipwrecks: 5 May 1854
Ship	State	Description
Richard Cowle	Elbing	The barque ran aground at Rotterdam, South Holland, Netherlands. She was refloated.

== 6 May ==
List of shipwrecks: 6 May 1854
Ship	State	Description
Ann	Chile	The brig sank at Valparaíso.
Argo	Sweden	The ship ran aground and was wrecked off Sandhammaren. She was on a voyage from Copenhagen, Denmark to Ystad.
Bella Maria Teresa	Chile	The brigantine was driven ashore at Valparaíso.
Catherine	Chile	The full-rigged ship was driven ashore and wrecked at Valparaíso.
Colchagua	Chile	The schooner was driven ashore and wrecked at Valparaíso.
Corsair	United States	The brig was wrecked at Papudo, Chile.
Esperanza	Chile	The barque sank at Valparaíso.
Express	Chile	The brig was driven ashore and wrecked at Valparaíso.
Fortuna	Chile	The full-rigged ship was driven ashore and wrecked at Valparaíso.
Guamas	Chile	The hulk sank at Valparaíso.
Hurrican	Chile	The schooner was driven ashore and wrecked at Valparaíso.
Isabella	United Kingdom	The brigantine was wrecked at Valparaíso.
Jhelum	United Kingdom	The full-rigged ship was severely damaged at Valparaíso.
Johanne	Stralsund	The sloop was driven ashore on the west coast of Saltholm, Denmark and was abandoned. She was on a voyage from Stralsund to Copenhagen, Denmark.
Longomilla	Chile	The brigantine was driven ashore at Valparaíso.
Maria Josefa	Chile	The schooner was driven ashore at Valparaíso.
New Orleans	United Kingdom	The full-rigged ship was severely damaged at Valparaíso.
Primero	Chile	The barque was wrecked at Zapallar.
Rhonda	United Kingdom	The barque was severely damaged at Valparaíso.
Romulus	United Kingdom	The brig was severely damaged at Valparaíso.
Sir Charles Napier	United Kingdom	The full-rigged ship was severely damaged at Valparaíso.
Sultana	United Kingdom	The barque was severely damaged at Valparaíso.

== 7 May ==
List of shipwrecks: 7 May 1854
Ship	State	Description
Arendal	Norway	The brig was abandoned in the Atlantic Ocean. Her crew were rescued by Haidee (United Kingdom). Arendal was on a voyage from Leith, Lothian, United Kingdom to Quebec City, Province of Canada, British North America.

== 8 May ==
List of shipwrecks: 8 May 1854
Ship	State	Description
Claudius	Hamburg	The ship was wrecked on the Kness Shallows, in the North Sea off the coast of the Duchy of Holstein. Her crew survived. She was on a voyage from Sunderland, County Durham, United Kingdom to Hamburg.
Jenny	Sweden	The schooner was in collision with a Royal Navy frigate and sank at Stockholm. Her crew were rescued.

== 10 May ==
List of shipwrecks: 10 May 1854
Ship	State	Description
Elizabeth	Hamburg	The ship was wrecked on Læsø, Denmark. Her crew were rescued. She was on a voyage from Hamburg to Memel, Prussia.
Sterling	United States	The brig was wrecked on the Coach Reef. She was on a voyage from Matanzas, Cuba to Montreal, Province of Canada, British North America.

== 11 May ==
List of shipwrecks: 11 May 1854
Ship	State	Description
Allport	United Kingdom	The brig struck the Feenesh Rock, off the Isle of Arran and was damaged. She was on a voyage from Odesa to Galway.
Clyde	United Kingdom	The steamship ran aground at Rosneath, Argyllshire. She was on a voyage from Greenock, Renfrewshire to Gare Loch. She was refloated and put back to Greenock.
Ruby	United Kingdom	The ship ran aground on the Holme Sand, in the North Sea off the coast of Suffolk. She was on a voyage from Sunderland, County Durham to London. She was refloated the next day.

== 12 May ==
List of shipwrecks: 12 May 1854
Ship	State	Description
Argaum	United Kingdom	The ship was driven ashore and severely damaged at Egremont, Lancashire. She was on a voyage from Bombay, India to Liverpool, Lancashire. She was refloated and taken in to Liverpool.
J. R. S.	Chile	The brig was wrecked north of Papudo.
HMS Tiger	Royal Navy	HMS Tiger aground (right), with HMS Vesuvius (left) and HMS Niger (center) offshore. Crimean War: The steam frigate ran aground in fog on the coast of Russia 5 miles (8 km) southwest of Odesa, came under fire by Imperial Russian Army artillery, and was captured by Russian troops after her crew′s attempt to burn her failed. When the screw sloop HMS Niger and paddle sloop-of-war HMS Vesuvius (both Royal Navy) arrived on the scene, Russian artillery reopened fire on her to prevent her recapture by the British and scored hits which caused her to blow up.

== 13 May ==
List of shipwrecks: 13 May 1854
Ship	State	Description
Lady	United Kingdom	The barque struck a rock near the "Due Fratelli e Capo Serra". She floated off but consequently foundered off the coast of the Beylik of Tunis. Her crew survived. She was on a voyage from Newcastle upon Tyne, Northumberland to Athens, Greece.
William Brown	United Kingdom	The ship was wrecked at Calcutta, India.

== 14 May ==
List of shipwrecks: 14 May 1854
Ship	State	Description
Admiral de Winter	Sweden	The koff ran aground in the Agger Canal. Her crew were rescued. She was on a voyage from Newcastle upon Tyne, Northumberland, United Kingdom to Gothenburg. She had become a wreck by 19 May.
Maria Anne	Hamburg	The ship ran aground off Læsø, Denmark. She was on a voyage from Altona to Hull, Yorkshire, United Kingdom. She was refloated and put in to Helsingør, Denmark in a leaky condition.
Petrel	United Kingdom	The ship was driven ashore in Farosund. She was later refloated.

== 15 May ==
List of shipwrecks: 15 May 1854
Ship	State	Description
HMS Jasper	Royal Navy	The paddle steamer caught fire, exploded and sank in the English Channel off Beachy Head, Sussex. Her 32 crew took to the boats and were rescued by Vanguard (United Kingdom)

== 16 May ==
List of shipwrecks: 16 May 1854
Ship	State	Description
Countess of Liverpool	United Kingdom	The schooner sprang a leak and was beached at Kylerhea, Isle of Skye. She was on a voyage from Arklow, County Wicklow to Newcastle upon Tyne, Northumberland.
Garden City	United States	The steamboat was wrecked on a reef in Lake Huron 15 nautical miles (28 km) off the DeTour Reef Lighthouse. All on board were rescued by Queen City (United States). She was on a voyage from Chicago, Illinois to Sault Ste. Marie, Michigan.
Harriet Scott	United Kingdom	The full-rigged ship was sunk by ice 40 nautical miles (74 km)} off Cape Breton Island, Nova Scotia, British North America. Her crew were rescued. She was on a voyage from Padstow, Cornwall to Quebec City, Province of Canada, British North America.
Maria	Sweden	The ship ran aground off Fröel. She was on a voyage from Newcastle upon Tyne to Stockholm. She was refloated and taken in to Klinte for repairs.
Sarah	United Kingdom	The ship was wrecked at Manila, Spanish East Indies.

== 17 May ==
List of shipwrecks: 17 May 1854
Ship	State	Description
Abeona	United Kingdom	The ship struck a sunken rock in the English Channel off Portland, Dorset and was holed. She was on a voyage from Ostend, West Flanders, Belgium to Cardiff, Glamorgan. She consequently put in to Starcross, Devon.
Coriolan	Bremen	The ship was driven ashore at Manasquan, New Jersey, United States. She was on a voyage from Bremen to New York, United States.
Hope	United States	The ship was destroyed by fire at Mobile, Alabama.
Montezuma	United Kingdom	The ship was driven ashore and wrecked at Rockaway, New Jersey. All on board, more than 400 people, were rescued. She was on a voyage from Liverpool, Lancashire to New York City.
Sarah Brown	United Kingdom	The brig was run down and sunk in the Atlantic Ocean by the barque William Tapscott (United Kingdom). Her twelve crew were rescued by William Tapscott.

== 18 May ==
List of shipwrecks: 18 May 1854
Ship	State	Description
Arctic	United Kingdom	The steamship struck the Black Rock, off the Saltee Islands, County Wexford, United Kingdom. She was on a voyage from Liverpool, Lancashire, United Kingdom to New York. She consequently put back to Liverpool the next day.
Caroline	United States	The barque was driven ashore at Manasquan, New Jersey.
Helen Thompson	United Kingdom	The full-rigged ship was holed by ice and foundered off the "Bird Isles". in the Gulf of Saint Lawrence. All on board were rescued by the barque Sarah (United Kingdom) She was on a voyage from Troon, Ayrshire to Quebec City, Province of Canada, British North America.
Isabel	Denmark	The ship ran aground on the Lysegrund and sank. Her crew were rescued.
Unionen	Denmark	The galiot was driven ashore north of the entrance to the Agger Canal. Her crew were rescued. She was on a voyage from Struer to Hartlepool, County Durham, United Kingdom. She had been refloated by 26 May and was to be taken into a Danish port for repairs.
W. H. Harbeck	United States	The ship was destroyed by fire at New York.
William Layton	United States	The full-rigged ship was driven ashore at Manasquan.

== 19 May ==
List of shipwrecks: 19 May 1854
Ship	State	Description
Achilles	United Kingdom	The barque was lost off Harbour Island. Her crew survived. She was on a voyage from New York, United States to Saint John's, Newfoundland, British North America.
Prince of Wales	United Kingdom	The steamship ran aground on the Blacktail Spit, in the Thames Estuary. She was on a voyage from Gothenburg, Sweden to London.
Wilson	United Kingdom	The ship was sunk by ice off St. Paul's, Nova Scotia, British North America. Her crew were rescued by Empress (United Kingdom).

== 20 May ==
List of shipwrecks: 20 May 1854
Ship	State	Description
Concordia	United Kingdom	The ship ran aground on the Midim Sand. She was on a voyage from Hamburg to Perth. She was refloated on 22 May and taken in to Cuxhaven.

== 21 May ==
List of shipwrecks: 21 May 1854
Ship	State	Description
Honfleur	France	The steamship was wrecked near Cabrita Point, Spain. All on board were rescued.
RMS Orinoco	United Kingdom	The troopship ran aground in Southampton Water. She was on a voyage from Southampton, Hampshire to the Crimea. She was refloated and resumed her voyage.

== 22 May ==
List of shipwrecks: 22 May 1854
Ship	State	Description
Baltic	United Kingdom	The steamship ran aground in the Swinebottoms, in the Baltic Sea off the coast of Denmark. She was on a voyage from the Clyde to Pillau, Prussia. She was refloated the next day and towed in the Helsingør, Denmark by the steamships Hertha and Uffo (Denmark).
Betsey	United Kingdom	The ship was in collision with Laurel (United Kingdom) and sank in the River Lagan. Her crew were rescued by Laure;. Betsey was on a voyage from Donaghadee, County Down to Belfast, County Antrim.

== 23 May ==
List of shipwrecks: 23 May 1854
Ship	State	Description
Aldebaran	United Kingdom	The ship was abandoned in the Atlantic Ocean with the loss of seven lives. Survivors were rescued by St. Brelade ( (United Kingdom of Great Britain and Ireland) Jersey). Aldebaran was on a voyage from Poole, Dorset to Quebec City, Province of Canada, British North America.
Rapid	United Kingdom	The ship was wrecked on the coast of Cochinchina in a typhoon. She was on a voyage from Singapore, Straits Settlements to Hong Kong.
Scotia	United Kingdom	The schooner was driven ashore on Swan Island, Victoria. She was refloated the next day but consequently foundered. All on board were rescued.

== 25 May ==
List of shipwrecks: 25 May 1854
Ship	State	Description
Brahmin	United Kingdom	The ship was wrecked on King's Island, New South Wales with the loss of nine of the 34 people on board. She was on a voyage from London to Sydney, New South Wales.
Niagara	United States	The ship was wrecked on Madame Island, in the Saint Lawrence River.
Thomas Wright	United Kingdom	The ship was wrecked on a shoal 12 nautical miles (22 km) off Ossabaw Island, Georgia, United States. She was on a voyage from Matanzas, Cuba to London.

== 26 May ==
List of shipwrecks: 26 May 1854
Ship	State	Description
Bella	United Kingdom	The full-rigged ship foundered in the Atlantic Ocean (21°35′N 38°20′W). Her crew were rescued by Kent (United States). Bella was on a voyage from Rio de Janeiro, Brazil to New York, United States.
Douro	Portugal	The steamship ran aground in the Paracel Islands. Salvage efforts were abandoned on 10 June.
Elizabeth	United Kingdom	The ship was wrecked on the Hare Island Reef. Her crew were rescued. She was on a voyage from London to Green Island, British North America.
Gulnare	United Kingdom	The full-rigged ship was wrecked 60 nautical miles (110 km) west of the Cape of Good Hope, Cape Colony with the loss of two of her crew. The ship, which was carrying gold, was plundered by the local inhabitants.
John and Jean	United Kingdom	The schooner was driven ashore and wrecked south of Seaham, County Durham. She was on a voyage from Perth to Seaham.

== 27 May ==
List of shipwrecks: 27 May 1854
Ship	State	Description
Blossom	United Kingdom	The brig foundered in the North Sea off Hartlepool, County Durham. Her crew were rescued by a coble. She was on a voyage from Seaham, County Durham to King's Lynn, Norfolk.
Charlotte Mays	United Kingdom	The ship was driven ashore at Brielle, South Holland, Netherlands.
Dundee	United Kingdom	The ship was driven ashore and wrecked at Belfast, County Antrim.

== 28 May ==
List of shipwrecks: 28 May 1854
Ship	State	Description
Betsey	United Kingdom	The lugger was in collision with Laurel (United Kingdom) and sank in the River Lagan. Her crew were rescued by Laurel. Betsey was on a voyage from Donaghadee, County Down to Belfast, County Antrim.
Eagle	United Kingdom	The ship struck an iceberg and was abandoned in the Atlantic Ocean. Her crew took to the boats; they were rescued three days later by the brig Esperance (France). Eagle was on a voyage from Tobago to Bristol. Gloucestershire.

== 29 May ==
List of shipwrecks: 29 May 1854
Ship	State	Description
Mary Wilkinson	(United Kingdom of Great Britain and Ireland) Isle of Man	The smack sank in the Irish Sea 15 nautical miles (28 km) south east of Maughold Head. Her crew were rescued. She was on a voyage from Belfast, County Antrim to Liverpool, Lancashire.

== 30 May ==
List of shipwrecks: 30 May 1854
Ship	State	Description
Alnwick Castle	United Kingdom	The ship ran aground on the Scroby Sands, Norfolk. She was refloated and resumed her voyage.
Crescent	United Kingdom	The brig ran aground on the Pennington Spit, in the Solent. She was on a voyage from Hartlepool, County Durham to Poole, Dorset. She was refloated the next day and resumed her voyage.
Fanny	United Kingdom	The ship was destroyed by fire 12 nautical miles (22 km) off Madeira. Her crew survived. She was on a voyage from Livorno, Grand Duchy of Tuscany to New York, United States.
Germanicus	United Kingdom	The ship ran aground in the Dry Tortugas. She was on a voyage from Liverpool, Lancashire to New Orleans, Louisiana, United States. She was refloated and resumed her voyage.
Kaleva	Sweden	Crimean War: The brig was burnt during an attack on Raahe, Grand Duchy of Finland by HMS Leopard, HMS Odin, HMS Valorous and HMS Vulture (all Royal Navy). Also destroyed were four ships under construction, a barque, three schooners and five sloops.
Lyra	United Kingdom	The ship was damaged by fire at Liverpool.

== 31 May ==
List of shipwrecks: 31 May 1854
Ship	State	Description
Briton	United Kingdom	The ship struck an iceberg in the Atlantic Ocean. She was consequently abandoned the next day. Her crew were rescued by Raleigh (United States). Briton was on a voyage from Charleston, South Carolina, United States to Liverpool, Lancashire.
Dumfries	United Kingdom	The ship was lost in the "Perendore Islands". She was on a voyage from Shanghai, China to London.
Europa	United Kingdom	The transport ship was destroyed by fire with the loss on 21 lives.

== Unknown date ==
List of shipwrecks: Unknown date in May 1854
Ship	State	Description
Banner	United Kingdom	The ship was abandoned in the Atlantic Ocean. Her crew were rescued by Sir Alexander (United Kingdom). Banner was on a voyage from Liverpool, Lancashire to Arichat, Nova Scotia, British North America.
David Banks	United Kingdom	The ship was lost off Argyrades, United States of the Ionian Islands. She was on a voyage from Liverpool to Corfu, United States of the Ionian Islands.
Fidele	(United Kingdom of Great Britain and Ireland) New Zealand	The schooner was sighted bottom up on a beach near Cape Campbell in early May. The bodies of two crew were found in the wreck. The vessel was en route from Kaikōura to Wellington with a cargo of oil.
James Moran	United Kingdom	The ship was abandoned in the Atlantic Ocean before 20 May.
Lady Nugent	United Kingdom	The ship foundered in the Bay of Bengal while transporting troops from Madras, India, to Rangoon. Some 400 lives were lost.
London	United Kingdom	The brig was wrecked on "Carriboo Island", British North America. Her crew were rescued by William and Joseph (United Kingdom).
Marquis of Bute	United Kingdom	The ship was sunk by ice in the Atlantic Ocean. Her crew were rescued. She was on a voyage from Padstow, Cornwall to Quebec City, Province of Canada, British North America.
Mayard	United Kingdom	The barque was driven ashore in the Saint Lawrence River. She was on a voyage from Liverpool to Quebec City.
Recherche	French Navy	The corvette was driven ashore on the coast of Iceland before 26 May.
HMS Resolute	Royal Navy	The icebound barque was abandoned in Viscount Melville Sound. The ship was discovered in September 1855 off Baffin Island, Province of Canada, by the whaler George Henry (United States). Restored at the expense of the United States, she was returned to the Royal Navy in December 1856.
Sarah	United Kingdom	The ship was lost in the Talloff River. She was on a voyage from Matakong to Liverpool.
Vixen	(United Kingdom of Great Britain and Ireland) New South Wales	The ship was driven ashore in Trial Bay and was abandoned by her crew.
Xarifa	United Kingdom	The ship capsized off the coast of Sierra Leone in early May. Her crew were rescued by Sarah (United Kingdom) Xarifa was on a voyage from Liverpool to an African port.
