= Samuel León Silva =

Chilean politician

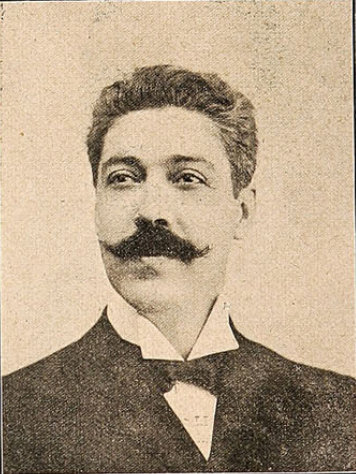
Samuel Leon Silva

Samuel León Silva (Petorca, 1863) was a Chilean politician, deputy, and mayor of Valparaíso.

== Biography ==
Samuel León Silva was born in the city of Petorca in 1863, son of Samuel León Leal (who had been the first mayor of that city between 1858 and 1873) and Demetria Silva García. He was the grandson of Pedro Nolasco León and second cousin of Ramón León Luco.

He was a member of the Liberal Democratic Party or "balmacedista".

He was mayor of Valparaíso between 1896 and 1897, and again in 1897. In 1906 he was elected deputy for the departments of Valparaíso and Casablanca. Member of the Conservative Commission during the legislative recess of 1908–1909. He held his seat until July 12, 1909, when the powers of his successor Alberto Edwards Vives were approved.
