= Petorca =

- Town and Commune
- Location in Chile
- Coordinates: 32°15′05″S 70°55′53″W
- Country: Chile
- Region: Valparaíso
- Province: Petorca

Government
  - Type: Municipality
  - Alcalde: Gustavo Henríquez

Area
  - Total: 1,516.6 km^{2} (585.6 sq mi)
- Elevation: 495 m (1,624 ft)

Population (2012 Census)
  - Total: 9,881
  - Density: 6.515/km^{2} (16.87/sq mi)
  - Urban: 4,535
  - Rural: 4,905

Sex
  - Men: 4,806
  - Women: 4,634
- Time zone: UTC-4 (CLT)
  - Summer (DST): UTC-3 (CLST)
- Area code: 56 + 33
- Climate: BSk
- Website: Municipality of Petorca

Petorca is a Chilean town and commune located in the Petorca Province, Valparaíso Region. The commune spans an area of 1,516.6 km^{2} (586 sq mi). Since 2010 Petorca has been affected by a long-term drought aggravated by poor water administration that have allowed limited water resources go to avocado plantations rather than human settlements.

== Demographics ==
According to the 2002 census of the National Statistics Institute, Petorca has 9,440 inhabitants (4,806 men and 4,634 women). Of these, 4,535 (48%) lived in urban areas and 4,905 (52%) in rural areas. The population grew by 1.8% (167 persons) between the 1992 and 2002 censuses.

== Administration ==
As a commune, Petorca is a third-level administrative division of Chile administered by a municipal council, headed by an alcalde who is directly elected every four years. The 2012-2016 alcalde is Gustavo Valdenegro Rubillo. The council has the following members:

- Ena Jorquera Jorquera
- Ignacio Villalobos Henríquez
- Orlando Montes Astudillo
- Claudio Gonzalo Arenas
- Juan Prado Díaz
- Rodrigo Cuevas Vivanco

Within the electoral divisions of Chile, Petorca is represented in the Chamber of Deputies by Eduardo Cerda (PDC) and Andrea Molina (UDI) as part of the 10th electoral district, (together with La Ligua Cabildo, Papudo, Zapallar, Puchuncaví, Quintero, Nogales, Calera, La Cruz, Quillota and Hijuelas). The commune is represented in the Senate by Ignacio Walker Prieto (PDC) and Lily Pérez San Martín (RN) as part of the 5th senatorial constituency (Valparaíso-Cordillera).
