= Arturo Salazar Valencia =

Arturo Edmundo Salazar Valencia
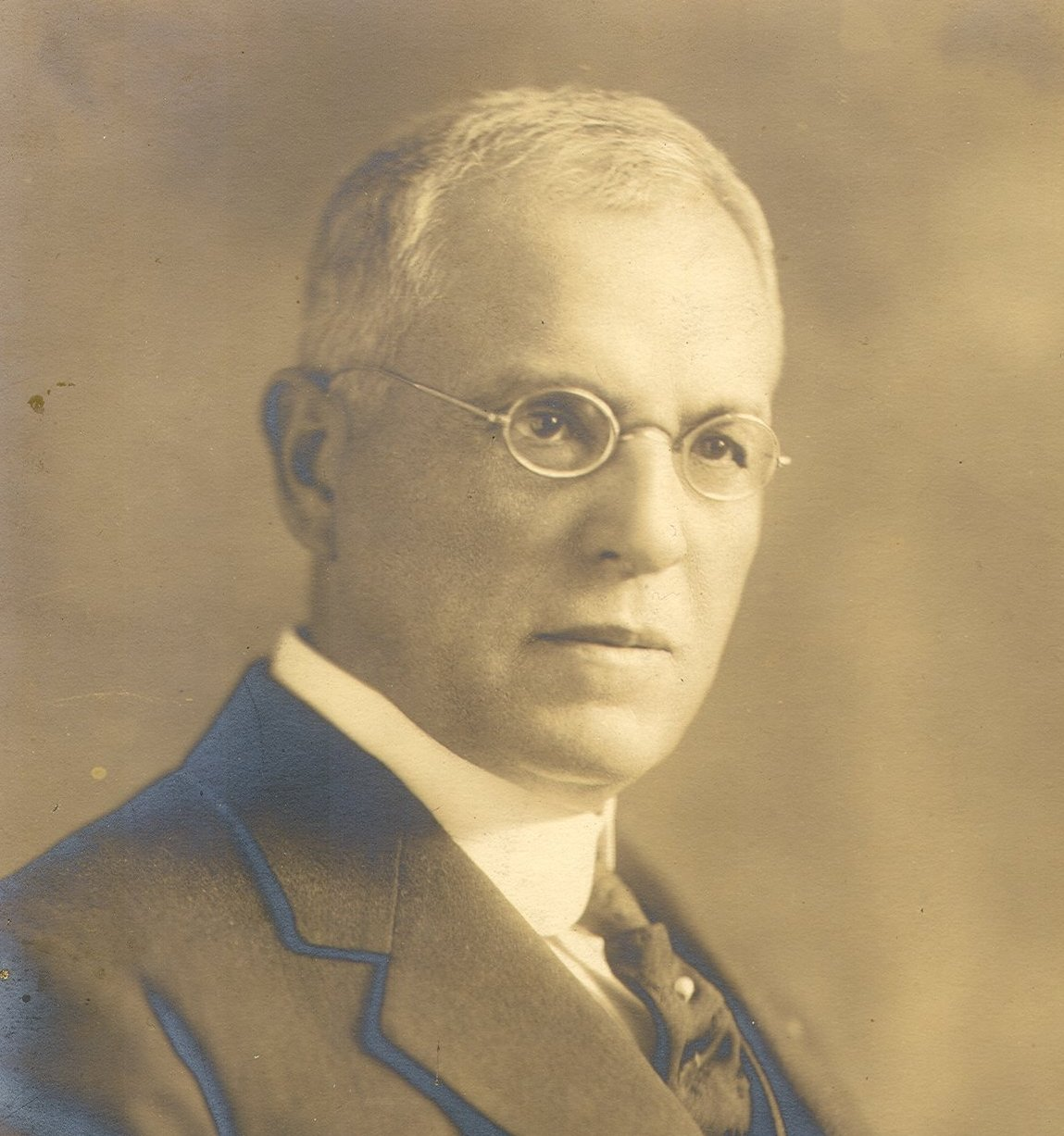
- Arturo E. Salazar Valencia (c. 1900)
- Born: December 3, 1855; Andacollo, Chile
- Died: April 3, 1943 (aged 87); Santiago, Chile
- Education: Autodidact
- Known for: Radiography, Gramophone, Telephone, Radiocommunications, Proponent of the development of electrification in Chile
- Spouse: Hortensia Justiniano Maturana
- Children: Juana Hortensia Salazar Justiniano (1902-1994); Carlos Eugenio Salazar Justiniano (1909-2000); Renato Edmundo Salazar Justiniano (1913-2007)
- Scientific career
- Fields: Electrical engineering
- Institutions: Universidad de Chile, School of Engineering

Arturo Edmundo Salazar Valencia (Andacollo, Chile, 2 December 1855 – Santiago, Chile, 3 April 1943) was a scientist, researcher, innovator and professor of electrical engineering in Chile, who in his role as a self-taught individual, explored a wide variety of fields of interest and is considered a true pioneer in the technological development of his country.

== Biography ==
The son of Ramón Salazar Inostroza and Juana Valencia Ureta, he was born in the mining community of Andacollo, where his father was a military engineer. This individual was a man well ahead of his time, capable of conceiving and presenting in 1861 a project for the construction of a sizable dike or breakwater for the port of Valparaíso, which entailed the dredging of the estuary of Viña del Mar.

Arturo Salazar lost his father at the age of fifteen, but his vocation was already formed, as he served as an assistant in physics in the school run by the French priests in Valparaíso, collaborating with the renowned Frenchman, Fidel Dilley, who helped him take his firststeps.

During his stay in Valparaíso, between 1883 and 1884, he was a physics professor at the Naval Academy, fulfilling this way his pedagogical vocation, while he served at and made his living as the general manager of the Valparaíso Gas Company.

During this period he meets and begins his collaboration with Carlos Newman Andonaegui, a chemistry professor and colleague at the Naval Academy, on a series of publications dealing with topics of national scientific research on matters of daily quality of life, particularly in relation to public health, which would earn him greater prestige both nationally as well as certain recognition abroad.

But Salazar cultivated other interests beyond those of his specialty, shared with scientists and humanists around the world, exchanging correspondence with philosopher Herbert Spencer, the writer Miguel de Unamuno, and the well known philologist Marcelino Menéndez y Pelayo, and studying topics as diverse as the death penalty, the relationship between science and religion, and the topic of rational orthography, which he personally used in numerous publications as well as his personal correspondence.

In 1896, at age forty, already renowned as a scientist, teacher and individual of great intellectual curiosity, Salazar relocates to Santiago. He had a study tour of Europe in 1889 under his belt, and was seeking new horizons.

Salazar was the initiator of the modern study of Electrical Engineering (known as Electrotechnology during his time) at the Engineering School of the University of Chile, in which he served as chair of Industrial Physics and Electrotechnology for 27 years (1898–1925). During this extended career he stressed the importance of experimental work and laboratories, as well as scientific research being at the core of a modern university.

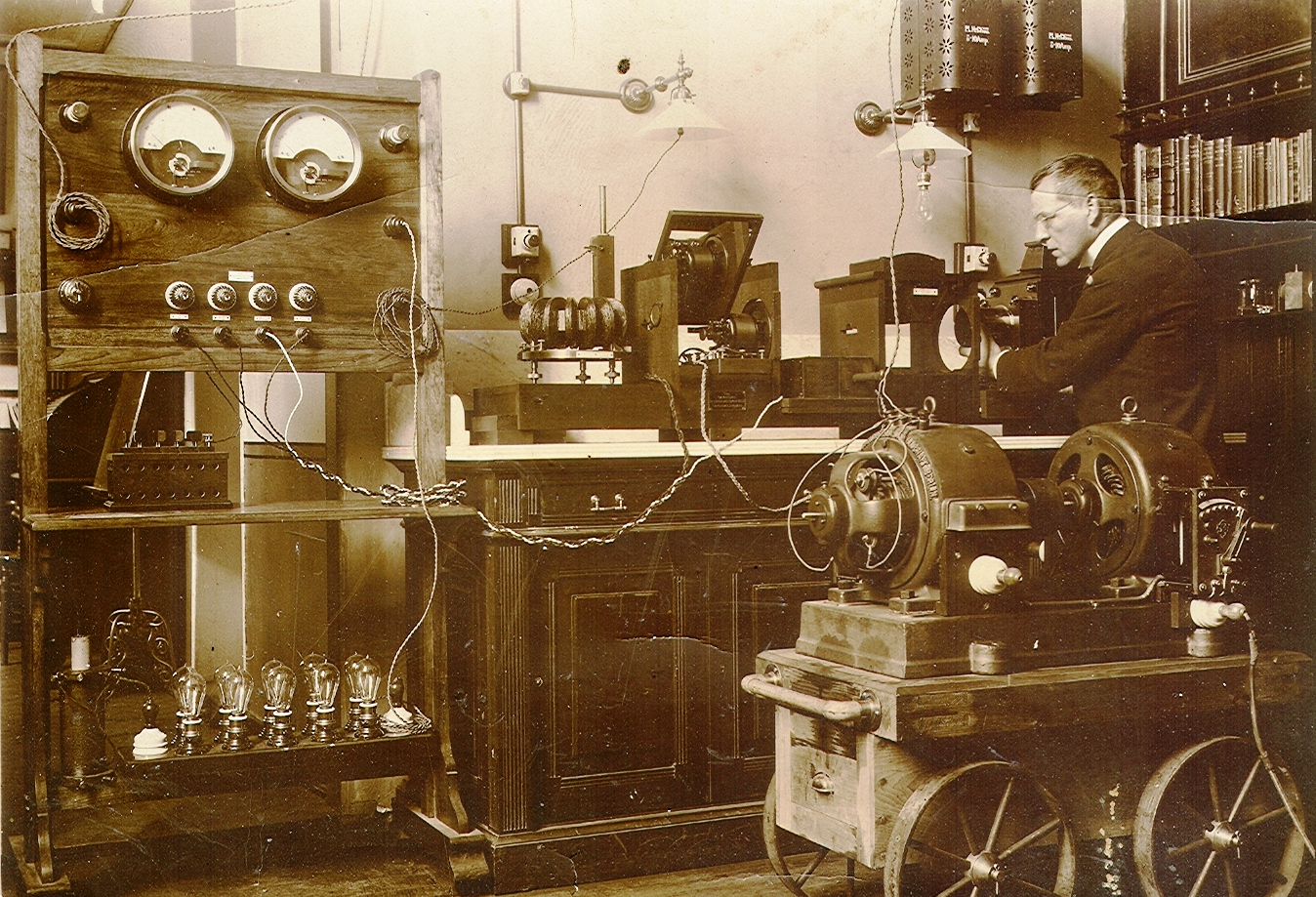
Salazar working in the laboratory of Industrial Physics and Electrotechnology

A portrait of his is kept in the professor's lounge at the School of Engineering of the Physical Sciences and Mathematics Faculty of the University of Chile.

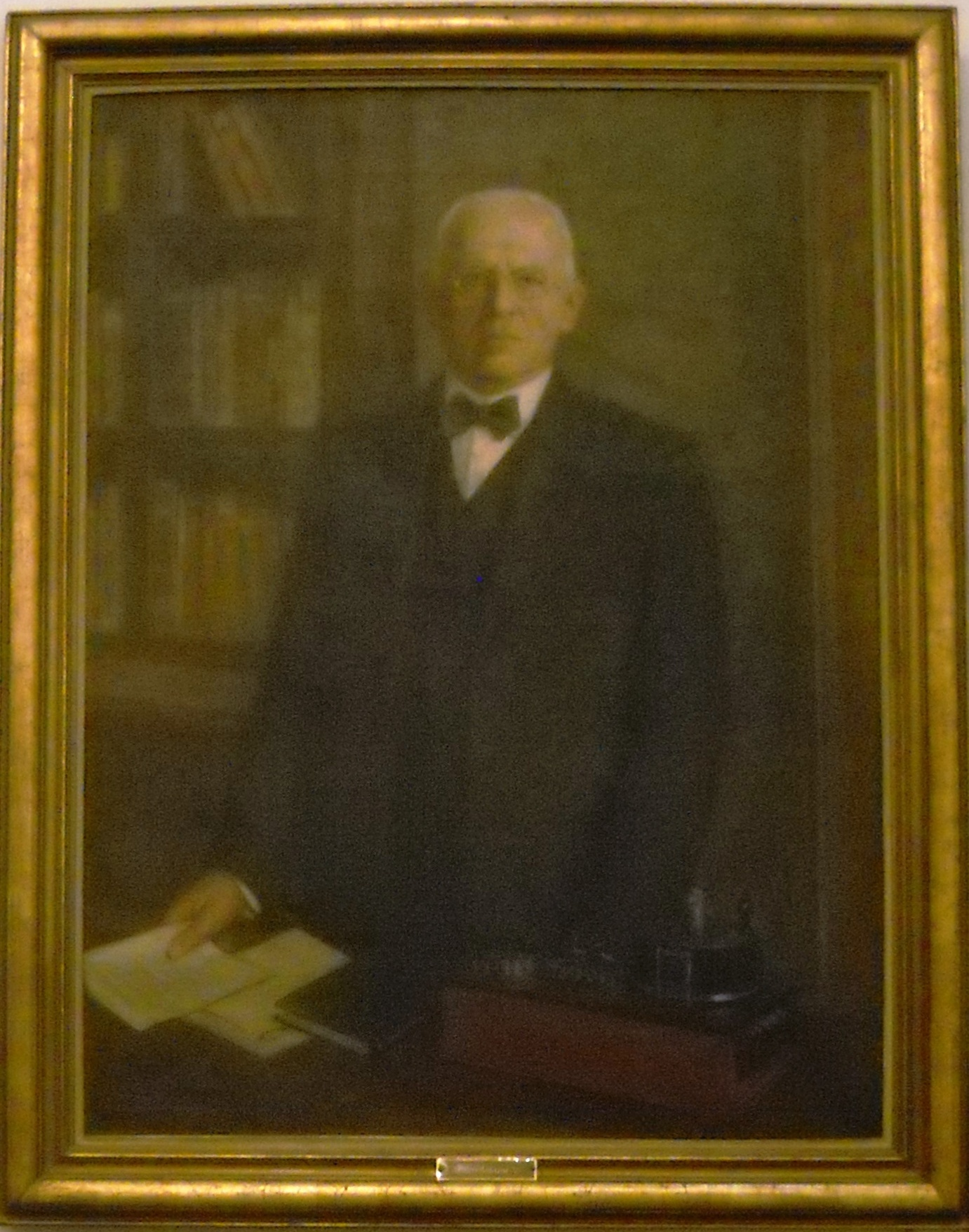
Portrait of Salazar at the School of Engineering

He continued to be a multifaceted scientist: his interest in energy issues led him to propose a visionary project to develop a nationwide, interconnected electrical grid, taking advantage of the great quantity of waterfalls that the mountains provide, without the need for large dams. This vision started to be developed and continues to this day. In recognition of his contributions towards the hydroelectric power development at a national level, ENDESA [the state energy corporation at the time] dedicated a bust of his at the Cipreses hydroelectric power plant, near Talca, in 1955. On the dedication placard he is recognized as "Forerunner of the electrification of the nation".

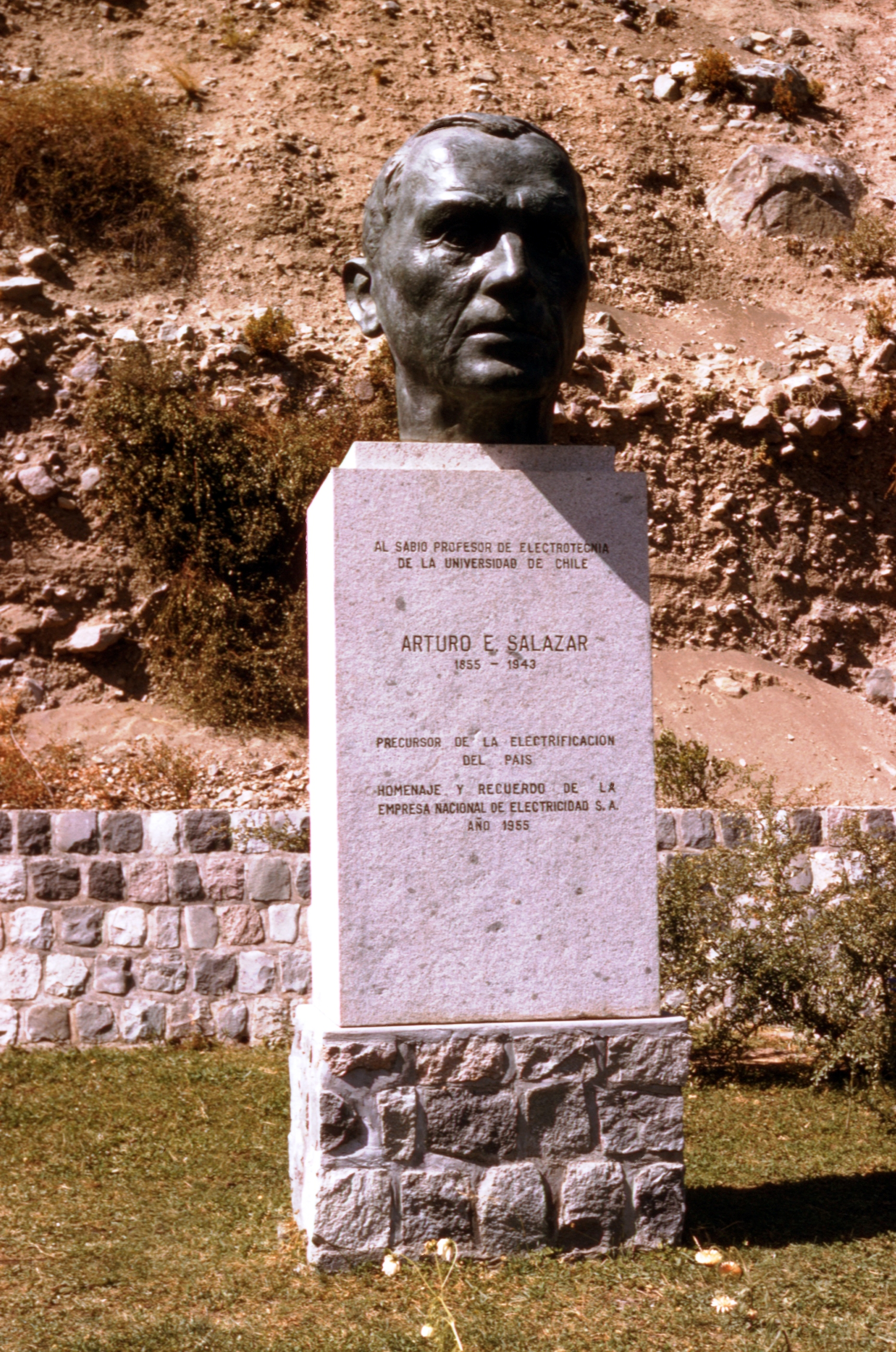
Bust of A. E. Salazar at Cipreses power plant, 1955

In 1902 he married Hortensia Justiniano Maturana, and of their children three survived: Hortensia (Kitty), Eugenio and Renato. Following their father's steps, both sons became engineers specializing in the area of electrical power development. Salazar had three sisters: Clementina, Rosa Elvira and Fortunata, of which only the latter outlived him.

Once retired and devoting his days to his family and frequent trips to their country home in Las Hijuelas, Arturo Salazar died in Santiago on April 3, 1943.

== Accomplishments ==
His accomplishments began at an early age, and following his studies at the French Priest's school in Valparaiso, he started to work at the Havas Agency [news] there. From then he continued with his studies autodidactically. Among other activities while living in this city, according to an anecdote his widow Hortensia Justiniano recalled, he had been hired on one occasion by city authorities to take responsibility for staging the fireworks spectacle for the New Year's celebration activities in the port.

=== Telephone and gramophone ===
At 15 years of age (1870), while working at the news agency, he installed for the first time in Chile, a telephone between the agency offices and the Municipality of Valparaiso. Later, in 1878, upon receiving news of Thomas Edison's invention of the previous year, he built the first working, speaking and recording machine (gramophone) in Chile, using cylinders elaborated and recorded by himself, with voices, songs and sounds of nature. His vocation already was oriented toward teaching and he became physics professor at the Naval Academy from 1883 to 1894, while serving as general manager of the Valparaiso Gas Company.

=== Radiography and collaboration with Luis Ladislao Zegers Recasens ===
In 1896, at age 40, following a study trip to Europe, Salazar moves to Santiago, having been invited to collaborate with Luis Ladislao Zegers, who was tenured professor of industrial physics and electrotechnology in the Engineering School of the Universidad de Chile. It was with him that experiments were conducted leading to the birth of radiology in the nation.

Only three months had elapsed since December 28, 1895, when Wilhelm Conrad Röntgen had delivered the text of a lecture to the "Physikalisch-medizinischen Gesellschaft" in Würzburg. Since this scientific society happened to be on vacation, this lecture, "Ueber eine neue art von stahlen" (On a new form of radiation), was read as a "preliminary communication" on January 23, 1896.

As a result of this publication, the following month, that is in February 1896, professors Zegers and Salazar began experimenting on this new technique in Chile. Success was finally obtained on March 22, 1896, as the first radiograph was made, not only in Chile but in all of Ibero-America. This accomplishment was announced and published on March 27 in the Actes de la Societé Scientifique du Chili (Proceedings of the Scientific Society of Chile), Vol. VI (1896), a monograph of 46 lines: "Experiments on the production of Roentgen rays by means of electric incandescent lights". This was the first work on X-rays published in Latin America. The publication is written in what some termed "rational orthography", which Salazar espoused. The article shows a schematic of the electric circuit used as well as a radiograph of four fingers of Zegers’ right hand, taken five days before the publication. The exposure for this radiograph lasted 14 minutes.

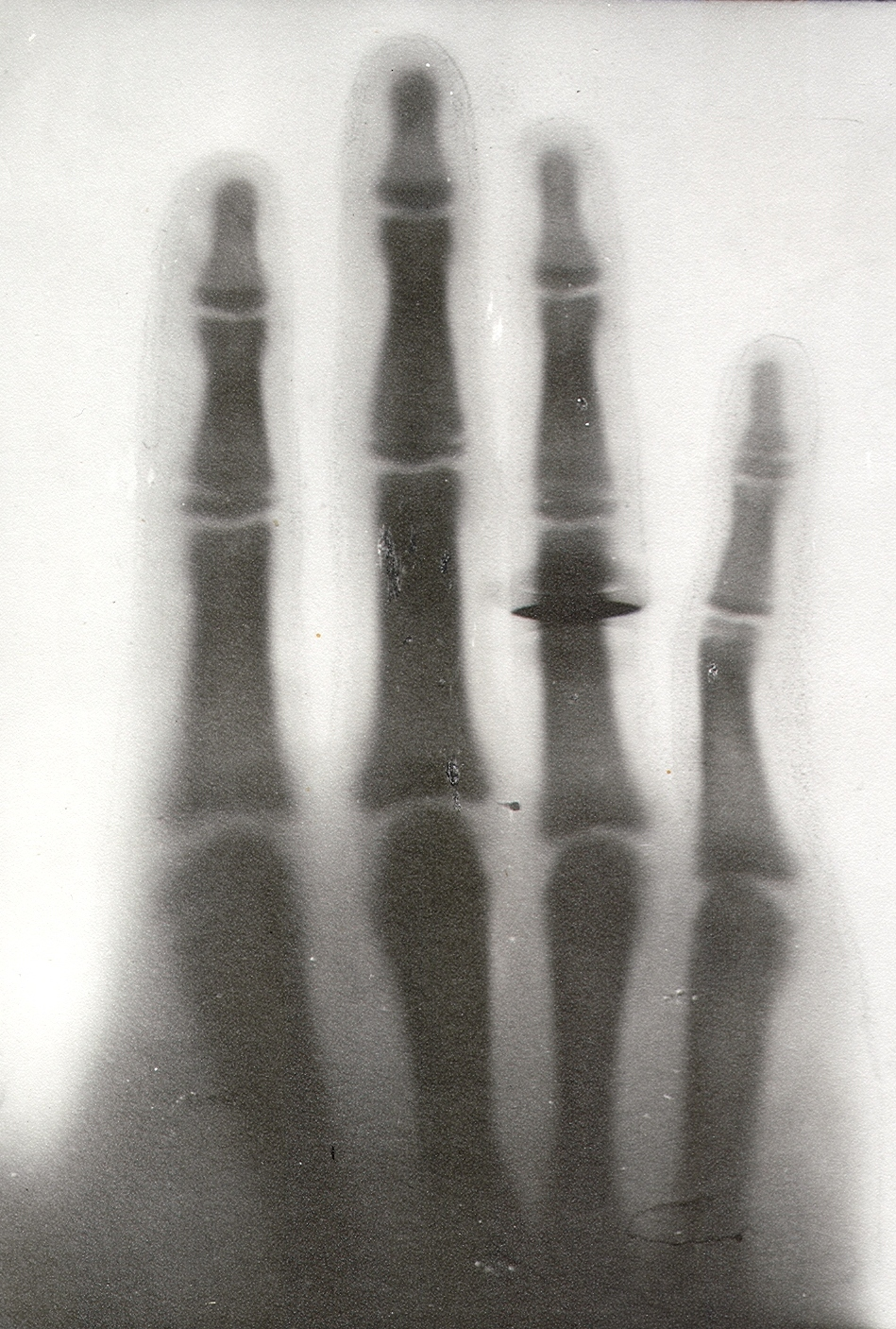
X-ray of Zegers' hand, March 22, 1896

The experiments in taking radiographs didn't turn out to be so simple. It took a month before they could obtain the first radiographs. They were working with an induction coil, with a sufficiently long spark, which they operated using a hand-operated alternator, a Tesla circuit, and a tube made by Salazar. There was at the time not a single Crookes tube in Chile, which is why they began to experiment with light bulbs having a vacuum analogous to these tubes, but lacked the adequate electrodes for the anode. An attempt was made to get an appropriate cathodic flux with these bulbs. This flux of negative particles leaving the filament generate X-rays as a consequence of their collision with an improvised anticathode placed exterior to the light bulb.

As the authors themselves explain in their article: "Upon receiving here on February last the first news about Röntgen's discovery, we saw that it was not possible to replicate this physicist's experiments there being not even a single Crookes tube in all of Chile. However, bearing in mind at the same time certain qualities of incandescent light bulbs, generally known as Edisons, we considered that for the generation of the Röntgen rays one could do without the Crookes tubes or others of the same type. We knew that the vacuum of an incandescent lamp of good quality is comparable to that of the Hittorf or Crookes tubes, and that, furthermore, the degree of vacuum in such lamps improves significantly after illuminating 100 or more hours. As for the lack of specialized electrodes, the only remaining obstacle apparently remaining, we decided to solve it by using the filament as cathode and as anode a tin disc or ring place on the exterior of the lamp."

The thousands of volts discharge applied to the lamp was obtained by using an induction coil (Rühmkorff coil) connected to the primary, with a hand-operated alternator. The result was satisfactory: the glass glowed with a blue fluorescence. It was a while before they realized that the color was due to the lead content of the glass. They then tested Edison bulbs, of lead-free glass, of English manufacture, with which they obtained a light green fluorescence. However, despite that, well-wrapped photographic plates at an adequate distance weren't exposed. They were too old, so that when they were exchanged for freshly made plates with more sensibility, these began to undergo exposure to radiologic images. They were thus able to obtain radiographs fairly regularly. Later on there arrived from Europe adequate tubes for taking radiographs.

In the initial correspondence between Salazar, Zegers and Newman, these images were referred to as "ombrographs".

=== Radiocommunications ===
Traditionally, the first radio transmission to take place in Chile that is celebrated is the one that took place between the seat of the Technical State University and the hall of the newspaper El Mercurio on August 22, 1922. Professor Salazar, along with his assistant in the Electronics department, both great radio enthusiasts, succeeded in this trial with the coordination of the Army Communications Battalion. Professor Salazar had installed the transmitter in the university, while Sazié, using elements personally devised by him for this purpose, installed the receiving station in the hall of El Mercurio.

However, the initial date of radiotelephonic transmissions at a distance was actually in the month of October, 1920. The transmission was made possible due to the initiative of the directors of the Telefunken and Siemens-Schuckert firms, and was done in collaboration with professor Arturo Salazar, doctor José Ducci and engineer Julio Finger. The tests were carried out between the University of Chile and the School of Medicine, taking advantage of antennas already present on those buildings. The trials were done by means a new device for wireless telephony used in the first World War, and the results obtained were deemed irreproachable. The detailed information that can be found in the weekly magazine Zig-Zag of that time, adds the following commentary: "The live voice transmissions that were carried out at the University of Chile were heard most clearly at the School of Medicine, and even several meters away from the receiving apparatus. Also heard were some pieces played on gramophone and the disc of programmed speech of the president elect, Arturo Alessandri". Representing the Telefunken and Siemens Schukert firms were the engineers Mr. Pablo Schafer and Mr. Alberto Sottorff, and this event was also attended by the Director of Telegraphy, Mr. Cifuentes, Coronel Ernesto Medina, and the Commander of the Telegraphy Battalion, Mr. de la Cruz.

The transmissions of August, 1922, would receive greater acclaim due to the artistic element that was introduced in them, which has allowed them to be considered the starting point of radiotelephony activity at a national level. On that occasion it is recalled that the transmission started with the hymn of Yungay, followed by Rafael Maluenda delivering a speech of a humorous political nature. "It was amusing for some [of us] to observe the expressions and ignorance exhibited by many upon seeing the wires attached to the antenna", Sazié would later recall.

=== Championing the electrification of the nation ===
In Santiago, Salazar studied ways to provide, at the turn of the 20th century, the streets of Santiago with electric lighting instead of the existing gas-based system. He highlighted the advantages of an electrical intercommunication network covering all of Chile. He also proposed that electric energy be obtained taking advantage of waterfalls existing throughout the country, that is to say, pressing for hydroelectric power development.

The accomplishments and contributions made by Salazar earned him recognition at an international level and worthy of being cited in the Who's Who in Science – International published in 1913.

== Collaboration with Carlos Newman Andonaegui ==
On the outskirts of the city of Quillota there is location that served in a way as a point of encounter for a circle of academics and intellectuals towards the end of the 19th century, seeing as, according to Boldrini, for a variety of reasons that city "was an important focus for the generation and enjoyment of culture" . This was property inherited from his mother by a transplanted Santiago native that resettled in this area, Carlos Newman Andonaegui. The property was given the name of "Finka Andonaegi" [Andonaegi Estate], a name that it keeps to this day (the reason for it being spelled that way is explained below). Newman and Salazar were contemporaries (Newman was born in 1858) who had both studied at the French Priests school of Valparaiso, and in the decade of the 1880s wound up being professorial colleagues at the Naval Academy, one of chemistry, the other physics. It is from that period that began the extended and close friendship and collaboration between these two scientists, who besides publishing a series of studies, would extend their research beyond the world of science to topics such as writing orthography, the death penalty, and others.

=== "Rational orthography" ===
Consistent with his objective and scientific outlook, Salazar also included himself among a small group of intellectuals and academics that advocated simplifying the inconsistencies existing in the orthography of Spanish, among which the most distinguished living in Chile were Karlos Kabezón and Karlos Newman. This idea of improving writing was not just considered for Spanish, there being analogous proposals for reforming English, French and German, among others. Several of these individuals referred to themselves as "neographers".

Consistent with and in continuation of the ideas of the academics Domingo F. Sarmiento and Andrés Bello, precursors of the orthographic reform of Spanish in Latin America, what was being proposed was to achieve the ideal goal going back to the old yet simple prescription made by Nebrija (1492) "that each letter have its distinct sound; that each sound have its distinct letter", which Kabezón named "the rational orthography" in his book published in 1902.

This idea essentially consisted in simplifying the writing of Spanish, by eliminating the various redundancies, ambiguities and inconsistencies that occur in it. For example, the "neographers" would ask themselves, why are the letters c, the qu and the k used to represent the k [IPA – International Phonetic Alphabet] sound? Furthermore, the c is inconsistent, having two pronunciations depending on the vowel following it. Therefore, the redundant letters c and qu should be eliminated in favor of the k. Also, for example, why are there y and ll (both pronounced ʎ [IPA]), or y and i (pronounced i [IPA])? So, the y should go. Also, what the purpose of the h, never pronounced in Spanish. And so on. Hence, "Finca Andonaegui" becomes "Finka Andonaegi".

In both their personal correspondence as well as in numerous professional publications, both Newman and Salazar used this orthographic convention, as can be seen in the various citations made in this article, as well as in the Bibliography. Even Salazar's wife wrote her letters in accordance to this practice.

=== Health and environmental quality ===
In Chile in 1887 there was a cholera epidemic, resulting in 50,000 deaths. At the Naval Academy laboratory, along with Carlos Newman, Salazar published a study on bacteriology by the name of "Notes on the Asian cholera bacillus" (Valparaiso, 1888), in which they displayed the first microphotographs taken in the country. That same year he published a report on the characteristics of the waters on the hillsides of Valparaiso as well as the results of a clinical and bacteriological examination of some waters in Chile. Professor Salazar was very interested in public health problems. He prepared a study of air quality in the Odeon and Victoria theaters in Valparaiso and of the Municipal Theater in Santiago. This was a work on the degree to which the air was rarified due to the use of gas lighting. This study was published in Italian. His studies on Chilean waters were published in London. In 1895 he wrote an article on "carbon dioxide in some enclosed and inhabited locales", and another "on the air quality in Valparaiso prisons". He also made a study of the quality of ice used for public consumption. In light of the multiplicity and variety of interests, as well as original, modern and unorthodox ideas, professor Arturo Salazar Valencia was known among some of his contemporaries as "crazy Salazar".

=== International contacts ===
Both Newman and Salazar made an effort to stay abreast of the latest scientific and cultural advances at an international level, and to cultivate contacts with the leading exponents of these. On one occasion they extended an invitation for the celebrated North America physicist, Albert Abraham Michelson, to meet with them. Michelson was best known for the innovative experiment he performed in collaboration with his colleague Edward Williams Morley, using interferometry to conclusively determine that the speed of light is constant, independently of the earth's movement, thanks to which it was concluded that there were serious problems with the theory of the existence of ether as the means needed for the propagation of light, a theory that dated back to postulations defended by Christiaan Huygens and others to explain the wave theory of light.

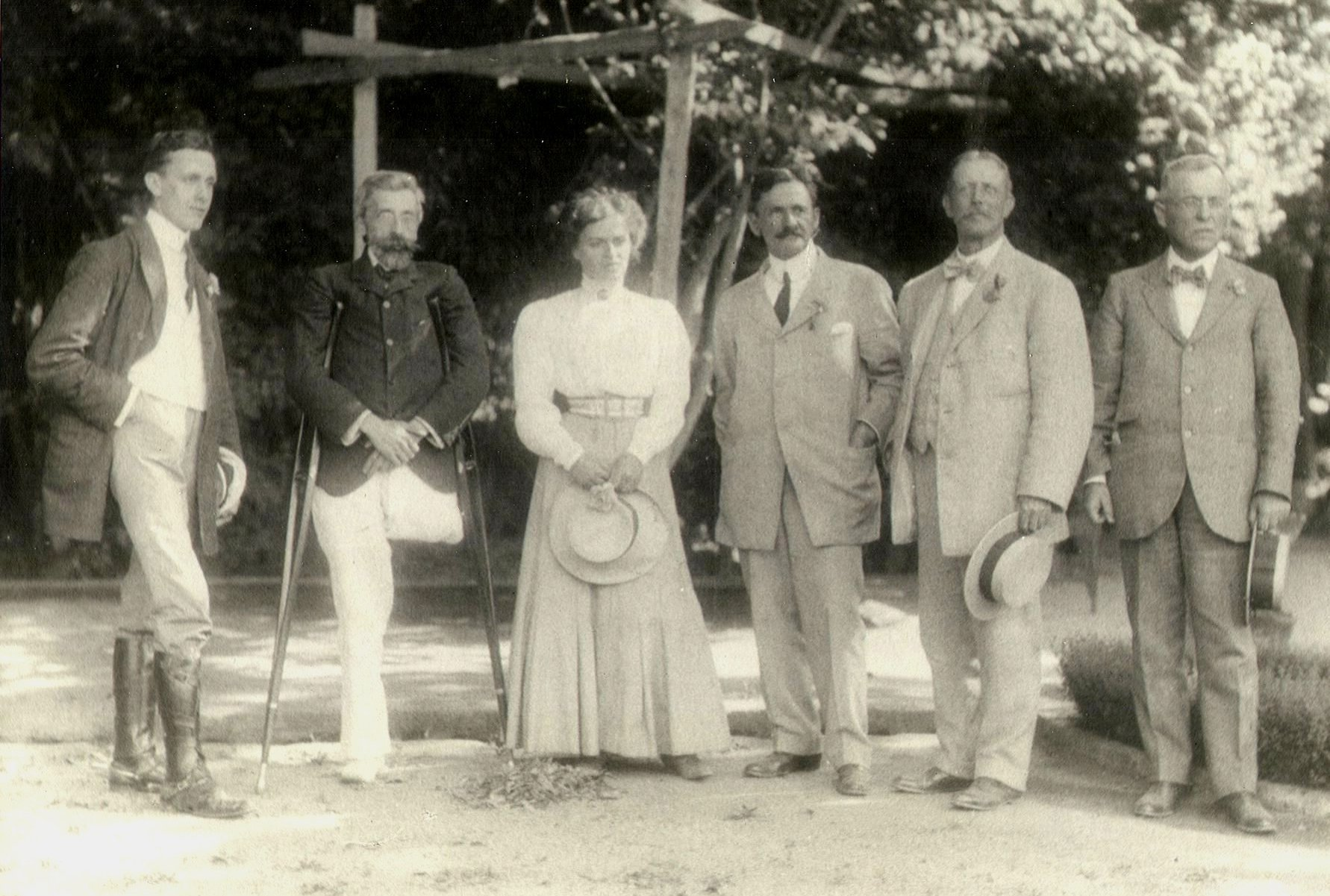
Quillota, c. 1909: M. Blumer, C. Newman, Paulina de Newman, A. A. Michelson, Prof. Simpson, A. E. Salazar

== Pedagogical vision for the hard sciences ==
With regard to the teaching of the sciences, particularly the practical or "hard" sciences, such as engineering and electrotechnology, Salazar, as a self-taught university professor, was always a scathing critic of the methodologies used in his time at secondary and higher learning institutions in Chile.

His criticism was focused on some fundamental points:

1. The rigid and close-minded mentality found in higher learning institutions, as he comments in his 1908 report on an international conference on electrical units:

"The hostility of some, the neophobia of many, the apathy, indifference or indecisiveness of most regarding the need to modify the nature of teaching through experimenting in the manner in which I have indicated, is nothing but a specific manifestation of a more general phenomenon: the deeply embedded scholastic spirit, bequeathed to us by our ancestors along with other principles fatal to the mental and social development of the people to the absolute exclusion of the new philosophy.

Such a state of affairs has nothing to do with the individual's ability or inability; nor does it with the current terms of liberal and conservative, progressive or retrograde, heretic or orthodox, mere expressions serving to obscure individual opposing tendencies.

The Universidad de Chile is considered liberal, the Catholic, orthodox, and neither makes any difference when considered from the same point of view. It's not that they are lacking qualified people, but that the nature of the medium seems to enervate in them the capacity for mental concentration required by scientific research and stress other more superficial character traits. No one could deny that, the way in which our two universities are formed, they limit their functions to produce graduates in various departments by means of a system of yearly examinations that merits the most justified criticism. Aside from that, we could be justly reproved from abroad that broad profusion of words "science" and "scientist" in programs and speeches, in academic receptions and other university functions, when it does not correspond to a more or less vigorous intellectual product with original characteristics, is not science but "scientific snobbery". (pp. 848-849)

2. Lack of practical work performed by students in their science classes.

In his booklet of trigonometric functions he says:

"The experimental and heuristic method, which can be summed up in the formula: "instill in the student the habit of thinking for himself", constitutes, according to modern psychology, the basis for all teaching, particularly teaching science. There is nothing in common between this method – the same one I’ve made an effort to follow since the establishment of this laboratory – and the so-called "exercises" or "practical activities" which, as a complement to the prevailing oral or mnemonic method, are used in the engineering courses lesson plans in this university. Here, just like in other countries – particularly in France, which has been our principal model in matters of secondary and higher teaching – it is held as an unquestionable principle that "the abstract must precede the concrete", "from the theory to the facts", "from the unconscious to the conscious". From that thinking arises the sort of veneration of the deductible or a priori teaching; from that the extreme importance given to lesson and program plans, and the absolutely minimal or nonexistent one to the method; from that comes the absurd current system of tests from memory, that prove nothing, if not the obstinacy of certain aberrations."

In the chapter entitled "A retrospective look" in the report on the 1916 scientific conference:

"In all [United States] universities with an engineering course, the greatest care has been taken in setting up and properly organizing the physics laboratories and those specializing in electrotechnology, in order that the students do not base their learning merely in oral explanations and blackboard expositions. Every lecture course is associated with a laboratory class and the most serious and careful attention to experimental work is demanded from every student. Very little advantage is taken from technical studies if the professor's expositions aren’t constantly associated with experimental work performed by the student himself, scientifically carried out. This situation, which still does not occur in Chile, at least in practice, the importance it deserves is, to a great extent, disdained by more than one of those responsible for teaching". (pág. 15)

3. The excessively narrow focus placed on the learning plans of future technicians and engineers, as he remarks in Chapter 4 of the 1916 report:

"It would seem that the sole function of these learning establishments would be that of imparting knowledge, leaving the "school" of life's experience to make up for the rest, or to be more precise, the essential part". (p. 47)

He goes on to make a contrast with this in the chapter entitled "In 1916. Education before instruction":

"It's a matter of a deficiency not previously felt, or scarcely noted, on the part of general culture, a deficiency we could consider of a psychological nature, in that it has to do with character qualities, which diminishes an engineer's ability, for instance, in one of his most important roles, which the integrating function or organizational capacity. Being called engineer in the most adequate sense of the term implies an individual competent in nature, the "energy" of the physicist, for the best use and profit for humankind. This implies strong participation in the management of human affairs, all the more in that it contributes to the wealth of nations. Therefore, among those traits that contribute to preparing a good engineer, it should not be possible to do without many that have nothing to do with the scientific or technical knowledge acquired by the individual, no matter how strong they are". (p. 25)

"The objective of these four years [in technical institutions in the United States] is to impart to the future engineer a reasonable portion of general culture, such as English or other modern tongue, philosophy, economics, political science, and as much science and professional knowledge as the available time allows". (p. 27)

== Bibliography ==
- Miguel Laborde Duronea, Pioneros del desarrollo – Ciencia, tecnología, industria en Chile, Santiago, 1987, págs. 66–73.
- Reinaldo Harnecker, "Elogio a los profesores Diego A. Torres y Arturo Salazar", Apartado del No 8-9 de los Anales de la Facultad de Matemáticas de la Universidad de Chile (1952).
- Anales del Instituto de Ingenieros de Chile, Año LVI, No 7-8, Julio-Agosto de 1943.
- Tomás F. Strauszer, Comienzos de la radiología en Chile, Santiago, 1994.
- Actes de la Societé Scientifique du Chili (Actas de la Sociedad Científica de Chile), Tome VI (1896).
- Diario de sesiones del Senado, Sesión 43a, en martes 4 de septiembre de 1962.
- "Conmemoran hoy – Primera Emisión Radial Chilena", El Mercurio, Martes 21 de agosto de 1979.
- H. H. Stephenson, ed., Who's Who in Science – International, London, 1913.
- Gustavo Boldrini, Quillota – Una relación personal, Viña del Mar, 1988.
- Karlos Kabezón, Neógrafos contemporáneos – Tentatiba bibliográfika, Santiago, 1896.
- Karlos Kabezón, La ortografía rrazional, Killota, 1902.

=== Publications by Salazar ===
- A. E. Salazar, Karta al señor Presidente de la Societé Scientifique du Chili, sobre Ortografía Rrazional, Santiago, 1894.
- — Kálkulos sobre las kañerías de agua – Ensayos de unifikazion de las Fórmulas Usuales i de simplifikazion de los kálkulos basados en la Nozion de Zirkuito Idráuliko, Santiago, 1898.
- — Trasmision Eléktrika de Potenzia a Largas Distanzias, Santiago, 1899.
- — Informe sobre la Konferenzia Internazional de Unidades Eléktrikas, Santiago, 1908 ("Primer informe presentado al Ministro de Instrucción Pública por el profesor de Electrotecnia i Física Industrial de la Universidad de Chile, sobre la comisión que le fue encomendada en agosto de 1907, para los fines que se espresan", publicado en los Anales de la Universidad de Chile, tomo 212, ene.-jun., Santiago, 1908, pág. 813–857).
- — "Logaritmos, antilogaritmos, senos, kosenos, tanjentes" [folleto], Unibersidad de Chile, Laboratorio de Elektroteknia i Físika Industrial, 1911.
- — Las Funziones Iperbólikas i su aplikazion a Problemas de Injeniería Eléktrika, Killota, 1913.
- — El Kálkulo Esakto de las Líneas de Trasmision kon admitanzia Dieléktrika rrepartida i el Método Iperbóliko Komplejo, Washington, 1916.
- — Informaziones sobre la Sekzion 5a, Subsekzion 3, del Segundo Kongreso Zientífico Panamerikano, Killota, Franzisko Enrríkez, 1916.
- — Estudio sobre el costo de Producción y Distribución de la Energía por Grandes Centrales Térmicas o Hidroeléctricas, Santiago, 1924.
- — Los Magistrales de Fuerza Electromotriz y el Culombmetro de Plata Reproducible, Santiago, 1928.
- — Preliminary Investigation on Cadmium Iodide and Zinc Iodide Cells, Santiago, 1933.
- — Estudio Experimental sobre la Reproductibilidad y Constancia de la Pila Normal de Weston, Universidad de Chile, Santiago, 1934 [en preparación].
- A. E. Salazar and K. Newman, Informe sobre las aguas de algunos zerros de Balparaíso, Balparaíso, 1887.
- — Rresultado del eksámen kimiko i bakteriolójiko de algunas aguas de Chile, 1886–87. Un kuadro en folio.
- — Nota sobre el espirilo del kólera asiátiko (Bacillus komma de Koch), Balparaíso, 1888.
- — Eksamen kímiko i bakteriolójiko de las aguas potables, Londres, 1890.
- — El ielo que se consume en Balparaíso, Santiago, 1893.
- — Informe sobre el agua de la Kebrada Berde, Santiago, 1893.
- — Notas sobre la inestabilidad del ázido oksáliko disuelto en agua, Santiago, 1893.
- — El aire en algunas prisiones de Balparaíso, Santiago, 1893.
- — La Oksidazion del H_{2}S disuelto en agua, Santiago, 1893.
- — El aire en los teatros Odeon, Biktoria (Balparaíso) i Munizipal (Santiago), i en algunos lokales zerrados i abitados, Santiago, 1894.
- — Estudios ijiénikos del aire, Santiago, 1895.
- — Kosto komparatibo en Chile del gas i de la elektrizidad como sistemas de distribuzion de enerjía, Santiago, 1896.
- — Proyekto de Lei sobre medidas nazionales, Balparaiso, 1914.
- L. Zegers and A. E. Salazar, "Esperimentos sobre la produkzion de los rrayos de Roentgen por medio de las lamparillas de kadenzia eléctricas", Actes de la Societé Scientifique du Chili (Actas de la Sociedad Científica de Chile), Tome VI (1896), pp. 21–23.
