= Hijuelas =

- City and Commune
- Location in Chile
- Coordinates: 32°47′55″S 71°08′38″W
- Country: Chile
- Region: Valparaíso
- Province: Quillota

Government
  - Type: Municipality
  - Alcalde: José Saavedra

Area
  - Total: 267.2 km^{2} (103.2 sq mi)
- As of 2002
- Elevation: 257 m (843 ft)

Population (2012 Census)
  - Total: 15,876
  - Density: 59.42/km^{2} (153.9/sq mi)
  - Urban: 8,196
  - Rural: 7,818
- Demonym: Hijuelense

Sex
  - Men: 8,161
  - Women: 7,853
- Time zone: UTC-4 (CLT)
  - Summer (DST): UTC-3 (CLST)
- Area code: country 56 + city 33
- Website: Municipality of Hijuelas

Hijuelas (Spanish pronunciation: [iˈxwelas]) is a city and commune in the Quillota Province of central Chile's fifth region of Valparaíso.

== Geography ==
Hijuelas spans an area of 267.2 km^{2} (103 sq mi) in Chile's Zona Central. It is known as The Capital of the Flowers (Spanish: La Capital de los Flores) as it is the largest producer of flowers in Chile, contributing more than 49% of the nation's total production.

== Demographics ==
According to the 2002 census of the National Statistics Institute, Hijuelas has 16,014 inhabitants (8,161 men and 7,853 women). Of these, 8,196 (51.2%) lived in urban areas and 7,818 (48.8%) in rural areas. The population grew by 14.9% (2,076 persons) between the 1992 and 2002 censuses. Hijuelas hosts 1.04% of the region's population.

== Economy ==
The principal economic activities in Hijuleas are agronomy and agriculture, especially in the cultivation of flowers, plants, trees, and fruits such as avocados and citruses. Its cultivated land, irrigated by the Aconcagua River, provides a high quality microclimate for exporting agricultural products. Also in Hijuelas exists a world-leading company in the production of ornamental bulbs and seeds, whose products are exported to various countries such as Japan, the Netherlands, and others.

== Administration ==
As a commune, Hijuelas is a third-level administrative division of Chile, administered by a municipal council, which is headed by a directly elected alcalde. The current alcalde is Verónica Rossat Arriagada. The communal council has the following members:

- Germán Vicencio Vargas (UDI)
- Luis Frez Naranjo (UDI)
- Viviana Hernández Troncoso (Ind./RN)
- Manuel Arévalo Díaz (PRI)
- Omar Olivares Seura (DC)
- Roxana Saavedra Pimentel (PS)

Within the electoral divisions of Chile, Hijuelas is represented in the Chamber of Deputies by Eduardo Cerda (PDC) and Andrea Molina (UDI) as part of the 10th electoral district, (together with La Ligua, Petorca, Cabildo, Papudo, Zapallar, Puchuncaví, Quintero, Nogales, Calera, La Cruz and Quillota). The commune is represented in the Senate by Ignacio Walker Prieto (PDC) and Lily Pérez San Martín (RN) as part of the 5th senatorial constituency (Valparaíso-Cordillera).
