= Eduardo Cerda =

Chilean politician (1933–2025)

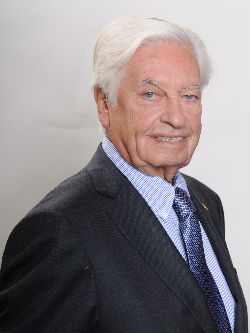

Member of the Chamber of Deputies
- In office 11 March 2010 – 11 March 2014
- Preceded by: Marco Enríquez-Ominami
- Succeeded by: Christian Urizar
- Constituency: 10th District
- In office 11 March 1990 – 11 March 1994
- Preceded by: District created
- Succeeded by: Ignacio Walker
- In office 15 May 1965 – 11 September 1973
- Succeeded by: 1973 coup d'etat
- Constituency: 5th Departamental Group

Councilman of Cabildo
- In office 6 December 2004 – 6 December 2008

President of the Chamber of Deputies
- In office 22 June 1971 – 20 July 1971
- Preceded by: Jorge Ibáñez
- Succeeded by: Fernando Sanhueza Herbage

Mayor of Cabildo
- In office 1960–1966

Personal details
- Born: 1 January 1933 Santiago, Chile
- Died: 19 February 2025 (aged 92) Cabildo, Chile
- Party: Christian Democratic Party (DC)
- Spouse: María del Pilar Lecaros
- Children: Seven
- Education: Pontifical Catholic University of Chile (B.S); Federico Santa María Technical University (M.D)
- Occupation: Politician
- Profession: Agronomist

Eduardo Antonio Cerda García (1 January 1933 – 19 February 2025) was a Chilean politician who served as a Deputy.

He died on 19 February 2025, at the age of 92.

== Family and Early Life ==
He was born on 1 January 1933 in Santiago, Chile. He was the son of Alfredo Cerda, who served as both deputy and senator, and Anita García Velasco.

He was married to María del Pilar Lecaros Mackenna and was the father of seven children. His son, Eduardo Cerda Lecaros, served as mayor of the Municipality of Cabildo from 1996 to 2012.

== Professional Career ==
He studied at the Colegio de los Sagrados Corazones in Santiago. He later entered the Faculty of Agronomy at the Pontifical Catholic University of Chile (PUC), where he graduated as an agricultural engineer in 1955. He subsequently completed postgraduate studies at the Federico Santa María Technical University, specializing in economics.

Among other activities, he was a member of the Mining Association of the Petorca Department and of the peasant cooperative “Nuestra Señora del Carmen.”

In 1989, he founded the family agricultural company Cabilfrut, where he worked alongside most of his children. The company is dedicated to the export of avocados, citrus fruits, and other produce. In parallel, he was active in trade association work, becoming president of the Petorca Farmers’ Association (Agropetorca A.G.), an organization representing farmers in the province.

== Political career ==
A member of the Christian Democratic Party, he began his public career in 1960 as mayor of Cabildo, and was re-elected in the 1963 municipal elections.

Between 1963 and 1964, he served as Aconcagua’s delegate to the National Council of the Christian Democratic Party. In 1964, he was a member of the Provincial Council of the party and vice president of the Communal Center of the Christian Democratic Party in Cabildo. In 1968, he was elected vice president of the party, and later, in 1973, its secretary general.

In 1985, he was appointed secretary general of the Democratic Alliance and actively participated in the Concertación de Partidos por la Democracia. In 1987, he served as national councillor of the Christian Democratic Party.

On 13 May 1993, he resigned from the Christian Democratic Party and decided not to seek re-election as deputy, concluding his service in the Chamber of Deputies of Chile in 1994.

On 2 July 2003, he assumed the presidency of the Christian Democratic Party in the Valparaíso Region and consequently became a national councillor of the party. Between 2004 and 2008, he served as councilor of the Municipality of Cabildo.

In December 2009, he was elected deputy for District No. 10 in the Valparaíso Region for the 2010–2014 term. In the November 2013 parliamentary elections, he ran for re-election in the same district but was not elected.

He died on 19 February 2025.
