= Papudo =

- Town and Commune
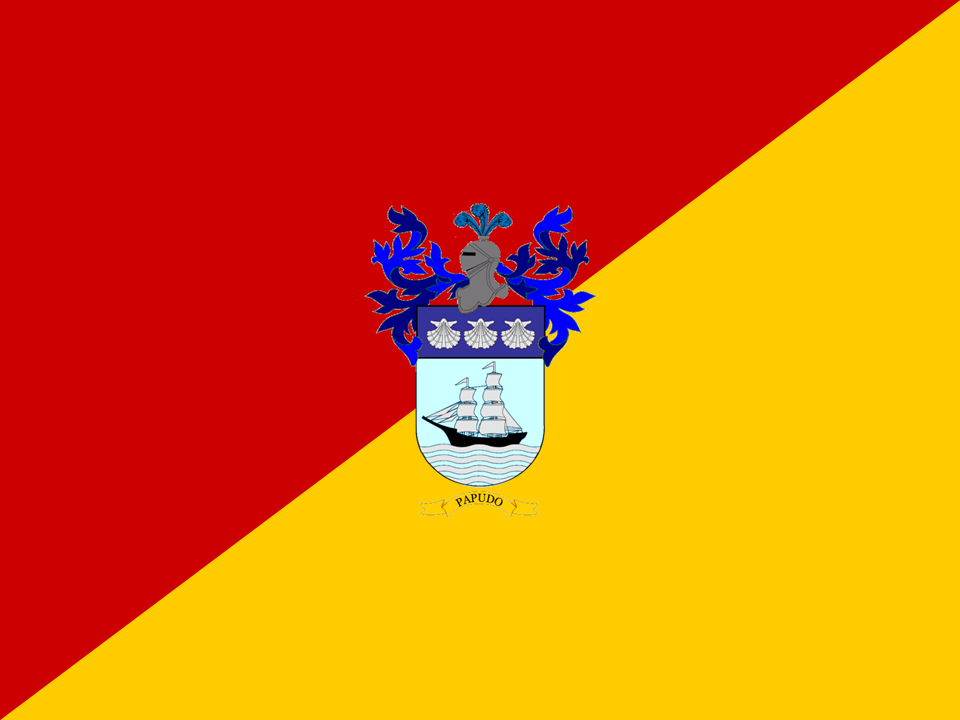
- Flag Coat of arms Location in Chile
- Coordinates: 32°31′S 71°27′W
- Country: Chile
- Region: Valparaíso
- Province: Petorca
- Founded: 1857

Government
  - Type: Municipality
  - Alcalde: Claudia Adasme (RN)

Area
  - Total: 165.5 km^{2} (63.9 sq mi)
- Elevation: 145 m (476 ft)

Population (2012 Census)
  - Total: 5,026
  - Density: 30.37/km^{2} (78.65/sq mi)
  - Urban: 4,343
  - Rural: 265
- Demonym: Papudano

Sex
  - Men: 2,382
  - Women: 2,226
- Time zone: UTC-4 (CLT)
  - Summer (DST): UTC-3 (CLST)
- Area code: 56 + 33
- Website: Municipality of Papudo

Papudo is a Chilean commune located in the Petorca Province, Valparaíso Region. Most of its permanent residents live in the small town of the same name, whereas primarily new development for the affluent population of Santiago concentrates in the southernmost and northernmost regions of the commune. The commune spans an area of 165.6 km^{2} (64 sq mi).

== Demographics ==
According to the 2002 census of the National Statistics Institute, Papudo has 4,608 inhabitants (2,382 men and 2,226 women). Of these, 4,343 (94.2%) lived in urban areas and 265 (5.8%) in rural areas. The population grew by 18.3% (712 persons) between the 1992 and 2002 censuses.

== Administration ==
As a commune, Papudo is a third-level administrative division of Chile administered by a communal council, headed by an alcalde who is directly elected every four years. The 2008-2012 alcalde is Rosa Prieto Valdes. The communal council has the following members:

- Víctor Fazio (RN)
- Renato Guerra (RN)
- Eduardo Reinoso (RN)
- Jaime León (Ind/UDI)
- Cécil Leiva (PDC)
- Benedicto Araya (PS)

Within the electoral divisions of Chile, Papudo is represented in the Chamber of Deputies by Eduardo Cerda (PDC) and Andrea Molina (UDI) as part of the 10th electoral district (together with La Ligua, Petorca, Cabildo, Zapallar, Puchuncaví, Quintero, Nogales, Calera, La Cruz, Quillota and Hijuelas). The commune is represented in the Senate by Ignacio Walker Prieto (PDC) and Lily Pérez San Martín (RN) as part of the 5th senatorial constituency (Valparaíso-Cordillera).

== See also ==
- Iglesia de Nuestra Señora de las Mercedes
- List of towns in Chile
