= Karl von Haimhausen =

German Jesuit theologian and missionary

Karl von Haimhausen (originally Aymausen) (28 May 1692, at Munich, of a noble Bavarian family – 7 April 1767, in Chile) was a German Jesuit theologian and missionary.

== Life ==
On 20 October 1702, he entered the Society of Jesus, and, in 1724, went as a missionary to Chile. He was a professor of theology and for many years rector of the Collegium Maximum at Santiago. Chile having been constituted an independence province of the order in 1624, Father Haimhausen was made provincial procurator, master of novices, and instructor. He acted as confessor to Spanish bishops and the viceroy.

Haimhausen completed the college church in Santiago, and built a novitiate establishment and two houses for spiritual retreats, with churches attached to them. He also promoted local economic and industrial development. Haimhausen founded an arts-and-crafts school at Calera, near Santiago, with assistance from Germany. Here the ateliers of the bell-founder, the watchmaker and the goldsmith, the organ-builder and the furniture maker, and the studios of the painter and sculptor turned out products never before made in Chile.

== Writings ==
Two letters of Haimhausen are published in the Welt-Bott, nos. 203 and 776. The manuscript of an apologia for the Society of Jesus, written in 1755, was found in the archives of the Foreign Office at Santiago.
