= Cabildo, Chile =

Cabildo
- City and Commune
- Location in Chile
- Coordinates: 32°25′39″S 71°03′59″W
- Country: Chile
- Region: Valparaíso
- Province: Petorca

Government
  - Type: Municipality
  - Alcalde: Víctor Donoso (DC)

Area
  - Total: 1,455.3 km^{2} (561.9 sq mi)
- Elevation: 176 m (577 ft)

Population (2012 Census)
  - Total: 19,315
  - Density: 13.272/km^{2} (34.375/sq mi)
  - Urban: 12,453
  - Rural: 6,463

Sex
  - Men: 9,466
  - Women: 9,450
- Time zone: UTC-4 (CLT)
  - Summer (DST): UTC-3 (CLST)
- Area code: 56 + 33
- Website: Municipality of Cabildo

Cabildo is a Chilean city and commune located in the Petorca Province, Valparaíso Region. The commune spans an area of 1,455.3 km^{2} (562 sq mi).

== Demographics ==
According to data from the 2002 Census of Population and Housing, Cabildo had 18,916 inhabitants; of these, 12,453 (65.8%) lived in urban areas and 6,463 (34.2%) in rural areas. At that time, there were 9,466 men and 9,450 women. The population grew 8.0% (1,396 persons) from the 1992 census count of 17,520.

== Administration ==
As a commune, Cabildo is a third-level administrative division of Chile administered by a communal council, headed by an alcalde who is directly elected every four years. The 2008-2012 alcalde is Eduardo Cerda Lecaros. The communal council has the following members:

- Fernando Rodrigo Olmos Saavedra: (RN)
- Alberto Patricio Aliaga Díaz (DC)
- Margarita Mora Olivares (DC)
- Ricardo Abel Altamirano Olguín
- Sonia María Aguilera Sánchez (RN)
- Juana Isabel Zamora Olmos (RN)

Within the electoral divisions of Chile, Cabildo is represented in the Chamber of Deputies by Eduardo Cerda (PDC) and Andrea Molina (UDI) as part of the 10th electoral district, (together with La Ligua, Petorca, Papudo, Zapallar, Puchuncaví, Quintero, Nogales, Calera, La Cruz, Quillota and Hijuelas). The commune is represented in the Senate by Ignacio Walker Prieto (PDC) and Lily Pérez San Martín (RN) as part of the 5th senatorial constituency (Valparaíso-Cordillera).
