= Las Ventanas =

Coordinates: 32°44′S 71°29′W

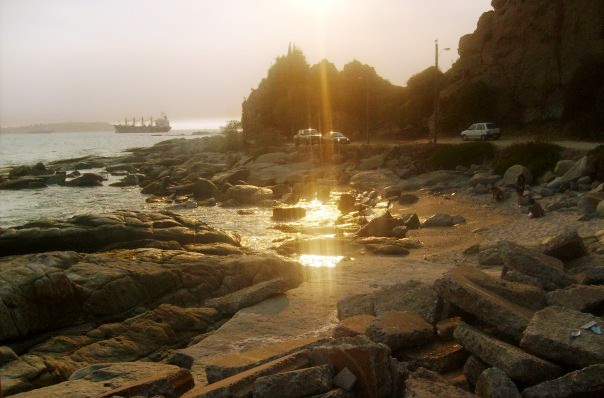
Ventans 2.jpg

Las Ventanas is a Chilean city in Puchuncaví commune, Valparaíso Province, Valparaíso Region. Pop. 5,957 (2002 census).
