= Quillota Province =

Quillota Province Provincia de Quillota
- Province
- Seal

- Location in the Valparaíso Region

- Location in Chile
- Coordinates: 32°52′S 71°14′W
- Country: Chile
- Region: Valparaíso
- Capital: Quillota
- Communes: List of 5: Quillota; La Calera; Nogales; Hijuelas; La Cruz

Government
  - Type: Provincial
  - Presidential Provincial Delegate: José Orrego Ramírez (Democratic Revolution)

Area
  - Total: 1,113.1 km^{2} (429.8 sq mi)
  - Rank: 7

Population (2012 Census)
  - Total: 190,525
  - Rank: 3
  - Density: 171.17/km^{2} (443.32/sq mi)
  - Urban: 151,366
  - Rural: 24,551

Sex
  - Men: 86,620
  - Women: 89,297
- Time zone: UTC-4 (CLT)
  - Summer (DST): UTC-3 (CLST)
- Area code: country 56 + area 33
- Website: Delegation of Quillota

Quillota Province (Spanish: Provincia de Quillota) is one of eight provinces of the central Chilean region of Valparaíso (V). Its capital is the city of Quillota (pop. 75,916).

== Administration ==
As a province, Quillota is a second-level administrative division, governed by a provincial delegate who is appointed by the president.

=== Communes ===
The province comprises five communes (Spanish: comunas), each governed by a municipality consisting of an alcalde and municipal council:

- Quillota (capital)
- La Calera
- Nogales
- Hijuelas
- La Cruz

== History ==
On March 11, 2010, the communes of Limache and Olmué were transferred to Marga Marga Province under Law 20,368 (signed August 25, 2009).

== Geography and demography ==
The province spans a landlocked area of 1,113.1 km^{2} (430 sq mi), the smallest in the Valparaíso Region with the exception of Isla de Pascua (Easter Island). According to the 2002 census, Quillota is the third most populous province in the region with a population of 175,917. At that time, there were 151,366 people living in urban areas, 24,551 people living in rural areas, 86,620 men and 89,297 women.
