= Lily Pérez =

Chilean publicist and politician

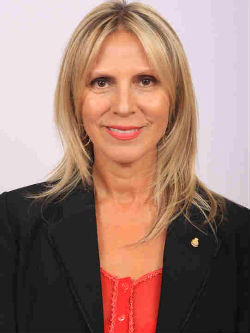

Member of the Senate of Chile
- In office 11 March 2010 – 11 March 2018
- Preceded by: Sergio Romero Pizarro
- Succeeded by: Constituency dissolved
- Constituency: Constituency 5

Member of the Chamber of Deputies of Chile
- In office 2 October 2008 – 11 March 2010
- Preceded by: Pedro Álvarez-Salamanca
- Succeeded by: Pedro Álvarez-Salamanca Ramírez
- Constituency: District 38

Member of the Chamber of Deputies of Chile
- In office 11 March 1998 – 11 March 2006
- Preceded by: Mariana Aylwin
- Succeeded by: Gonzalo Duarte
- Constituency: District 26

Councilor of La Florida
- In office 26 September 1992 – 6 December 1996

Personal details
- Born: Lilia Jovanka Pérez San Martín; 10 May 1963 (age 63) Santiago, Chile
- Party: Renovación Nacional (1993–2014); Amplitude (2014–2018); Independent (2018–present)
- Spouse: Miguel Bauzá
- Children: 2
- Education: University of the Pacific; Gabriela Mistral University
- Occupation: Publicist, politician

Lily Jovanka Pérez San Martín (born May 10, 1963) is a Chilean publicist and politician. She served as a councilor for La Florida from 1992 to 1996, a deputy for District 26 from 1998 to 2006, a deputy for District 36 from 2008 to 2010, and a senator for Constituency 5 from 2010 to 2018. Furthermore, she was the president of the now-defunct Amplitude party from 2014 to 2018.

== Early life and career ==
Liliana Pérez was born on 10 May 1963 in Santiago. She is the daughter of Samuel Manuel Pérez Baeza and Liliana Beatriz San Martín Zavala. Later, she changed her legal name to Lily. She completed her primary and secondary schooling at the Hebrew Institute. She graduated as a publicist from the University of the Pacific and earned a postgraduate degree in political philosophy from Gabriela Mistral University.

In her professional life, Pérez served as a member of the editorial committee of the newspaper La Nación from 1993 to 1996. She also contributed to La Época and La Tercera as a writer.

== Political career ==
=== Councilor ===
In 1992, Pérez was elected councilor for La Florida. During her four-year term, together with the mayors of Las Condes (Joaquín Lavín) and Santiago (Jaime Ravinet), she founded the Chilean Association of Municipalities, becoming its first vice president. In 1993, she joined the Renovación Nacional (RN) party, and became part of its political commission. She was the party's president of mayors and councilors until 1996. In 1996, she presented herself as a candidate for mayor or La Florida, but was not elected, and resigned as a councilor.

=== Deputy ===
Pérez was presented as a candidate for the Chamber of Deputies in the 1997 parliamentary election, for District 26, corresponding to the commune of La Florida. During her tenure, she was a member of the permanent commissions of interior government, regionalization, planning and social development, housing and urban development, and family. She also participated in the investigative commission of Casas Copeva, social housing located in the Puente Alto commune supplied by the Ministry of Housing and Urbanism (Minvu) that had serious construction problems.

She was reelected handily in the 2001 parliamentary election. On that occasion, she was a member of the permanent commissions of national defense, housing and urban development, foreign relations, interparliamentary affairs, and Latin American integration. She was also part of the special commission on actions by public officials in the "Matute Johns Case".

In 2005, Pérez was a candidate for senator for the Santiago Oriente constituency in that year's parliamentary election, but did not win a seat. In 2006, she was elected secretary general of RN, a position she held until the end of 2008, being replaced by Bruno Baranda.

On 2 October 2008, she became a deputy for District 38 for 16 months, replacing the late Pedro Álvarez-Salamanca. This time, she represented the Maule Region. During her tenure, she participated in the permanent commission on human rights, nationality, and citizenship.

=== Senator ===
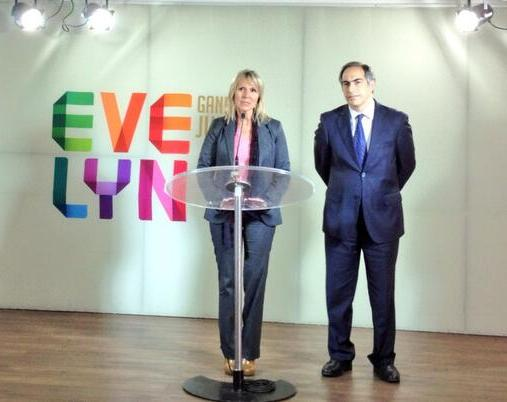
Pérez, as spokesperson for Evelyn Matthei's campaign, together with Francisco Chahuán in 2013

In December 2009, she was elected senator on behalf of RN, for the Valparaíso Cordillera Region (Constituency 5) with the first majority within the Coalition for Change. She was a member of the housing and urban planning commissions, and presided over the commission on human rights, nationality, and citizenship.

In 2013, she became the spokesperson for presidential candidate Evelyn Matthei.

On 16 January 2014, she resigned from her membership in RN, accusing its board of directors, headed by Carlos Larraín, of "intolerance, classism, and personalism." Later that year, she joined the Amplitude political movement, and was elected president of its national board in June 2016.

As a senator, she was involved in the passage of legislation relating to discrimination, such as the Zamudio Law and the Law Against Incitement to Violence. She is a supporter of abortion on three grounds - when the mother's life is at risk, when the fetus will not survive the pregnancy, and in the case of rape.

== Personal life ==
Pérez is married to the lawyer Miguel Bauzá and has two children from her first marriage, as well as five stepdaughters. In 2010, she became the victim of a Neo-Nazi attack in Viña del Mar, but she escaped without serious injuries. In March 2011, she experienced an episode of viral trigeminal neuralgia, which resulted in temporary facial paralysis. She received treatment for this condition at the Clínica Alemana de Santiago.
