= La Ligua =

- City and Commune
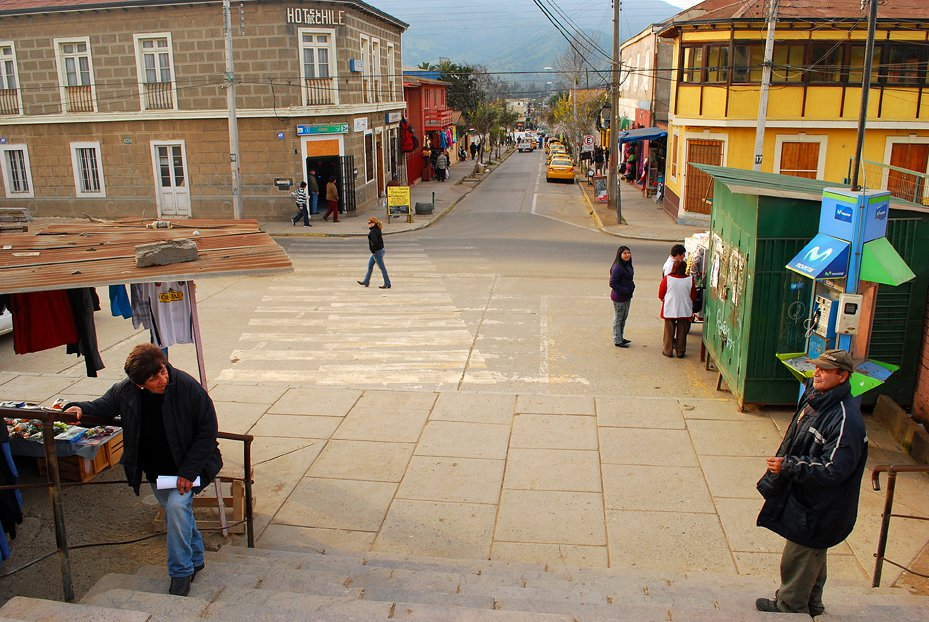
- La Ligua

- Coat of arms Location in Chile
- Coordinates: 32°27′S 71°13′W
- Country: Chile
- Region: Valparaíso
- Province: Petorca
- Founded: 1754

Government
  - Type: Municipality
  - Alcalde: Patricio Pallares

Area
  - Total: 1,163.4 km^{2} (449.2 sq mi)
- Elevation: 126 m (413 ft)

Population (2012 Census)
  - Total: 32,131
  - Density: 27.618/km^{2} (71.531/sq mi)
  - Urban: 24,214
  - Rural: 7,773

Sex
  - Men: 16,079
  - Women: 15,908
- Time zone: UTC-4 (CLT)
  - Summer (DST): UTC-3 (CLST)
- Area code: 56 + 33
- Website: Official website (in Spanish)

La Ligua (Spanish pronunciation: [la ˈliɣwa]) is a city and commune that is the capital of Petorca Province in the Valparaíso Region of Chile. Covering an area of 1,163.4 square kilometers (449.2 sq mi), the commune is situated within a diverse landscape of marine plains and transverse valleys, and is traversed by several rivers including the La Ligua and Petorca. It has a Mediterranean and semi-arid climate, with low annual precipitation and extended dry seasons. As of the 2022 census, La Ligua had a population of 31,987, with the majority residing in urban areas.

== History ==
The name La Ligua is thought to derive either from the Aymara word Lihua, meaning "wool to be distributed for the household", or the Mapuche word Lihuen, meaning "radiance" or "dawn". Archaeological evidence indicates continuous human habitation for approximately 8,000 years, including cultures such as the Animas, Molle, Aymara, and Mapuche. The Inca reached the area around 1420. Spanish colonization began in 1536, leading to the assimilation and eventual disappearance of indigenous cultures.

Gold mining was the dominant economic activity during the colonial period. In the early 20th century, the economy shifted towards textile production, rooted in indigenous practices but modernized with European techniques. By the 1970s, the region specialized in vest-making (chalequería) and candy production, fostering a network of small businesses utilizing digital technologies. La Ligua was founded by decree on 21 June 1754 as Villa de Santo Domingo de Rozas and was designated a city on 3 June 1874.

== Geography ==
The territory of La Ligua covers 1,163.4 square kilometers (449.2 sq mi), located within the geomorphological units of marine or fluviomarine plain and transverse valleys. It is also located within the hydrographic basins of the coastal areas of the La Ligua River and Aconcagua River. Additionally, the commune contains various bodies of water, among which the La Ligua River and Petorca River stand out.

The La Ligua River basin spans approximately 1,980 square kilometers (760 sq mi), originating as the Alicahue stream in the foothills of the Andes at about 4,000 meters (13,000 ft) above sea level. The river becomes the La Ligua River after merging with the Estero Cajón de los Ángeles near the town of Cabildo and flows into the Pacific Ocean, converging with the Petorca River at the Salinas de Pullally wetland.

According to the Köppen climate classification, it presents a Mediterranean climate with winter rainfall (Csb), Mediterranean climate with winter rainfall at altitude (Csb (h)), semi-arid climate (BSk), semi-arid climate with winter rainfall (BSk (s)), and semi-arid climate with winter rainfall and coastal influence (BSk (s) (i)), characterized by low annual precipitation averaging 21.56 mm and approximately 21.68 rainy days per year.

== Demographics ==
According to data from the 2022 Chilean census, La Ligua had 31,987 inhabitants; of these, 24,214 (75.7%) lived in urban areas and 7,773 (24.3%) in rural areas. At that time, there were 16,079 men and 15,908 women. The commune lies along Ruta 5 Norte (Pan-American Highway), which provides efficient access to Santiago in under two hours and facilitates regional and international connectivity.
