= Zapallar =

- Town and Commune
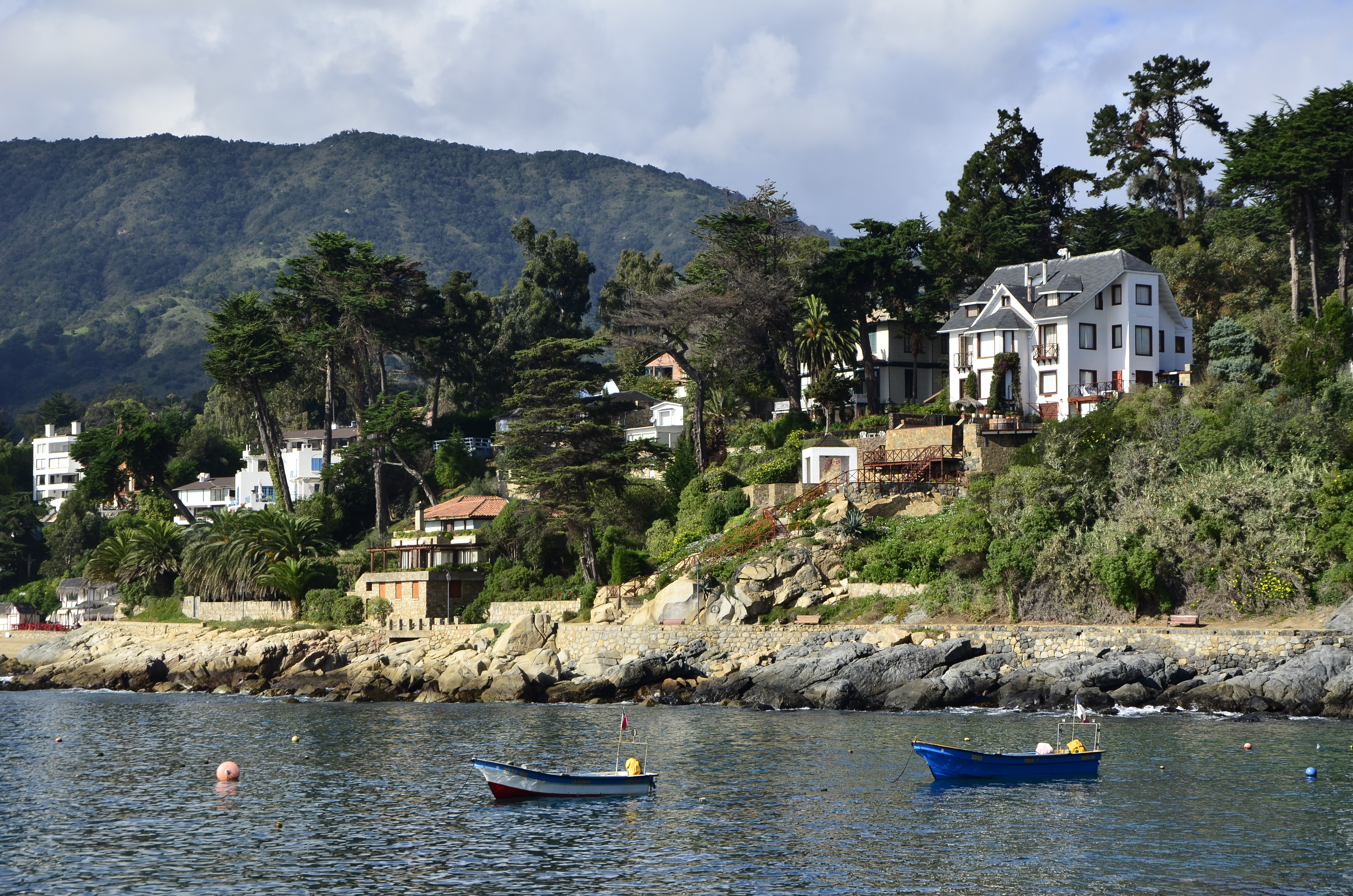
- Coast of Zapallar

- Flag Coat of arms Location in Chile
- Coordinates: 32°33′13″S 71°27′32″W
- Country: Chile
- Region: Valparaíso
- Province: Petorca

Government
  - Type: Municipality
  - Alcalde: Gustavo Alessandri

Area
  - Total: 288.0 km^{2} (111.2 sq mi)
- Elevation: 50 m (160 ft)

Population (2017 Census)
  - Total: 7,339
  - Density: 25.48/km^{2} (66.00/sq mi)
  - Urban: 5,013
  - Rural: 2,326

Sex
  - Men: 3,704
  - Women: 3,635
- Time zone: UTC-4 (CLT)
  - Summer (DST): UTC-3 (CLST)
- Area code: 56 + 33
- Climate: Csb
- Website: Municipality of Zapallar

Zapallar is a resort town located on the coast of the Pacific Ocean in Chile's Petorca Province, approximately 125 kilometres (78 mi) northwest of Santiago. It is also a third-level administrative division of Chile, part of the Valparaíso administrative division. It is administered by a communal council and is headed by an alcalde elected every four years, and As of 2016, Gustavo Alessandri Bascuñán is the mayor.

== Demographics ==
According to the 2002 census of the National Statistics Institute, Zapallar had 5,659 inhabitants (2,914 men and 2,745 women). Of these, 4,744 (83.8%) lived in urban areas and 915 (16.2%) in rural areas. The population grew by 24.3% (1,105 persons) between the 1992 and 2002 censuses.

== Climate ==
Climate data for Zapallar
Month	Jan	Feb	Mar	Apr	May	Jun	Jul	Aug	Sep	Oct	Nov	Dec	Year
Mean daily maximum °C (°F)	22.6 (72.7)	22.1 (71.8)	19.2 (66.6)	17.9 (64.2)	16.0 (60.8)	14.9 (58.8)	14.1 (57.4)	14.6 (58.3)	15.6 (60.1)	17.2 (63.0)	19.4 (66.9)	21.7 (71.1)	17.9 (64.3)
Daily mean °C (°F)	17.7 (63.9)	17.6 (63.7)	16.2 (61.2)	14.1 (57.4)	12.8 (55.0)	11.9 (53.4)	11.2 (52.2)	11.5 (52.7)	12.2 (54.0)	13.4 (56.1)	14.8 (58.6)	16.6 (61.9)	14.2 (57.5)
Mean daily minimum °C (°F)	14.0 (57.2)	14.1 (57.4)	13.0 (55.4)	11.1 (52.0)	10.0 (50.0)	9.2 (48.6)	8.4 (47.1)	8.5 (47.3)	9.2 (48.6)	10.2 (50.4)	11.2 (52.2)	12.6 (54.7)	11.0 (51.7)
Average precipitation mm (inches)	3.1 (0.12)	0.9 (0.04)	1.4 (0.06)	13.5 (0.53)	71.8 (2.83)	120.5 (4.74)	76.1 (3.00)	54.2 (2.13)	28.8 (1.13)	9.9 (0.39)	2.5 (0.10)	1.6 (0.06)	384.3 (15.13)
Average relative humidity (%)	80	80	83	85	86	86	85	84	84	82	80	78	83
Source: Bioclimatografia de Chile

== Zapallar Casas Viejas Airport ==
Zapallar Casas Viejas Airport (Spanish: Aeropuerto de Zapallar Casas Viejas, (ICAO: SCZC)) is a public airport 20 kilometres (12 mi) inland from Zapallar. It has a single 450m long grass runway.

== See also ==
- List of towns in Chile
