= Larraín family =

Chilean family

Larraín family Familia Larraín
- Aristocracy family
- Country: Chile
- Origin: Etxarri-Aranatz, Navarre
- Founder: Santiago de Larraín y Vicuña; Martín José de Larraín y Salas
- Connected families: Vicuña family Subercaseaux family

The Larraín family (Spanish: Familia Larraín) is a Chilean aristocratic family of Basque descent. The Larraín family is divided into two branches, Los Marqueses (The Marquess), the descendants of Santiago de Larraín y Vicuña who arrived in Chile in 1685, and Los Ochocientos (The 800s), the descendants of Martín José de Larraín y Salas who arrived in Chile in 1733.

== Los Marqueses ==
- Santiago de Larraín y Vicuña (1666– 1748), knight of the Order of Santiago, president of the Royal Audiencia of Quito and founder of Los Marqueses; married Mónica Teresa de la Cerda y Hermúa
  - Juan Francisco Javier de Larraín de la Cerda (1700–1776); married María Josefa de Lecaros y Lecaros
    - Agustín Larraín Lecaros (1746–1784); married Ana Josefa Guzmán Peralta Lecaros
      - José Toribio de Larraín y Guzmán, 1st Marquis of Larraín (1784–1829); married María de los Dolores de Moxó y López Fuertes; great-grandson of Santiago de Larraín y Vicuña
        - José Rafael Larraín Moxó (1813–1892), farmer, banker and Conservative Party politician; married Victoria Prieto Warnes, daughter of President Joaquín Prieto
          - Luis Gonzaga Larraín Prieto (1859–1938) farmer and politician; first marriage to Laura Roberts Valdés; second marriage to Gabriela Saavedra
    - Juan Francisco Larraín Lecaros (1757–c. 1809); married Augustina Rojas Ruiz de Gamboa
      - Juan Francisco Larraín Rojas (1788–1836) politician; married María Mercedes de Gandarillas y Aránguiz
        - José Patricio Larraín Gandarillas (1817–1904) farmer and politician; first marriage Virginia Eyzaguirre Larraín; second marriage Carolina Alcalde Velasco
          - Enrique Larraín Alcalde (1861–1938) lawyer, diplomat, politician and farmer; married Victoria Morandé Vicuña
            - Augusto Larraín Morandé (c. 1905–1937) athlete, football player and polo player
          - Patricio Larraín Alcalde (1852–1927) politician and General
        - Maria Francisca De La Trinidad Larraín Gandarillas (1814–1863); married José Miguel Irarrázaval Alcalde (1801–1848) lawyer and politician
          - Carlos Irarrázaval Larraín (1841–1920) lawyer and politician; married Nicolasa Correa Blanco
          - José Miguel Yrarrázaval Larraín (1848–1907) lawyer and politician; married Ana Larraín Prieto
            - Joaquín Yrarrázabal Larraín (1886–1947) lawyer and politician; married Ana Donoso Fóster
              - Paz Yrarrázaval Donoso (1931–2010) actress
        - Joaquín Larraín Gandarillas (1822–1897) lawyer, priest and Theologian
        - Francisco de Borja Larraín Gandarillas (1824–1887) farmer and politician; married Pilar Valdés Ortúzar
        - Ladislao Larraín Gandarillas (1833–1901) farmer and politician; married Elisa Irarrázaval Larraín
      - Agustín Larraín Rojas (1790–1853) politician; married Matilde Cisternas y Martínez de la Torres

=== Other members ===
- Francisco Ruiz-Tagle Portales (1790–1860) politician and Provisional President; married his cousin Rosario Larraín Rojas. Great-grandson of Juan Francisco Javier de Larraín de la Cerda (1700–1776)
- Pablo Larraín Tejada (1894–1982) lawyer and politician; married Luz Orrego Méndez Great-grandson of José Toribio de Larraín y Guzmán. 1st Marquis of Larraín (1784–1829).

== Los Ochocientos ==
- Fra. Joaquín de Larraín y Salas (1754–1824) Mercedarian Friar and politician; great-nephew of Santiago de Larraín y Vicuña
- Martín José de Larraín y Salas (1756–1835) politician and founder of Los Ochocientos; first marriage to Josefa de Aguirre; second marriage to Boza Andía-Yrarrázabal
  - Juan de Dios de Larraín y Aguirre (1799–1818) soilder
  - Bruno de Larraín y Aguirre (1803–1868) politician and lawyer; married Carmen de la Barra Tagle
  - Vicente de Larraín y Aguirre (1805–1882) politician; married Mercedes de Vicuña y Alcalde
    - Amalia Larraín y Vicuña (1832–1928) composer, socialite and philanthropist; married Diego Armstrong y Gana
    - Virginia Larraín y Vicuña (1845–1891) step-mother of Inés Echeverría Bello; married Félix María Echeverría Valdés

=== Vicuña Larraín branch ===
- Francisco Ramón De Vicuña Larraín (1775– 1849) farmer, politician, and twice Vice President of Chile; great-great-great-nephew of Santiago de Larraín y Vicuña; married Mariana de Aguirre y Boza (baptised 1775), Vice First Lady of Chile
  - Pedro Félix Vicuña Aguirre (1805–1874) journalist, merchant, politician and founding member of El Mercurio de Valparaíso; married Carmen Mackenna Vicuña, daughter of Juan Mackenna
    - Benjamín Vicuña Mackenna (1831– 1886), lawyer, politician and writer; married his cousin Victoria Subercaseaux Vicuña (1848–1931) socialite and philanthropist
  - Magdalena Vicuña Aguirre (1817–1913) socialite and philanthropist; married Ramón Subercaseaux Mercado (1790–1859) businessperson and politician
    - Antonio Subercaseaux Vicuña (1843–1911) politician; married Adela Gertrudis Pérez Flores, daughter of President José Joaquín Pérez
      - Ramón Guillermo del Carmen Subercaseaux Pérez (1872–1959) civil engineer, economist and politician; married Mercedes Rivas Ramírez
    - Victoria Subercaseaux Vicuña (1848–1931) socialite and philanthropist; married her cousin Benjamín Vicuña Mackenna (1831– 1886), lawyer, politician and writer
      - Benjamín Vicuña Subercaseaux (1875–1911) writer, journalist and diplomat
    - Ramón Subercaseaux Vicuña (1854–1937) writer, painter, politician and diplomat; married Amalia Errázuriz de Subercaseaux (1860–1930) writer and president of the Chilean Ladies League, daughter of Maximiano Errázuriz Valdivieso
      - Pedro Subercaseaux Errázuriz (1880–1956) painter, illustrator and monk; married Elvira Lyon Otaegui (Note: Later annulled by the Pope so that both could join religious orders)
      - Luis Subercaseaux Errázuriz (1882–1973) diplomat and athlete; married Margarita Donoso Foster
      - Blanca Subercaseaux de Valdés (c. 1885-1887–1965), writer and artist; married Horacio Valdés Ortúzar, engineer
        - Francisco Valdés Subercaseaux (1908–1982) Capuchin missionary. Declared "venerable" by Pope Francis in 2014.
        - Gabriel Valdés (1919–2011) lawyer, diplomat, academic and politician; married Sylvia Soublette (1924–2020) composer, singer, choirmaster and educator
          - Juan Gabriel Valdés (born 1947) politician and diplomat: married Antonia Echenique Celis
          - Maximiano Valdés (born 1949) classical musician and orchestral conductor
      - Mgr. Juan Subercaseaux Errázuriz (1896–1942) Roman Catholic Archbishop
- Manuel Vicuña Larraín (1778–1843) Arzobispo de Santiago de Chile

=== Other members ===
- Manuela Caldera (c. 1803 – 1865) political activist and the First Lady of Chile during 1827; married Ramón Freire a military officer, politician, former Supreme Director of Chile and 2nd President of Chile.
  - Zenón Freire Caldera (1827–1898), politician; married Mercedes García de la Huerta Pérez
  - Liborio Ramón Freire Caldera (1829–1884), politician; married Rosario García de la Huerta Pérez
  - Francisco Freire (1839–1900), lawyer, farmer and politician; married Enriqueta Valdés Solar
- Hernán Crescente Larraín Ríos (1918–2002) lawyer and professor; married María Eliana Fernández Beraud. Great-great-great-grandson of Martín José Larraín Salas (1756–1835)
  - Hernán Larraín Fernández (1947–) lawyer and Independent Democratic Union politician; married Magdalena Matte Lecaros (1950–) engineer, businessperson and Independent Democratic Union politician; granddaughter of Arturo Matte Larraín
    - Hernán Larraín Matte (1974–) lawyer and Evópoli politician
    - Pablo Larraín (1976–) filmmaker; married Antonia Zegers
    - Juan de Dios Larraín lawyer, film and television producer

== Other notable members ==
- Fernando Eugenio Larraín Munita (1935–2011), known as Mago Larraín, illusionist, writer and actor; first marriage to Sonia De Toro; second marriage to Maria de la Luz Salas. Great-great-great-grandson of Juan Francisco Larraín Lecaros (1757–c. 1809), and great-great-great-grandson of José Toribio de Larraín y Guzmán. 1st Marquis of Larraín (1784–1829)
- Fernando Larraín (1962–) actor, comedian, singer and radio and television presenter; married Gabriela Olivares. Son of Fernando Eugenio Larraín Munita (1935–2011)
- Nicolás Larraín (1965–) radio and television presenter; married Karen Eterovic Lueg. Son of Fernando Eugenio Larraín Munita (1935–2011)
- Felipe Larraín, a Chilean economist.
- Paula Larraín, a Chilean-Danish news journalist.
- Gabriel Larraín Valdivieso, a Chilean Catholic bishop.
- Hernán Larraín, a Chilean politician.
- Joaquín Larraín Gandarillas, a Chilean priest.
- María Eugenia Larraín, a Chilean female model.
- María Larraín de Vicuña, Chilean writer, lecturer, salonnière and activist
- Nicolás Larraín, a Chilean television presenter.
- Patricia Larraín, a Chilean actress and TV hostess.
- Sara Larraín, a Chilean politician and environmentalist.
- Carlos Larraín, a Chilean lawyer and senator-designate of the far right. Staunch defender of dictatorship and constantly denying human rights violations of the military regime during the 70s and 80s. Was instrumental in getting his son, Martin, acquitted of murder charges after criminally manipulating the legal system.
- Teresa Larraín, a Chilean First Lady.
- Julita Astaburuaga Larraín, a Chilean socialite.
- Emiliano Figueroa Larraín, President of Chile in 1925-1927.
- Joaquín Figueroa Larraín, a Chilean politician.
- Juan Francisco Fresno Larraín, a Chilean cardinal.
- Arturo Matte Larraín, a Chilean lawyer and politician.
- Eliodoro Matte Larraín, President of conservative and influential think-tank Public Studies Center (Centro de Estudio Públicos, CEP).
- María Patricia Matte Larraín, President of the Primary Instruction Society, owner of several schools for poor children in Santiago.
- Claudio Orrego Larraín, a Chilean lawyer and politician.
- Ángela Prieto Larraín, a Chilean actress and model.
- María José Prieto Larraín, a Chilean actress.
- Adolfo Zaldívar Larraín, a Chilean politician and lawyer.
- Andrés Zaldívar Larraín, a Chilean Christian Democrat politician.
- Herminia Arrate Ramírez, a Chilean painter and First Lady during 1932, wife of the President Carlos Dávila Espinoza. Daughter of the Colonel Miguel Arrate Larraín.
- Alberto Hurtado Cruchaga, a Chilean Jesuit priest and lawyer. Son of Alberto Hurtado Larraín.
- Delfina Guzmán, a Chilean actress. Daughter of Florencio Guzmán Larraín.
- Samuel Maquieira Ossa, a Chilean musician, son of Diego Maquieira.
- Diego Portales Palazuelos, a Chilean minister and statesman. Son of José Santiago Portales Larraín.
