= Subercaseaux =

Chilean family of French origin

Subercaseaux Family
- Chilean business family of French origin
- Country: Chile
- Place of origin: France
- Founder: Francisco Subercaseaux Breton (c. 1730–1800)

The Subercaseaux family is a Chilean family of French descent. They became well known during the 19th century due to their wealth amassed in Norte Chico. They have played a very significant role in Chilean mining, winemaking, politics and arts.

== Main branch ==
- Francisco Subercaseaux Breton (c.1730–1800), the family patriarch and mining industry pioneer; married Bernarda Real de Azúa and Manuela Mercado Corbalán
  - Ramón Subercaseaux Mercado (1790–1859), entrepreneur and politician; married Magdalena Vicuña Aguirre (1817–1913) socialite and philanthropist
    - Lucía Subercaseaux Vicuña (1847–1908); married Claudio Vicuña Guerrero (1833–1907) politician and diplomat
      - Claudio Vicuña Subercaseaux (1875–1956) farmer and politician; married Julia Ossa Lynch
    - Victoria Subercaseaux Vicuña (1848–1931), socialite; married Benjamín Vicuña Mackenna
      - Benjamin Vicuña Subercaseaux (1876–c. 1911), writer
    - Antonio Subercaseaux Vicuña (1843–1911), merchant and politician; married Gertrudis Pérez Flores
      - Ramón Guillermo del Carmen Subercaseaux Pérez (1872–1959) politician and engineer; married Mercedes Rivas Ramírez
    - Ramón Subercaseaux Vicuña (1854–1937), painter and diplomat; married Amalia Errázuriz de Subercaseaux (née Errázuriz Urmeneta; 1860–1930), a writer, co-founder of the Chilean Ladies League and member of the Errázuriz family.
      - Pedro Subercaseaux (1880 – 1956), painter and Benedictine monk; married Elvira Lyon Otaégui (Note: Later annulled by the Pope so that both could join religious orders)
      - Luis Subercaseaux (1882–1973), athlete and politician; married Margarita Donoso Foster
      - Blanca Subercaseaux de Valdés (née Subercaseaux Errázuriz; c. 1885–c. 1887 – 1965), writer and artist; married Horacio Valdés Ortúzar
        - Francisco Valdés Subercaseaux (1908–1982), Capuchin missionary. Declared "venerable" by Pope Francis in 2014.
        - Gabriel Valdés (1919–2011) lawyer, diplomat, academic and politician; married Sylvia Soublette (1924–2020) composer, singer, choirmaster and educator
          - Juan Gabriel Valdés (born 1947) politician and diplomat: married Antonia Echenique Celis
          - Maximiano Valdés (born 1949) classical musician and orchestral conductor
      - Juan Subercaseaux (1896 – 1942), the Archbishop of La Serena.
      - Juan Subercaseaux (1896–1942), archbishop
    - Emiliana Subercaseaux de Concha (née Subercaseaux Vicuña) co-founder of Concha y Toro; married Melchor Concha y Toro (1833–1892) businessman, lawyer, politician and co-founder of Concha y Toro
      - Emiliana Concha de Ossa (née Concha Subercaseaux; 1862–1905), artist model, muse and philanthropist; married Luis Gregorio Ossa Browne
      - Carlos Concha Subercaseaux (1863–1917) lawyer and politician; married Mercedes Hurtado Lecaros
      - Daniel Concha Subercaseaux (1866–1917) civil engineer
        - Olivia de Santiago Concha, 4th Marchioness of Casa Concha (1892–1977) : married Mariano Fontecilla Varas, 4th Marquess of Montepío
          - Mariano Fontecilla de Santiago Concha, 5th Marquess of Montepío (born 1924) diplomat and lawyer; married Isabel Margarita Lira Vergara
      - Juan Enrique Concha Subercaseaux (1876–1931) lawyer, philanthropist and politician; married Josefina Subercaseaux Browne

== Other notable members ==
- Buenaventura Argandoña Subercaseaux (1804–1844), landowner and benefactor of Coquimbo Province; married Pablo Garriga Martínez and George Edwards Brown
- Carmela Mackenna Subercaseaux (1879–1962) pianist and composer
- Benjamín Subercaseaux Zañartu (1902–1973), writer and researcher.
- Juan Subercaseaux Sommerhoff (born 1943), painter
- Elizabeth Subercaseaux Sommerhoff (born 1945), journalist and writer.
