= Basque Chileans =

Vasco-chilenos; Txileko euskaldunek

Total population
- 5,300,000 (by ancestry); 27% of the Chilean population

Regions with significant populations
- Santiago, Viña del Mar, Valparaíso, Punta Arenas, Concepción, Osorno.

Languages
- Chilean Spanish, Euskera (Basque), French

Religion
- Roman Catholicism

Related ethnic groups
- Basque people, Basque diaspora, Spanish people, French people, Basque Argentine, Basque Mexican, Basque Uruguayan

Many Basques arrived in Chile in the 16th, 17th, 18th, 19th and early 20th century from their homeland in northern Spain (see Basque Provinces) and parts of southwestern France, as conquistadors, soldiers, sailors, merchants, priests and labourers. Due to their traditional hard work and entrepreneurship, many of them rose to the top of the social scale and intermarried into the Chilean elites of Castilian descent, giving birth to the new Basque-Chilean aristocracy in Chile. This union is the basis of the Chilean elite of today. But also, they immensely contributed to the ethnic make up of the bulk of the Chilean population. The Basque settlers also intermarried into the Mestizo and Castizo population of central Chile in the middle of the colonial period to form the large Criollo population that exists in Chile today; Castizos create modern middle and lower classes. Many years after the first waves of settlers, thousands of Basque refugees fleeing Spanish Civil War in 1939 also settled and have many descendants in the country and have even intermarried with Spanish ethnic groups other than Castilians, and other European ethnic groups. An estimated 1.6 million (10%) to 5 million (30%) Chileans have a surname (one or both) of Basque origin. This figure is to the least as the number of Basque descendence is great and plentiful. Due to Basque migration, Chile has a higher number of people of Basque descent than the Basque Country itself.

Miguel de Unamuno once said: "There are at least two things that clearly can be attributed to the Basques: the Society of Jesus and the Republic of Chile."

== History ==
The Basque presence in Chile began in the Conquista period, for in the armies of the first colonizers came an important number of soldiers from the Basque Provinces and from Navarra. In the 16th century, of the 157 Peninsular families that settled in Chile, 39 had Basque surnames. This number progressively grew, as reflected in the number of governors of Basque origin.

Forms a regional immigration corridor between Spain and Chile, one that is large, visible, and continues over time. Basque immigration can be divided into historical periods: discovery, foundation, and colonial period; the wave of immigration of the 18th century; and the recent immigrants (19th and 20th centuries).

During the 18th century, the country experimented a mass immigration coming from the Basque provinces and Navarre, by the end of the 18th century represents 30% of the Chilean population. This raised the Basques to being the most important regional group in the population, displacing the natives and descendants of those born in New Castile, Old Castile, and Andalucía. These immigrant families initially dedicated themselves to their preferred form of business, and in successive years produced many alliances with families of Castilian origin possessing lands and titles, giving birth to a new social group known in Chilean history as the Castilian-Basque aristocracy; others integrated with the castizo middle class.

In the second half of the 19th century came a new wave of Basque immigration, this time as much from the Spanish regions as the French. This migratory flood are extended until the end of the Spanish Civil War.

== Notable Basque-Chileans ==
A list of well known Chileans of Basque descendence is too great to name but the following shows a short list of some.

- Pedro Aguirre Cerda, President of Chile (1938–1941)
- Isabel Allende, writer
- Salvador Allende, President of Chile (1970–1973)
- Maricarmen Arrigorriaga, actress
- José Manuel Balmaceda, President of Chile (1886–1891)
- Pedro Pascal, actor
- Manuel Baquedano, Commander-in-chief of the Chilean Army during the War of the Pacific
- Juan Guzman Cruchaga (1895–1979) was a Chilean poet and diplomat. He won the Chilean National Prize for Literature in 1962
- Alberto Blest Gana, writer and diplomat
- Felipe Camiroaga, actor and TV host
- Javiera Carrera, patriot
- José Miguel Carrera, Army general, President of the Government Junta and hero of the War of Chilean Independence
- Federico Errázuriz Zañartu, President of Chile (1871–1876)
- Domingo Eyzaguirre, politician
- Lucho Gatica, Bolero singer, actor and television host of Chilean Basque descent
- Alejandro Gorostiaga, Army officer
- Alberto Hurtado Cruchaga, Jesuit priest and saint
- Marta Larraechea, former First Lady of Chile (1994–2000)
- Alberto Larraguibel, Army officer and equestrian
- Fernando Larraín, actor
- Hernán Larraín, politician
- María Eugenia Larraín, model
- Roberto Matta Echaurren, painter
- Pablo Neruda, poet and Nobel laureate
- Bernardo O'Higgins Riquelme, Army general, Supreme Director and hero of the War of Chilean Independence
- Augusto Pinochet Ugarte, Army General and military dictator (1973–1990)
- Sebastián Piñera Echenique, President of Chile (2010–2014, 2018–2022)
- Manuel Rodríguez Erdoíza, guerrilla fighter and hero of the War of Chilean Independence
- Fernando Solabarrieta, journalist and sports commentator
- Benjamín Vicuña Mackenna, politician, historian and writer
- Paz Yrarrázaval, actress
- Adolfo Zaldívar, politician
- Andrés Zaldívar, politician
- Aníbal Zañartu, politician

== Notable Basque-Chilean families ==
- Allende family
- Balmaceda family
- Carrera family
- Larraín family
- Vergara family

== See also ==
- Italian Chilean
- British Chilean
- German Chilean
