= Nicolás Solabarrieta =

Chilean footballer (born 1996)

Personal information
- Full name: Nicolás Imanol Alberto Solabarrieta Vergara
- Date of birth: 24 August 1996 (age 30)
- Place of birth: Vitacura, Chile
- Height: 1.85 m (6 ft 1 in)
- Position: Forward

Youth career
- 2012–2015: Universidad Católica

College career
Years	Team	Apps	(Gls)
2015–2018	Albany Great Danes	78	(25)

Senior career*
Years	Team	Apps	(Gls)
2016	Long Island Rough Riders	5	(1)
2017	FC Tucson	8	(0)
2018	Reading United	7	(2)
2019	Tacuarembó	5	(0)
2020–2021	Palestino	5	(0)
2021	Deportes Recoleta	12	(0)
2022	Lautaro de Buin	10	(1)
2023	Seravezza Pozzi	6	(0)
Total		58	(4)
- * Club domestic league appearances and goals

Nicolás Imanol Alberto Solabarrieta Vergara (born Nicolás Alberto Kozak Vergara; 24 August 1996) is a Chilean former professional footballer who played as a forward.

== Career ==
Solabarrieta played college soccer for the University at Albany after failing to make an appearance for Chilean top flight side Club Deportivo Universidad Católica. While playing for the University at Albany, he also played for the Long Island Rough Riders, Tucson, as well as Reading United AC in the American fourth division.

For 2019, he signed for Uruguayan second division outfit Tacuarembó.

For 2020, Solabarrieta signed for Palestino in the Chilean top flight. On secolnd half 2021, he joined Chilean Segunda División side Deportes Recoleta.

In 2023, he joined ASD Seravezza Pozzi in the Italian Serie D.

In September 2023, he announced his retirement from football.

== Personal life ==
He is the son of the Chilean sports journalist Fernando Solabarrieta the journalist and TV host Ivette Vergara. From his paternal line, he is of Basque descent since his grandfather is Spanish and of Syrian origin on his grandmother's side.

== TV career ==
Following his early retirement from football, he began participating in Chilean reality show Tierra Brava (Wild Land) from Canal 13.

In 2025, Solabarrieta had a stint as a panelist for the late-night talk show Noche de Suerte (Lucky Night) from TV+. In January 2026, he and his mother, Ivette Vergara, started the talk show ¿Quién Manda Aquí? (Who's in Charge Here?) from the same channel.

In February 2026, Solabarrieta joined the dance TV show Fiebre de Baile (Dance Fever) from Chilevisión.
