= Emiliana Concha de Ossa =

Chilean art model (1862–1905)

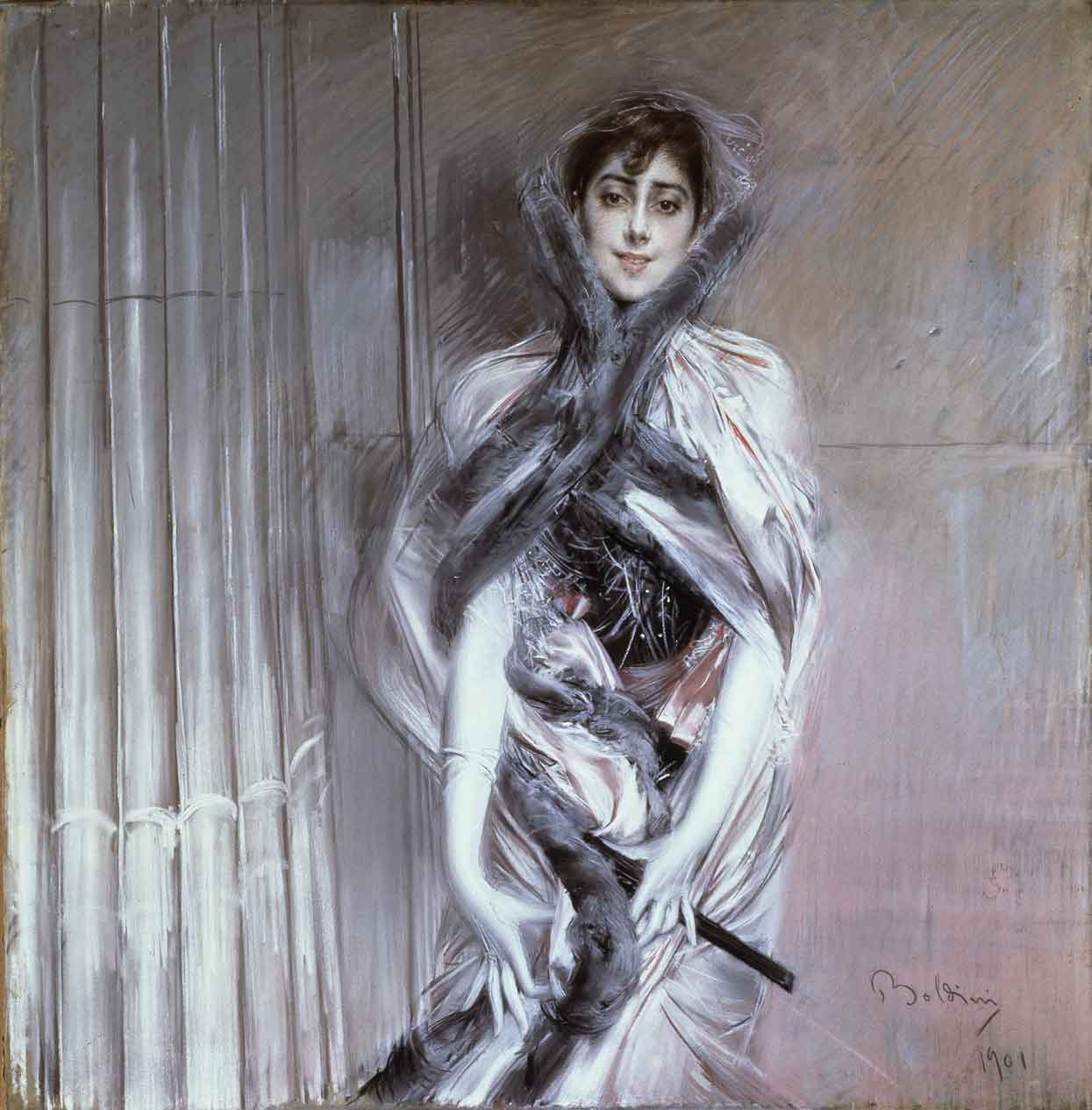
- Giovanni Boldini (1901) Portrait of Emiliana Concha de Ossa
- Born: Emiliana Concha Subercaseaux; 21 February 1862; Valparaíso, Chile
- Died: 15 October 1905 (aged 43); Lausanne, Switzerland
- Occupations: Artist model; muse; philanthropist
- Spouse: Luis Gregorio Ossa Browne (m. 1889)
- Father: Melchor Concha y Toro
- Relatives: Olivia de Santiago Concha, 4th Marchioness of Casa Concha (niece); Ramón Subercaseaux Vicuña (uncle)
- Family: Subercaseaux family

Emiliana Concha de Ossa (née Concha Subercaseaux; 21 February 1862 – 15 October 1905) was a Chilean artist model, muse, philanthropist and member of the Chilean aristocracy.

== Biography ==
Emiliana Concha Subercaseaux was born to Melchor Concha y Toro and Emiliana Subercaseaux Vicuña, the founders of Concha y Toro, on 21 February 1862 in Valparaíso. Through her mother Concha was the niece of Ramón Subercaseaux Vicuña and a member of the Subercaseaux family. Concha was the paternal granddaughter of Melchor de Santiago Concha y Cerda.

One of six siblings, Concha was the sister of Juan Enrique Concha Subercaseaux and Carlos Concha Subercaseaux.

== Career ==
In Paris, Ossa was an artist model and muse of Giovanni Boldini.

In October 1894, Concha co-founded the Sociedad Protectora de la Infancia (English: Child Protection Society) in Santiago.

== Personal life ==
On 8 July 1889, Concha married Luis Gregorio Ossa Browne in Recoleta.

Concha was the aunt of Olivia de Santiago Concha, 4th Marchioness of Casa Concha through her brother Daniel Concha Subercaseaux, and was the sister-in-law of Joaquín Prieto Hurtado through her sister Lucía Concha Subercaseaux,

On 15 October 1905, Concha died in Lausanne, Switzerland.

== Gallery ==
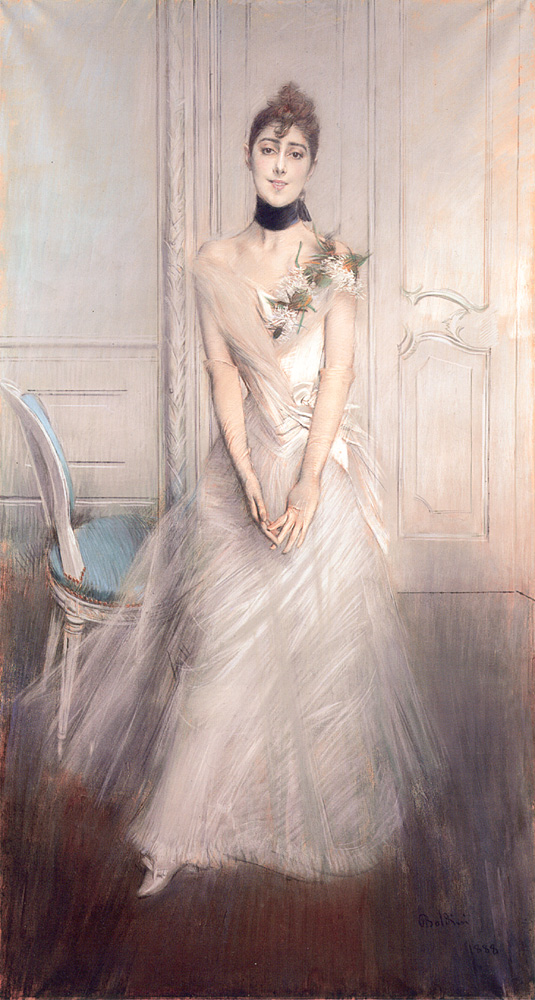
Giovanni Boldini (1888) Il Pastello Bianco (Ritratto di Emiliana Concha de Ossa)

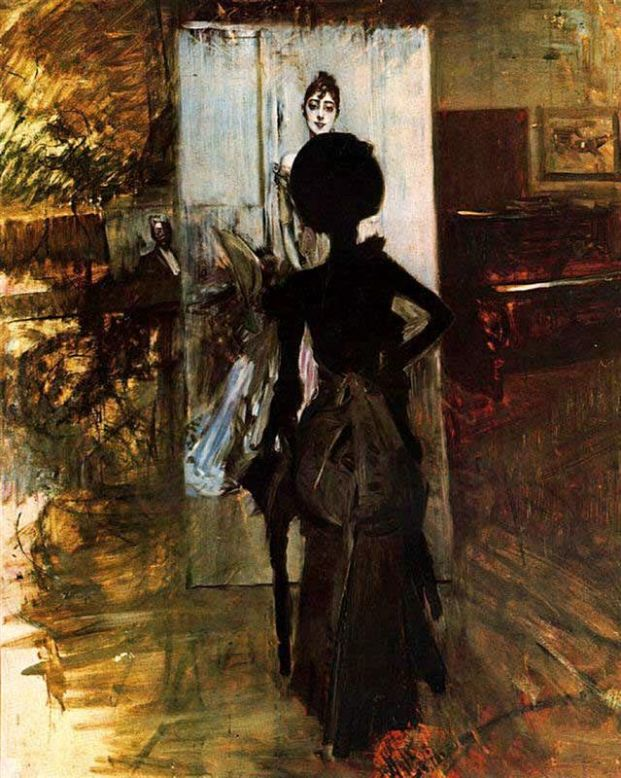
Giovanni Boldini (c. 1888) Donna in nero che guarda il “Pastello della signora Emiliana Concha de Ossa”

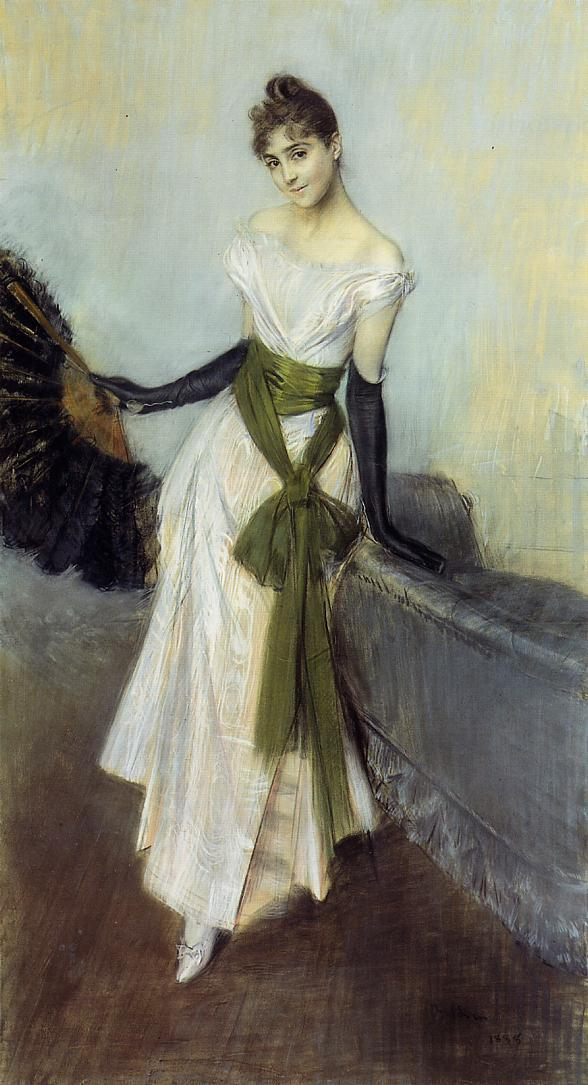
Giovanni Boldini (1888) Signorina Concha de Ossa
