= Andrea Molina =

Chilean actress, businesswoman, and politician

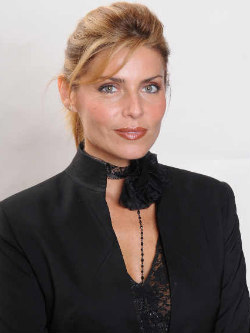
- Molina in 2010

Member of the Chamber of Deputies
- In office 11 March 2010 – 11 March 2018
- Preceded by: Alfonso Vargas
- Succeeded by: (district dissolved)
- Constituency: District No. 10

Personal details
- Born: Andrea Molina Oliva; 28 March 1970 (age 56) Santiago, Chile
- Party: Independent Democratic Union (2010–2018); Chile Vamos (2021–present)
- Spouses: Gerald Kleinfercher (m. 1989; div. 2003) Gonzalo Rojas Vildósola (m. 2005, divorced)
- Children: 2
- Occupation: Actress, businesswoman, politician

Andrea Molina Oliva (born 28 March 1970) is a Chilean actress, businesswoman, and politician. Early in her acting career, she gained popularity for her starring role in Las historias de Sussi, a TV series adapted from the film Sussi. She later appeared on the service program Hola Andrea and Mujer, rompe el silencio, a program that dealt with cases of gender violence.

She served as a member of the Chamber of Deputies of Chile for two consecutive terms, from 2010 to 2018.

== Early life and education ==
Andrea Molina was born in Santiago on 28 March 1970, the daughter of a visual arts professor and a hair and color analyst at the Wella Laboratory. She completed her basic level studies at the Swiss Confederation municipal school, and then received a scholarship from the Swiss School in Santiago. For her intermediate level studies, she attended Liceo 7 de niñas. Later, she studied bilingual secretarial work at the Instituto Chileno Norteamericano.

In 1992, she made her debut as a model on the television shows Miss TV, Todo por la plata, and Jeep Fun Race on La Red. Subsequently, she joined Televisión Nacional de Chile (TVN) as a model on the entertainment program Motín a bordo.

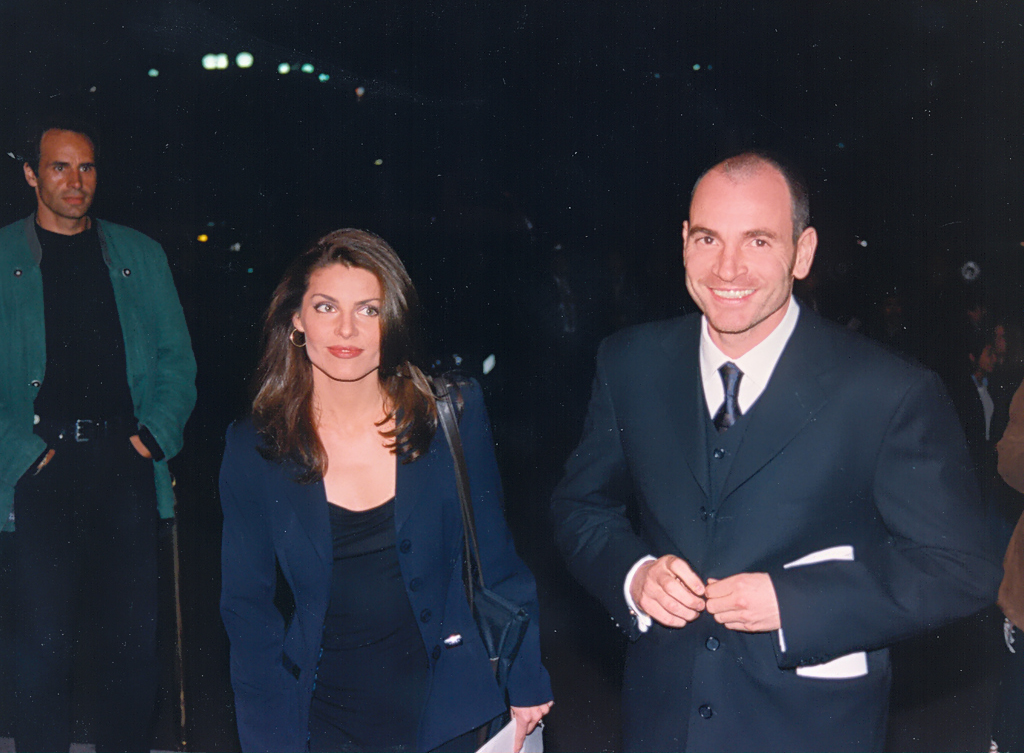
Molina with Álvaro Rudolphy in 1998

In 1996, Molina made her debut as an actress in the telenovela Sucupira, and later appeared on the series La buhardilla. She also took over as host of the children's program Hugo, replacing Ivette Vergara. The following year, she starred in the series Las historias de Sussi. She went on to co-host La noche del Mundial and Corazón partío, also on TVN.

Later she was hired by Mega as a news anchor on Meganoticias Matinal. On the same channel, she hosted the service program Hola Andrea, which aired for six years, and the series Mujer, rompe el silencio. In addition, she made a special appearance on the sitcom Mandiola y Compañía. She performed educational and solidarity work for various social campaigns, including the Teletón. In 2001, she received an APES Award as Best Entertainer from the Association of Show Business Journalists. She did not renew her contract with Mega when it expired in December 2008.

In parallel to her work on television, she hosted the program Sexto sentido on Radio Romance. After taking an interest in aromatherapy, she opened the store Bella Vida in 2007.

== Political career ==
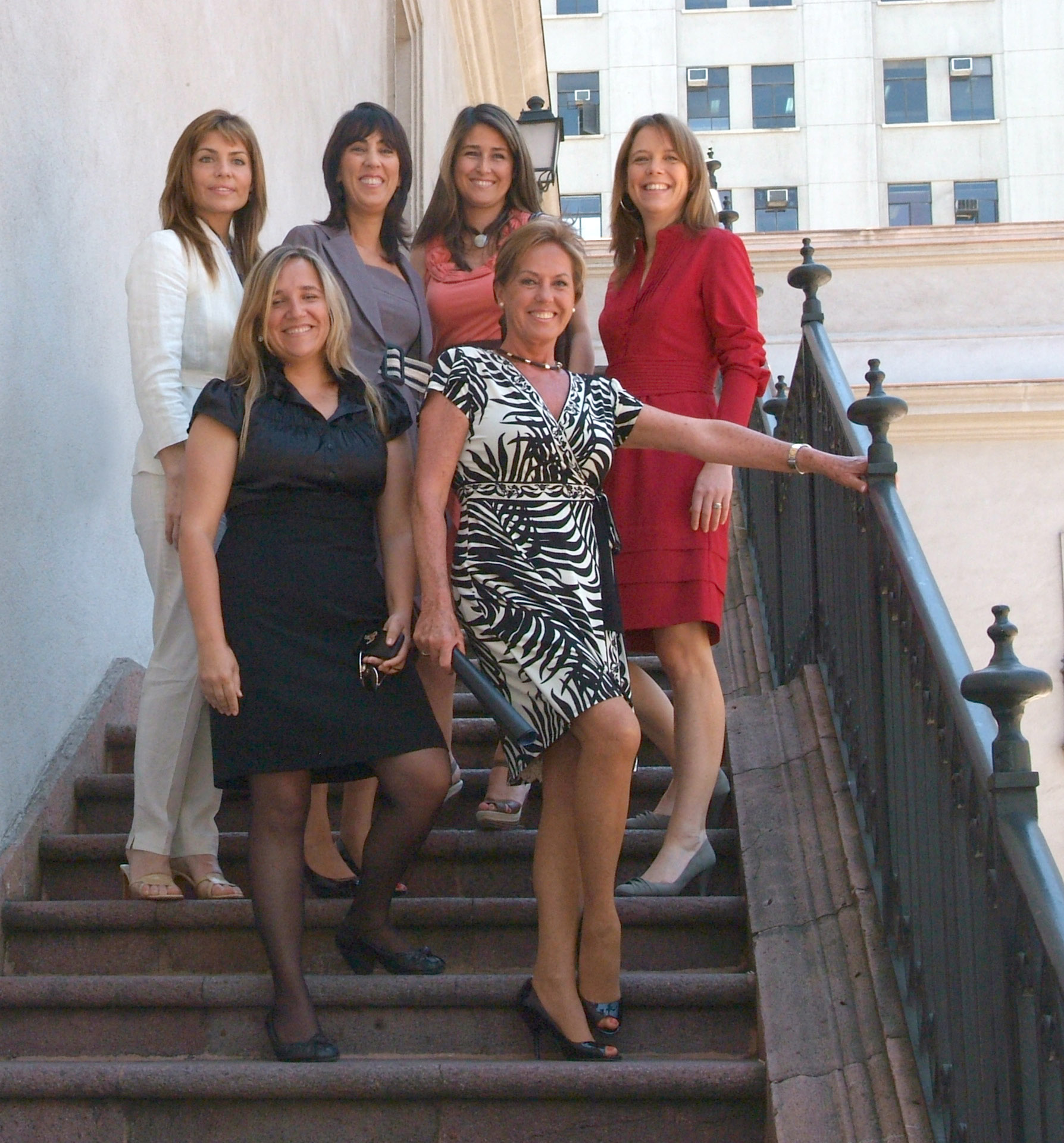
Molina (in white) with Alliance parliamentarians in 2010

In December 2009, Molina was elected as an independent member of the Chamber of Deputies for the 2010–2014 legislative term for District No. 10, Valparaíso Region, corresponding to the communes of Cabildo, Hijuelas, La Calera, La Cruz, La Ligua, Nogales, Papudo, Petorca, Puchuncaví, Quillota, Quintero, and Zapallar.

On 3 January 2010, she formally joined the Independent Democratic Union (UDI), which had supported her candidacy. She was a member of the permanent government commissions for Foreign Relations, Inter-Parliamentary Affairs and Latin American Integration, Culture and the Arts, and Natural Resources. She was also part of the UDI parliamentary committee. In June 2013, she was proclaimed a "social spokesperson" for Pablo Longueira's presidential candidacy.

She was reelected deputy for the UDI for the term 2014–2018. On 6 May 2014, she became part of the Special Investigative Commission on complaints of possible fraud and other irregularities in the Regional Government of Valparaíso.

On 2 April 2015, she was a member of the Special Investigative Commission on the actions of public bodies responsible for the protection of health and the environment in Antofagasta.

On 13 January 2016, she was a member of the Special Investigative Commission of irregularities that occurred in the National Board of School Aid and Scholarships (JUNAEB) during 2014 and 2015. On 19 January of the same year, she joined the Special Investigative Commission on the performance of public bodies in the environmental evaluation process of the Cardones-Polpaico project, as well as the Doña Alicia hydroelectric power project in Curacautín.

On 6 September 2017, Molina was one of at least 40 parliamentarians identified by journalists as having commissioned advisory reports with paragraphs copied verbatim from websites or books, without giving credit to the original authors.

=== Political comeback ===
For the 2021 municipal elections, Chile Vamos announced Andrea Molina as its official candidate for mayor of Viña del Mar. National Renewal expressed support for her candidacy. In the elections, which were held in May 2021, Molina was defeated by Democratic Revolution candidate Macarena Ripamonti.

== Personal life ==
Molina married Gerald Kleinfercher at age 18, and had her first daughter with him. They divorced in 2003.

She married Gonzalo Rojas Vildósola in 2005, with whom she had her second daughter. They separated in 2012, and later divorced.

On 1 July 2010, Molina suffered a serious auto accident on Avenida Santos Ossa in Valparaíso. She escaped without major injuries.

On 16 September 2012, she was involved in another accident in the Quebradilla sector of La Ligua commune, when a taxi hit the truck in which she was traveling with her daughters. She again ended up with minor injuries and was released hours later.

== Television roles ==
- Miss TV (1992, La Red)
- Todo por la Plata (La Red)
- Jeep Fun Race (La Red)
- Motín a Bordo (TVN)
- La buhardilla (1996, TVN) – Débora del Valle
- Sucupira (1996, TVN) – Luna del Alba
- Hugo (TVN) – replacement host
- Las historias de Sussi (1997, TVN) – Sussi
- Sucupira, la comedia (1998–1999, TVN) – Luna del Alba
- La Noche del Mundial (1998, TVN) – co-presenter
- Corazón partío (1999–2000, TVN) – herself
- Hola Andrea (2001–2006, Mega) – host
- Mujer, rompe el silencio (2003–2004, Mega) – host
- Meganoticias Matinal (2007, Mega) – anchor, together with José Luis Repenning
- Mandiola y Compañia (2008, Mega) – Bruna Edwards (special appearance)
