= Astaburuaga =

Astaburuaga, sometimes spelled Asta-Buruaga, is a surname. Notable people with the surname include:

- Francisco Solano Astaburuaga y Cienfuegos (1817–1892), Chilean politician and lawyer
- Julita Astaburuaga (1919–2016), Chilean socialite
- Luis Osvaldo Escobar Astaburuaga (1915–2010), Chilean surgeon and politician
- Mario Astaburuaga (1904–1951), Chilean swimmer
- Paulina Saball Astaburuaga (born 1952), Chilean politician and social worker
- René Amengual Astaburuaga (1911–1954), Chilean composer, educator, and pianist
- Tomás Asta-Buruaga (born 1996), Chilean footballer
