= José Antonio Gandarillas =

Chilean lawyer and politician

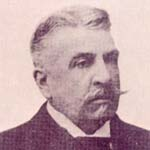

President of the Senate of Chile
- In office 15 November 1892 – 16 January 1893
- Preceded by: Waldo Silva
- Succeeded by: Vicente Reyes

Minister of Justice, Worship and Public Instruction
- In office 1879–1880
- President: Aníbal Pinto
- Preceded by: Jorge Huneeus Zegers
- Succeeded by: Manuel García de la Huerta

Minister of Finance
- In office 1870–1871
- President: José Joaquín Pérez
- Preceded by: Melchor de Concha y Toro
- Succeeded by: Camilo Cobo

Personal details
- Born: 1839 Santiago de Chile
- Died: 9 February 1913 (aged 73–74) Santiago de Chile
- Party: Liberal; Liberal Democratic
- Spouse: Rosa Huici Arguedas
- Children: José Antonio Gandarillas Huici; Carmen Gandarillas Huici
- Parent(s): José Santiago Gandarillas Guzmán; María del Carmen Luco Huici
- Education: College of the Sacred Hearts of Santiago; Instituto Nacional General José Miguel Carrera; University of Chile

José Antonio Gandarillas Luco (1839 – 9 February 1913) was a Chilean lawyer and Liberal politician.

== Early life ==
Gandarillas was born in Santiago de Chile in 1839. He was the son of José Santiago Gandarillas Guzmán and María del Carmen Luco Huici.

His paternal grandparents were Santiago Gandarillas Romero and María del Carmen Guzmán Ibáñez. His uncle was Senator Manuel José Gandarillas Guzmán, who served as Ministry of Government and Foreign Affairs under Ramón Freire, the first President of Chile.

He was educated at the College of the Sacred Hearts of Santiago between 1849 and 1852, and at the National Institute beginning in 1851. He then graduated as a lawyer from the University of Chile in 1861.

== Career ==
In 1863, he became rapporteur of the Court of Appeals of Santiago before becoming a Commercial Judge of Santiago in 1869 and an Alternate Minister of the Court of Appeals of Santiago in 1875, which he resigned from in 1882. From 1869 to 1895, he was part of the drafting commissions of the penal code and the code of civil procedures.

From 1866 to 1867, he served as Mayor of the Maule. Under José Joaquín Pérez, a National and the 6th President of Chile, Gandarillas served as the Minister of Finance.

Under the Aníbal Pinto, a Liberal and the 8th President of Chile, Gandarillas served as the Minister of Justice, Worship and Public Instruction.

=== Parliamentarian career ===
As a member of the Liberal Party, he was a Deputy for Santiago in four consecutive terms from 1876 to 1888 and for Ovalle, Combarbalá and Illapel from 1888 to 1891. During this period, he was a member of the permanent commissions of Government and Foreign Relations; Constitution, Legislation and Justice; Finance and Industries and Worship and Colonization.

In 1886, he was unsuccessfully nominated for the Presidency of the Republic, along with José Manuel Balmaceda. Gandarillas left the liberal ruling party for the military in the Liberal Democratic Party in 1891 after the fall of President José Manuel Balmaceda, who was part of the Castilian-Basque aristocracy in Chile and whom he defended. He served as a Senator for Santiago from 1891 to 1897, and for Talca from 1897 to 1903. He was a member of the permanent commissions of Government and Foreign Relations.

He served as the Vice President of the Senate from 10 August 1892 to 15 November 1892 and President of the Senate from 15 November 1892 to 16 January 1893. He spent his last years in Europe and before returning to Chile where he dies in 1913.

== Personal life ==
Gandarillas was married to Rosa Huici Arguedas, one of thirteen children born to Ildefonso Huici y Peón, a silver magnate who had fled civil war and moved his family to their estates in La Calera, Chile, then a village in the banks of the Aconcagua river, some sixty kilometers (about forty miles) northeast of Valparaíso. Her mother was Manuela Arguedas. Among her siblings were two sisters, Eugenia (who married painter José Tomás Errázuriz) and Ana, and a brother, José. Together, they were the parents of:

- José Antonio "Tony" Gandarillas Huici (1885–1970), also a diplomat who married Juana Edwards Mac-Clure, a daughter of the President of the Senate of Chile Agustín Edwards Ross; a bisexual, he was also the partner of painter Christopher Wood.
- Carmen Gandarillas Huici (b. c. 1887), who did not marry.

Gandarillas died in Santiago on 9 February 1913.

=== Descendants ===
Through his son, he was the grandfather of Marie Rose Gandarillas Edwards (1912–1995), who married Carlos Eastman Beéche, Juana Carlota Victoria Gandarillas Edwards (1916–2005), and Carmen Gandarillas Edwards (1914–1985), who was engaged to George Harcourt Vanden-Bampde-Johnstone, 3rd Baron Derwent, shortly before his death in 1949; she later married Thomas Alexander Scott.

Political offices
Preceded by Melchor de Concha y Toro	Minister of Finance; 1870–1871	Succeeded by Camilo Cobo
Preceded by Jorge Huneeus Zegers	Minister of Justice, Worship and Public Instruction; 1879–1880	Succeeded by Manuel García de la Huerta
