= Pedro Vicuña =

Pedro Vicuña may refer to:

- Pedro Félix Vicuña (1805–1874), Chilean newspaperman (El Mercurio) and politician
- Pedro Vicuña Novoa (1872–?), Chilean lawyer and politician
- Pedro Vicuña (actor) (born 1956), Chilean poet and actor
