= María Larraín de Vicuña =

Chilean feminist writer, lecturer, salonnière and activist (died 1928)

- Born: María Larraín Prieto
- Died: 23 September 1928; Santiago, Chile
- Occupations: Writer; lecturer; salonnière; activist
- Spouse: Alfredo Vicuña Correa
- Children: 4
- Relatives: Carlos Rozas Larraín (nephew)
- Family: Larraín family
- Writing career
- Pen name: Miriam
- Language: Spanish
- Literary movement: Feminism

María Larraín de Vicuña (née María Larraín Prieto; died 23 September 1928) was a Chilean writer, lecturer, salonnière and activist in the early Chilean feminist movement of the early twentieth century.

== Early life and family ==
María Larraín Prieto was born to José Nicolás Larraín Larraín and María Mercedes Prieto Hurtado. Through her father, Larraín was a member of the Larraín family. One of eight children, Vicuña was the aunt of Carlos Rozas Larraín.

Larraín was married to Alfredo Vicuña Correa, with whom she had four children. Larraín and Vicuña were the godparents of Mons José Armando Gutiérrez Granier.

== Career ==
Based in the city of Antofagasta, Larraín was also active in the Chilean capital where she gave lectures to intellectual circles. Larraín was leader and proponent of Catholic Feminism in Chile, and was a member of the Chilean Ladies League and the Association of Catholic Women's Youth. A staunch Catholic, Larraín was opposed to the secularization of Chilean society and was a benefactor and member of the "Academia de Bellas Letras" at the Pontifical Catholic University of Chile.

During her lifetime Larraín wrote newspaper articles, held Salons and gave lectures on Catholic Feminism, and was associated with Inés Echeverría and Amalia Errázuriz de Subercaseaux. Larraín also wrote under the pen name "Miriam", under which she was more free with her opinions. Following her death on 23 September 1928 in Santiago, her husband posthumous published and edited a collection of her writing and speeches made between 1919 and 1928.

Larraín is considered by Gabriel Salazar and Julio Pinto to have been the "queen of the provincial salon". Salazar further assets that Larraín was one of the most recognized voices of the elite of her time, and that she “went furthest in reflecting on what the social and historical role of women should be at the beginning of the 20th century”.

== Bibliography ==
- Larraín de Vicuña, María (1928). Vicuña Correa, Alfredo (ed.). María Larraín de Vicuña (in Spanish). Santiago.
