= Amalia Larraín y Vicuña =

Chilean

- Born: 16 June 1832; Santiago, Chile
- Died: 14 July 1928 (aged 96); Santiago, Chile
- Other name: Amalia Larraín de Armstrong
- Education: Conservatorio Nacional de Música
- Occupation: Composer
- Spouse: Diego Armstrong y Gana (m. 1872; died 1910)
- Children: 3
- Family: Larraín family; Vicuña family

Amalia Larraín y Vicuña (married name Amalia Larraín de Armstrong; 16 June 1832 – 14 July 1928) was a Chilean composer, socialite and philanthropist.

== Biography ==
Larraín was born on 16 June 1832 in Santiago to Vicente de Larraín y Aguirre and María de las Mercedes Vicuña. A member of the Larraín and Vicuña family, Larraín was the third of nine siblings.

In 1851, Larraín enrolled at the Conservatorio Nacional de Música. Only two of Larraín's compositions are known, Ave Maria (c. 1871) for voice and piano and Las doce del día (1922). Larraín's 1922 composition was based on the work of Guillermo Matta, and was created to benefit the victims of the Vallenar earthquake.

In 1872, Larraín co-founded the Hospital del Salvador. The same year Larraín married Diego Armstrong y Gana (1842–1910), a lawyer and member of the Chamber of Deputies of Chile, on 22 April 1872. Larraín and Armstrong had three children.

On 14 July 1928 Larraín died in Santiago, aged 96.
