= Vicuña family =

Chilean political family

Vicuña family Familia Vicuña
- Chilean political family
- Country: Chile
- Connected families: Larraín family

The Vicuña family (Spanish: Familia Vicuña) is a Chilean aristocratic family, active in politics since the 18th century. The Vicuña Larraín branch are members of the Los Ochocientos (The 800s) branch of the Larraín family.

== Members ==
- Santiago de Larraín y Vicuña (1666–1748), knight of the Order of Santiago, president of the Royal Audiencia of Quito and founder of Los Marqueses
- Francisco Ramón de Vicuña Larraín (1775–1849), farmer, politician, and twice Vice President of Chile; married Mariana de Aguirre y Boza (baptised 1775), twice Vice First Lady of Chile
- Manuel Vicuña y Larraín (1777–1843), first Archbishop of Santiago de Chile
- José Joaquín Vicuña Larraín (1786–1857), Colonel and politician
- Pedro Félix Vicuña Aguirre (1805–1874), politician, journalist and media proprietor
- Félix Mackenna Vicuña (1823–1901), military officer and politician
- Benjamín Vicuña Mackenna (1831–1886), lawyer, writer, historian and journalist
- Claudio Vicuña Guerrero (1833–1907), politician
- Benjamín Vicuña Solar (1837–1897), politician, poet and journalist
- Amalia Larraín y Vicuña (1832–1928), composer, socialite and philanthropist
- Carlos Morla Vicuña (1846–1900), politician, diplomat and journalist.
- Antonio Íñiguez Vicuña (1848–1908), writer, historian and politician
- Santiago Marín Vicuña (1871–1936), engineer
- Carlos Vicuña Fuentes (1886–1977), writer, lawyer, teacher and politician
- Carmen Morla Lynch (1887–1983), writer and medium
- Carlos Morla Lynch (c. 1888–1969), writer and diplomat
- Ximena Morla Lynch (1891–1987), writer, medium and painter
- Juan Casanova Vicuña (1894–1976), composer and conductor
- José Ignacio Palma Vicuña (1910–1988), civil engineer and politician
- Eladio Vicuña Aránguiz (1911–2008) Catholic prelate
- Tomás Reyes Vicuña (1914–1986), architect and politician
- José Miguel Vicuña Lagarrigue (1920–2007), poet, writer and librarian; married Eliana Navarro (1920–2006), poet and librarian
- Rosa Vicuña Lagarrigue (1925–2010), sculptor and educator
- Teresa Vicuña Lagarrigue (1927– 2019), sculptor and educator
- Francisco Orrego Vicuña (1942–2018), lawyer, academic and diplomat
- Cecilia Vicuña (born 1948), poet and artist
- Leonora Vicuña Navarro (born 1952), photographer, film editor and educator
- Benjamín Vicuña Luco (born 1978), actor and entrepreneur
