= Fernando Solabarrieta =

Chilean television journalist (born 1970)

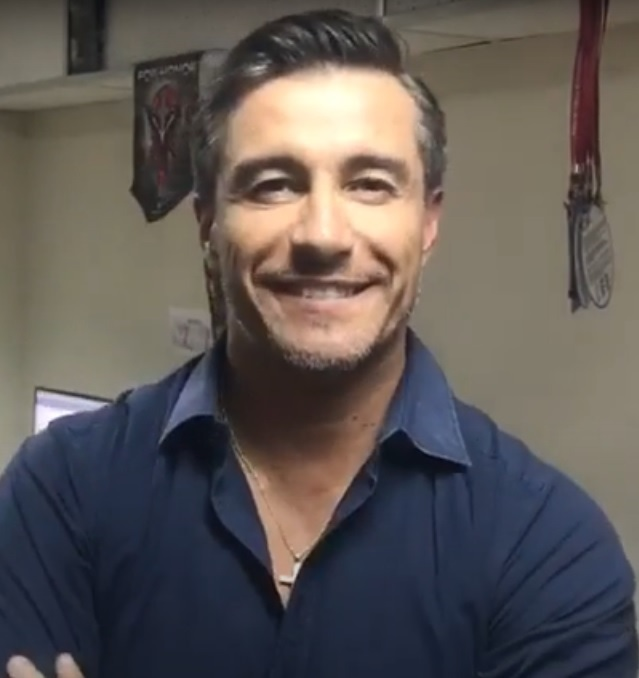
- Born: Fernando Javier Solabarrieta Chelech; December 18, 1970 (age 55); Puerto Natales, Chile
- Occupations: Journalist, TV presenter
- Spouse: Ivette Vergara (2001–present)

Fernando Javier Solabarrieta Chelech (born December 18, 1970, in Puerto Natales, Chile) is a Chilean television journalist, known for his role as anchor man on several sport events for TVN, like "Zoom Deportivo". He is of Basque descent since his father is Spanish and of Arab (Palestinian) origin on his mother's side. He is married to journalist and TV host Ivette Vergara and they have three children: Nicolás, Iñaki and Maite.

On 2011 he started working as anchor man for Fox Sports (cable TV station), which is also his current job. In March 2015, he left TVN after serving for 22 years.

On August 6, 2015, he joined Mega to his sports channel area to tell the parties of the Chilean national team in the World Cup Qualifying course Russia 2018.

== Filmography ==
=== TV shows ===
- Zoom Deportivo (2008–present)
- Había Una Vez (2011)
- Levantando la Copa (2011)
