= Adela Edwards Salas =

Chilean teacher and philanthropist (1874–1939)

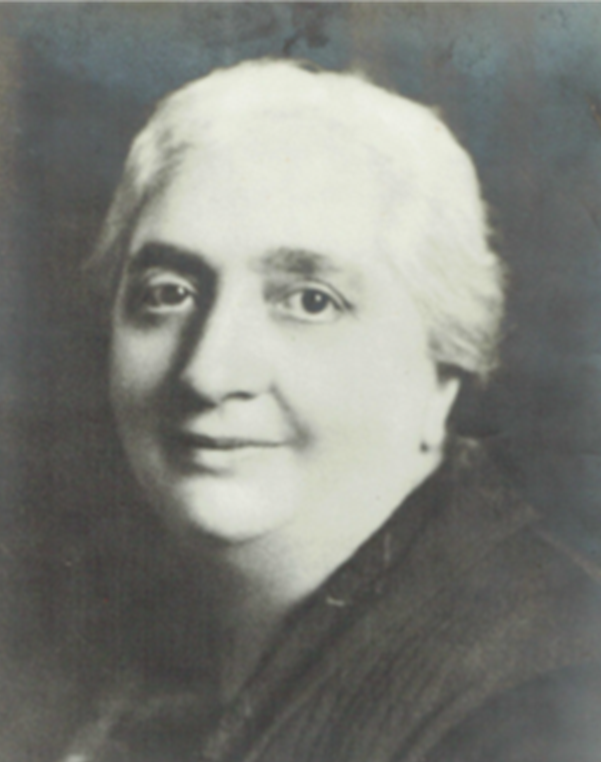
- Born: 16 March 1874; Santiago, Chile
- Died: 11 November 1939 (aged 65); Santiago, Chile
- Occupations: Teacher; philanthropist
- Relatives: Rafael Edwards Salas
- Family: Edwards family

Signature
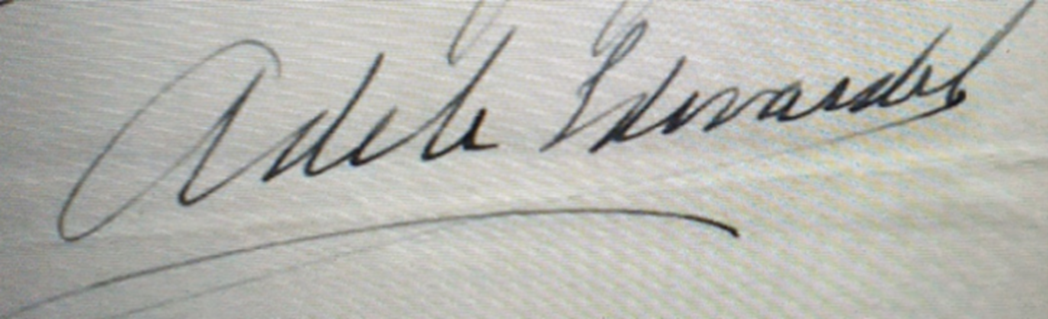

Adela Edwards Salas (16 March 1874 – 11 November 1939) was a Chilean teacher and philanthropist.

== Biography ==
Edwards was born 16 March 1874 in Santiago to Eduardo Edwards Garriga and Javiera Salas Errázuriz. Edwards was the sister of Rafael Edwards Salas, and was a member of the Edwards family.

On 20 March 1907, Edwards founded the Santa Teresa Normal School (Spanish: Escuela Normal Santa Teresa) in Santiago.

In 1912, Edwards co-founded the Chilean Ladies League with Amalia Errázuriz de Subercaseaux.

In 1918, Edwards founded The White Cross (Spanish: La Cruz Blanca) an organization which cared for abandoned girls.
