= Liberal Democratic Party (Chile, 1875) =

Liberal Democratic Party Partido Liberal Democrático
- Founder: Benjamín Vicuña Mackenna
- Founded: 1875
- Dissolved: 1886
- Split from: Liberal Party
- Headquarters: Santiago, Chile
- Ideology: Liberalism

The Liberal Democratic Party (Spanish: Partido Liberal Democrático) was a Chilean political party, which took formal existence in 1876, created to support the presidential candidacy of Benjamín Vicuña Mackenna.
