= Melchor Concha y Toro =

Chilean businessman, lawyer and politician

Melchor de Concha y Toro
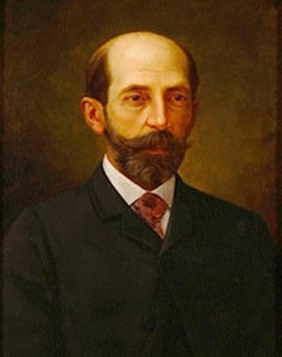

Senator for Santiago
- In office 1885–1891

Minister of Finance
- In office 7 January 1869 – 2 August 1870
- President: José Joaquín Pérez
- Preceded by: Alejandro Reyes
- Succeeded by: José Antonio Gandarillas

Personal details
- Born: 10 October 1833 Santiago, Chile
- Died: 21 July 1892 (aged 58) Santiago, Chile
- Spouse: Emiliana Subercaseaux de Concha
- Children: 6 including, Emiliana Concha de Ossa
- Relatives: Mateo de Toro Zambrano (grandfather); Olivia de Santiago Concha, 4th Marchioness of Casa Concha (granddaughter)
- Education: University of Chile, 1857

Melchor de Santiago-Concha y Toro, known as Melchor Concha y Toro (10 October 1833 – 21 June 1892) was a Chilean businessman, lawyer, politician and co-founder of Concha y Toro.

== Early life ==
Melchor de Santiago-Concha y Toro was born 10 October 1833 in Santiago to Melchor de Santiago Concha y Cerda and Damiana de Toro Guzmán. Through his mother Concha was the grandson of Mateo de Toro Zambrano.

Concha studied at the Instituto Nacional (National Institute) and at the faculty of law of the University of Chile, receiving his law degree on 17 January 1857. When he entered the University of Chile Faculty of Law, he presented a historical book commended by the university titled Chile during the years 1824 through 1828

== Politics ==
Between 1861 and 1871 he belonged to the Conservative Party, but soon became a moderate liberal.

He entered politics in 1864 after being elected representative of Melipilla. He was reelected as representative until 1886, when he was elected to the Senate representing Santiago. In 1869 he was nominated Minister of Finance by Chilean President José Joaquín Pérez, until 2 August 1870. In 1891 he resigned his post in support of the congressional side of the 1891 Chilean Civil War against then president José Manuel Balmaceda.

== Business career ==
His passion being business, he became the manager of Banco Garantizador.

In 1879 he was president of the Bolivian Huanchaca Company.

=== Concha y Toro Winery ===
In 1883, the Marquis Melchor de Concha y Toro entered the wine-making industry by deciding to plant grapevines in the Maipo River valley. He brought seeds to Chile from the Bordeaux region of France and hired a French ethnologist Monsieur Labouchere. From this personal project, the Concha y Toro winery was born.

== Personal life ==
Concha married Emiliana Subercaseaux Vicuña (known as Emiliana Subercaseaux de Concha), a member of the Subercaseaux family. Concha and Subercaseaux had six children including Emiliana Concha de Ossa, Juan Enrique Concha Subercaseaux and Carlos Concha Subercaseaux.

He constructed a mansion in 1875 in Pirque. The mansion stands out by its extensive gardens and its rural Chilean style as well as some French touches.

He died in Santiago on 21 June 1892. His granddaughter, Olivia de Santiago Concha, 4th Marchioness of Casa Concha, reclaimed the family nobility titles of marquess of Casa Concha and Rocafuerte.

Political offices
Preceded by Alejandro Reyes	Minister of Finance; 1869–1870	Succeeded by José Antonio Gandarillas
