= Alejandro Reyes (politician) =

Chilean lawyer and politician

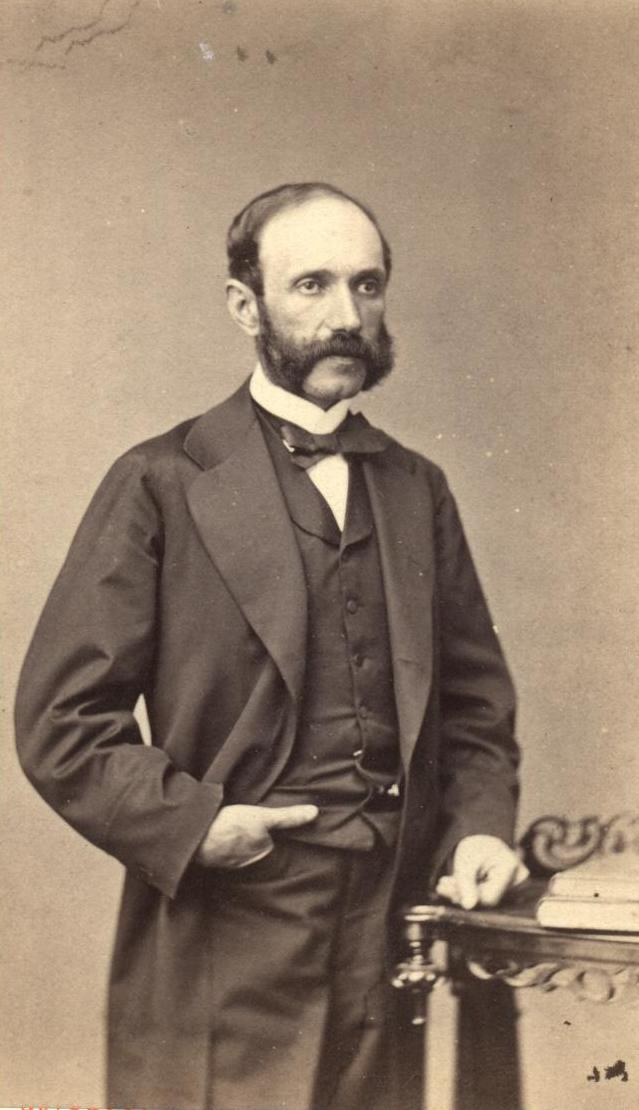

President of the Supreme Court
- In office 1882
- Preceded by: José Miguel Barriga Castro
- Succeeded by: Álvaro Covarrubias Ortúzar

Justice of the Supreme Court of Chile
- In office 1870–1883

Senator
- In office 1870–1882
- Preceded by: José Alejo Valenzuela Díaz
- Succeeded by: Elías Fernández Albano
- Constituency: Curicó

Minister of Foreign Affairs
- In office 1868–1870
- Preceded by: Miguel Luis Amunátegui
- Succeeded by: Belisario Prats

Minister of the Interior
- In office 1868–1870
- Preceded by: Miguel Luis Amunátegui
- Succeeded by: Belisario Prats

Minister of Finance
- In office 1864–1869
- Preceded by: Domingo Santa María
- Succeeded by: Melchor Concha y Toro

Deputy
- In office 1864–1867
- Preceded by: Andrés Chacón Barry
- Succeeded by: Nicolás Figueroa Brito
- Constituency: Itata
- In office 1858–1861
- Preceded by: Miguel Barros Morán
- Succeeded by: Manuel Briceño Ibáñez
- Constituency: Melipilla and La Victoria
- In office 1855–1858
- Preceded by: José Bisquert de la Barrera
- Succeeded by: Ignacio Errázuriz Salas
- Constituency: San Fernando
- In office 1852–1855
- Preceded by: Juan Bello Dunn
- Succeeded by: Nicanor Letelier Cruz
- Constituency: Los Angeles and Yungay

Personal details
- Born: Alejandro Matías Luis Ignacio Reyes Cotapos; February 24, 1825 Santiago, Chile
- Died: January 8, 1884 (aged 58) Santiago, Chile
- Party: National
- Spouse(s): Hortensia Lavalle Correas; Fanny Ovalle Vicuña

Alejandro Matías Luis Ignacio Reyes Cotapos (24 February 1825 – 8 January 1884) was a Chilean lawyer and politician.

== Life and career ==
Reyes was born in Santiago to Ignacio de Reyes Saravia and Micaela Pérez Cotapos de la Lastra. He married twice, first to Hortensia Lavalle Correas, then Fanny Ovalle Vicuña. Reyes earned a degree in law from the University of Chile in 1845.

Throughout his political career, Reyes remained allied with Manuel Montt and Antonio Varas, whose supporters formally established the National Party in 1857. In 1849, Reyes was named an alternate member of the Chamber of Deputies from Caupolicán, but never took office. He began working for the Santiago municipal government in 1851. Reyes won his first parliamentary election the next year, taking a seat in the Chamber of Deputies as a representative of Los Ángeles and Yungay. He was reelected in 1855 from San Fernando and again in 1858, from Melipilla and La Victoria, a district of Santiago. As a legislator, Reyes served on the industry, treasury, and war committees.

Upon his return from exile in Europe in 1862, Reyes became a diplomat and helped reach treaties with Ecuador and Costa Rica. Later, Reyes aided in the drafting of the legal codes regulating commerce, civil actions, and criminal activity. He was Minister of Finance between 1864 and 1869. From 1868 to 1870, Reyes served as concurrently as interior and foreign minister. Reyes also returned to the Chamber of Deputies, representing Itata between 1863 and 1867. After his term ended, Reyes became a judge on the Santiago Appeals Court. He was appointed to the Supreme Court of Chile in 1870, and concurrently took office as a senator from Curicó. Reyes stepped down from the Senate in 1882, and relinquished his judgeship in 1883, before dying in Santiago on 8 January 1884. Outside of politics, Reyes nurtured an interest in winemaking, and started a vineyard in Buin.
