= Benjamín Subercaseaux =

Chilean writer and researcher

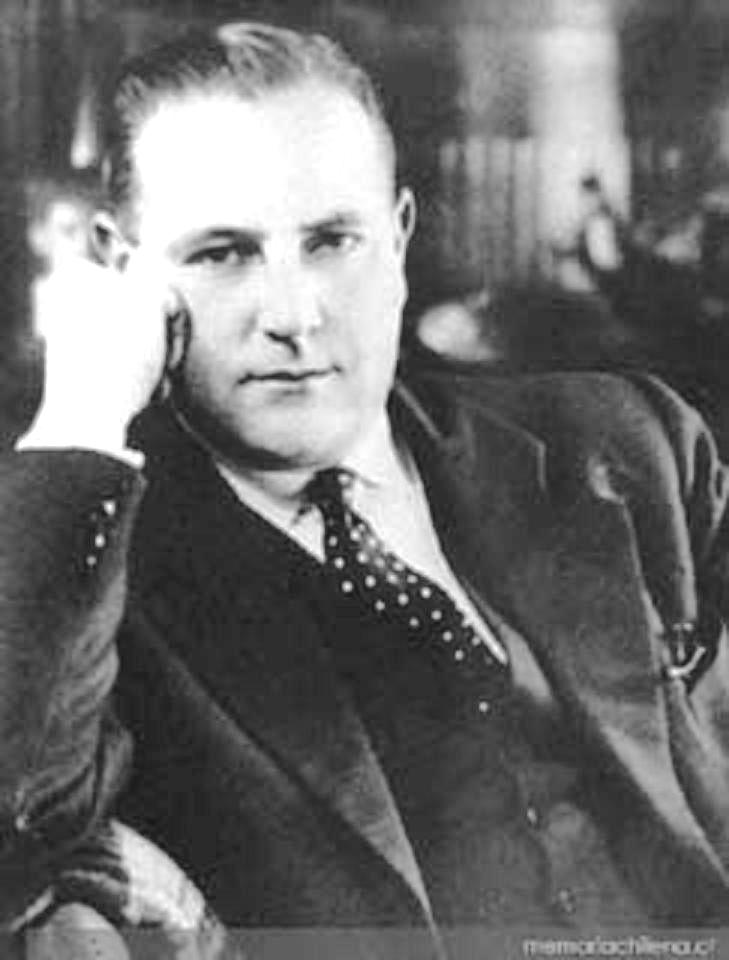
Benjamín Subercaseaux

Benjamín Subercaseaux Zañartu (1902–1973) was a Chilean writer and researcher. He won the Chilean National Prize for Literature in 1963.

Subercaseaux was the son of Benjamín Subercaseaux Browne and Ida Zañartu Luca. His father died shortly after his birth, and he was raised by his mother and his paternal grandmother, Juana Browne. He made his first visit to Europe in 1909 when he was seven years old, and during his stay visited several countries, including France. Upon returning to Chile, he focused on his studies.

At the age of 16, Subercaseaux enrolled in the School of Medicine at the University of Santiago, but was conflicted about a medical career. He decided to move to Paris, and enrolled at the Sorbonne to study general psychology.
