= Olivia de Santiago Concha, 4th Marchioness of Casa Concha =

Chilean noblewoman

The Most Illustrious Olivia de Santiago Concha
- 4th Marchioness of Casa Concha; 4th Marchioness of Rocafuerte
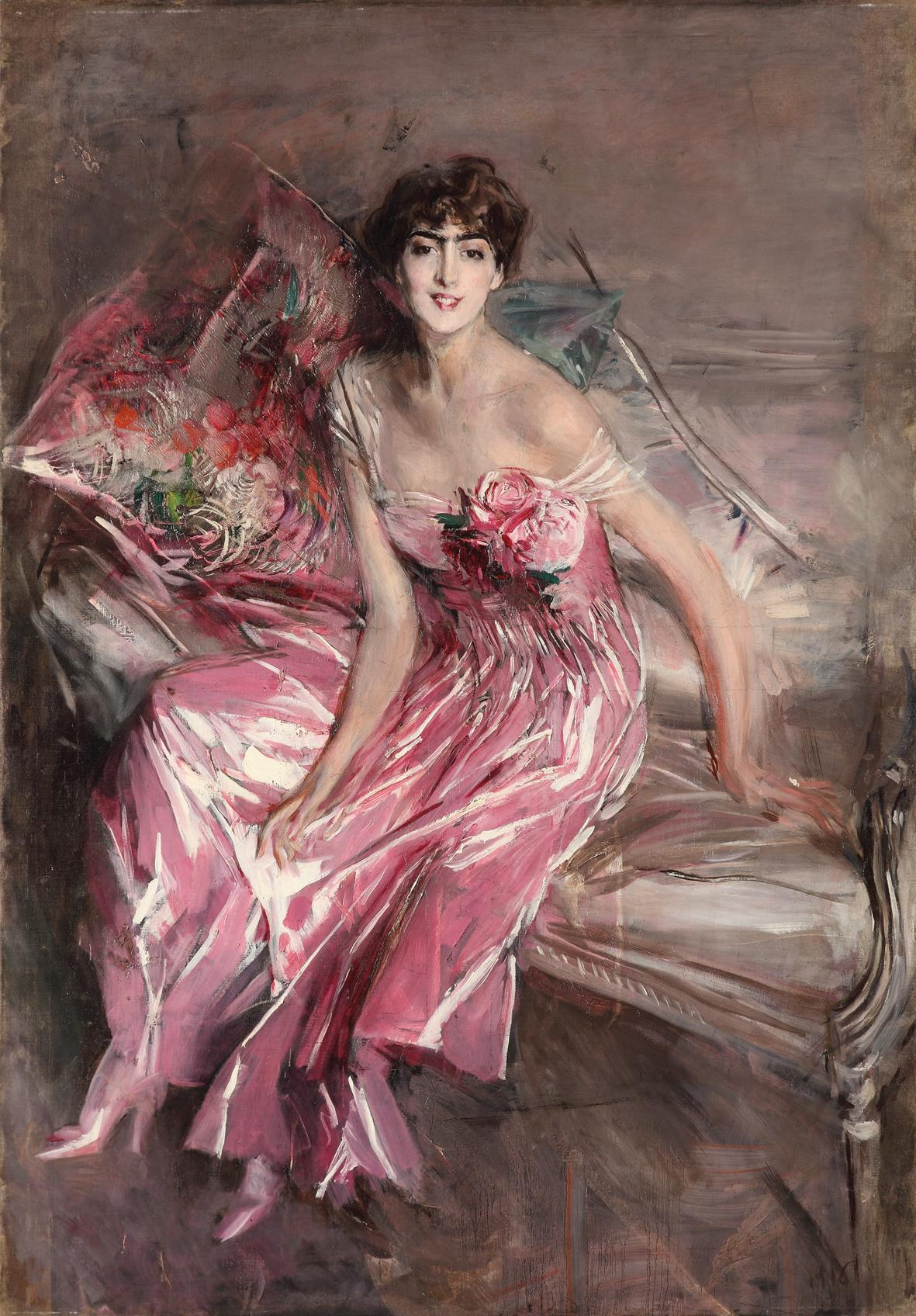
- The Lady in Rose by Giovanni Boldini
- Born: 15 November 1892; Santiago, Chile
- Died: 30 September 1977 (aged 84); Santiago, Chile
- Spouses: Mariano Fontecilla Varas, 4th Marquess of Montepío (m. 1923; died 1977)
- Issue: Mariano Fontecilla, 5th Marquess of Casa Concha
- Father: Daniel de Santiago Concha Subercaseaux
- Mother: Carolina Valdés Ortúzar

Olivia Sofía de Santiago Concha y Valdés, 4th Marchioness of Casa Concha, 4th Marchioness of Rocafuerte (15 November 1892 – 30 September 1977) was a Chilean noblewoman.

== Life and family ==
Olivia was born in Santiago on 15 November 1892, as the child of Daniel Santiago Concha Subercaseaux, a civil engineer, and his wife Carolina Valdés Ortúzar. Her paternal grandfather, Melchor Concha y Toro, was a successful businessman and Chilean politician.

In 1916, while her family was staying in Paris, Olivia was portrayed by the Italian painter Giovanni Boldini, who was in his final years. Boldini, who had painted many royals and aristocrats, liked Olivia's portrait (La signora in rosa, "the lady in rose") so much, that he decided to keep it for himself. After a legal battle against the Concha family, Boldini agreed to make a smaller version of the portrait for the buyers. Only in 2016, her son Mariano was able to look at the original painting at the Ferrara museum where it is kept.

During the first half of the 20th century, Concha y Toro vineyard, the Concha's family business, suffered harsh financial difficulties. Olivia, who had inherited his grandfather's business abilities, was able to put the company back on track. Today, Concha y Toro is the largest producer and exporter of wines from Latin America and one of the ten largest wine companies in the world.

== Marriage and issue ==
In 1923, Olivia married the diplomat and politician Mariano Fontecilla Varas, who would later reclaim the title of Marquess of Montepío. They had one son:

- Mariano Fontecilla de Santiago Concha, 5th Marquess of Casa Concha (b. Santiago 28 November 1924).

== Titles ==
Arms of the marquess of Casa Concha.

Olivia was a direct-line descendant of both José de Santiago Concha, 1st Marquess of Casa Concha and Nicolás Jiménez de Lobatón, 1st Marquess of Rocafuerte. Both were Spanish officers in the Viceroyalty of Peru, and their titles had expired shortly after the Peruvian War of Independence as their successors did not request them. Olivia's uncle, Carlos Concha Subercaseaux, requested both of the titles in 1915, but he died two years later in 1917.

Olivia obtained the rehabilitation of both titles. She succeeded as marchioness of Rocafuerte in 1953 and marchioness of Casa Concha in 1970.
