= Conservatorio Nacional de Música =

The term Conservatorio Nacional de Música (National Conservatory of Music) appears in the official name of several national conservatories (schools of music and other related arts) in the Spanish-speaking world:

- Conservatorio Nacional de Música (Argentina)
- Conservatorio Nacional de Música (Bolivia)
- Conservatorio Nacional de Música (Chile)
- Conservatorio Nacional de Música (Dominican Republic)
- Conservatorio Nacional de Música (Guatemala)
- Conservatorio Nacional de Música (Mexico)
- Conservatorio Nacional de Música (Peru)
- Conservatorio Nacional de Música Juan José Landaeta (Venezuela)
