= Victoria Subercaseaux =

Chilean socialite

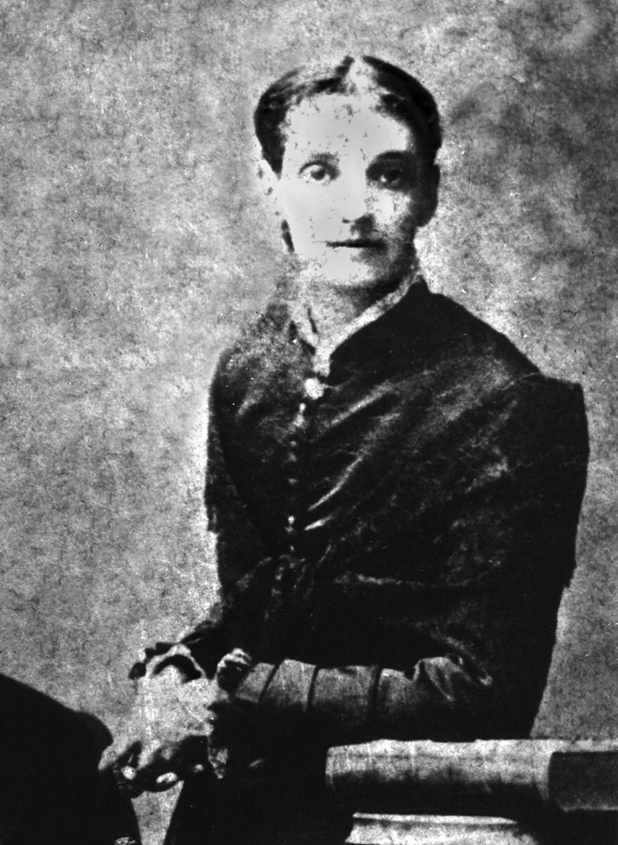
- Born: Victoria Subercaseaux Vicuña; 28 July 1848; Santiago, Chile
- Died: 4 March 1931 (aged 82); Santiago, Chile
- Occupation: Socialite
- Spouse: Benjamín Vicuña Mackenna (m. 1867; died 1886)
- Children: 8
- Family: Subercaseaux

Victoria Subercaseaux Vicuña (28 July 1848 - 4 March 1931) was a Chilean socialite who made significant contributions to the political and intellectual area of her country. She was made Honorary Director of the Library of the Bando de Piedad and promoted the Protective Society, as well as she carried out humanitarian work with the disabled and veterans of the War of the Pacific. She was also a political advisor to her husband, Mayor Benjamín Vicuña Mackenna.

== Biography ==
Victoria Subercaseaux Vicuña was born in Santiago on 28 July 1848 to Ramón Subercaseaux Mercado and Magdalena Vicuña Aguirre. Through her father Subercaseaux was a member of the Subercaseaux family.

Her childhood was spent between the family's rural property, the Llano Subercaseaux, and the family home in the country's capital. Subercaseaux attended Miss Whitelock Private School, although her training was completed with private tutors. Her education was the same as that of the young ladies in her class and she learned piano, in which she excelled. She performed private concerts in family gatherings in front of distinguished guests.

In 1866, Subercaseaux was introduced to society during the official dance that celebrated the reelection of the President of Chile José Joaquín Pérez, where she met her first cousin Benjamín Vicuña Mackenna. The following year they married and as a result of the marriage, they had 8 children, of whom only 4 reached adulthood: Blanca, María, Eugenia and Benjamín.

In addition to being her husband's companion in various political and formal events, Subercaseaux was her advisor and her main support. She died on 4 March 1931 and was buried in the hermitage of Cerro Santa Lucía, along with the ashes of her husband and her son Benjamin.

== Tributes ==
A street in Barrio Lastarria of Santiago was named after her by the Municipality of Santiago in 1931 during the celebrations for the Centennial of Vicuña Mackenna. In this street, she had her residence after being widowed, where she carried out spiritualistic practices.
