= Rafael Larraín Moxó =

Chilean politician

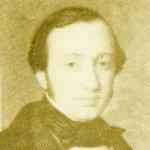

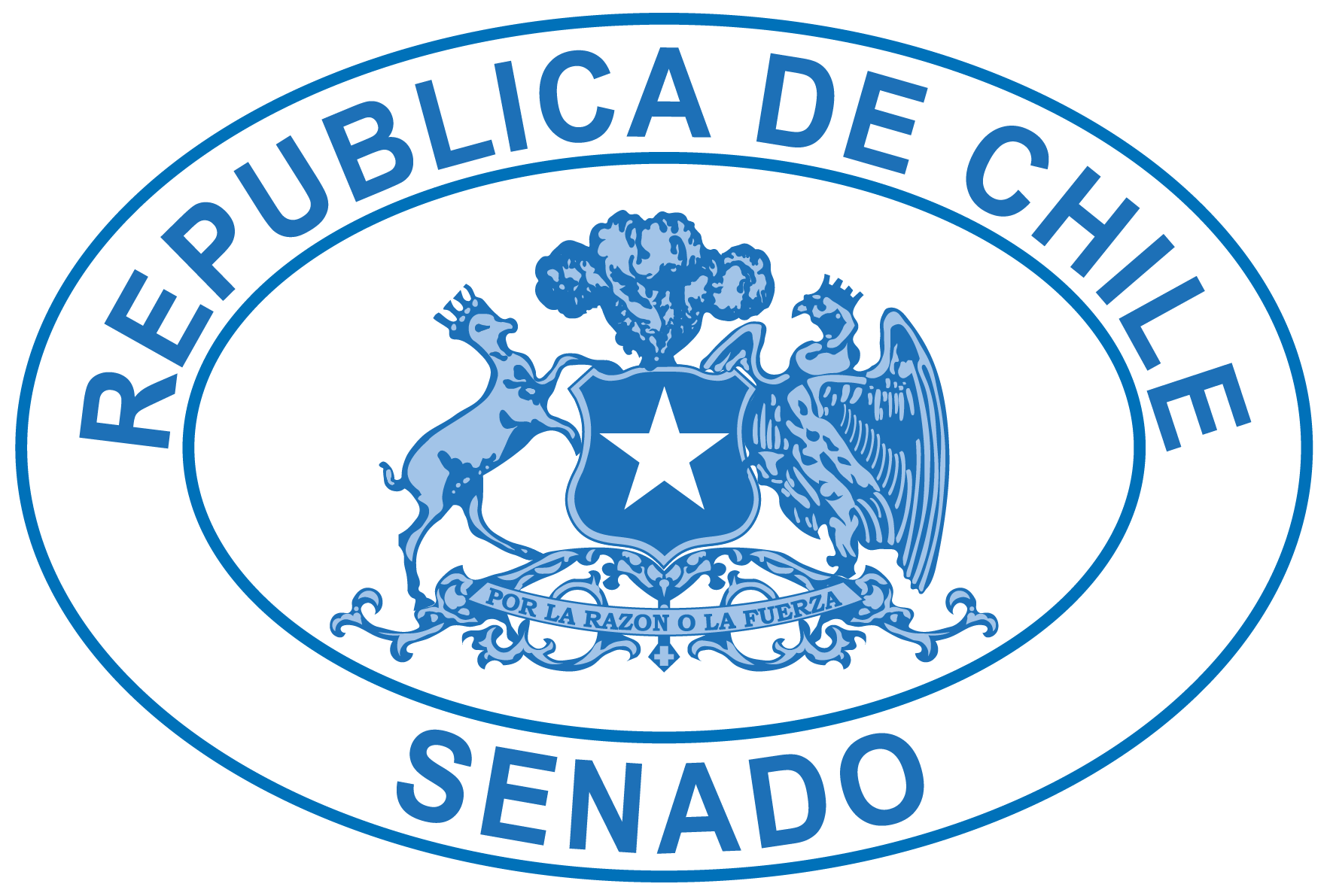
President of the Senate of the Republic of Chile
- In office 1864 – June 1864
- Preceded by: Manuel José Cerda
- Succeeded by: Manuel Antonio Tocornal Grez

Personal details
- Born: 13 February 1813 Buin, Chile
- Died: 28 December 1892 (aged 79) Santiago, Chile
- Party: Conservative Party
- Occupation: Politician

José Rafael Larraín Moxó (born 16 February 1813 – 28 December 1892) was a Chilean politician, farmer, businessman and banker. Elected senator for Santiago for four terms from 1855 to 1882, he was also president of the Senate of Chile from 1864 to 1867. A co-founder of the National Agricultural Society, he was its director and president from 1845 to 1847, and from 1875 to 1893. In 1859, he co-founded a credit institution, the Banco de Chile, and became president of the Bank of Valparaiso in 1874 and later the National Bank. A member of the Conservative Party, he was its president from 1884 to 1885.

On 19 October 1839, he married Victoria Prieto Warnes, the daughter of then-president Joaquín Prieto.
