= Paz Yrarrázabal =

Chilean actress

Paz Eufrasia Yrarrázaval Donoso (May 16, 1931 in Santiago – April 11, 2010) was a Chilean actress, best known for her work in television series during the 1980s and 1990s. Her credits included Mi nombre es Lara, La madrastra and La torre 10.

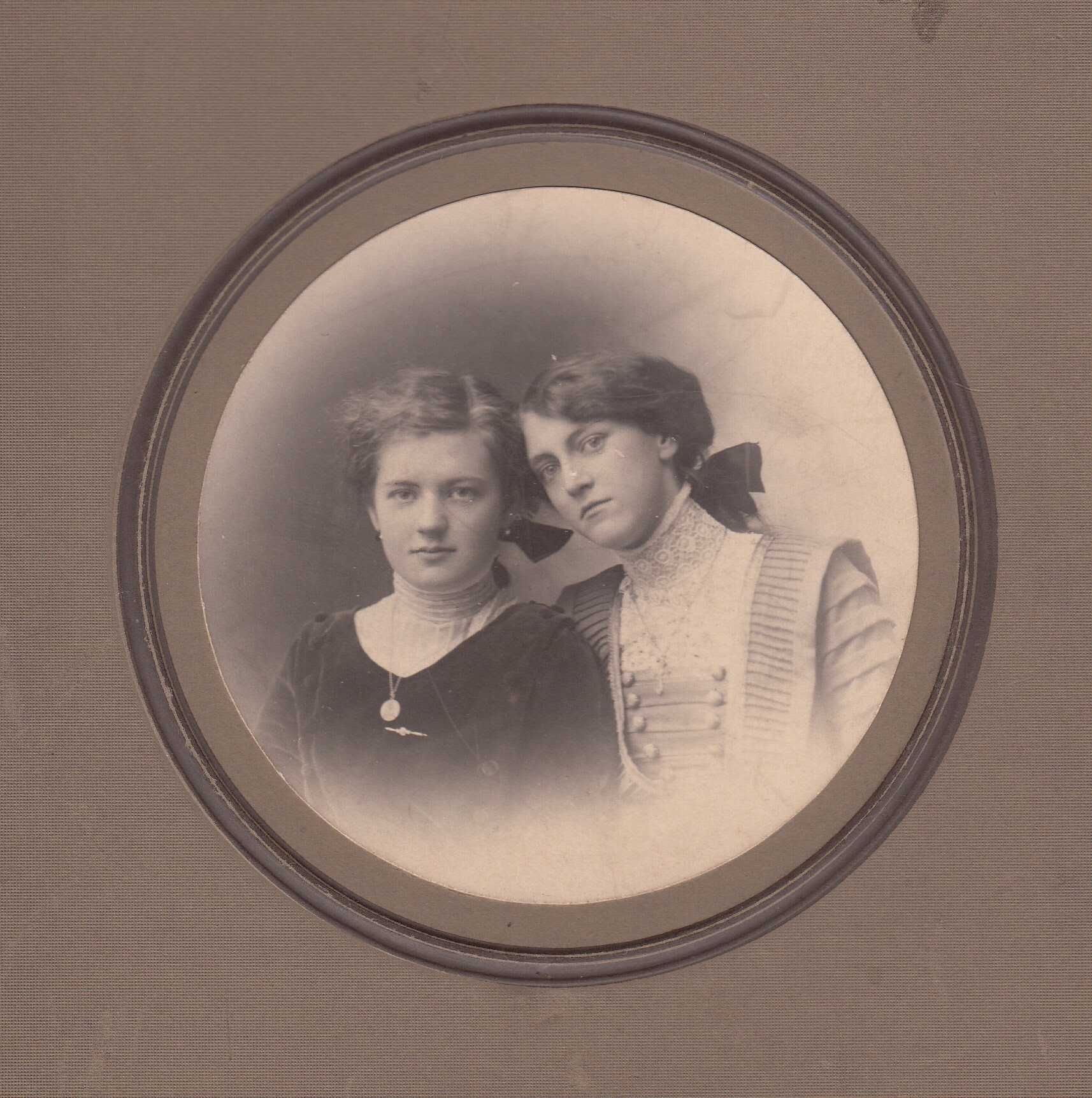
His mother Ana Donoso Foster and Elena Errázuriz Mackenna

Paz, daughter of Joaquín Yrarrázaval Larraín, of Basque descent, and Ana Donoso Foster, served as the former director of the Escuela de Teatro at Pontifical Catholic University of Chile (UC), where she studied acting. She also founded two Chilean theater companies: Ictus and Teatro de Cámara.

Yrarrázaval, who suffered from rheumatoid arthritis, died around 2 a.m. on April 11, 2010, at her apartment in Providencia, Chile, at the age of 78. Her funeral was held at Iglesia de la Anunciación in Plaza Pedro de Valdivia and she was buried at Cementerio Católico.
