= Pedro Félix Vicuña =

Chilean journalist and politician

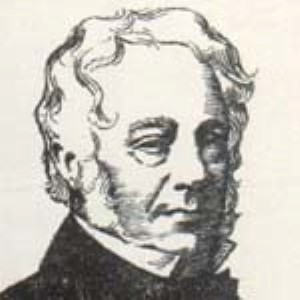
Portrait of Pedro Félix Vicuña Aguirre

Pedro Félix Vicuña Aguirre (February 21, 1805, Santiago, Viceroyalty of Peru – May 24, 1874, Santiago) was a Chilean journalist and one of the founders in 1827 of the newspaper El Mercurio de Valparaíso, the oldest existing newspaper in Spanish language. He was also a liberal writer and politician.

== Early life ==
Vicuña was born in Santiago, the son of Francisco Ramón Vicuña and of Mariana de Aguirre y Boza. Vicuña's father served two brief terms as acting president of Chile in 1829, and was widely considered as the head of the Liberal party. Pedro Félix Vicuña received an excellent education, studying humanities and commerce. From a young age he showed an interest in letters, and particularly in journalism. In 1825, at the age of 20, he moved from Santiago to Valparaíso, where he bought a printing press and began publishing El Telégrafo Mercantil y Político. This periodical was founded October 3, 1826, and 89 issues were published. In 1826, he married Carmen Mackenna, daughter of Brigadier Juan Mackenna, and they had thirteen children.

In 1827, at the age of 21, he founded the newspaper El Mercurio de Valparaíso, together with typographers Thomas Wells and Ignacio Silva. The first issue appeared September 12, 1827. Initially it was published only on Wednesdays and Saturdays, but in 1829 it became a daily. That same year, Vicuña sold his interest in the newspaper and moved back to Santiago (this was also the year that his father happened to serve as president of Chile.)

Back in the capital, he worked as editor for the newspaper La Ley y la Justicia. He also participated in El Censor (1830) and the magazine Paz Perpetua a los Chilenos (1836). As the result of ideas he expressed in Paz perpetua, he gained the enmity of Conservative Interior Minister Diego Portales. Vicuña Aguirre was considered a liberal and a revolutionary.

== Political career ==
In 1831 Vicuña was elected deputy from La Serena, but his election was annulled by the Chamber of Deputies, dominated by the Conservatives. The same year his son Benjamín Vicuña Mackenna, a future journalist and historian, was born to him and his wife. Disillusioned, he returned to rural life. In 1840 he supported the candidacy of Francisco Antonio Pinto, also a Liberal, and opposed Manuel Bulnes.

In 1842 he published El Observador, and in 1845 El Republicano, both of which supported the candidacy of liberal general Ramón Freire. As a result, he was exiled, and went to Peru. In Peru he wrote the book Ocho meses de destierro o cartas sobre el Perú (Eight Months of Exile, or Letters About Peru). It was published in 1847 after his return to Chile.

He aided the revolutionaries of 1851, and was named intendente of Concepción during the armed rebellion. He fought government troops in the Battle of Loncomilla (December 8, 1815). Although he was defeated, he refused to sign the Treaty of Purapel, which ended the civil war.

In 1852 he wrote El porvenir del hombre (The Future of Man), considered his greatest work. In 1853 he published another autobiographical work, Memorias Íntimas. He was again elected to the Chamber of Deputies, for La Serena in 1864 and for Ovalle in 1867. He supported three important reform projects — reform of the constitution, creation of a national bank, and organization of a mining tribunal. In his 1867 term he introduced a bill to end imprisonment for debt, which was passed by the Congress. In 1870 he was elected senator for the first of two terms. He died in 1874 in Santiago.

== Additional information ==
=== See also ===
- Vicuña family

=== Selected bibliography ===
- Vicuña, Pedro Félix (1858). El Porvenir del Hombre (in Spanish). Santiago, Chile: Imprenta del Comercio. pp. 266.

=== Sources ===
- Pedro Félix Vicuña, Retrieved 15 October 2008
- "Biografía de Pedro Félix Vicuña". Icarito (in Spanish). Diario La Tercera. Archived from the original on September 16, 2008.
- "Pedro Félix Vicuña" (in Spanish).
