= Ivette Vergara =

Chilean journalist and television presenter

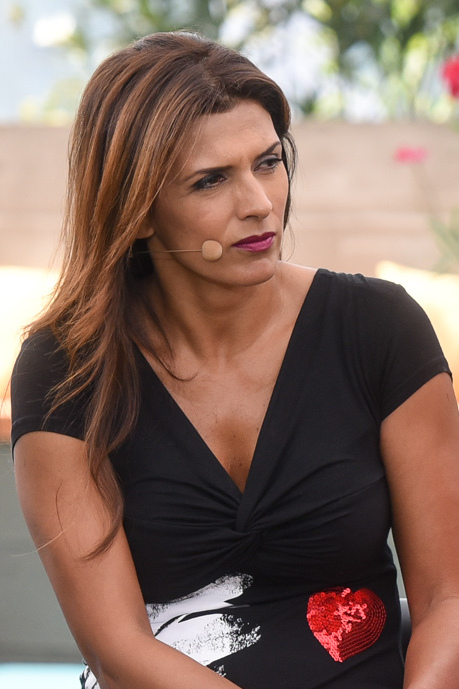
- Born: Ivette Marilú Vergara Ulloa; 26 February 1972 (age 54); Santiago, Chile
- Occupations: Journalist, presenter
- Spouses: Sergio Kozak (1996–2000); Fernando Solabarrieta (2001–present)

Ivette Marilú Vergara Ulloa (born 26 February 1972) is a Chilean journalist and television presenter. She began her television career as a model in 1991, and later worked as a presenter, starting at TVN on programs such as Hugo. She currently works for the channel Mega, where she participates in the morning program Mucho gusto.

== Personal life ==
Ivette Vergara is the daughter of former army captain Aquiles Vergara Muñoz, who was convicted of a homicide in the so-called Puerto Aysén case in 1973, during the military dictatorship.

She is a fan of sports, particularly volleyball, and has played for San Sebastián University's team.

Vergara married businessman Sergio Kozak in 1996. She was the subject of a public scandal in 2000, when DNA tests revealed that her son had been conceived during an affair with sports reporter and journalist Fernando Solabarrieta. She and Kozak divorced, and she married Solabarrieta in 2001. They have three children – Nicolás, Iñaki, and Maite.

== Media career ==
At age 17, in 1990, she was elected queen of the "Miss Paula" beauty contest. In 1992 she starred in the music video for "No te portes mal" by the Argentine group GIT, while studying technology in Food at the University of Santiago.

In 1993, she appeared on La Red's musical show Top 30, which would be later be hosted by Rafael Araneda. She also had a supporting role in the telenovela Marrón glacé.

In 1994, Vergara came to work as a journalist at TVN, a station where she would create the music video program Telekinesis. Her first foray as a presenter was in 1995 with the program Hugo, where she stayed until 1997. From 1998 to 2003 she hosted the variety show Día a día.

From 2006 to 2010 she participated as a reporter on the Chilevisión morning show Gente como tú, led by Leo Caprile. At the same station she hosted the Festival del Huaso de Olmué.

In November 2010, she became the director of Mujeres primero on La Red, but after a turn to show business, she was fired in January 2011. In 2012, she hosted the TVN travel program La Ruta de Gengis Khan with Ricardo Astorga.

In 2013 Vergara came to Mega as a reporter for the service program A Viva Voz, which was taken off the air due to low ratings. In the middle of the same year she joined the panel of Mega's morning program, Mucho gusto, where she shared the screen with Luis Jara and Kathy Salosny. She was also called on to host the Dichato Festival.

She joined Mega's Sports Department to be with her husband Fernando Solabarrieta during the transmission of the 2018 World Cup in Russia.

== Programs ==
- Top 30 (1993–1994), La Red
- Telekinesis (1994), TVN
- Hugo (1995–1997), TVN
- Hola verano (1996), TVN
- Día a día (1998–2002), TVN
- Angeles (2003), Chilevisión
- Gente como tú (2006–2010), Chilevisión
- Huaso de Olmué Festival (2008–2010), Chilevisión
- Bajo sospecha (2009), Chilevisión
- Mujeres primero (2010–2011), La Red
- La Ruta de Gengis Khan (2012), TVN
- A Viva Voz (2013), Mega
- Mucho gusto (2013–present), Mega
