= Julita Astaburuaga =

Chilean socialite

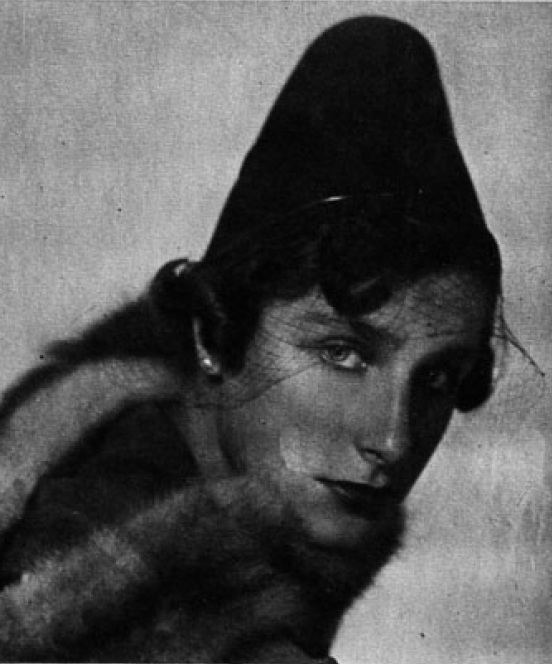
- Born: Julia Elena Astaburuaga Larraín; 17 April 1919; Santiago, Chile
- Died: 14 March 2016 (aged 96); Santiago, Chile
- Occupation: Socialite
- Spouse: Fernando Maquieira Elizalde
- Children: 2

Julia Elena Astaburuaga Larraín (17 April 1919 - 14 March 2016), better known as Julita Astaburuaga, was a prominent Chilean socialite and a recognized icon of Chilean high society.

== Early life and family background ==
Born into a traditional and conservative family, Astaburuaga was the second daughter of Jorge Astaburuaga Lyon and Elena Larraín Velasco, and she had two brothers, Carlos and Jorge. Her paternal grandfather, Jorge Astaburuaga Vergara, had held positions as a deputy, mayor, and diplomat. On the other hand, her maternal grandfather, Carlos Larraín Claro, had served as Minister of War and Navy under Presidents Pedro Montt, Elías Fernández Albano, and Emiliano Figueroa Larraín. Astaburuaga spent some time in Paris before returning to Santiago, where she attended various schools, including Jeanne D'Arc, the English Nuns, the English University, and the French Nuns, where she stayed as a boarder.

In 1939, Astaburuaga participated in the national beauty contest, which was a precursor to Miss Universe Chile. She achieved second place in the contest, sharing the position with María Luisa Correa. The winner that year was Elisa Ripamonti, who later became the wife of politician Francisco Bulnes Sanfuentes.

== Marriage, career, and later years ==
At the age of 27, Astaburuaga married diplomat Fernando Maquieira Elizalde, with whom she had two children: Cristián, who followed in his father's career, and Diego, a poet. Two days after their wedding, which took place in the Iglesia El Golf in 1947, the couple relocated to New York City, where Maquieira became the secretary of the Chilean embassy at the United Nations. She accompanied her husband to various countries until they eventually returned to Chile in the early 1970s. After twenty-five years of living together, they separated. In the following decade, Astaburuaga became the director of the Corporación Amigos del Teatro Municipal (Friends of the Municipal Theater Corporation).

In 1996, Astaburuaga published a book titled Así lo hago yo ("This is How I Do It"), which includes chronicles about her life and provides advice on gastronomy, manners, and other topics. In September 2009, due to her appreciation and past connections during her time living with her husband in the diplomatic mission in Peru, she made efforts to strengthen relations between the two countries. As a result, she was awarded the "Order of Merit for Distinguished Services," which was presented at the Embassy of Peru in Chile.

Astaburuaga died from pancreatic cancer on the morning of March 14, 2016, at the age of 96.
