= Chilean Ladies League =

Chilean women's organization (1912–c. 1931

The Chilean Ladies League (Spanish: Liga de Damas Chilenas; 1912 – c. 1931) was a Chilean upper–class women's organization linked to the Catholic Church, which prompted trades for women and women's unions. Initially founded as the Chilean Ladies League Against Theatrical Licensing (Spanish: Liga de Señoras Chilenas contra la Licencia Teatral), the league first functioned to censor plays, literature and later films which were deemed immoral.

== History ==
On 20 April 1912, Adela Edwards Salas published an article in the La Revista Católica in which she emphasised the supposed relationship between the theater and national moral decline. Edward's posited that the deterioration of morals she saw being presented in contemporary Chilean theater was a reflect of a larger social shift. In order to prevent the performances of immoral plays, the article purposed the founding (Note: Edwards' further states that the idea of establishing such league was not her own, but that of an unnamed friend.) of a ladies' association modelled after the League of Catholic Ladies of Uruguay (Spanish: Liga de Damas Católicas de Uruguay).

The first meeting to establish the league was held in Santiago on 12 July 1912. Attended by 25 upper-class women, including the leagues co-founder and first director Amalia Errázuriz de Subercaseaux, the meeting was also attended by the politicians Ramón Subercaseaux Vicuña, Ismael Valdés Vergara, Antonio Huneeus and Francisco Concha Castillo.

The first General assembly of the league was held on 25 July 1912, and was attended by 450 women. The league was later disbanded around 1931.
