= Benjamín Vicuña Mackenna =

Chilean historian and politician

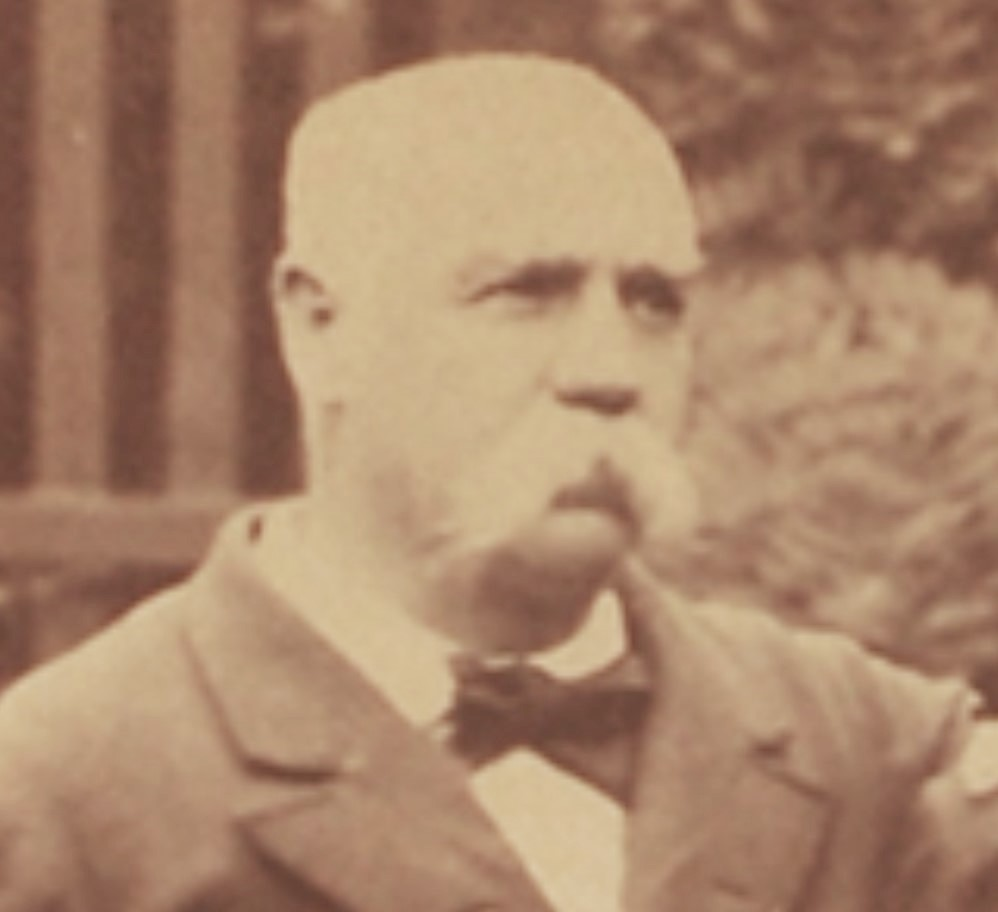

Member of the Senate
- In office 1 June 1876 – 1 June 1885
- Constituency: Coquimbo and Santiago

President of the Liberal Democratic Party
- In office 1876–1886
- Preceded by: Position created
- Succeeded by: Position abolished

Personal details
- Born: August 25, 1831 Santiago, Chile
- Died: January 25, 1886 (aged 54) Santa Rosa de Colmo, Chile
- Spouse: Victoria Subercaseaux (m. 1867)
- Children: 8

Benjamín Vicuña Mackenna (August 25, 1831 – January 25, 1886) was a Chilean writer, journalist, historian and politician. Vicuña Mackenna was of Irish and Basque descent.

== Biography ==
Benjamín Vicuña Mackenna was born in Santiago, the son of Pedro Félix Vicuña and Carmen Mackenna Vicuña, and grandson of General Juan Mackenna, hero of the Chilean War of Independence. He studied in Santiago, and joined the school of law in 1849. From the beginning of his career he contributed to La Tribuna newspaper, writing political articles. In 1851 he participated in Pedro Urriola's revolution against the government but was taken prisoner during the attack on the headquarters of the Chacabuco Regiment. On 4 July 1851 Vicuña Mackenna and Roberto Souper managed to escape from the prison disguised as women. In 1852 he lived in exile in the United States, and travelled from San Francisco through Mexico and Canada. A year later he studied agronomy in England, and then visited many parts of Europe including Ireland.

Back in Chile, in 1856 Vicuña Mackenna graduated as a lawyer from the Universidad de Chile. Although he did not practice as a barrister, his political and other writings were solidly based on legal knowledge. Together with Isidoro Errázuriz, in 1858 Vicuña Mackenna founded the newspaper La Asamblea Constitucional. He was expelled by the government and exiled to England, but was allowed to return in 1863. That year he began contributing to El Mercurio newspaper. In 1865 he was in New York as envoy of the Chilean government, and founded La Voz de América newspaper. Elected national senator for a six-year term, in 1872 Benjamín Vicuña Mackenna was also appointed mayor of Santiago. His political career was interrupted in 1875 when he was defeated by Federico Errázuriz Zañartu in the Chilean presidential elections. He dedicated his life to journalism and writing, and in 1880 edited El Nuevo Ferrocarril and La Nación.

Vicuña Mackenna's most important works are 'El sitio de Chillán' (1849), 'La agricultura aplicada a Chile' (published in London, 1853), 'Chili' (Paris, 1855), 'Tres años de viajes' (1856), 'Ostracismo de los Carrera' (1857), 'Historia de la revolución del Perú' (1860), 'Ostracismo de O'Higgins' (1860), 'Diego de Almagro' (1862), 'Historia de la Administración Montt' (1861/62), 'Vida de Don Diego Portales' (1861/62), 'Historia de Santiago' (1868), 'Historia de Chile' (1868), 'Historia de Valparaíso' (1868), 'La guerra a muerte' (1868), 'Francisco Moyen' (1868), and dozens of other novels, history books, and political essays, the most popular being 'El Santa Lucía', 'La unión Americana', 'El cambiazo', 'Seis años en el senado de Chile', and 'El 20 de Abril'.

Like his contemporary Bartolomé Mitre in Argentina, Benjamín Vicuña Mackenna represented the intellectual class of the South American landed elites. They initiated mainstream historiography in their countries, and selected and immortalised the national discourse that served those elites in envisioning a model of national values to be imitated by the middle and working classes.

Vicuña Mackenna Park, which is located in northeastern Chile in XV Arica and Parinacota Region, is named after him. Avenida Vicuña Mackenna, a major street in Santiago, is also named for him.

== See also ==
- Vicuña family
- Santa Lucía Hill
- Diego de Rosales

== Selected bibliography ==
- Vicuña Mackenna, Benjamín (1849). El sitio de Chillán (in Spanish). Santiago, Chile: Periodico La Tribuna.
- Vicuña Mackenna, Benjamín (1853). La agricultura aplicada a Chile (in Spanish). London, UK.
- Vicuña Mackenna, Benjamín (1855). Le Chili (in French). Paris, France: Imprimerie et Librairie D´Agriculture et D´Horticulture. p. 144.
- Vicuña Mackenna, Benjamín (1856). Tres años de viajes (in Spanish). Santiago, Chile.
- Vicuña Mackenna, Benjamín (1857). El Ostracismo de los Carreras (in Spanish). Santiago, Chile: Imprenta del Ferrocarril. pp. 553.
- Vicuña Mackenna, Benjamín (1860). Historia de la revolución del Perú (in Spanish). Santiago, Chile.
- Vicuña Mackenna, Benjamín (1860). El Ostracismo del Jeneral D. Bernardo O'Higgins (in Spanish). Valparaíso, Chile: Imprenta i Libreria del Mercurio. pp. 575.
- Vicuña Mackenna, Benjamín (1862). Historia de los Diez Años de la Administración de don Manuel Montt (in Spanish). Vol. I & II. Santiago, Chile: Imprenta Chilena. pp. 1, 785.
- Vicuña Mackenna, Benjamín (1867). Diez Meses de Misión a los Estados Unidos de Norte América Como Ajente Confidencial de Chile (in Spanish). Vol. I & II. Santiago, Chile: Imprenta de la Libertad. p. 850.
- Vicuña Mackenna, Benjamín (1868). La guerra a muerte: memoria sobre las últimas campañas de la Independencia de Chile (1819-1824) (in Spanish). Santiago, Chile: Imprenta Nacional. pp. 562.
- Vicuña Mackenna, Benjamín (1868). Francisco Moyen o lo que fue La Inquisición en América (in Spanish). Engl. transl. by J. W. Duffy, London, 1869. Santiago, Chile: Imprenta Nacional. p. 174.
- Vicuña Mackenna, Benjamín (1869). Historia Crítica y Social de la Ciudad de Santiago Desde su Fundación Hasta Nuestros Días (1541-1868) (in Spanish). Vol. I & II. Valparaíso, Chile: Imprenta i Libreria del Mercurio.
- Vicuña Mackenna, Benjamín (1869). Historia de Valparaíso (1536-1868) (in Spanish). Vol. I–XII. Valparaíso, Chile: Imprenta Albión de Cox i Taylor.
- Vicuña Mackenna, Benjamín (1872). Miscelanea (in Spanish). Valparaíso, Chile: Imprenta i Libreria del Mercurio. pp. 398.
- Vicuña Mackenna, Benjamín (1873). Un Año en la Intendencia de Santiago (in Spanish). Valparaíso, Chile: Imprenta i Libreria del Mercurio. p. 874.
- Vicuña Mackenna, Benjamín (1874). La Verdadera Situación de la Ciudad de Santiago (in Spanish). Valparaíso, Chile: Imprenta i Libreria del Mercurio. p. 115.
- Vicuña Mackenna, Benjamín (1874). La Visita de la Provincia de Santiago (in Spanish). Valparaíso, Chile: Imprenta i Libreria del Mercurio. p. 264.
- Vicuña Mackenna, Benjamín (1876). El Viaje del señor Benjamín Vicuña Mackenna a las Provincias del Sur (in Spanish). Valparaíso, Chile: Imprenta de la Patria. p. 91.
- Vicuña Mackenna, Benjamín (1877). Ensayo Histórico sobre el Clima de Chile (in Spanish). Valparaíso, Chile: Imprenta i Libreria del Mercurio. pp. 490.
- Vicuña Mackenna, Benjamín (1878). Historia de la Jornada del 20 de Abril de 1851, una Batalla en las Calles de Santiago (in Spanish). Santiago, Chile: Rafael Jover. p. 667.
- Vicuña Mackenna, Benjamín (1879). Estudios i Catálogo Completo i Razonado de la Biblioteca Americana, Coleccionada por Gregorio Beeche (in Spanish). Valparaíso, Chile: Imprenta i Libreria del Mercurio. p. 802.
- Vicuña Mackenna, Benjamín (1879). Episodios Marítimos, Las Dos Esmeraldas (in Spanish). Santiago, Chile: Rafael Jover. p. 544.
- Vicuña Mackenna, Benjamín (1880). Guerra del Pacífico (in Spanish). Vol. I–IV. Santiago, Chile: Rafael Jover. pp. 1, 216.
- Vicuña Mackenna, Benjamín (1881). La Edad del Oro en Chile (in Spanish). Santiago, Chile: Imprenta Cervantes. pp. 491.
- Vicuña Mackenna, Benjamín (1882). Vida del Capitán Jeneral de Chile Don Bernardo O´Higgins (in Spanish). Santiago, Chile: Rafael Jover. p. 982.
- Vicuña Mackenna, Benjamín (1882). El Libro de la Plata en Chile (in Spanish). Santiago, Chile: Imprenta Cervantes. p. 607.
- Vicuña Mackenna, Benjamín (1883). El Libro del Cobre i del Carbón de Piedra en Chile (in Spanish). Santiago, Chile: Imprenta Cervantes. p. 607.
- Vicuña Mackenna, Benjamín (1883). Juan Fernández, Historia Verdadera de la Isla de Robinson Crusoe (in Spanish). Santiago, Chile: Rafael Jover. pp. 834.
- Vicuña Mackenna, Benjamín (1885). A Través de Los Andes (in Spanish). Santiago, Chile: Imprenta Gutemberg. p. 366.
- Vicuña Mackenna, Benjamín (1889). Diego de Almagro (in Spanish). Santiago, Chile: Imprenta Cervantes. pp. 122.

=== Sources ===
- Figueroa, Pedro Pablo (1886). Apuntes históricos sobre la vida y las obras de don Benjamín Vicuña Mackenna (in Spanish). Santiago, Chile: Imprenta Victoria.
- Obituario de don Benjamín Vicuña Mackenna (PDF). La Ilustración Española y Americana (in Spanish). Vol. XXXIII. Spain. 1886. pp. 130–132.
- Murray, Edmundo. "Benjamín Vicuña Mackenna". Dictionary of Irish Latin American Biography.
