= Concha y Toro =

Chilean wine company

Viña Concha y Toro S.A.

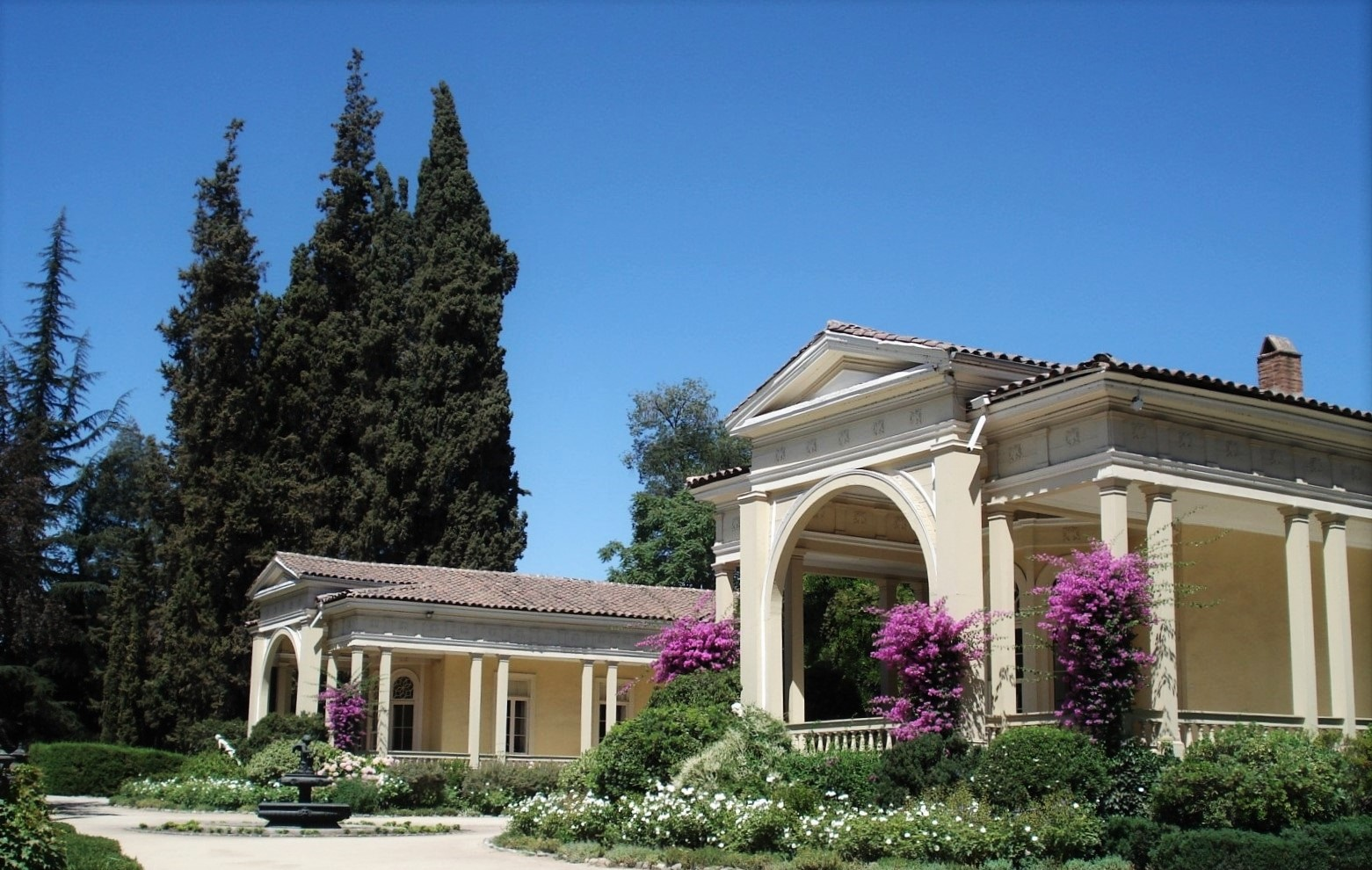
- Type: Sociedad Anónima
- Traded as: BCS: CONCHATORO
- Industry: Beverage
- Founded: 1883 (142–143 years ago)
- Headquarters: Santiago, Chile
- Key people: Alfonso Larraín Santa Maria (Chairman); Eduardo Guilisasti Gana (CEO); Don Melchor de Santiago Concha y Toro (Creator)
- Products: Wine
- Revenue: ▲US$ 965.68 million (2017)
- Net income: ▲US$ 74.36 million (2017)
- Number of employees: 3,596
- Website: conchaytoro.com

Concha y Toro (in English: Shell and Bull) is the largest producer and exporter of wines from Latin America and one of the ten largest wine companies in the world, with more than 33 million cases sold per year in 2014, distributed in 135 countries. Concha y Toro Winery is located in Santiago de Chile, but the company has vineyards in Chile, Argentina and the United States, with more than 10,000 hectares under cultivation in 2016. Their Casillero del Diablo and Don Melchor wines have international recognition. As of 2010 the company is one of the official sponsors of the English football club Manchester United F. C.

== History ==
=== 19th century ===
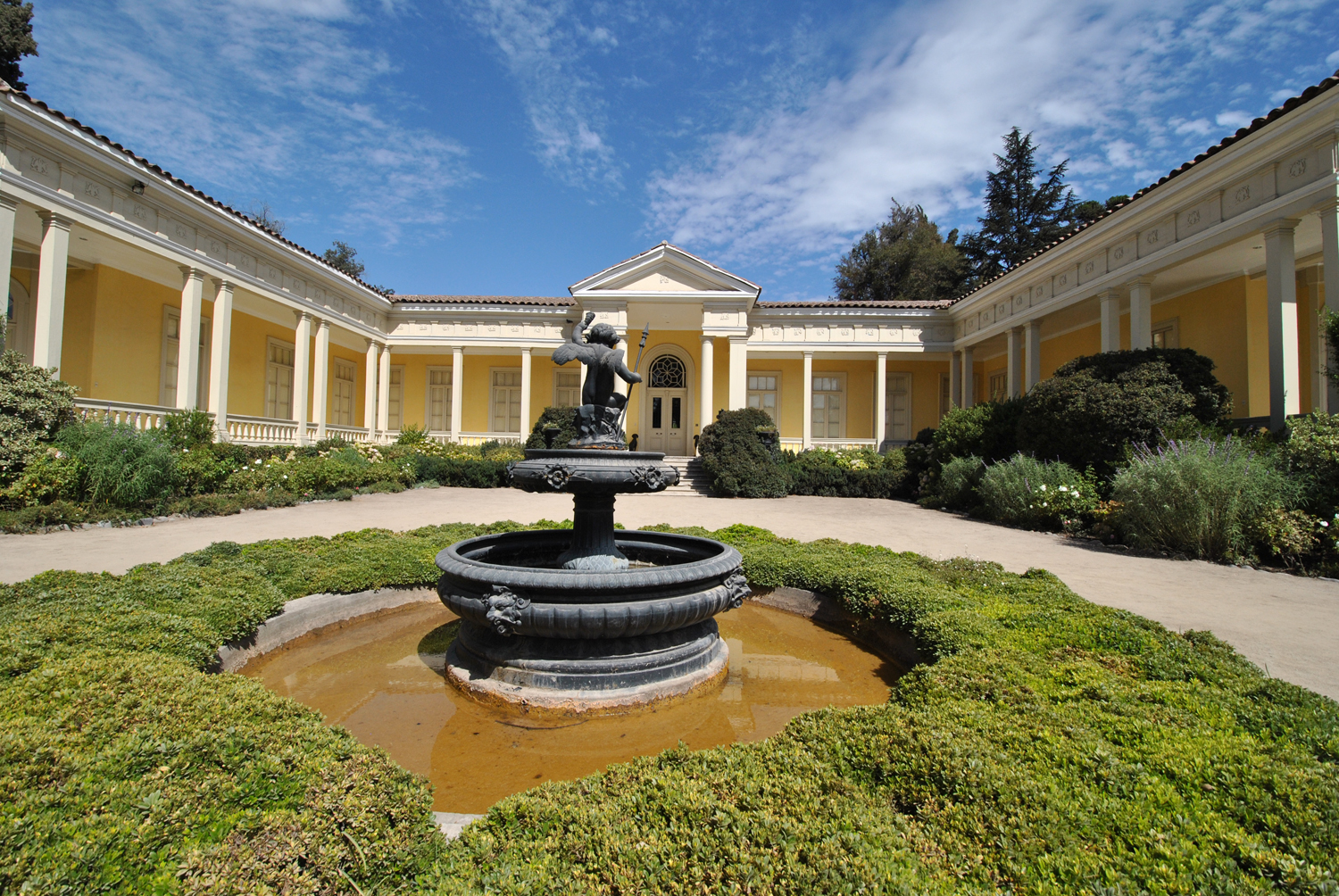
Concha y Toro House, in Pirque.

The Concha y Toro winery was founded in 1883 by Melchor de Santiago Concha y Toro, a former Chilean Minister of Finance, together with his wife, Emiliana Subercaseaux. To establish the vineyard, grape varieties were imported from the Bordeaux region of France, including Cabernet Sauvignon, Sauvignon Blanc, Semillon, Merlot and Carménère.

The company's origins are linked to prominent Chilean families of the nineteenth century. Over time, ownership and management remained associated with descendants of the founding family as well as the Guilisasti and Larraín families. Among the members of the board has been Mariano Fontecilla de Santiago-Concha, diplomat and holder of the title of Marquess of Casa Concha, a descendant of the founder.

In 1999, the company's president, Alfonso Larraín Santa María, initiated proceedings in Spain to succeed to the title of Marquess of Larraín, which had been held by his family.

The company's vineyards and production facilities in Pirque, within the Santiago Metropolitan Region, are connected by internal roads bearing names such as Marqués de Casa Concha and Conde de la Conquista, reflecting elements of the historical background associated with the founding family.

Nobility connections
Shield of the Marquesado de Casa Concha, associated with the founder and later members of the company leadership.

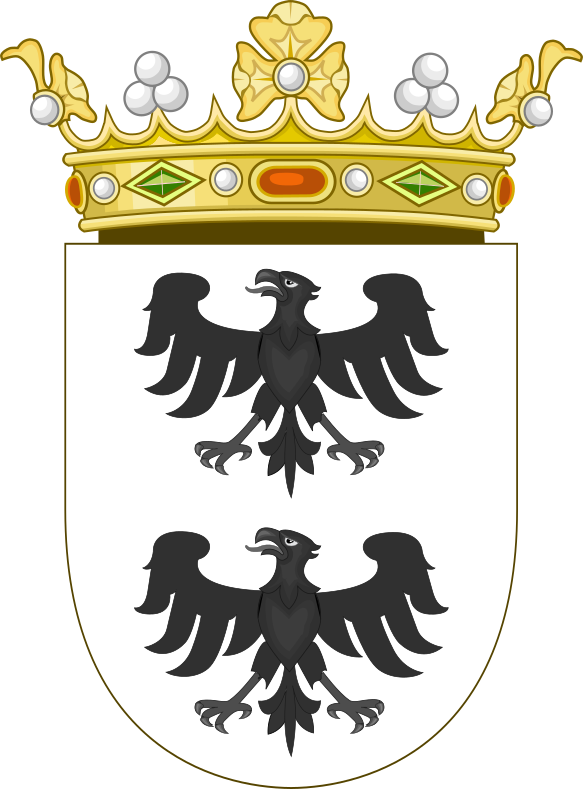
Shield of the Marquesado de Larraín, associated with the Larraín family.

Shield of the Rothschild Family, linked to the creation of the subsidiary Viña Almaviva.

=== 20th century: expansion ===
The vineyard was incorporated as a stock company in 1923 and shares continue to be sold in the Santiago Stock Exchange. Concha y Toro began exporting wine in March 1933 to the port of Rotterdam, the Netherlands. In 1950, the winery began to acquire more vineyards and also began the process of adapting its business to new markets and meeting a higher demand.

In 1966, the Casillero del Diablo brand, the company's hallmark, was inaugurated, and in 1987 the company's first ultra-premium wine, Don Melchor, was launched. In the late 1960s the company began to expand: Viña Maipo was acquired in 1968; Viña Cono Sur created in 1993; Trivento Bodegas in Argentina founded in 1996; a joint venture with Château Mouton Rothschild for the production of Viña Almaviva began in 1997, among others.

In 1971, Eduardo Guilisasti Tagle became chairman of the board, who succeeded in expanding the company. In 1987, after partnering with U.S. importer Banfi Vintners, the company started to incorporate more advanced technology in all of its production stages. It also started using small French oak barriques. In 1994, shares of Viña Concha started trading on the New York Stock Exchange, until his cessation in 2018.

=== 21st century: globalization ===
At the beginning of the 21st century, the company internationalized operations: in 2001 opened a trade, logistics and distribution office in United Kingdom, and then offices in other 11 countries: Brazil, Canada, China, United States, Finland, Japan, Mexico, Norway, Singapore, South Africa and Sweden, which would join the existing offices in Chile and Argentina. In 2010 a sponsorship agreement was signed with the English club Manchester United F.C. In this respect, Manchester United 2020 sponsorship director, Sean Jefferson, said: "Manchester United's relationship with Casillero del Diablo has been one of the most extensive and successful partnerships we ever had. The synergy between the two brands have led to a natural alliance", especially due to equivalence of their symbols and distinctive seals.

In 2011 Concha y Toro bought in United States Fetzer Vineyards, for a value of US$238 million. The transaction included the buy of various Fetzer subsidiaries vineyards, such as Bonterra Vineyards, Five River Wines, Bel Arbor Winery, Jekel Vineyards, and Little Black Dress Wines, which became property of Concha y Toro.

More recently Concha y Toro has advertising campaigns in Discovery Channel, and subsidiary Trivento Vineyards is sponsorship in the Major League Soccer, and has reached sponsorship agreements with football club Inter Miami CF.

== Grape varieties ==
Concha y Toro produces several varietals:

- White: Chardonnay, Sauvignon blanc, Semillon, Gewürztraminer.
- Red: Cabernet Sauvignon, Merlot, Carménère

=== Filial vineyards ===
Dependents and filial vineyards

Chile

- Multiple valleys:
  - Viña Maipo, acquired in 1968.
  - Viña Cono Sur, founded in 1993.
- Maipo Valley:
  - Viña Don Melchor.
  - Viña Almaviva, founded in 1997.
  - Viña Pirque.
  - Viña Santa Isabel.
  - Viña El Mariscal.
  - Viña San Adolfo.
  - Viña Lo Mackenna.
- Maule Valley:
  - Viña Rauco.
  - Viña Lontué.
  - Viña San Clemente.
  - Viña Curicó.
- Cachapoal Valley:
  - Viña Casillero del Diablo.
  - Viña Peumo.
  - Viña Rucahue.
  - Viña Idahue.
  - Viña Las Pataguas.
  - Viña Ucúquer.
- Colchagua Valley:
  - Viña Palo Santo.
  - Viña La Puerta.
  - Viña Las Mercedes.
  - Viña Chomedahue.
  - Viña Agua Santa.
  - Viña El Estero.
- Casablanca Valley:
  - Viña El Triángulo.
  - Viña Lo Ovalle.
  - Viña Los Perales.
- Curicó Valley:
  - Viña Rauco.
  - Viña San Ignacio.
  - Viña San Manuel.
  - Viña Yungay.
- Limarí Valley:
  - Maycas del Limarí, acquired in 2005.
  - Viña Nueva Aurora.
  - Viña Los Acacios.
  - Viña San Julián.
  - Viña El Trapiche Limarí.
  - Viña Lachica.

Argentina

- Mendoza:
  - Viña Trivento, founded in 1996.
  - Finca La Chamiza, founded in 2003.

United States

- California:
  - Fetzer Vineyards, acquired in 2011.
  - Bonterra Vineyards, acquired in 2011.
  - Five River Wines, acquired in 2011.
  - Bel Arbor Winery, acquired in 2011.
  - Jekel Vineyards, acquired in 2011.
  - Coldwater Creek Wines.
  - Sanctuary Wines.
  - Little Black Dress Wines, acquired in 2011.

=== Logistics centers ===
Commercial offices and logistics centers

The Americas

- Chile: VCT Chile.
- Argentina: Trivento Bodegas y Viñedos.
- Brazil: VCT Brazil.
- Canada: Escalade Wine & Spirits.
- United States: Excelsior Wines.
- Mexico: VCT & DG México.

Europe

- Finland: VCT Finland.
- Norway: VCT Norway.
- Sweden: VCT Sweden.
- United Kingdom: Concha y Toro UK.

Africa y Middle East

- South Africa: VCT Africa & Middle East.

Asia

- China: Gan Lu Wine Trading.
- Japan: VCT Japan.
- Singapore: VCT Asia.

=== Trademarks ===
Trademarks
Casillero del Diablo.; Don Melchor.; Amelia.; Carmín de Peumo.; Frontera.; Gran Reserva Serie Riberas.; Gravas del Biobío.; Gravas del Maipo.; Marqués de Casa Concha.; Sunrise.; Terrunyo.; Trío.
Image: Casillero del Diablo, one of the main brands of Concha y Toro.

== Awards and honours ==
- The World's Most Admired Wine Brand, in 2011, 2012 and 2013; second place in 2014, 2017 and 2018, according Drink International.
- The Americas Most Admired Wine Brand, between 2011 and 2019, according Drink International.
- The World's Most Powerful Wine Brand, in 2014 and 2015, according to Intangible Business.
- One of the only three wineries to be included in the top 100 of the best wineries in the world without interruption, according to Wine & Spirits Magazine.
- Best International Drink Company of the year, in 2015 and 2016, awarded by the Drinks Business Awards.
- Casillero del Diablo, Second Most Powerful Wine Brand in the World, in 2018, 2019 and 2020, according to Wine Intelligence.
