= Castilian-Basque aristocracy =

Political elite of Chile

In Chile the Castilian–Basque aristocracy (Spanish: aristocracia castellano-vasca) formed the social and political elite of the country after gaining independence in the early 19th century. Despite the abolition of noble titles in 1817 and the mayorazgo inheritance institution in 1852, the social status of this group remained largely unaffected.

Although the over-representation of people of Castilian–Basque ancestry in the National Congress of Chile has declined since the 19th century, they still hold a significant presence. These individuals are particularly concentrated in the affluent northeastern zone of Santiago, where they, along with other high socio-economic status individuals, display characteristics of an ethnic group.

== History ==
This term, coined by historian Francisco Antonio Encina, refers to the union between the dominant group of the local social system of Castilian origin and certain immigrants from the Basque Country who managed to amass considerable fortunes in Chile.

The Castilian aristocracy was formed by the descendants of the conquerors of Chile and by Spaniards who regularly arrived to settle in the country. The Spanish crown entrusted this group with the exercise of power in its overseas provinces. By the 18th century, this group had consolidated as a landowning and commercial aristocracy.

During the 18th century, many of the Spaniards who came to Chile to work in the colonial administration or commerce were Basques. Thanks to their austere character and commercial ties with the peninsula, many of these immigrants amassed considerable fortunes. They began to establish marital ties with the local elite, who were owners of large land holdings and possessors of social prestige.

This group quickly consolidated as the dominant social class in the second half of the 18th century, retaining their position throughout the 19th century and the first half of the 20th century. As a way of consolidating their power, it was common for this group to buy noble titles or orders of chivalry and establish entailments that allowed them to keep large properties without the need to divide them.

The main settlement center of this group was in the north and central-southern area of the country, from La Serena, passing through Santiago to Concepción, coinciding with the borders of the Captaincy General of Chile. In addition to their open support for the emancipatory movement in the early 19th century, the influence of the Castilian-Basque aristocracy was such that it could be said that the basis of Chilean institutionalism in the 19th and 20th centuries mostly obeyed their direct influence.

Despite the abolition of noble titles in 1817 and entailments in 1852, the position of these families in the Chilean social system did not change until well into the 20th century. In fact, even today, some of these families continue to hold their noble titles, possess great fortunes, and have an important political influence in modern-day Chile.
