= Gonzalo Duarte García de Cortázar =

Chilean prelate

Gonzalo Duarte
- Valparaíso
- Installed: 1998
- Term ended: 2018
- Predecessor: Francisco Javier Errázuriz Ossa
- Successor: Pedro Ossandón

Personal details
- Born: 27 September 1942 (age 84) Quillota, Chile
- Parents: Ignacio Duarte Calderón; María del Carmen García de Cortázar
- Profession: Theologist
- Education: Pontifical Catholic University of Valparaíso (BA); Pontifical Gregorian University (MA)

Great Chancellor of the Pontifical Catholic University of Valparaíso
- In office 1998–2018
- Preceded by: Francisco Javier Errázuriz Ossa
- Succeeded by: Pedro Ossandón

Military Bishop of Chile
- In office 1995–1999
- Preceded by: José Joaquín Matte
- Succeeded by: Pedro Lizama Riquelme

Gonzalo Duarte García de Cortázar (born 27 September 1942) is a Chilean prelate of the Catholic Church who was Bishop of Valparaíso from 1998 to June 2018. Product of it, he was also the Great Chancellor of the Pontifical Catholic University of Valparaíso, his alma mater.

== Biography ==
He was ordained a priest by Bishop Alejandro Menchaca Lira on 8 July 1968. On 31 January 1995, Pope John Paul II named him titular bishop of Lamiggiga and Military Ordinary of Chile. He received his episcopal consecration from Archbishop Piero Biggio on 2 April. John Paul appointed him Bishop of Valparaíso on 4 December 1998.

On 18 May 2018, Duarte submitted his resignation to Pope Francis, as did all the Chilean bishops at the conclusion of a three-day meeting in Rome. On 11 June 2018, Pope Francis accepted his resignation as bishop. Francis replaced him with an Apostolic Administrator as he did all bishops who retired following his personal intervention in the clerical sexual abuse crisis in Chile.

On the day Francis accepted Durate's resignation, he also accepted those of two other Chileans, Bishop Juan Barros Madrid of Osorno, who had been at the center of Chile's controversy over sexual abuse by clergy, and Archbishop Cristián Caro Cordero of Puerto Montt, who like Duerte had submitted his resignation months earlier at the age of 75 as required. It initially seemed that the resignations of Caro and Duerte were unrelated to the sexual abuse scandal, that they were "customary" resignations because of age. However, several former seminarians immediately accused Duerte of sexual abuse. After refusing to comment for several weeks, Duarte said he had tendered his resignation months earlier as required when he turned 75 and that his resignation was unrelated to charges of sexual abuse. He said one complaint against him had been dismissed in court as "without merit" and said a second one misinterpreted an encounter that had nothing sexual about it. Civil authorities heard testimony from Duerte about charges he covered up for abusers on 21 November 2018, The accusers continued to press their case and expressed satisfaction with the progress they were making with the new Apostolic Administrator of Valparaiso, Bishop Pedro Ossandón.

== See also ==
- Catholic Church in Chile
- Catholic sexual abuse cases in Chile
