= Catholic Church sexual abuse cases in Chile =

The sexual abuse of minors by clergy of the Catholic Church in Chile and the failure of Church officials to respond and take responsibility attracted worldwide attention as a critical failure of Pope Francis and the Church as a whole to address the sexual abuse of minors by priests. Among a number of cases, that of Father Fernando Karadima, which became public in 2010, raised questions about the responsibility and complicity of several Chilean bishops, including some of the country's highest-ranking Catholic prelates.

Karadima was accused as early as 1984 of sexually abusing minors. Reports of abuse were not addressed and an early investigation that found accusations against Karadima credible was ignored. When the Vatican found Karadima guilty of sexually abusing minors and psychological abuse in February 2011, it denied him the right to function as a priest for the rest of his life. Several priests he had mentored had by then become bishops. In 2015, Pope Francis appointed one of them, Juan Barros Madrid, to head the diocese of Osorno, provoking protests, especially from the local Catholic community. The appointment proved controversial in Chile, and Pope Francis' defense of Barros in January 2018 drew such an outcry from victims of sexual abuse and their advocates, including Cardinal Seán O'Malley, head of the Pontifical Commission for the Protection of Minors, that Francis ordered a reexamination of the cases of sexual abuse in Chile by the Vatican's chief expert on priestly sexual abuse of minors, Archbishop Charles J. Scicluna. Convinced by the report from that investigation of a widespread failure of the Church hierarchy to recognize and respond to the sexual abuse crisis, Francis called all of Chile's bishops to Rome for consultation, and there all of the country's active bishops offered their resignations.

On July 11, 2019, the statute of limitations on reporting sex abuse against children was removed amid the ongoing sex abuse crisis in the Chilean Catholic Church. On August 30, 2019, Inés San Martín of Crux stated that the Catholic Church in Chile was "hit hardest by the clerical abuse crisis outside the English-speaking world."

== Karadima ==
=== Background ===
Father Fernando Karadima (6 August 1930 – 26 July 2021) was a spiritual leader and father figure for young men from Santiago's social elite. He was based in the "Parroquia El Bosque", which serves some of Santiago's wealthiest and most influential families. His connections extended to officials in the military government of Gen. Augusto Pinochet and to the papal nuncio to Chile, Angelo Sodano, who became a cardinal and Vatican Secretary of State in 1991. Karadima was a dynamic leader, described as "Impeccably dressed and with perfectly groomed nails and slicked-back hair", who "cut an aristocratic figure, appealing to both young and old in Chile's elite."

In 1984 a group of parishioners reported "improper conduct" on the part of Karadima to Juan Francisco Fresno, Archbishop of Santiago de Chile. (Note: Fresno became a cardinal in 1985.) One of them later told a court that he learned that their letter was "torn up and thrown away". Fresno's secretary at the time was one of Karadima's protégés, Juan Barros.

In mid-2003, a young Catholic, José Murillo, informed Cardinal Francisco Javier Errázuriz Ossa, the new Archbishop of Santiago de Chile, by letter that he had been abused by Karadima. The Episcopal Conference of Chile had established guidelines for handling accusations of sexual abuse by clergy months earlier, and the guidelines called for an investigation if the accuser demonstrates "good faith" and did not require an assessment of the accusation itself. Errázuriz told Murillo he was praying for him and in June 2004 he opened the first investigation into Karadima. Two years later, the investigator told Errázuriz that he found the accusers credible and suggesting certain courses of action. Errázuriz rejected the report. He explained years later in an interview with the magazine Qué Pasa that he mistakenly relied on someone else's assessment: "I made a mistake: I asked and overvalued the opinion of a person very close to the accused and the accuser. While the promoter of justice thought that the accusation was plausible, this other person affirmed just the opposite."

=== Public investigations ===
In April 2010 a criminal complaint was filed by victims of sexual abuse by four men who were once devoted followers of Karadima. The Public Ministry appointed Xavier Armendáriz as special prosecutor and he promised an unbiased investigation.

The Reverend Hans Kast testified that he had witnessed sexual abuses as did the Reverend Andrés Ferrada "but no one ever did anything about it". The Reverend Francisco Walker, president of the Ecclesiastical Tribunal, resigned from the court after admitting he had leaked the claimants' personal information to Bishop Arteaga and Father Morales.

After seven months of conducting the probe, the court dismissed the lawsuit, ruling that there was not enough evidence to charge Karadima. One of the claimants said: "We would have liked to appeal, but with defense attorneys like this, who have the Appeals and Supreme Court eating out of their hands, and a number of powerful people who continue to protect Karadima, we knew it would be an uphill battle that we were likely to lose".

In response to the public accusations, Chilean church officials conducted their own investigation and in June 2010 submitted a 700-page report to the Congregation for the Doctrine of the Faith (CDF). While that report was under consideration, Pope Benedict XVI accepted the resignation of Errázuriz and named Ricardo Ezzati Andrello to succeed him as Archbishop of Santiago de Chile. On 16 January 2011 the CDF found Karadima guilty of abusing minors and sentenced him to a life of "prayer and penance", which the Vatican described as "a lifelong prohibition from the public exercise of any ministerial act, particularly confession and the spiritual guidance of any category of persons". His forced retirement included relocation to a place where he will not have contact with previous parishioners or anyone he mentored. On 18 February, Archbishop Ezzati made the decision public. Karadima continued to maintain his innocence. Ezzati announced on 22 June that the CDF had rejected Karadima's appeal and confirmed its original judgment. Ezzati said "there is no place in the priesthood for those who abuse minors and this confirms the vision of the Church in this case. Karadima acknowledged the judgment with his signature, but said Ezzati's "inner convictions are personal". At the time Karadima was living in Providencia in a religious convent.

One of Chile's highest-ranking prelates, long-retired Cardinal Jorge Medina expressed doubts that Karadima could be properly convicted of "sexual abuse" because "A 17-year-old youngster knows what he is doing." He defended the canonical sanctions imposed on Karadima, given his age and merits. One of Karadima's accusers called the cardinal's remark about 17-year-olds "an unwarranted attack". Another said he regarded Medina's statements as "extremely suspicious, as if he wanted to diminish the outline of these grave actions, reducing the issue to homosexuality in a very silly manner, as if, furthermore, homosexuality and abuse were synonymous". The statements, he said, "were an attempt to free from responsibility someone who took advantage of his position of power over more vulnerable persons".

== Karadima bishops ==
Karadima had been influential in the spiritual formation and careers of about 50 priests and several bishops. The bishops who were accused of complicity with Karadima, and their posts when the charges against Karadima became public, were:

- Andrés Arteaga, Auxiliary Bishop of Santiago de Chile and Vice-Chancellor of the Universidad Católica de Chile; (Note: Arteaga was born on 17 January 1959 and ordained on 31 May 1986. He was named Auxiliary Bishop of Santiago de Chile on 10 July 2001 and consecrated on 19 August. In 2000, Cardinal Francisco Javier Errázuriz Ossa, Archbishop of Santiago, named him Vice-Chancellor of the Universidad Católica de Chile. He resigned that post in March 2011.)
- Juan Barros Madrid, Military Bishop of Chile; (Note: Barros was born on 15 July 1956 and ordained on 29 June 1984. He was named Auxiliary Bishop of Valparaíso on 12 April 1995 and consecrated on 29 June. He became Bishop of Iquique on 21 November 2000, Military Ordinary of Chile on 9 October 2004, and Bishop of Osorno on 10 January 2015.)
- Tomislav Koljatic Maroevic, Bishop of Linares, Chile; (Note: Koljatic was born on 19 September 1955 and ordained on 14 August 1987. He was named Auxiliary Bishop of Concepción on 27 November 1997 and consecrated on 6 January 1998. He became Bishop of Linares on 17 January 2003.)
- Horacio Valenzuela, Bishop of Talca, Chile. (Note: Valenzuela was born on 5 April 1954 and ordained on 17 August 1985. He was named Auxiliary Bishop of Santiago de Chile on 11 March 1995 and consecrated on 7 May. He became Bishop of Talca on 12 December 1996.) (Note: Another bishop mentored by Karadima, Felipe Bacarreza Rodrígueza, Bishop of Los Angeles, Chile, dissociated himself from him many years earlier. Bacarreza was born on 10 June 1948 and ordained on 17 April 197. He was named Auxiliary Bishop of Concepción on 16 July 1991 and consecrated on 8 September. He became Bishop of Los Ángeles on 7 January 2006 1996.)

In March 2011, a few weeks after the Vatican's determination of Karadima's guilt was announced, Arteaga stepped down from his position at the Universidad Católica. The university's student union (Federación de Estudiantes de la UC) had urged his removal. A year earlier he had expressed complete support for Karadima. He only reluctantly expressed support for the Vatican action against Karadima, referring in his statement to those "affected" rather than "victims". Arteaga himself had been accused by José Andrés Murillo of ignoring his complaints and recommending a visit with a psychiatrist, "that it was all a misunderstanding of mine, that I should not continue saying those things about Karadima, they had very good lawyers". Arteaga remains an Auxiliary Bishop of Santiago de Chile, though by May 2018 he no longer played a public role because of health problems.

In 2018, Pope Francis accepted the resignations of Barros and Valenzuela. During the same year, however, it was reported that Errázuriz was the leader of the cover-up of Karadima's abuse. Of the four bishops who were accused of complicity when the accusations started, only Arteaga was named as a witness in a complaint which was filed against Errázuriz as well.

== Ongoing controversy ==
In 2013 and 2014, Ezzati and his predecessor Errazuriz coordinated their efforts to prevent Juan Carlos Cruz, one of Karadima's victims and accusers, from being appointed to the Pontifical Commission for the Protection of Minors. When their correspondence was made public in September 2015, advocates for victims of abuse called for Ezzati's resignation or removal. It was reported that Cruz, along with Jesse Hamilton and José Andrés Murillo, brought forth a lawsuit which forced the office of Santiago's Archbishop to pay all three men 450 million pesos (US$650,000) in damages. The Court of Appeals later denied the ruling took place and that the lawsuit was still ongoing; but it ruled in favor of the plaintiffs on March 27, 2019, and ordered the Archdiocese of Santiago to pay them 100 million pesos (about US$147,000) .

On March 28, 2019, it was announced that Errázuriz was named as a defendant in an ongoing investigation and had testified before prosecutors. On April 20, 2019, he was once again testified. During this testimony, Errázuriz spent 12 hours answering questions from lead sex abuse prosecutor Jorge Escobar, but remained silent at times and often replied "I don't remember." He also alleged that child molestation starts as "progress," followed by "psychological deformation" and then eventually a crime.

=== Evidence of sex abuse coverup ===
In 2018, a 2009 email which Errázuriz wrote to then Apostolic Nuncio to Chile Archbishop Giuseppe Pinto and which was made public during the lawsuit revealed Errázuriz's role in covering up growing allegations of sexual abuse against Karadima. "The presentation of the allegations to the promotor of justice normally calms the aggression of the accusers", Errázuriz wrote. "With respect to F. Karadima I didn't ask the promotor to interrogate him; I only asked Monsignor Andrés Arteaga for his opinion. He considered everything absolutely implausible. Since this was about facts that were time-barred [by the statute of limitations], I closed the investigation. That's how I chose to protect them, conscious that the way I acted, if the accusers at some point brought the case to the media, would turn against me". A complaint which was filed by Cruz, Murillo and Hamilton on October 25, 2018, named Errázuriz as the leader of the cover-up of sexual abuse committed by Karadima. The complaint also named Ezzati, Pinto, Arteaga and Chilean Minister of the Court of Appeals Juan Manuel Muñoz as witnesses. However, a sex abuse cover-up investigation was also launched against Diego Ossa, who was one Karadima's 40 personal priests.

== Barros appointment to Osorno ==
After the resolution of the case against Karadima, Barros, Koljatic and Valenzuela remained in their positions, though protests were raised against them and they were widely recognized as controversial figures. When Pope Francis appointed Barros Bishop of Osorno, Chile, a small diocese with 23 parishes, on 10 January 2015, Archbishop Ezzati, by now a cardinal, tried to have Francis withdraw the appointment. After several Chilean bishops questioned the appointment, Francis wrote privately to the leadership of the Episcopal Conference of Chile explaining that he understood the appointment would be controversial but that a plan to allow the bishops with ties to Karadima to take a sabbatical year to ease their reassignment had fallen through. Local protests and candlelight vigils and a petition to the papal nuncio on the part of 30 priests and deacons of the diocese were unsuccessful in blocking Barros' appointment, as was a letter signed by 51 members of the National Congress. The Vatican issued a rare. single-sentence statement defending Barro's appointment on 31 March. Protestors stormed the cathedral to disrupt Barros' installation there in March. It is customary for bishops to attend installation ceremonies; most of Chile's bishops did not. According to Francis, Barros later offered to resign on two occasions. Parishioners continued to protest Barros' appointment by withholding donations or leaving a church where he appeared. Other lay groups found themselves energized to fight what one called their "re-victimization" and to campaign for their voices to be heard in the selection of their bishop.

== Intervention of Pope Francis ==
While visiting Chile in from 15 to 18 January 2018, Pope Francis apologized for the "irreparable damage" caused by priests' abuse of minors. Victims of abuse rejected his apology and repeated their claims that bishops who protected abusers continue to hold positions in the church hierarchy in Chile. They objected especially to Francis allowing one of those bishops, Juan Barros, to celebrate mass alongside him. On 19 January, Francis defended Barros, saying: "The day someone brings me proof against Bishop Barros, then I will talk. But there is not one single piece of evidence. It is all slander. Is that clear?" Some Chilean bishops supported the pope and agreed the Church should focus on victims of abuse, while Benito Baranda, a prominent social activist who coordinated of the pope's visit to Chile, said Barros should be removed and that the pope's language "reignites the feeling of not being believed, or that they are exaggerating or being deceitful. It's like when children say they suffer abuse but no one believes them because they are children." The next day, while giving Francis credit for supporting many efforts to reduce and punish sexual abuse on the part of clergy, Cardinal Sean O'Malley criticized the pope's comments: "It is understandable that Pope Francis' statements yesterday in Santiago, Chile, were a source of great pain for survivors of sexual abuse by clergy or any other perpetrator. Words that convey the message 'if you cannot prove your claims then you will not be believed' abandon those who have suffered reprehensible criminal violations of their human dignity and relegate survivors to discredited exile."

During an airline flight from Santiago de Chile to Rome on 22 January 2018 Pope Francis spoke at length about the Karadima case and charges against Barros. He said he understood and appreciated O'Malley's statement, but repeated his assertion that he had not seen proof. He said that "No one has come forward, they haven't provided any evidence for a judgment." He said: "anyone who accuses without evidence, pertinaciously, this is slander". He said he thought negative responses to his remarks in Chile arose from his asking for "proof", which he realized is impossible, when he should have said "evidence." He said that "The Barros case was examined and reexamined, but there is no evidence. That is what I wanted to say. I don't have the evidence needed to convict. And if I were to convict without evidence and without moral certitude, I would myself commit the offense of judicial misconduct." Several members of the Pontifical Commission for the Protection of Minors later reported that they had presented O'Malley with an 8-page letter from Juan Carlos Cruz, one of Barros' accusers, and that O'Malley later assured them he had given it to Francis.

On 30 January, in response to continued public outcry, the Vatican announced that Francis was assigning Charles J. Scicluna, Archbishop of Malta to investigate the Barros case anew. Scicluna has been the Vatican's leading investigator in a number of high-profile sex abuse cases, including that of Marcial Maciel. He also holds an appointment in the Roman Curia that gives him responsibility for final appeals in clerical sex abuse cases. (Note: Scicluna is President of the College for the examination of appeals in matters of delicta graviora within the Congregation for the Doctrine of the Faith.)

Scicluna, assisted by Jordi Bertomeu from the Congregation for the Doctrine of the Faith, interviewed victims of sexual abuse and other witnesses in New York City on 17 February and then in Chile. He also received documents and the results of previous government investigations, and he met with a delegation from Osorno who opposed Barros continuing as their bishop. He also interviewed victims in cases unrelated to Barros. (Note: Scicluna interrupted his work in Chile to undergo gall bladder surgery on 21 February.) He completed his investigation on 28 February.

On 8 April, Francis sent a letter inviting the bishops of Chile to meet with him in Rome to consider Scicluna's report and help him in "discerning the measures that must be adopted in the short, medium and long term in order to restore ecclesial communion in Chile, in order to remedy the scandal to the extent possible, and re-establish justice." He wrote: "I have made serious mistakes in the assessment and my perception of the situation, especially due to a lack of truthful and balanced information." He said "I now beg the forgiveness of all those whom I have offended" and that he planned in the coming weeks to apologize in person to some of those Scicluna interviewed. Francis held private meetings with three of the key witnesses against Karadima and Barros at the Vatican on 28 and 29 April.

Following the pope's apology and endorsement of the accusations against Karadima's protégé bishops, two of them who had defended Karadima in 2010 when charges against him became public knowledge adopted a chastened tone. Valenzuela said resignations were not solutions but added: "we all have weaknesses, we all sin, we all behave more or less badly, we weren't attentive when bad things were happening, we lacked lucidity to be close to those who suffered, all that". Koljatic said: "Perhaps I wasn't lucid enough to understand what was happening [in El Bosque] and if this is so, evidently I must assume that responsibility."

Francis met several times with 34 bishops of Chile, all the active heads of dioceses plus 5 of 6 auxiliaries and some emeriti prelates, on 15 to 17 May 2018, accompanied by the Prefect of the Congregation for Bishops Marc Ouellet, and joined on the last day by Scicluna and Bertomeu. (Note: Auxiliary Bishop Andrés Arteaga was too sick to attend.) Francis greeted them with a 10-page diagnosis of the situation that took a broad view of the problem the Church faced in Chile, "the sexual abuse of minors, of the abuses of power, and of the abuses of conscience". He identified the bishops with "the psychology of the elite" that "ends by generating dynamics of division, separation, closed circles that result in a narcissistic and authoritarian spirituality" and warned that "Messianism, elitism and clericalism are all symptoms of this perversion in a way of being church." He said that some personnel changes were required and specific cases had to be addressed—he cited instances of witness intimidation, destruction of documents, the transfer of abusive priests without regard for the safety of minors—but he wanted them to focus on more fundamental questions, "the dynamics that made it possible for such attitudes and evils to occur". At the conclusion, all the active bishops and auxiliaries submitted their resignations in writing. As of 21 September 2018, Francis had accepted the resignations of 7 bishops, including Barros. Horacio Valenzuela, another Chilean Bishop linked to the Karadima scandal, would also have his resignation accepted by Pope Francis.

== Marist Brothers ==
On 12 September 2018, Pope Francis laicized priest Cristián Precht Bañados, who had been convicted of sexually abusing minors and adults. Precht gained national recognition in the 1980s when he served as head of the Church's Vicariate of Solidarity human rights group that challenged ex-dictator Augusto Pinochet to end the practice of torture in Chile. He had also been a frequent guest at facilities owned by the Catholic charity group the Marist Brothers, whom Chilean police have investigated following claims of sex abuse at many of the group's facilities. Precht had previously been suspended from ministry between 2012 and 2017 after being convicted by the Congregation for the Doctrine of the Faith as well. In 2012, Like Precht, Catholic priest Manuel Ortega was also found guilty of sexually molesting boys at Chilean Marist Brothers facilities. Ortega died in 2015. In 2017, the Chilean Marist Brothers revealed that at least 14 minors were abused by Marist Brother Abel Perez from the 1970s until 2000 at the Instituto Alonso de Ercilla and the Marcelino Champagnat schools in Chile. Perez confessed the alleged abuse to his superiors in 2010, and was then transferred to Peru.

== Laicization of Karadima ==
On September 28, 2018, Pope Francis issued a communique ordering Karadima's laicization.

== Archdiocese of Santiago lawsuit ==
On October 21, 2018, it was reported that Chile's Court of Appeal ordered the office of the Archbishop of Santiago to pay 450 million pesos ($650,000) to three men who stated that they were sexually abused by Karadima for decades. The ruling also stated that Errázuriz and Ezzati deliberately covered up Karadima's history of abuse as well. The 2009 email which Errázuriz wrote to Pinto was also used as evidence. One of the plaintiffs in this lawsuit was none other than Juan Carlos Cruz. Dobra Lusic, the President of the Court of Appeals, denied on October 22 that a ruling had taken place. On March 27, 2019, however the Court of Appeals ordered the Archdiocese to pay 100 million pesos (about US$147,000) for "moral damages" to each of the survivors: Juan Carlos Cruz, José Andrés Murillo and James Hamilton. The ruling was confirmed by their lawyer Juan Pablo Hermosilla and Santiago Bishop Celestino Aos on March 28.

== Resignation of Errázuriz From Council of Cardinals ==
On November 1, 2018, it was revealed that Cruz, Murillo and Hamilton had filed a complaint against Errázuriz on October 25 which accused him of perjury in the civil suit for compensation for damages filed against the Archdiocese of Santiago. On November 15, 2018, Errázuriz announced that he was no longer a member of the Council of Cardinals, which serves as the Pope's advisory committee, claiming that Pope Francis accepted his resignation after serving the Vatican's five-year term limit. However, it has been acknowledged that just as Errázuriz announced his resignation, a Chilean prosecutor announced that he had been summoned to testify.

== Resignation of Santiago Archbishop ==
On March 6, 2019, it was reported that a man filed a $500,000 lawsuit against Santiago Archbishop Ricardo Ezzati Andrello and the Archdiocese of Santiago claiming that in 2015 he had been raped in a bedroom attached to the cathedral and that Ezzati had bribed him to keep silent. On 23 March 2019, Pope Francis accepted Ezzati's resignation, presented when he turned 75.

== Removal of Statute of Limitations ==
On July 11, 2019, amid the ongoing sex abuse crisis in the Chilean Catholic Church, Chilean President Sebastián Piñera signed into law legislation which removes the statute of limitation on trying people for committing sex abuse crimes against children. However, the legislation, which was first proposed in 2010, is not retroactive.

== Society of Jesus ==
Rev. Stefan Dartmann disclosed that the same abusive teacher in Germany had been guilty of similar crimes in Jesuit schools in Chile and Spain.

In August 2019, revelations surfaced that Jesuit Father Renato Poblete, who died in 2010, had sexually abused 18 adult women and four underage female minors. He also impregnated at least one of these women and forced her to have an abortion. One of the minors he abused was only three years old and a daughter of one of his adult victims as well.

== Bernardino Piñera ==
On August 21, 2019, Chile's nuncio announced that the Vatican had launched an investigation into claims that Bernardino Piñera, an influential Chilean priest who is also a paternal uncle of Chilean President Sebastian Piñera, sexually abused at least one child 50 years prior. Piñera was also caught admitting that he had "impeccable behavior."

== Removal of Nuncio ==
On August 29, 2019, it was announced that Chilean nuncio and Italian Archbishop Ivo Scapolo had departed from his role in Chile and was transferred to Portugal. Scapolo earned criticism in Chile for his link to controversial Bishop appointments, including the appointment of Juan Barros Madrid. On August 30, the day following this announcement, Inés San Martín, the Rome Bureau Chief of the online Catholic news source Crux, described the Catholic Church in Chile as "hit hardest by the clerical abuse crisis outside the English-speaking world."

== Investigation of Diego Ossa ==
In January 2019, a Vatican opened a criminal investigation against Karadima's "right hand man" Diego Ossa, who was removed from ministry in August 2018 after being accused of two incidents of sex abuse and also covering-up sex abuse. Ossa faced three counts of sexual and power abuse, with two involving acts of and one involving a cover-up of incidents from 2005. Ossa, who served in the El Señor de Renca parish and was later named as vicar in a Ñuñoa parish, died in April 2020 of pancreatic cancer before a verdict could be reached in the Vatican. News of his death received mixed reaction from him complainants. By the time of his death, the Vatican investigation against Ossa also revealed an email between Cardinal Errázuriz and Ossa where Errázuriz agreed to transfer him settlement money so he could one of his complainants, Óscar Osbén.

== Other cases ==
Archdiocese of Santiago

- José Andrés Aguirre Ovalle, aka "Cura Tato", was found guilty of nine sexual abuse charges by the highest court of this country. In 2004 Aguirre was sentenced to 12 years in jail. At the beginning of this trial, the Catholic Church was sentenced to pay 50 million in damages to the victims, but then this sentence was revoked by the supreme court.
- Ricardo Muñoz Quinteros, priest of Melipilla, was charged in 2010 with eight cases of sexually abusing minors, including his own daughter. Quinteros is also being investigated for producing pronografic material involving children.

Diocese of Valparaíso

- Eduardo Olivares Martínez, was found guilty of a five sexual abuse against underprivileged minors. In 2006 he was sentenced to 3 years in jail and to pay 15 million pesos in damages.
- In 2010, Juan Henríquez Zapata was indicted for using minors for sex services.

Diocese of Rancagua

- Jorge Galaz Espinoza, former Director of El Pequeño Cottolengo, was found guilty of repeated violations against two mentally disabled minors. In 2005 Galaz was sentenced to 15 years in jail.

Diocese of Punta Arenas

- Jaime Low Cabezas, was found guilty of a sexual abuse against a 15-year-old minor. In 2009 Low was sentenced to three years in jail.
- Víctor Hugo Carrera, was found guilty of a sexual abuse against one underprivileged minor. In 2005 Carrera was sentenced to 541 days in jail and to pay 2 million pesos in damages to the family of the victim. The case implicated the Bishop of Punta Arenas, Tomás Osvaldo González Morales, who was accused of protecting Carrera and facilitating his escape to Bolivia, where he lived for two years.

Diocese of Iquique

- Marco Antonio Órdenes Fernández, bishop emeritus of Iquique, was laicized by Pope Francis on October 11, 2018, for accusations of sexual abuse against minors.

Archdiocese of La Serena

- Francisco José Cox Huneeus, archbishop emeritus of La Serena and member of the Institute of Schoenstatt Fathers, was laicized by Pope Francis on October 11, 2018, for accusations of sexual abuse against minors. Cox, who had been forced to resign Archbishop of La Serana in 1997 and later returned to Chile after living in Germany between 2002 and 2019, died on August 12, 2020, while awaiting trial.
