= Juan Barros Madrid =

Chilean prelate (born 1956)

His Excellency, The Most Reverend Juan Barros Madrid
- Bishop Emeritus of Osorno
- Church: Latin Church
- Archdiocese: Puerto Montt
- Diocese: Osorno
- Appointed: 10 January 2015
- Installed: 21 March 2015
- Term ended: 11 June 2018
- Predecessor: René Osvaldo Rebolledo Salinas
- Previous posts: Military Ordinary of Chile, Bishop of Iquique, Auxiliary Bishop of Valparaíso

Orders
- Ordination: 29 June 1984 by Juan Francisco Fresno
- Consecration: 29 June 1995 by Jorge Medina, Juan Francisco Fresno, Horacio del Carmen Valenzuela Abarca

Personal details
- Born: July 15, 1956 (age 70) Santiago de Chile
- Motto: Fiat Voluntas tua

Juan de la Cruz Barros Madrid (born 15 July 1956) is a Chilean prelate of the Latin Church. He was Bishop of Osorno from 2015 to 2018. He was Auxiliary Bishop of Valparaíso from 1995 to 2000, Bishop of Iquique from 2000 to 2004, and Military Ordinary of Chile from 2004 to 2015.

He took up his position in Osorno amid controversy and protests over his close relationship with Fernando Karadima, whom the Church has found guilty of the sexual abuse of minors. Juan Barros resigned from his bishopric in 2018 amid the growing sexual abuse cases involving Catholic priests in Chile.

== Early years ==
Juan Barros was born on 15 July 1956 in Santiago de Chile. He studied at College St. Ignatius El Bosque, and joined the Union of the Sacred Heart led by Karadima. After studying economics and administration at the Pontifical Catholic University of Chile, he entered the major seminary of the Archdiocese of Santiago de Chile where he studied philosophy and theology.

Beginning in 1983 he served as private secretary to the Archbishop of Santiago, Juan Francisco Fresno, and was later accused while in that position of protecting Karadima from charges of sexual abuse. In 1984 a group of parishioners reported "improper conduct" by ear Karadima to Juan Francisco Fresno, Archbishop of Santiago de Chile. (Note: Fresno became a cardinal in 1985.) One of them later told a court that he learned that their letter was "torn up and thrown away".

He was ordained a priest on 29 June 1984 and then performed parish work while also working for the Episcopal Conference of Chile. He earned a licentiate in theology from the Pontifical Catholic University of Chile in 1994.

On 22 April 1990, he became pastor of Our Lady of Peace parish in Ñuñoa and on 21 March 1993 became pastor of San Gabriel in the Pudahuel. In May 1993 he was appointed Director of the Ecclesiastical Area of the Episcopal Conference of Chile.

Pope John Paul II named him Titular Bishop Bilta and Auxiliary Bishop of Valparaíso on 12 April 1995 and he was consecrated a bishop in Valparaíso Cathedral on 29 June. He chose as his episcopal motto "Fiat Voluntas tua" (Your will be done). John Paul named him Bishop of Iquique on 21 November 2000 and he was installed there on 27 December.

On 9 October 2004 John Paul named him Bishop of the Military Ordinariate of Chile, and he took office on 26 November, when he was also invested as Brigadier General of the Army of Chile.

== Bishop of Osorno ==
Pope Francis named him Bishop of Osorno on 10 January 2015. Cardinal Ricardo Ezzati, Archbishop of Santiago de Chile, tried to have Francis withdraw the appointment. Barros was criticized for his connection to Fr Fernando Karadima, who had been accused by multiple people of sexual misconduct. Some alleged victims claimed that Barros was present during Karadima's sexual acts, with one even saying that he participated in them.

After several Chilean bishops questioned the appointment, Francis wrote privately to the leadership of the Episcopal Conference of Chile explaining that he understood the appointment would be controversial but that a plan to allow the bishops with ties to Karadima to take a sabbatical year to ease their reassignment had fallen through. Local protests and candlelight vigils and a petition to the papal nuncio on the part of 30 of the 41 priests of the diocese and deacons of the diocese were unsuccessful in blocking Barros' appointment, as was a letter signed by 51 members of the National Congress.

The Vatican issued a rare statement defending Barro's appointment on 31 March, just a single sentence. Protestors stormed the cathedral to disrupt Barros' installation there in March. Most of Chile's bishops did not attend the installation ceremony as is customary. According to Francis, Barros later offered to resign on two occasions. Parishioners continued to protest Barros' appointment by withholding donations or leaving a church where he appeared. Other lay groups found themselves energized to fight what one called their "revictimization" and to campaign for their voices to be heard in the selection of their bishop.

While visiting Chile in from 15 to 18 January 2018, Pope Francis apologized for the "irreparable damage" caused by priests' abuse of minors. Victims of abuse rejected his apology and repeated their claims that bishops who protected abusers continue to hold positions in the church hierarchy in Chile. They objected especially to Francis allowing Juan Barros to celebrate mass alongside him. On 19 January, Francis defended Barros, saying: "The day someone brings me proof against Bishop Barros, then I will talk. But there is not one single piece of evidence. It is all slander. Is that clear?"

Some Chilean bishops supported the pope and agreed the Church should focus on victims of abuse, while Benito Baranda, a prominent social activist who coordinated protests of the pope's visit to Chile, said Barros should be removed and that the pope's language "reignites the feeling of not being believed, or that they are exaggerating or being deceitful." The next day, while giving Francis credit for supporting many efforts to reduce and punish sexual abuse on the part of clergy, Cardinal Seán Patrick O'Malley criticized the pope's comments as "a source of great pain for survivors of sexual abuse by clergy or any other perpetrator".

On 22 January 2018 Pope Francis spoke at length about the charges against Barros. He said that "the Barros case was examined and reexamined, but there is no evidence. That is what I wanted to say. I don't have the evidence needed to convict." Several members of the Pontifical Commission for the Protection of Minors later reported that they had presented O'Malley with an 8-page letter from Juan Carlos Cruz, one of Barros' accusers, and that O'Malley later assured them he had given it to Francis. This contradicted Francis's earlier claims that he had not heard statements from any victims. "You, in all good will, tell me that there are victims, but I haven't seen any, because they haven't come forward," he had previously said.

On 30 January, in response to continued public outcry, the Vatican announced that Francis was assigning Charles J. Scicluna, Archbishop of Malta to investigate the Barros case anew. Scicluna had been the Vatican's leading investigator in a number of high-profile sex abuse cases, including that of Marcial Maciel. (Note: Scicluna is also President of the College for the examination of appeals in matters of delicta graviora within the Congregation for the Doctrine of the Faith, which gives him responsibility for final appeals in clerical sex abuse cases.) Scicluna did not restrict his investigation to the Barros case. In February, assisted by Jordi Bertomeu from the Congregation for the Doctrine of the Faith, he conducted interviews with victims of sexual abuse and other witnesses, received documents and the results of previous government investigations, and met with a delegation from Osorno who opposed Barros continuing as their bishop. On 8 April, Francis sent a letter inviting the bishops of Chile to meet with him in Rome to consider Scicluna's report and help him decide how to reform the Church in Chile. He admitted he had "made serious mistakes in the assessment and my perception of the situation" and wrote: "I now beg the forgiveness of all those whom I have offended".

When Francis met with 34 Chilean bishops in May, he made them focus on the roots of the sex abuse scandal in elitist attitudes and the Church's loss of missionary spirit. He asked for deeper reform and though he promised changes of personnel the Karadima and Barros cases were seen as symptoms of far greater problems. At the conclusion, all the active bishops and auxiliaries submitted their resignations in writing.

Pope Francis accepted Barros' resignation on 11 June 2018 over the growing Catholic Church sexual abuse cases in Chile.

== See also ==
- Catholic Church in Chile
- Catholic sexual abuse cases in Chile

== Notes ==
Catholic Church titles
| Preceded by Enrique Troncoso Troncoso | Bishop of Iquique; 2000–2004 | Succeeded by Marco Antonio Órdenes Fernández |
| Preceded by Pablo Lizama Riquelme | Military Ordinary of Chile; 2004–2015 | Succeeded by Santiago Jaime Silva Retamales |
| Preceded by René Osvaldo Rebolledo Salinas | Bishop of Osorno; 2015–present | Incumbent |
