= Celestino Aós Braco =

Roman Catholic cardinal

His Eminence Celestino Aós Braco OFMCap
- Cardinal; Metropolitan Archbishop Emeritus of Santiago de Chile
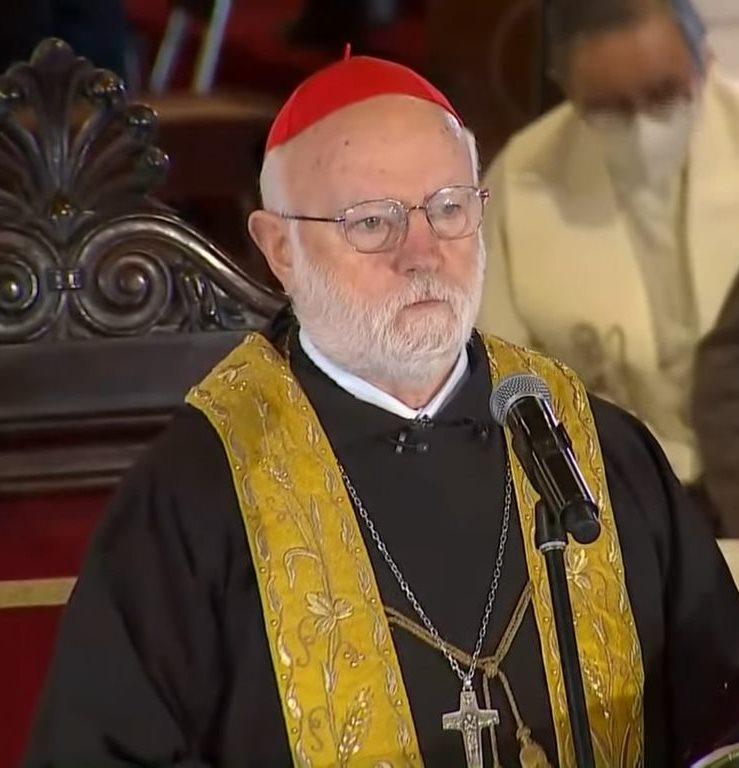
- Aós in 2021
- Church: Catholic Church
- Archdiocese: Santiago
- See: Santiago
- Appointed: 27 December 2019
- Installed: 11 January 2020
- Term ended: 25 October 2023
- Predecessor: Ricardo Ezzati Andrello
- Successor: Fernando Chomalí Garib
- Other posts: Cardinal-Priest of Santi Nereo e Achilleo (2020–); President of the Chilean Episcopal Conference (2021-)
- Previous posts: Bishop of Copiapó (2014–19); Apostolic Administrator of Santiago de Chile (2019)

Orders
- Ordination: 30 March 1968 by Ignacio Larrañaga Lasa
- Consecration: 18 October 2014 by Ivo Scapolo
- Created cardinal: 28 November 2020 by Pope Francis
- Rank: Cardinal-Priest

Personal details
- Born: 6 April 1945 (age 81) Artaiz, Unciti, Navarra, Spain
- Education: University of Barcelona; University of Zaragoza
- Motto: Amar y servir ("To love and to serve")
- Coat of arms

Celestino Aós Braco OFMCap (born 6 April 1945) is a Spanish prelate of the Catholic Church who served as Metropolitan Archbishop of Santiago in Chile from 2019 to 2023, after being apostolic administrator there for nine months. He was previously Bishop of Copiapó in Chile from 2014 to 2019. He was made a cardinal in 2020.

A member of the Capuchins (Order of Friars Minor Capuchin), he has worked in Chile since 1983.

== Biography ==
Aós Braco was born in Artaiz (Unciti) in the province of Navarra, Spain, on 6 April 1945. He studied philosophy in Zaragoza and theology in Pamplona. He took his initial vows as a Capuchin on 15 August 1964 at Sangüesa and his final vows on 16 September 1967 in Pamplona. He received his priestly ordination on 30 March 1968. He then fulfilled assignments in Spain as professor in Lecaroz–Navarra and vicar in Tudela.

He earned his licentiate in psychology at the University of Barcelona in 1980. In 1980-1981, he held a fellowship that allowed him to conduct psychological research at the Pontifical Catholic University of Chile. Returning to Spain he was professor in Pamplona and vicar in Zaragoza. He was transferred to Chile in 1983 where he was appointed parochial vicar in Longaví, diocese of Linares. Two years later, he was elected superior of the Capuchin community in Los Ángeles and subsequently he was transferred to Recreo (Viña del Mar), becoming the episcopal vicar for the consecrated life of the Diocese of Valparaíso. Other responsibilities included economic provincial of the Capuchins in Chile, Promotor of Justice of the ecclesiastical tribunal of Valparaíso, judge of the ecclesiastical tribunal of Concepción, and treasurer of the Chilean association of canon law.

In 2007, while promoter of justice in Valparaiso, he heard but judged "implausible" a complaint of sexual abuse made by a former seminarian against a former rector of the seminary, and the seminarian did not file a formal complaint to press the issue.

Pope Francis named him Bishop of Copiapó on 25 July 2014, and he received his episcopal ordination on 18 October from the apostolic nuncio to Chile, Ivo Scapolo.

On 23 March 2019, Francis gave him the additional position of Apostolic Administrator of Santiago, and Aós took up his responsibilities at a Mass there the next day.

On 18 April 2019, Aós Braco refused communion to at least two people who knelt to receive it, though norms allow communicants to stand or kneel. A week later he distributed Communion to people kneeling. In mid-May he told an interviewer:

Communion is not simply a union with God but with the community. There is a Spanish saying that says: 'Where you are going, do whatever you see.' If I go to a place where everyone receives communion on their knees, I do so too. And if everyone goes to communion standing up, this is normal too. A week later, as I celebrated Mass in the Sanctuary of Mercy, there were some who received communion on their feet, others on their knees, it was given to all. I believe that Jesus Christ is in the Holy Host, whether I'm standing or kneeling. At that time there was a reaction, some said I humiliated [these people] by asking them to get up. If they felt humiliated, I ask forgiveness, it was not the intent. But despite this incident, I'm calm.

On 27 December 2019, Pope Francis named him Archbishop of Santiago. At Aós Braco's installation as archbishop on 11 January 2020 a small group of protestors lit gas canisters in the cathedral as part of the ongoing anti-government protests, targeting him as "the highest Catholic authority in the country for his silence and complicity with the government".

On 25 October 2020, Pope Francis announced he would raise him to the rank of cardinal at a consistory scheduled for 28 November 2020. At that consistory, Pope France made him Cardinal-Priest of Santi Nereo e Achilleo. On 16 December he was named a member of the Pontifical Commission for Latin America.

Pope Francis accepted his resignation as archbishop on 25 October 2023.

== See also ==
- Cardinals created by Pope Francis

Catholic Church titles
Preceded by Kizito Bahujimihigo	Bishop of Copiapó; 25 July 2014 – 23 March 2019	Succeeded by Ricardo Basilio Morales Galindo
Preceded by Ricardo Ezzati Andrello	Archbishop of Santiago; 27 December 2019 – 25 October 2023	Succeeded by Fernando Chomalí Garib
Preceded by Theodore Edgar McCarrick	Cardinal-Priest of Santi Nereo e Achilleo; 28 November 2020 –	Incumbent
Preceded by Santiago Jaime Silva Retamales	President of the Chilean Episcopal Conference; 28 July 2021 –	Incumbent
