= Military Cathedral of Our Lady of Mount Carmel, Santiago =

Coordinates: 33.4204°S 70.6062°W

Military Cathedral of Our Lady of Mount Carmel
- Catedral Castrense de Nuestra Señora del Carmen
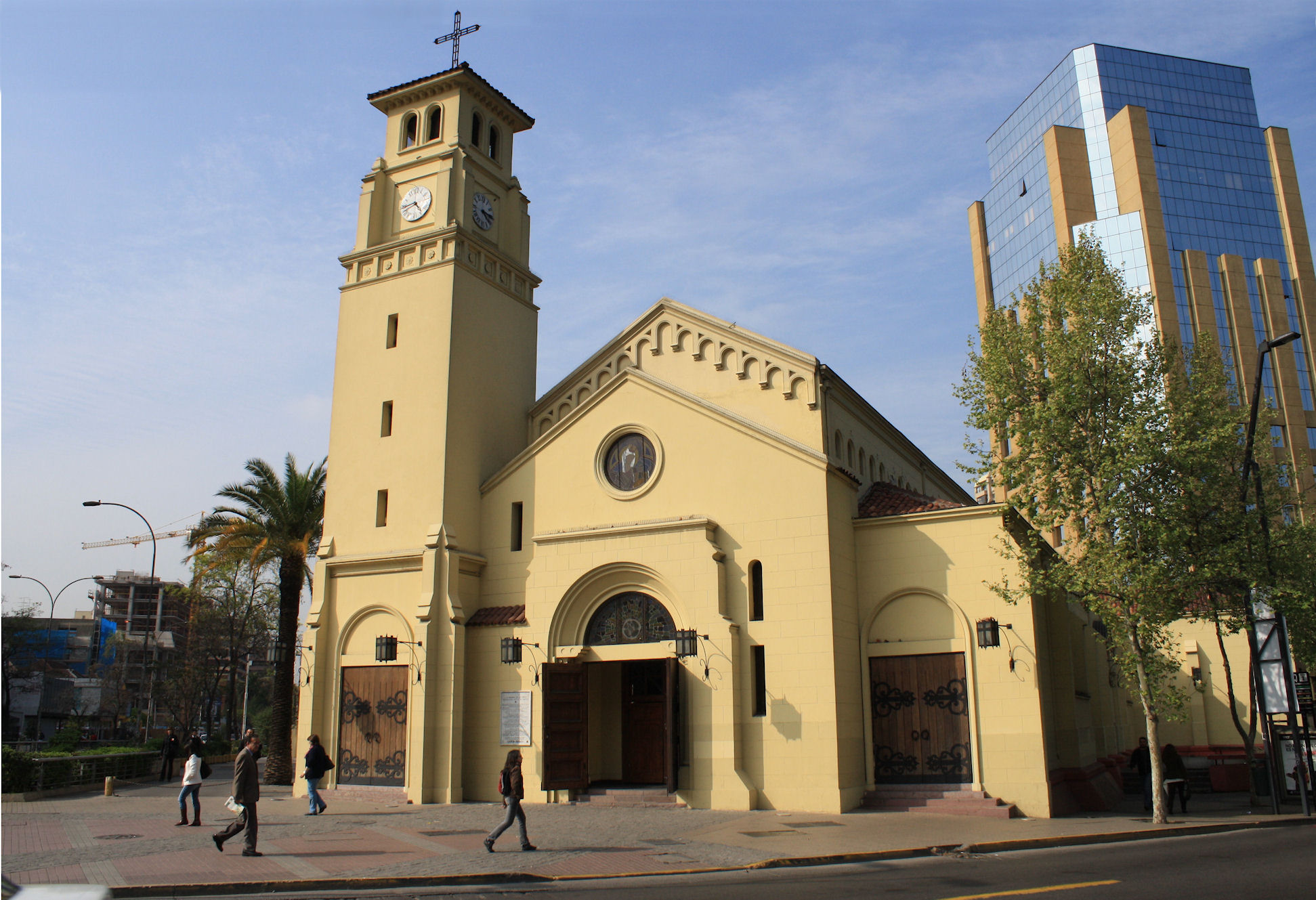
- Military Cathedral of Our Lady of Mount Carmel
- Location: Santiago
- Country: Chile
- Denomination: Roman Catholic Church

History
- Status: Cathedral
- Consecrated: December 27, 1994

Administration
- Diocese: Military Bishopric of Chile

The Military Cathedral of Our Lady of Mount Carmel (also Military Cathedral of Santiago; Spanish: Catedral Castrense de Nuestra Señora del Carmen) is a Catholic church which functions as the episcopal seat of the Military Bishopric of Chile. It is located on Avenida Los Leones in the commune of Providencia, in Santiago, the capital of Chile.

The church is dedicated to the religious services of the Chilean Armed Forces and Carabineros, but it is also open to the rest of the community. As of December 2025 the current rector of the cathedral is the military chaplain Jaime Casals Cirer.

During the nineteenth century it was the chapel of Lo Bravo, which after 1900 became the Parish of St. Ramon. The cathedral was blessed on March 17, 1986, and was consecrated on December 27, 1994, the feast of St. John the Evangelist.

== See also ==
- Roman Catholicism in Chile
- Military Ordinariate of Chile
