= Karadima case =

Case of sexual abuse in the Catholic Church

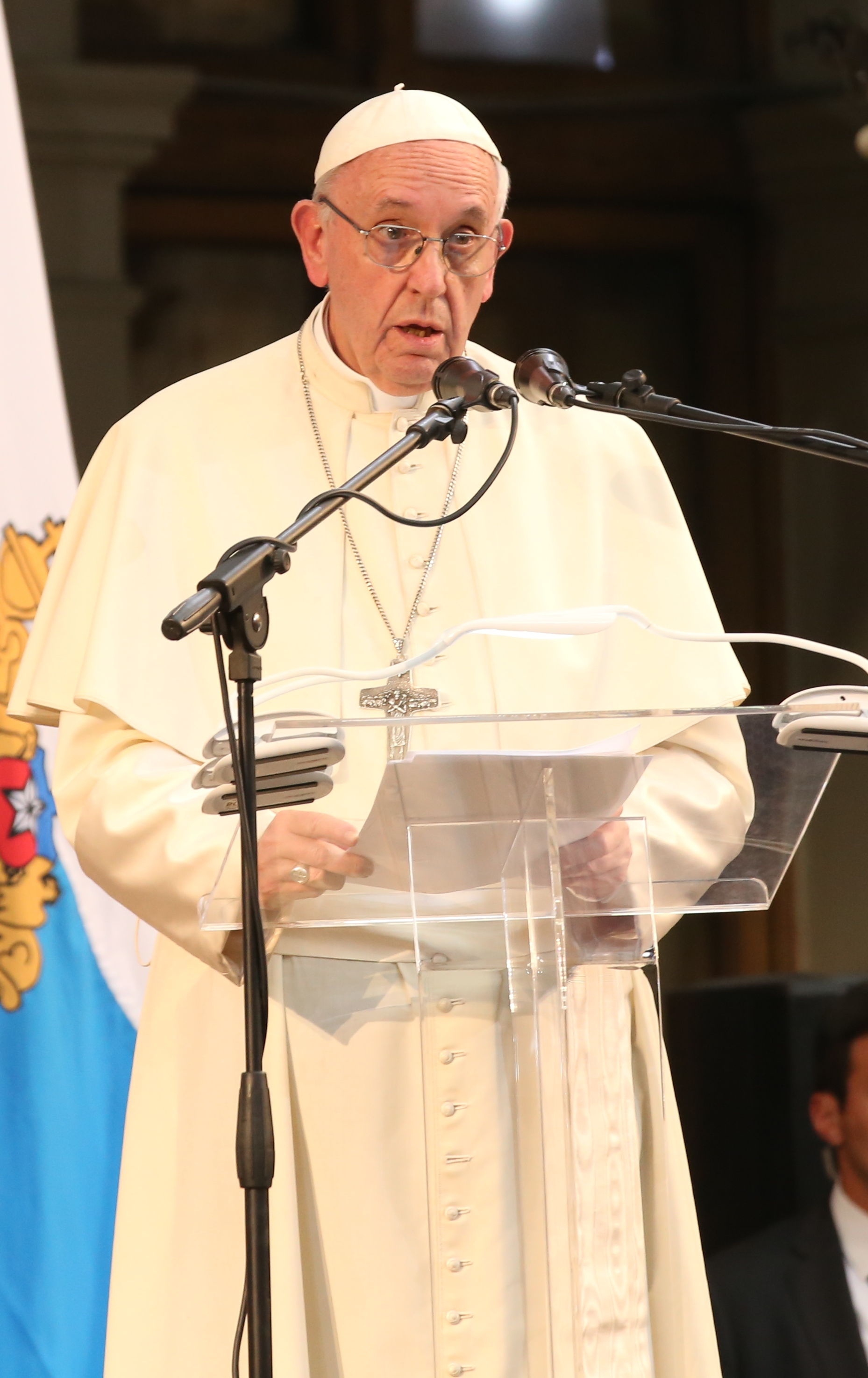
Pope Francis making a speech in the Pontifical Catholic University of Chile (2018)

The case of Fernando Karadima concerned the sexual abuse of minors in Chile, which became public in 2010. It raised questions about the responsibility and complicity of several Chilean bishops, including some of the country's highest-ranking Catholic prelates. By 2018, it attracted worldwide attention.

Fernando Karadima had been influential in the spiritual formation and careers of dozens of priests and several bishops. Karadima's accusers charged those bishops and other high-ranking prelates had failed to investigate their claims of sexual abuse and had endangered the minors in their care. When the Vatican found Karadima guilty, one of the bishops associated with him, Andrés Arteaga, resigned from his position as Vice-Chancellor of the Universidad Católica de Chile. Two others remained as heads of their dioceses, positions they had held since 1996 in one case and 2003 in the other. In 2015, the attempt to install the fourth, Juan Barros Madrid, as Bishop of Osorno, became a multi-year battle, first confined to Chile, but eventually drawing the attention of the Vatican and worldwide media coverage.

== Biography ==
Fernando Karadima (born 6 August 1930 – died 26 July 2021), was a Chilean Catholic priest, and was accused as early as 1984 of sexually abusing adolescent boys. Years later, when a church investigator found the accusers credible, his superior, the Archbishop of Santiago de Chile, took no action against him. Karadima's accusers made their charges public in 2010. The Catholic Church in Chile completed a thorough investigation of the charges that year, and in February 2011 the Vatican found Karadima guilty of sexually abusing minors and psychological abuse. It forced him into retirement, relocated him away from contact with former parishioners and followers, and denied him the right to function as a priest for the rest of his life. Civil legal action against him was thwarted by the statute of limitations.

== First accusations ==
Fernando Karadima was a spiritual leader and father figure for young men from Santiago's social elite. He was based in the "Parroquia El Bosque", which serves some of Santiago's wealthiest and most influential families. His connections extended to officials in the military dictatorship of Augusto Pinochet and to the papal nuncio to Chile, Angelo Sodano, who became a cardinal and Vatican Secretary of State in 1991. Karadima was a dynamic leader, described as "Impeccably dressed and with perfectly groomed nails and slicked-back hair", who "cut an aristocratic figure, appealing to both young and old in Chile's elite." He trained 50 priests and several bishops.

In 1984 a group of parishioners reported "improper conduct" on the part of Karadima to Juan Francisco Fresno, Archbishop of Santiago de Chile. (Note: Fresno became a cardinal in 1985.) One of them later told a court that he learned that their letter was "torn up and thrown away". Fresno's secretary at the time was one of Karadima's protégés, Juan Barros.

In mid-2003, a young Catholic, José Murillo, informed Cardinal Francisco Javier Errázuriz Ossa, the new Archbishop of Santiago de Chile, by letter that he had been abused by Karadima. The Episcopal Conference of Chile had established guidelines for handling accusations of sexual abuse by clergy months earlier, and the guidelines called for an investigation if the accuser demonstrates "good faith" and did not require an assessment of the accusation itself. Errázuriz told Murillo he was praying for him and in June 2004 he opened the first investigation into Karadima. Two years later, the investigator told Errázuriz that he found the accusers credible, and suggested certain courses of action. Errázuriz rejected the report. He explained years later in an interview with the magazine Qué Pasa that he mistakenly relied on someone else's assessment: "I made a mistake: I asked and overvalued the opinion of a person very close to the accused and the accuser. While the promoter of justice thought that the accusation was plausible, this other person affirmed just the opposite."

== Investigations ==
In April 2010 four men once-devoted followers of Karadima filed a criminal complaint. The Public Ministry appointed Xavier Armendáriz as special prosecutor and he promised an unbiased investigation.

Reverend Hans Kast testified that he had witnessed sexual abuse, as did the Reverend Andrés Ferrada "but no one ever did anything about it". Reverend Francisco Walker, president of the Ecclesiastical Tribunal, resigned from the court after admitting he had leaked the claimants' personal information to Bishop Arteaga and Father Morales.

After seven months of investigation, the court dismissed the lawsuit, ruling that there was not enough evidence to charge Karadima. One claimant said: "We would have liked to appeal, but with defence attorneys like this, who have the Appeals and Supreme Court eating out of their hands, and a number of powerful people who continue to protect Karadima, we knew it would be an uphill battle that we were likely to lose". (Note: Karadima's defense attorney, Juan Pablo Bulnes Cerda, is the brother of Juan Luis Bulnes Cerda, who was sentenced in 1970 for assassinating General René Schneider in an attempt to prevent the inauguration of Salvador Allende. Bulnes Cerda works for the law office of Ossa, Bulnes & Asociados. Juan Luis Ossa Bulnes was chief of the "Comando Rolando Matus", a paramilitary arm of the National Party, which played a key role in the destabilization of the country when Allende was in power. Luis Arévalo and Luis Ortiz Quiroga, who also appeared for Karadima, were attorneys in the 1970s for Julio Bouchon, another participant in the Schneider assassination. They worked also for Colonia Dignidad. According to James Hamilton, one of those claiming abuse by Karadima, Karadima protected and hid Juan Luis Bulnes Cerda when he was wanted by the Chilean police in 1970.)

In response to the public accusations, Chilean church officials conducted their own investigation and in June 2010 submitted a 700-page report to the Congregation for the Doctrine of the Faith (CDF). While that report was under consideration, Pope Benedict XVI accepted the resignation of Errázuriz and named Ricardo Ezzati Andrello to succeed him as Archbishop of Santiago de Chile. On 16 January 2011 the CDF found Karadima guilty of abusing minors and sentenced him to a life of "prayer and penance", which the Vatican described as "a lifelong prohibition from the public exercise of any ministerial act, particularly confession and the spiritual guidance of any category of persons". His forced retirement included relocation to a place where he will not have contact with previous parishioners or anyone he mentored. On 18 February, Archbishop Ezzati made the decision public. Karadima continued to maintain his innocence. Ezzati announced on 22 June that the CDF had rejected Karadima's appeal and confirmed its original judgment. Ezzati said "there is no place in the priesthood for those who abuse minors and this confirms the vision of the Church in this case. Karadima acknowledged the judgment with his signature but said Ezzati's "inner convictions are personal". At the time Karadima was living in Providencia in a religious convent.

One of Chile's highest-ranking prelates, long-retired Cardinal Jorge Medina, expressed doubts that Karadima could be properly convicted of "sexual abuse" because "A 17-year-old youngster knows what he is doing." He defended the canonical sanctions imposed on Karadima, given his age and merits. One of Karadima's accusers called the cardinal's remark about 17-year-olds "an unwarranted attack". Another said he regarded Medina's statements as "extremely suspicious, as if he wanted to diminish the outline of these grave actions, reducing the issue to homosexuality in a very silly manner, as if, furthermore, homosexuality and abuse were synonymous". The statements, he said, "were an attempt to free from responsibility someone who took advantage of his position of power over more vulnerable persons".

== Later developments ==
The four bishops who were accused of complicity with Karadima, and their posts when the charges against Karadima became public, were:

- Andrés Arteaga, Auxiliary Bishop of Santiago de Chile and Vice-Chancellor of the Universidad Católica de Chile; (Note: Arteaga was born on 17 January 1959 and ordained on 31 May 1986. He was named Auxiliary Bishop of Santiago de Chile on 10 July 2001 and consecrated on 19 August. In 2000, Cardinal Francisco Javier Errázuriz Ossa, Archbishop of Santiago, named him Vice-Chancellor of the Universidad Católica de Chile. He resigned that post in March 2011.)
- Juan Barros Madrid, Military Bishop of Chile; (Note: Barros was born on 15 July 1956 and ordained on 29 June 1984. He was named Auxiliary Bishop of Valparaíso on 12 April 1995 and consecrated on 29 June. He became Bishop of Iquique on 21 November 2000, Military Ordinary of Chile on 9 October 2004, and Bishop of Osorno on 10 January 2015.)
- Tomislav Koljatic Maroevic, Bishop of Linares, Chile; (Note: Koljatic was born on 19 September 1955 and ordained on 14 August 1987. He was named Auxiliary Bishop of Concepción on 27 November 1997 and consecrated on 6 January 1998. He became Bishop of Linares on 17 January 2003.)
- Horacio Valenzuela, Bishop of Talca, Chile. (Note: Valenzuela was born on 5 April 1954 and ordained on 17 August 1985. He was named Auxiliary Bishop of Santiago de Chile on 11 March 1995 and consecrated on 7 May. He became Bishop of Talca on 12 December 1996.) (Note: Another bishop mentored by Karadima, Felipe Bacarreza Rodrígueza, Bishop of Los Angeles, Chile, dissociated himself from him many years earlier. Bacarreza was born on 10 June 1948 and ordained on 17 April 1977. He was named Auxiliary Bishop of Concepción on 16 July 1991 and consecrated on 8 September. He became Bishop of Los Ángeles on 7 January 2006 1996.)

Bishop Arteaga stepped down from his position at the Universidad Catolica in March 2011. The university's student union (Federación de Estudiantes de la UC) had urged his removal. A year earlier he had expressed complete support for Karadima. He only reluctantly expressed support for the Vatican action against Karadima, referring in his statement to those "affected" rather than "victims". Arteaga himself had been accused by José Andrés Murillo of ignoring his complaints and recommending a visit with a psychiatrist, "that it was all a misunderstanding of mine, that I should not continue saying those things about Karadima, they had very good lawyers". He remains an Auxiliary Bishop of Santiago de Chile, though by May 2018 he no longer played a public role because of health problems.

In 2013 and 2014, Ezzati and his predecessor Errázuriz coordinated their efforts to prevent Juan Carlos Cruz, one of Karadima's victims and accusers, from being appointed to the Pontifical Commission for the Protection of Minors. When their correspondence was made public in September 2015, advocates for victims of abuse called for Ezzati's resignation or removal.

Pope Francis appointed Barros Bishop of Osorno, Chile, a small diocese with 23 parishes, on 10 January 2015. Local protests and candlelight vigils and a petition to the papal nuncio on the part of 30 priests and deacons of the diocese were unsuccessful in blocking Barros' appointment, as was a letter signed by 51 members of the National Congress. In 2018 Francis ordered a new investigation, and in April a 2,300-page report provided all the evidence he needed to remove Barros—and to recognize that he had been given bad advice on the case. Francis reversed his position, apologizing to victims of abuse, and undertaking a wholesale review of the Church in Chile.

When Francis met with 34 Chilean bishops in May 2018, he asked the bishops to review the state of the Church and the root causes of the crisis. The Karadima case and that of the bishops associated with him were seen as part of a broader corrupt and self-serving culture. Francis described the need to deepen their review to "the sexual abuse of minors, of the abuses of power, and of the abuses of conscience". He identified the bishops with "the psychology of the elite" that "ends by generating dynamics of division, separation, closed circles that result in a narcissistic and authoritarian spirituality" and warned that "Messianism, elitism and clericalism are all symptoms of this perversion in a way of being church." At the conclusion, all the active bishops and auxiliaries submitted their resignations in writing. Barros's and Valenzuela's were among the resignations which Pope Francis accepted.

By July 2018, Arteaga and Maroevic, whose resignations were not yet accepted, were not listed on Bishop-Accountability.org as being accused of any cover-up. However, Errázuriz still was listed.

In 2018, a 2009 email which Errázuriz wrote to then-Apostolic Nuncio to Chile, Archbishop Giuseppe Pinto, and which was made public during the lawsuit, revealed Errázuriz's role in covering up growing allegations of sexual abuse against Karadima. "The presentation of the allegations to the promotor of justice normally calms the aggression of the accusers," Errázuriz wrote. "With respect to F. Karadima I didn’t ask the promotor to interrogate him; I only asked Monsignor Andrés Arteaga for his opinion. He considered everything absolutely implausible. Since this was about facts that had prescribed [past the statute of limitations], I closed the investigation. That’s how I chose to protect them, conscious that the way I acted, if the accusers at some point brought the case to the media, it would turn against me."

A complaint which was filed on October 25, 2018, by three victims of Karadima named Errázuriz as the leader of the coverup of acts of sexual abuse committed by the former priest. The complaint also named Ezzati, Pinto, Arteaga, and Chilean Minister of the Court of Appeals Juan Manuel Muñoz as witnesses to it as well.

== Assessments ==
Antonio Delfau, a Jesuit priest in Santiago, said in 2011 that the Vatican decision on Karadima's guilt "is going to mark a before and after in the way the Chilean Catholic Church proceeds in cases like these, or at least it should", and "From now on, every case of sexual abuse must be treated with meticulous care and not be based on the gut feeling of a given church official." Chilean political analyst Ascanio Cavallo, Dean of the Journalism School of the Adolfo Ibáñez University, called the Karadima case "the worst scandal of the Chilean Catholic Church". He said: "The abuses were not possible without a network of political, social and religious power working for 50 years. The assassination of René Schneider ... bears traces of the network". He said that "Karadima built a parallel church in the 1980s and 1990s to satisfy a very specific sector of Santiago's society. This para-church [paraiglesia] was the platform of the prevailing positions that damaged the prestige of the institution since 2000".

== Laicization of Karadima ==
On 28 September 2018, Pope Francis laicized Karadima. It is believed that he lived in a care home in Santiago.

== Archdiocese of Santiago lawsuit ==
On 21 October 2018, it was reported that Chile's Court of Appeal ordered the office of Santiago's Archbishop to pay 450 million pesos ($650,000) to three men who stated that Karadima sexually abused them for decades. The three claimants in this lawsuit against the Archdiocese were James Hamilton, José Andrés Murillo and Juan Carlos Cruz, who was one of Karadima's most high-profile victims. Dobra Lusic, the President of the Court of Appeals, stated on October 22 that the lawsuit was still ongoing and that no verdict has been reached. On 27 March 2019, the Court of Appeals ordered the Archdiocese to pay 100 million pesos (about US$147,000) for "moral damages" to each of the survivors: Juan Carlos Cruz, José Andrés Murillo and James Hamilton. The ruling was confirmed by their lawyer Juan Pablo Hermosilla and Santiago Bishop Celestino Aos on March 28. It was announced that Errázuriz was named as a defendant in an ongoing investigation and had testified before prosecutors.

== Errázuriz Resignation From Council of Cardinals ==
On 1 November 2018, it was revealed that Cruz, Hamilton and Murillo had filed a complaint against Errázuriz on October 25 which accused him of perjury in the civil suit for compensation for damages filed against the Archdiocese of Santiago. On 15 November 2018, Errázuriz announced that he was no longer a member of the Council of Cardinals, which serves as the Pope's advisory committee, claiming that Pope Francis accepted his resignation after serving the Vatican's five-year term limit. However, it has been acknowledged that just as Errázuriz announced his resignation, a Chilean prosecutor announced that he had been summoned to testify.

== Investigation of Diego Ossa ==
In January 2019, the Vatican opened a criminal investigation against Karadima's "right-hand man" Diego Ossa, removed from ministry in August 2018 after being accused of committing two acts of sex abuse and covering up acts of sex abuse committed in 2005. Ossa faced three counts of sexual and power abuse. Ossa, who served in the El Señor de Renca parish and was later named as vicar in a Ñuñoa parish, died in April 2020 of pancreatic cancer before a verdict could be reached in the Vatican. News of his death received mixed reaction from his complainants. By the time of his death, the Vatican investigation against Ossa also revealed an email between Cardinal Errázuriz and Ossa where Errázuriz agreed to transfer to him settlement money so he could pay off one of his complainants, Óscar Osbén. On 16 April 2020, the Congregation for the Doctrine of the Faith posthumously found Ossa guilty of sexual abuse and of abuse of conscience of another of his followers and in death, gave him a symbolic sentence of five years of deprivation of all ecclesiastical office.

== See also ==
- Catholic sexual abuse cases in Chile
