= Diocese of Valparaíso =

Diocese of Valparaíso may refer to the following ecclesiastical jurisdictions in Chile:

- Diocese of Valparaíso (Catholic)
- Anglican Diocese of Valparaíso
