= Horacio Valenzuela =

Chilean prelate of the Catholic Church (born 1954)

Horacio del Carmen Valenzuela Abarca (born 5 April 1954) is a Chilean prelate of the Catholic Church, who was Bishop of Talca from 1996 to 2018.

== Biography ==
Horacio Valenzuela was born in Santiago on 5 April 1954. He studied forestry at the Universidad de Concepción and the Universidad de Chile before entering the Major Seminary of Santiago. He was ordained a priest on 17 August 1985 by Cardinal Juan Francisco Fresno Larraín and filled a variety of pastoral assignments over the next decade.

On 11 March 1995, Pope John Paul II named him titular bishop of Gummi in Proconsulari and Auxiliary Bishop of Santiago de Chile. He received his episcopal consecration on 7 May from Cardinal Carlos Cardinal Oviedo Cavada. John Paul named him Bishop of Talca on 12 December 1996.

Before becoming a priest Valenzuela was part of a religious association formed by Fernando Karadima, and he remained part of his circle. Valenzuela defended Karadima when he faced charges of sexual abuse of minors, and was himself accused along with several other bishops of abetting Karadima.

Valenzuela said he never witnessed inappropriate kissing and that "Regarding the way in which he exercised spiritual direction, one must consider the strong character of Father Fernando which led him to correct it severely in order to educate: my experience is that this was not to exert undue pressure, control and manipulation. He corrected me many times and I appreciate it. We were all adults and if anyone felt uncomfortable he could get away".

On 18 May 2018, Valenzuela submitted his resignation to Pope Francis, as did all the Chilean bishops at the conclusion of a three-day meeting in Rome. Pope Francis accepted Valenzuela's resignation on 28 June 2018. In a farewell message to the people of his diocese, Valenzuela apologized in general terms "for what I did not do or did wrong", without mentioning the sexual abuse crisis or its victims. He declined to give interviews, even climbing out a window to avoid a reporter. In December 2018, the Vatican launched a formal investigation into allegations of clerical abuse of nuns in the Tacla Diocese while Valenzuela was bishop. Some victims alleged that Valenzuela was aware of the abuse.

Valenzuela had a private audience with Pope Francis on 15 April 2019.

== See also ==
- Catholic Church in Chile
- Catholic sexual abuse cases in Chile

== Sources ==
- Guzmán, Juan (2011). Los secretos del imperio de Karadima (in Spanish). Catalonia.
