= Rafael Edwards Salas =

Chilean academic and bishop of Roman Catholic Archdiocese of Santiago de Chile

- Titular Bishop of Dodona
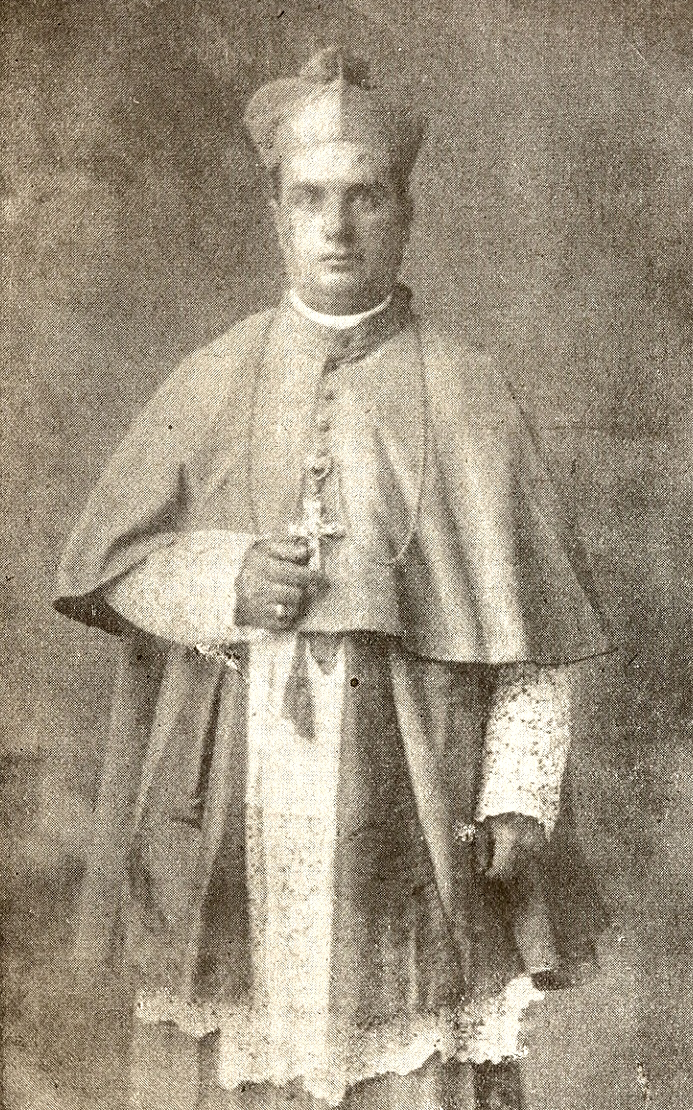

Orders
- Ordination: November 23, 1901 by Mariano Casanova y Casanova
- Consecration: October 31, 1915 by Pope Pius X

Personal details
- Born: January 6, 1878; Santiago, Chile
- Died: August 5, 1938
- Coat of arms

Monseñor Rafael Edwards Salas (born January 6, 1878 in Santiago, Chile - died August 5, 1938) was a Chilean priest, professor, and bishop who served as an auxiliary in the Archdiocese of Santiago de Chile and as the military vicar of Chile.

== Early life ==
He was the son of Eduardo Edwards Garriga and Javiera Salas Errázuriz and was baptized on the same day of his birth at Parroquia El Sagrario. He studied at Colegio San Ignacio, Seminario de Santiago, Pontificio Colegio Pio Latino Americano, Gregorian University of Rome, and Roman Academy of St. Thomas Aquinas. He earned a Doctorate in Philosophy.

== Priesthood ==
Upon returning to Chile, he received his priesthood ordination from the Archbishop of Santiago Mariano Casanova on November 23, 1901.

He served as a professor at the seminary, teaching philosophy and theology, and as a professor at the Institute of Humanities Luis Campino. He was the vice-director of the Society of Workers of Saint Joseph, Chaplain of Visitation in 1903, Director of the newspaper El País from 1901 to 1905, and served the La Estampa parish from 1905 to 1913.

== Bishop ==
On May 3, 1910, Pope Pius X established the General Military Vicariate and on May 27, 1910, he was appointed its first vicar; titular bishop of Dodona in 1910, and he received episcopal consecration on October 31, 1915.

He founded the Catholic Youth for Girls and the Eucharistic Crusade for Children. He served as the general advisor of the Catholic Action; Auxiliary Bishop of Santiago on June 22, 1921; President of the Eucharistic Congresses, and organized those held in Santiago, Concepción, and La Serena. He promoted the coronation of the Blessed Virgin of Carmen in 1926.

== Defense of Rapanui people's rights ==
Perhaps one of his most controversial and notable actions was his active defense of the violated rights of the Rapanui people. In his role as the military vicar, he responded to reports from naval officers about abuses and threats to national sovereignty. He intervened through strong press campaigns to restore the property of the Rapanui people, both their land and animals. In 1917, he "gave land" to "all Rapanui families," which has been interpreted as the official recognition of the territories that Rapanui families had occupied before the island became Chilean. Today, only the Rapanui people can be "landowners" on Easter Island.

In 2015, researchers from the University of Chile compiled and published his articles, reports, and interventions related to Easter Island and the Rapanui community in a single volume.

== Other activities and roles ==
He played a significant role during the Plebiscite of Tacna and Arica in 1925–1926. He was a member of the Royal Academy of Political and Social Sciences of Madrid, a Commander of the Order of the Crown of Italy, an Officer of the Legation of Honor, and Assistant to the Papal Throne on September 29, 1934.

He was the founder and honorary president of the Morning Star Sport Club, a sports institution that merged with the Club de Deportes Santiago in 1936 to create the Club de Deportes Santiago Morning.

== Death ==
He was returning from a trip to Europe aboard the ship Orbita when he died. His remains were interred in the Basilica of the Savior.
