= Ricardo Ezzati =

Archbishop and cardinal

His Eminence Ricardo Ezzati Andrello S.D.B.
- Cardinal, Archbishop Emeritus of Santiago de Chile
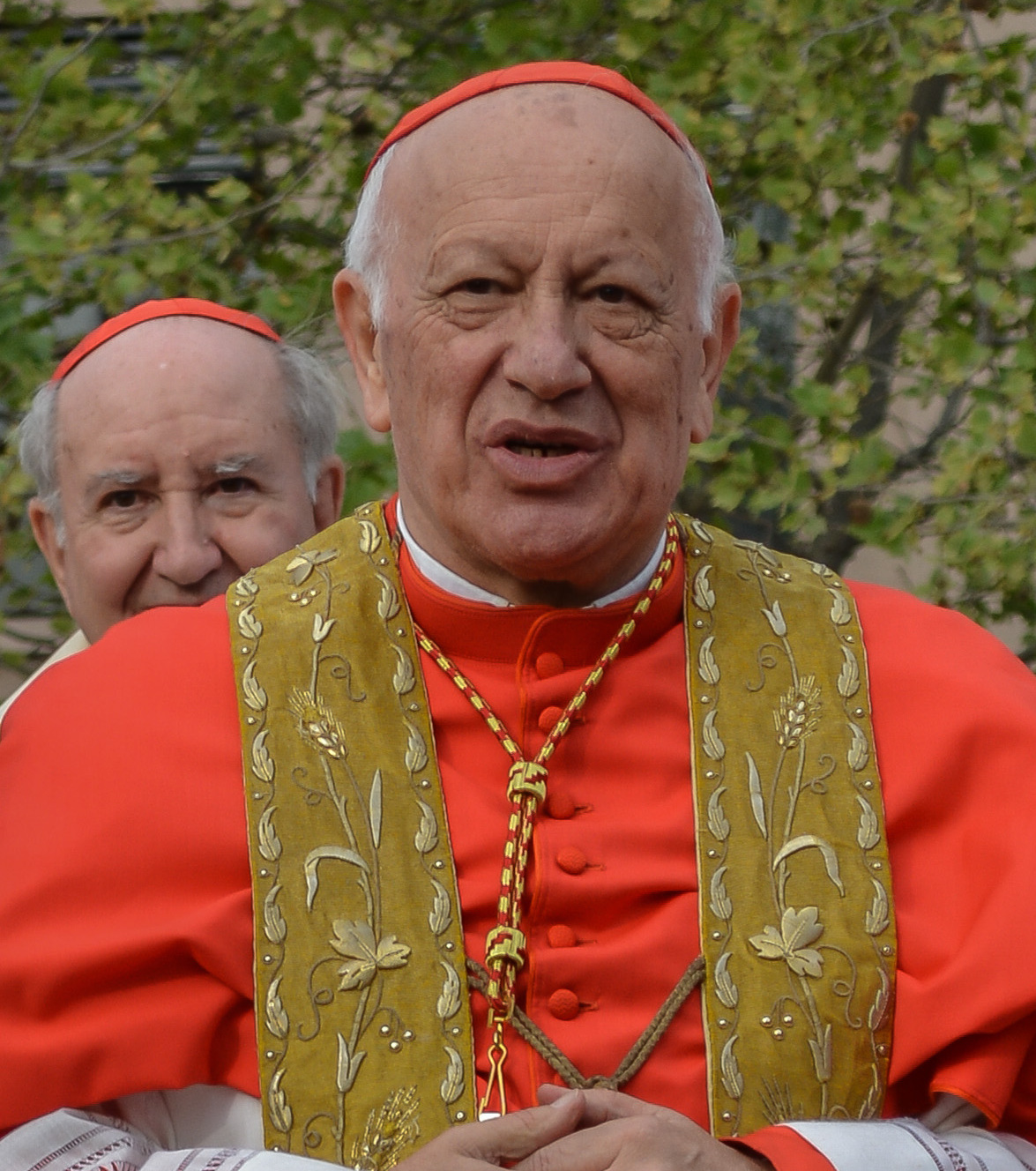
- Cardinal Ezzati in 2017
- Church: Roman Catholic Church
- Archdiocese: Santiago de Chile
- See: Santiago de Chile
- Appointed: 15 December 2010
- Installed: 14 January 2011
- Term ended: 23 March 2019
- Predecessor: Francisco Javier Errázuriz Ossa
- Successor: Celestino Aós Braco
- Other post: Cardinal-Priest of Santissimo Redentore a Valmelaina (2014–)
- Previous posts: Bishop of Valdivia (1996–2001); Auxiliary Bishop of Santiago de Chile (2001–06); Archbishop of Concepción (2006–10); President of the Chilean Episcopal Conference (2010–16)

Orders
- Ordination: 18 March 1970 by Emilio Tagle Covarrubias
- Consecration: 8 September 1996 by Carlos Oviedo Cavada
- Created cardinal: 22 February 2014 by Pope Francis
- Rank: Cardinal-Priest

Personal details
- Born: Ricardo Ezzati Andrello; 7 January 1942 (age 84) Campiglia dei Berici, Vicenza, Kingdom of Italy
- Education: Salesian Pontifical University; Pontifical Catholic University of Valparaíso
- Motto: Para Evangelizar (To Evangelize)
- Coat of arms: Ricardo Ezzati Andrello's coat of arms

Styles of Ricardo Ezzati Andrello
- Reference style: His Eminence
- Spoken style: Your Eminence
- Religious style: Cardinal
- Informal style: Cardinal

Ordination history of Ricardo Ezzati
History
Episcopal consecration
- Principal consecrator: Carlos Oviedo Cavada, O. de. M
- Co-consecrators: Sergio Otoniel Contreras Navia; Francisco Javier Errazuriz Ossa, P. schonstatt
Cardinalate
- Elevated by: Pope Francis
Episcopal succession
Bishops consecrated by Ricardo Ezzati as principal consecrator
- Pedro Mario Ossandón Buljevic: 12 December 2008
- Galo Fernández Villaseca: 10 May 2014
- Luis Fernando Ramos Pérez: 10 May 2014
- Moisés Carlos Atisha Contreras: 17 January 2015
- Jorge Enrique Concha Cayuqueo, OFM: 29 August 2015

Ricardo Ezzati Andrello SDB (Spanish pronunciation: [riˈkaɾðo eˈsatjanˈdɾelo], Italian: [etˈtsaːti anˈdrɛllo]; born 7 January 1942) is an Italian-born Chilean prelate of the Catholic Church who has lived and worked in Chile since the age of 17. He was Archbishop of Santiago from December 2010 to March 2019 and has been a cardinal since February 2014. He previously served as Archbishop of Concepción. He headed the Episcopal Conference of Chile from 2010 to 2016.

== Early life and education ==
Ricardo Ezzati was born in Campiglia dei Berici, Vicenza, Italy. He immigrated to Chile in 1959 to enter the novitiate of the Salesians in Quilpué, Valparaíso, and studied philosophy at the Catholic University of Valparaíso. He studied theology at the Pontifical Salesian University in Rome, where he obtained his licentiate.

He made his final vows as a Salesian on 30 December 1966 and was ordained as a priest of the Salesian order on 18 March 1970. After his ordination he received a Licentiate in Religious Studies at the Institut de Pastoral Catéchetique in Strasbourg. He then held the title of Professor of Religion and Philosophy at the Catholic University of Valparaíso.

== Priesthood ==
As a Salesian priest he held the following positions: Director for Youth Ministry in the Salesian School in Valdivia; Director of Community for the Salesians in Concepcion, Chile; Member of the Provincial Council of the Chilean Salesians; Director of the Salesian Seminary of Santiago de Chile; and Inspector Provincial of the Salesians in Chile.

He was a member of the Faculty of Theology at the Pontifical Catholic University of Chile and Vice President of the Conference of Religious of Chile, participating in the General Chapters of the Salesian Congregation in 1984 and 1990.

== Episcopate ==
In 1991, he was appointed to the Roman Curia as an official of the Congregation for Institutes of Consecrated Life and Societies of Apostolic Life.

On 28 June 1996, Pope John Paul II appointed him Bishop of Valdivia, Chile, and he was consecrated on 8 September.

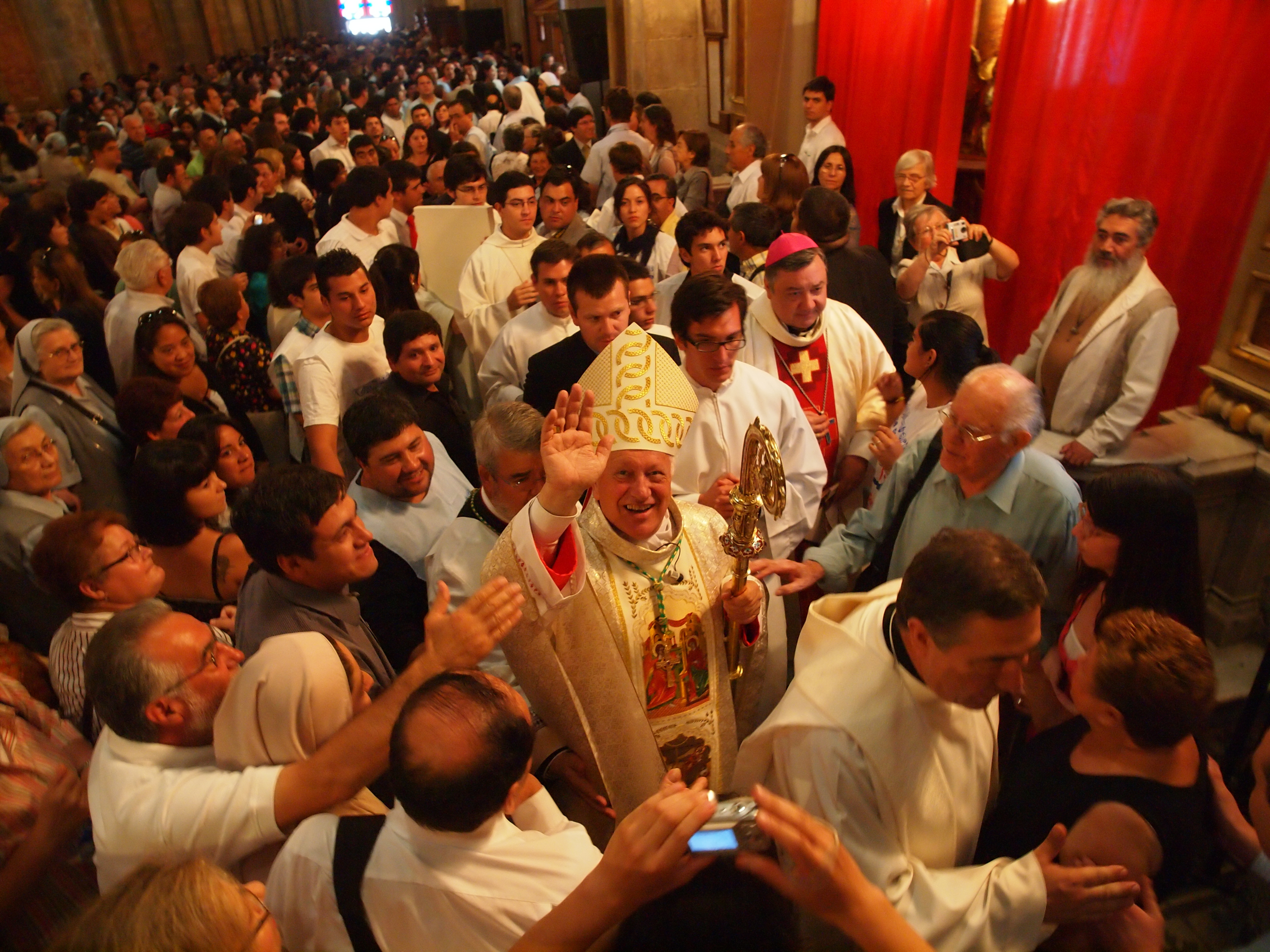
Ezzati leaving his installation mass, Santiago de Chile, 14 January 2011

On 10 July 2001, Pope John Paul II appointed him Auxiliary Bishop of the much larger Archdiocese of Santiago de Chile, assigning him the titular see of La Imperial. On 27 December 2006, he was named Archbishop of Concepción.

In June 2009, Pope Benedict XVI named him and four other prelates to serve as Apostolic Visitors to the Legionaries of Christ following the discovery that the order's founder, Marciel Maciel Degollado, an associate of Pope John Paul II, had engaged in sexual abuse of minors and young men. Ezzati was given responsibility for investigating the order in South America: Chile, Argentina, Colombia, Brazil and Venezuela, where the Legion had 20 houses, 122 priests and 122 religious seminarians.

While archbishop of Concepción, Ezzati mediated a dispute between the government and a group of 34 Mapuche prisoners who had been on a hunger strike for 82 days.

On 15 December 2010, Pope Benedict appointed Ezzati as Archbishop of Santiago de Chile to replace Cardinal Francisco Errázuriz, who had submitted his resignation as required upon reaching the age of 75. Ezzati was installed in Santiago de Chile on 14 January 2011.

Pope Francis named Ezzati a member of the Congregation for Catholic Education in November 2013.

He was elevated to the rank of cardinal at a consistory on 22 February 2014. In May 2014, Pope Francis named him a member of the Pontifical Commission for Latin America.

In October 2014, Ezzati denied press reports that he had denounced the Jesuit priest Felipe Berríos to the Vatican and said he had only replied to inquiries about the priest's controversial statements from the papal nuncio. Press reports later demonstrated that Ezzati had initiated the accusation process to prevent Berríos from becoming chaplain at the presidential palace.

He participated in the Synod of Bishops on the Family in October 2014 and October 2015. He was one of the four prelates who presented the 2014 synod's summary document (the relatio). He served as president of the Episcopal Conference of Chile from 2010 to 2016.

In December 2016, Ezzati submitted his resignation as required upon reaching the age of 75. Pope Francis did not accept it. In May 2018, Ezzati submitted it again.

On 22 March 2019, the Supreme Court of Chile rejected Ezzati's petition to stop the preliminary proceedings against him and not to bring in an accusation against him. One day later, Pope Francis accepted the submitted resignation.

=== Karadima case scandal ===
In February 2011, he announced that the Congregation for the Doctrine of the Faith, based on an investigation conducted under his predecessor, had found Fernando Karadima, a prominent priest in the archdiocese, guilty of sexually abusing minors. In 2013 and 2014, he teamed with his predecessor, Cardinal Errazuriz, on a secret campaign to prevent Juan Carlos Cruz, one of Karadima's victims and accusers, from being appointed to the Pontifical Commission for the Protection of Minors. The revelation of their email correspondence in September 2015 prompted advocates for victims of abuse to call for Ezzati's resignation.

In January 2015, Pope Francis named Bishop Juan Barros Madrid to head a diocese. Barros was closely associated with Karadima and continued to defend him. Ezzati's advice that the appointment be withdrawn was not accepted.

==== Ongoing lawsuit ====
On October 21, 2018, reports surfaced that Chile's Court of Appeal ordered Ezzati's office to pay 450 million Chilean pesos ($650,000) to three men who claimed that Karadima had sexually abused them for decades. However, Dobra Lusic, a spokesperson for the Court of Appeal, stated that the lawsuit was still ongoing and that no verdict had been reached.

== Resignation amid new lawsuit ==
A man filed a $500,000 lawsuit against Ezzati and the Archdiocese of Santiago claiming that in 2015 he had been raped in a bedroom attached to the cathedral and that Ezzati had bribed him to keep silent. On 23 March 2019, Pope Francis accepted Ezzati's resignation, presented when he turned 75.

== See also ==
- Sexual abuse scandal in the Legion of Christ
- Controversies surrounding the Legion of Christ
- Roman Catholicism in Chile
- Cardinals created by Francis

Catholic Church titles
Preceded by Alejandro Jiménez Lafeble	Bishop of Valdivia; 28 June 1996 – 10 July 2001	Succeeded by Ignacio Francisco Ducasse Medina
Titular see established	— TITULAR — Titular Bishop of La Imperial; 10 July 2001 – 27 December 2006	Succeeded by Pedro Mario Ossandón Buljevic
Preceded by Antonio Moreno Casamitjana	Archbishop of Concepción; 27 December 2006 – 15 December 2010	Succeeded by Fernando Natalio Chomali Garib
Preceded by Francisco Javier Errázuriz Ossa	Archbishop of Santiago; 15 December 2010 – 23 March 2019	Succeeded by Celestino Aós Braco
Preceded by Ersilio Tonini	Cardinal-Priest of Santissimo Redentore a Valmelaina; 22 February 2014 –	Incumbent
