= Unciti =

Municipality of Spain

Coordinates: 42°45′N 1°30′W

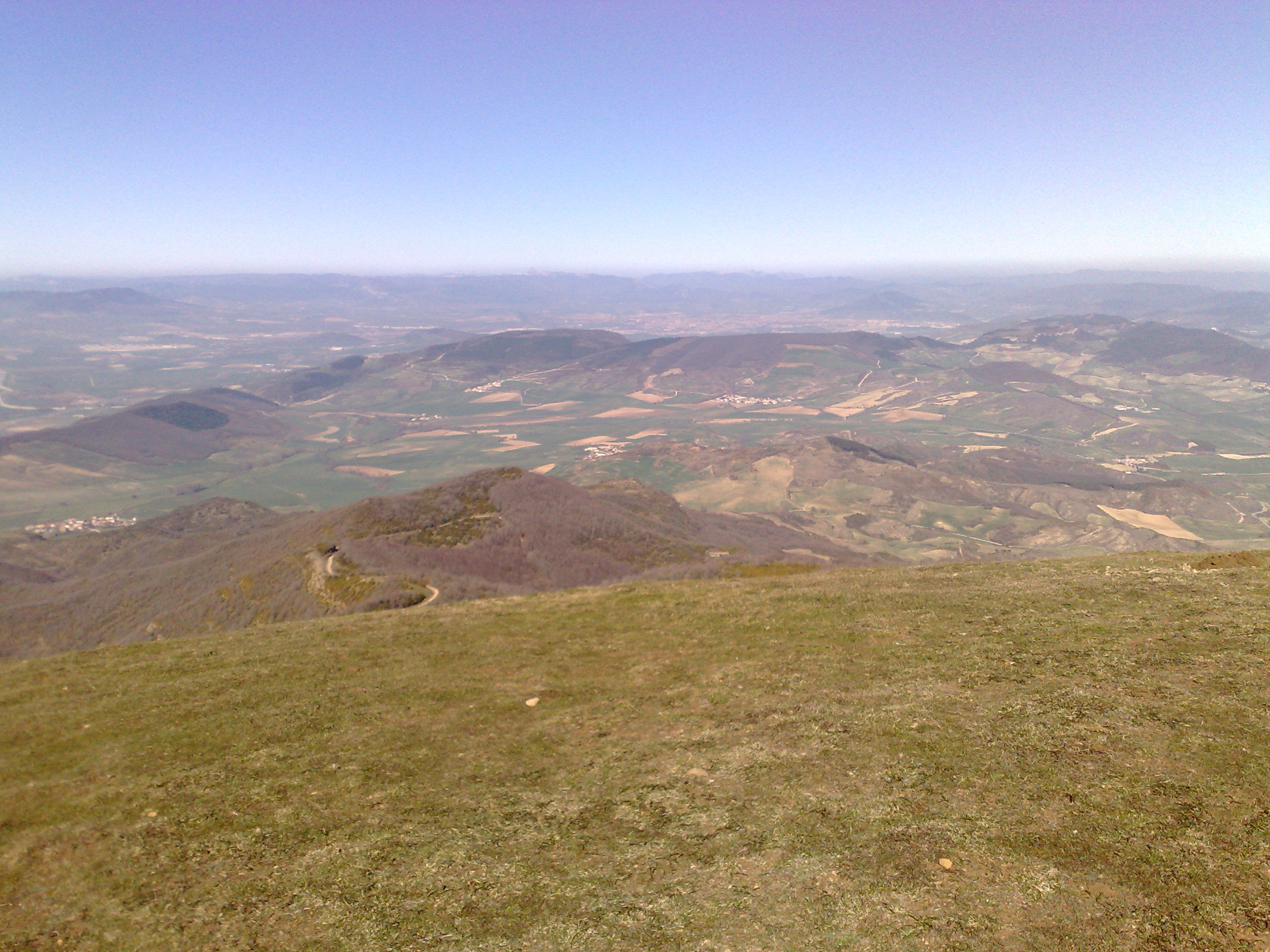
Valleys of the region of Unciti, view from mount Itzaga

Unciti is a town and municipality located in the province and autonomous community of Navarre, northern Spain.
