= Roman Catholic Diocese of Valparaíso =

Diocese of the Catholic Church in Chile

Diocese of Valparaíso Dioecesis Vallis Paradisi Diócesis de Valparaíso

Catholic
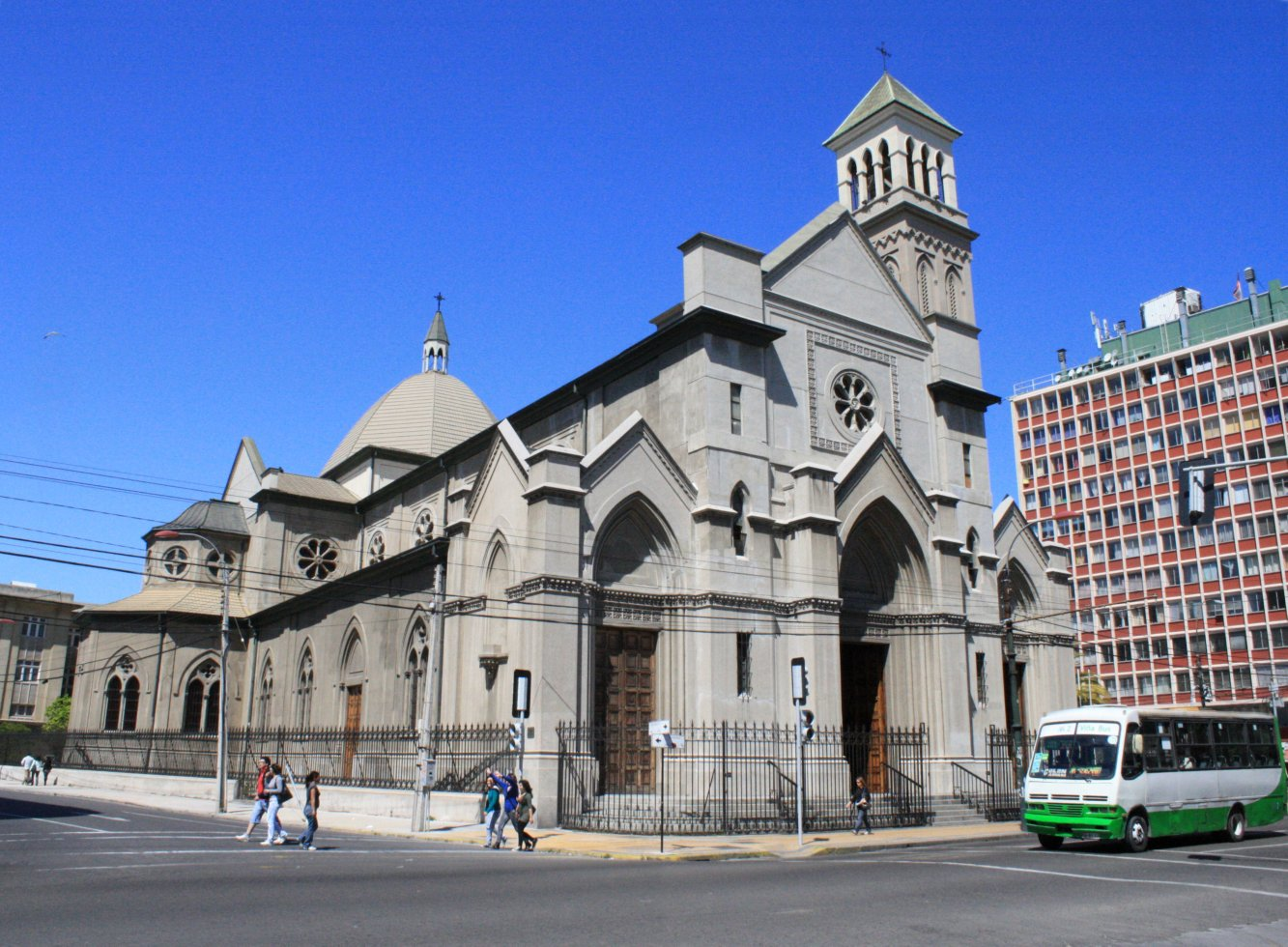
- Cathedral of St. James

- Coat of arms

Location
- Country: Chile
- Ecclesiastical province: Santiago de Chile
- Metropolitan: Santiago de Chile

Statistics
- Area: 4,600 km^{2} (1,800 sq mi)
- Population: Total; Catholics: (as of 2010); 1,259,000; 932,000 (74%)

Information
- Rite: Latin Rite
- Established: 2 November 1872 (153 years ago)
- Cathedral: Cathedral of St James in Valparaíso
- Patron saint: Our Lady of Mount Carmel

Current leadership
- Pope: Leo XIV
- Bishop: Jorge Patricio Vega Velasco, S.V.D.
- Metropolitan Archbishop: Celestino Aós Braco, OFM Cap
- Bishops emeritus: Gonzalo Duarte García de Cortázar

Website
- www.obispadodevalparaiso.cl

The Diocese of Valparaíso (Latin: Vallis Paradisi) is a suffragan Latin diocese in the ecclesiastical province of Santiago de Chile in central Chile.

Its cathedral episcopal see, the Catedral de Santiago, dedicated to the Apostle St. James the Elder (Spanish: Santiago) in the city of Valparaíso, Valparaíso Province, is a Minor World Heritage Site.

== Statistics ==
As per 2014, it pastorally served 966,000 Catholics (74.1% of 1,304,000 total) on 4,763 km² in 69 parishes and 260 missions with 171 priests (86 diocesan, 85 religious), 71 deacons, 406 lay religious (133 brothers, 273 sisters) and 16 seminarians.

== History ==
- Established on November 2, 1872 as Mission “sui iuris” of Valparaíso on territory split off from the Archdiocese of Santiago de Chile
- Promoted on October 18, 1925 to Diocese of Valparaíso
- Lost territory in 1981 to the Diocese of San Felipe
- Gained territory in 2001 from the then Apostolic Vicariate of Araucanía (now Diocese of Villarrica).

== Bishops ==
=== Bishops of Valparaíso ===
- Eduardo Gimpert Paut (1925–1937)
- Rafael Lira Infante, (1938–1958)
- Raúl Silva Henríquez, O.S.B. (1959–1961), appointed Archbishop of Santiago de Chile (Cardinal in 1962)
- Emilio Tagle Covarrubias (1961–1983), Archbishop (personal title)
- Francisco de Borja Valenzuela Ríos (1983–1993), Archbishop (personal title)
- Jorge Arturo Medina Estévez (1993–1996), appointed Pro-Prefect, and later Prefect, of the Congregation for Divine Worship and the Discipline of the Sacraments (elevated to Cardinal in 1998)
- Francisco Javier Errázuriz Ossa, I.Sch. (1996–1998), Archbishop (personal title); appointed Archbishop of Santiago de Chile (Cardinal in 2001)
- Gonzalo Duarte García de Cortázar, SS.CC. (1998–2018)
- Jorge Patricio Vega Velasco, S.V.D. (2021–present)

=== Auxiliary bishops ===
- Francisco Javier Prado Aránguiz, SS.CC. (1988–1993), appointed Bishop of Rancagua
- Juan de la Cruz Barros Madrid (1995–2000), appointed Bishop of Iquique
- Santiago Jaime Silva Retamales (2002–2015), appointed Bishop of Chile, Militar

=== Other priests of this diocese who became bishops ===
- Mariano Jaime Casanova Casanova (Vicar General here, 1872–1885), appointed Archbishop of Santiago de Chile in 1886
- Salvador Donos Rodríguez (Vicar General here, 1885–1892), never consecrated bishop
- Manuel Tomás Mesa (Vicar General here, 1892, did not take effect?)
- Ramón Ángel Jara Ruz (Vicar General here, 1894–1898), appointed Bishop of San Carlos de Ancud
- José Manuel Santos Ascarza, appointed Bishop of Valdivia in 1955
- Francisco Javier Gillmore Stock, appointed Vicar Apostolic of Chile, Military in 1959; consecrated bishop in 1962
- Sergio Otoniel Contreras Navia, appointed Bishop of San Carlos de Ancud in 1966
- Carlos Marcio Camus Larenas, appointed Bishop of Copiapó in 1968
- Gonzalo Arturo Bravo Álvarez, appointed Bishop of San Felipe in 2020

== See also ==
- List of Catholic dioceses in Chile

== Sources and external links ==
- GCatholic.org, with Google map and satellite photo - data for all sections
- Catholic Hierarchy
- Diocese website
