= Military Ordinariate of Chile =

Catholic ecclesiastical jurisdiction in Chile

Military Bishopric of Chile Obispado Castrense de Chile
- The Coat of Arms of the Military Bishopric of Chile

Location
- Country: Chile
- Metropolitan: Immediately exempt to the Holy See

Information
- Denomination: Catholic Church
- Sui iuris church: Latin Church
- Rite: Roman Rite
- Established: 3 May 1910 (116 years ago)
- Cathedral: Military Cathedral of Our Lady of Mount Carmel, Santiago
- Patron saint: Our Lady of Mount Carmel

Current leadership
- Pope: Leo XIV
- Bishop: Pedro Mario Ossandón Buljevic

The Military Bishopric of Chile (Spanish: Obispado Castrense de Chile) is a Latin Church military ordinariate of the Catholic Church. Immediately exempt to the Holy See, it provides pastoral care to Roman Catholics serving in the Chilean Armed Forces and their families.

== History ==
It was first established as a military vicariate on 3 May 1910 with the first military vicar appointment on 27 May 1910. It was elevated to a military ordinariate 21 July 1986. The military ordinary's seat is located at the Military Cathedral of Our Lady of Mount Carmel (Catedral Castrense de Nuestra Señora del Carmen) in the city of Santiago, Chile.

== Bishops ==
=== Office holders ===
Military vicars

- Rafael Edwards Salas (appointed 27 May 1910 – died 5 August 1938)
- José Luis Fermandois Cabrera (appointed 8 August 1938 – died 18 August 1941)
- Carlos Labbé Márquez (appointed 18 August 1941 – died 17 October 1941)
- Julio Tadeo Ramírez Ortiz (appointed 17 October 1941 – died 10 June 1942)
- Teodoro Eugenín Barrientos, SS.CC. (appointed 20 June 1942 – retired 21 December 1959)
- Francisco Xavier Gillmore Stock (appointed 16 October 1959 – retired 26 November 1983)
- José Joaquín Matte Varas (appointed 26 November 1983 – became military ordinary 21 July 1986)

Military ordinaries

- José Joaquín Matte Varas (appointed 21 July 1986 – resigned 31 January 1995)
- Gonzalo Duarte García de Cortázar, SS.CC. (appointed 31 January 1995 – resigned 4 November 1999)
- Pablo Lizama Riquelme (appointed 4 January 1999 – Appointed, Coadjutor Archbishop of Antofagasta 27 February 2004)
- Juan Barros Madrid (appointed 9 October 2004 – appointed Bishop of Osorno, installed March 2015)
- Santiago Silva Retamales (appointed 7 July 2015 – appointed Bishop of Valdivia 23 December 2020)
- Pedro Mario Ossandón Buljevic (appointed 28 October 2021 – present)

=== Auxiliary bishop ===
- Hernán Frías Hurtado (1957), did not take effect
