= Francisco Javier Errázuriz Ossa =

Catholic cardinal

His Eminence Francisco Javier Errázuriz Ossa
- Cardinal, Archbishop Emeritus of Santiago de Chile
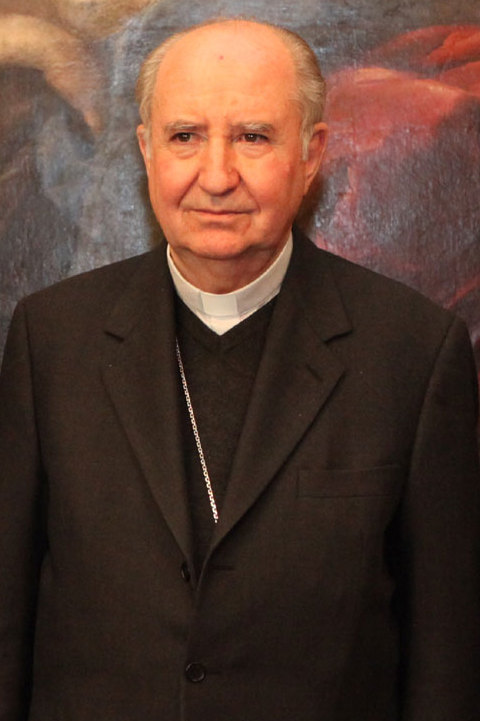
- Errázuriz in 2010
- Church: Latin Church
- Archdiocese: Santiago
- See: Santiago
- Appointed: 24 April 1998
- Installed: 17 May 1998
- Term ended: 15 December 2010
- Predecessor: Carlos Oviedo Cavada
- Successor: Ricardo Ezzati Andrello
- Other post: Cardinal-Priest of S. Maria della Pace (2001-)
- Previous posts: Secretary of the Congregation for Institutes of Consecrated Life and Societies of Apostolic Life (1990–96); Titular Archbishop of Hólar (1990–96); Archbishop (personal title) of Valparaíso (1996–98); Member of the Council of Cardinals (2013-18)

Orders
- Ordination: 16 July 1961 by Manuel Larraín Errazuriz
- Consecration: 6 January 1991 by Pope John Paul II
- Created cardinal: 21 February 2001 by Pope John Paul II
- Rank: Cardinal Priest

Personal details
- Born: Francisco Javier Errázuriz Ossa; 5 September 1933 (age 93) Santiago, Chile
- Denomination: Roman Catholic
- Education: Pontifical Catholic University of Chile; University of Fribourg
- Coat of arms

Francisco Javier Errázuriz Ossa (Spanish pronunciation: [fɾanˈsisko xaˈβjeɾ eˈrasuɾis ˈosa]; born 5 September 1933) is a Chilean prelate of the Catholic Church who served as Archbishop of Santiago from 1998 to 2010. He has been a cardinal since 2001 and was a member of Pope Francis' Council of Cardinal Advisers from its creation in 2013 until his departure in 2018.

Styles of Francisco Errázuriz Ossa
- Reference style: His Eminence
- Spoken style: Your Eminence
- Informal style: Cardinal
- See: Santiago de Chile (emeritus)

== Early life ==
Born in Santiago, second of the six children of Pedro Errázuriz Larraín and Marta Ossa Ruíz. He studied at the Liceo Alemán de los padres del Verbo Divino and later at the Faculty of Engineering of the Pontifical Catholic University of Chile, where he graduated with a bachelor's degree in mathematics in 1953.

For eight years, he was a member of the Student Center and of Federation of Students and joined different university groups of the nascent Schönstatt Movement. Errázuriz befriended the Servant of God Mario Hiriart Pulido and with him and other students originated this Marian apostolic movement in Chile.

Errázuriz attended the State University of Fribourg, Switzerland, where he obtained a licentiate in philosophy and doctorate in theology. Besides his native Spanish, he speaks Italian, German and French.

== Priest ==
He was ordained as a priest for the Schönstatt Fathers on 16 July 1961, in Fribourg, by Manuel Larraín Errázuriz, bishop of Talca. In October 1962, he met the Rev. Josef Kentenich, founder of the secular Institute of Fathers of Schönstatt, whose spiritual paternity he considers a special gift from God. From 1963 to 1965, Errázuriz was consultor of youth communities and university students in several cities in Chile.

He served from 1965 to 1971 as regional superior in Chile of the Fathers of Schönstatt. From Chile he directed the community of the institute in the Iberian peninsula and in Ecuador. As regional superior, he participated in the conference of clergy in Chile and was elected its vice-president. During those years he worked with Cardinal Raúl Silva Henríquez, who had welcomed the institute, then in its organizational phase, in his archdiocese. In 1971, he was called to serve his community's general council in Germany.

He became a member of the general council of the institute from 1971 to 1974. In 1974, he was elected superior general of the Schönstatt Fathers, and president of the International Council of the Work of Schöntatt, and re-elected in 1980 and 1986. Because of his post, he conducted multiple pastoral visits to Europe, America, Africa and Australia. and then became a chaplain in the Schönstatt Movement.

== Bishop ==
On 22 December 1990, Errázuriz was appointed titular Archbishop of Hólar and secretary of the Congregation for Institutes of Consecrated Life and Societies of Apostolic Life. He was consecrated on 6 January 1991 in the Lateran Basilica by Pope John Paul II. The principal co-consecrators were Giovanni Battista Re, then the Substitute for General Affairs of the Secretariat of State, and Justin Francis Rigali, secretary of the Congregation for Bishops. Errázuriz adopted the motto: Ut vitam habeant. He attended the IX Ordinary Assembly of the World Synod of Bishops, in the Vatican City, 2–29 October 1994, as an appointee of Pope John Paul.

Errázuriz was named bishop of Valparaíso, Chile, on 24 September 1996. He attended the Special Assembly for America of the World Synod of Bishops, Vatican City, 16 November – 12 December 1997. He was transferred to the metropolitan see of Archdiocese of Santiago, on 24 April 1998. He became the Grand chancellor of the Pontifical Catholic University of Chile the same year. He was elected president of the Chilean Episcopal Conference for three years, on 20 November 1998; and reelected, on 16 November 2001. He was elected first vice-president of the Latin American Episcopal Council (CELAM), on 13 May 1999.

== Cardinal ==
He was created cardinal in the consistory of 21 February 2001 by Pope John Paul II and was assigned as Cardinal-Priest to the titular church of S. Maria della Pace. In May of the same year he was named a member of the Congregation for Institutes of Consecrated Life and Societies of Apostolic Life and of the Pontifical Council for the Family.

He attended the Tenth Ordinary Assembly of the World Synod of Bishops, Vatican City, 30 September – 27 October 2001. He was inducted as a member of the Academy of Social, Political and Moral Sciences of the Institute of Chile, Santiago, on 19 December 2002. He was elected president of the Episcopal Conference of Latin America (CELAM) on 16 May 2003 to serve from 2003 to 2007.

In 2003, he made public remarks calling for investigation into a pedophile ring in Chile.

He was one of the cardinal electors who participated in the 2005 papal conclave that elected Pope Benedict XVI. He attended the XI General Ordinary Assembly of the World Synod of Bishops, Vatican City, 2–23 October 2005 as a papal appointee.

He was President of the Fifth General Conference of the Latin American and Caribbean Bishops, which met in Aparecida, Brazil, from 13 to 31 May 2007.

Pope Benedict XVI accepted Errázuriz's resignation as Archbishop of Santiago on 15 December 2010. His successor is Ricardo Ezzati Andrello. He was one of the cardinal electors who participated in the 2013 papal conclave that elected Pope Francis.

On 13 April 2013 Pope Francis appointed him to the Council of Cardinal Advisers to advise him and to study a plan for revising the Apostolic Constitution on the Roman Curia, Pastor Bonus.

=== Sexual abuse cases ===
During his time as cardinal, Errázuriz refused to meet with those who claimed to have been abused by clergymen. He refused public calls for an investigation of Father Fernando Karadima and the issue of clergy sexual abuse more generally. In 2010, Father Fernando was found by Chilean court and church investigations to have been an abuser and was forced into retirement. In court testimony, Errázuriz asserted that he did not act on allegations he received because he believed them to be untrue.

In 2015 documents published in Chile showed that Errázuriz and Cardinal Ricardo Ezzati Andrello tried to prevent Juan Carlos Cruz, one of Chile's best known survivors of clerical abuse, from being nominated to the Vatican's newly established Pontifical Commission for the Protection of Minors. In May 2018, Errázuriz declined an invitation to travel to the Vatican to attend a sex abuse conference with the Chilean Bishops, citing "personal reasons."

==== Evidence of sex abuse coverup ====
In 2018, a 2009 email which Cardinal Errázuriz wrote to Archbishop Giuseppe Pinto, the then Apostolic Nuncio to Chile, and which was made public during a lawsuit which Cruz and two others filed against the Archdiocese of Santiago, revealed Errázuriz's role in covering up growing allegations of sexual abuse against notorious priest Fernando Karadima “The presentation of the allegations to the promotor of justice normally calms the aggression of the accusers,” Errázuriz wrote. “With respect to F. Karadima I didn't ask the promotor to interrogate him; I only asked Monsignor Andrés Arteaga for his opinion. He considered everything absolutely implausible. Since this was about facts that had prescribed [past the statute of limitations], I closed the investigation. That's how I chose to protect them, conscious that the way I acted, if the accusers at some point brought the case to the media, it would turn against me.” A complaint which was filed by three victims of Karadima on October 25, 2018, named Errázuriz as the leader of the coverup and Ezzati, Pinto, Artega (who now serves as Auxiliary Bishop of Santiago), and Chile's Minister of the Court of Appeals Juan Manuel Muñoz as witnesses to it as well.

In 2020, an email surfaced revealing that Errázuriz had delivered settlement money to Diego Ossa, an accused "predator priest" who was also charged two counts of sex abuse and covering up sex abuse incidents which occurred in 2005, so Ossa could pay one of his complainants Óscar Osbén. Ossa, who was removed from public ministry in August 2018 and was undergoing a Vatican criminal trial involving three sexual and power abuse charges, died in April 2020 of pancreatic cancer.

== Departure from the Council of Cardinal Advisors ==
It was reported in July 2018 that Cardinal Errázuriz was living in a nursing home in Chile. On 16 August 2018, Spanish media reported that Errazuriz had been removed from the Council of Cardinal Advisers due to the ongoing allegations. Though he had not yet been officially removed from the council, Errazuriz was also absent from a September 2018 Council of Cardinals meeting due to sex abuse investigations.

Victims of Karadima filed a complaint against Errazuriz on 25 October, accusing him of perjury in the civil suit for compensation for damages filed against the Archdiocese of Santiago. On 15 November 2018, Errazuriz announced that he was no longer a member of the Council of Cardinal Advisers, saying his five-year term had expired, though all other members of the Council remained in place. At the same time, a Chilean prosecutor announced that he had summoned Errázuriz to testify about covering up sexual abuse.

== Investigation ==
On March 27, 2019, the Chile Court of Appeals ruled against the Archdiocese of Santiago and ordered the Archdiocese to pay compensation to three victims of Karadima. The ruling also paved the way for more lawsuits as well. On March 28, 2019, it was announced that Errázuriz was named as a defendant in an ongoing investigation and had testified before prosecutors. On April 20, 2019, he was once again testified. During this testimony, Errázuriz spent 12 hours answering questions from lead sex abuse prosecutor Jorge Escobar, but remained silent at times and often replied "I don't remember." He also alleged that child molestation starts as "progress," followed by "psychological deformation" and then eventually a crime.

== See also ==
- Karadima case
- Catholic Church in Chile

== Sources ==
Catholic Church titles
Preceded by Bodo-Maria Erhard	Superior General of the Schönstatt Fathers; 1974 – 22 December 1990	Succeeded by Michael Johannes Marmann
Preceded by Lawrence Joyce Kenney	— TITULAR — Titular Archbishop of Holár; 22 December 1990 – 24 April 1998	Succeeded by Mathew Moolakkattu
Preceded by Vincenzo Fagiolo	Secretary of Congregation for Institutes of Consecrated Life and for Societies of Apostolic Life; 22 December 1990 – 24 September 1996	Succeeded by Piergiorgio Silvano Nesti
Preceded by Jorge Medina	Bishop of Valparaíso; 24 September 1996 – 24 April 1998	Succeeded by Gonzalo Duarte García de Cortázar
Preceded by Carlos Oviedo Cavada	President of the Chilean Episcopal Conference; 1998 – 2004	Succeeded by Alejandro Goić Karmelić
Preceded by Carlos Oviedo Cavada	Archbishop of Santiago; 24 April 1998 – 15 December 2010	Succeeded by Ricardo Ezzati Andrello
Preceded by Luciano Pedro Mendes de Almeida	First Vice-President of the Latin American Episcopal Council; 1999 – 2003	Succeeded by Carlos Aguiar Retes
Preceded by Joseph Asajirō Satowaki	Cardinal Priest of Santa Maria della Pace; 21 February 2001 –	Incumbent
Preceded by Jorge Enrique Jiménez Carvajal	President of the Latin American Episcopal Council; 2003 – 12 July 2007	Succeeded by Raymundo Damasceno Assis
