= Jorge Medina (cardinal) =

Chilean prelate of the Catholic Church (1926–2021)

His Eminence Jorge Medina
- Prefect of the Congregation for Divine Worship and the Discipline of the Sacraments
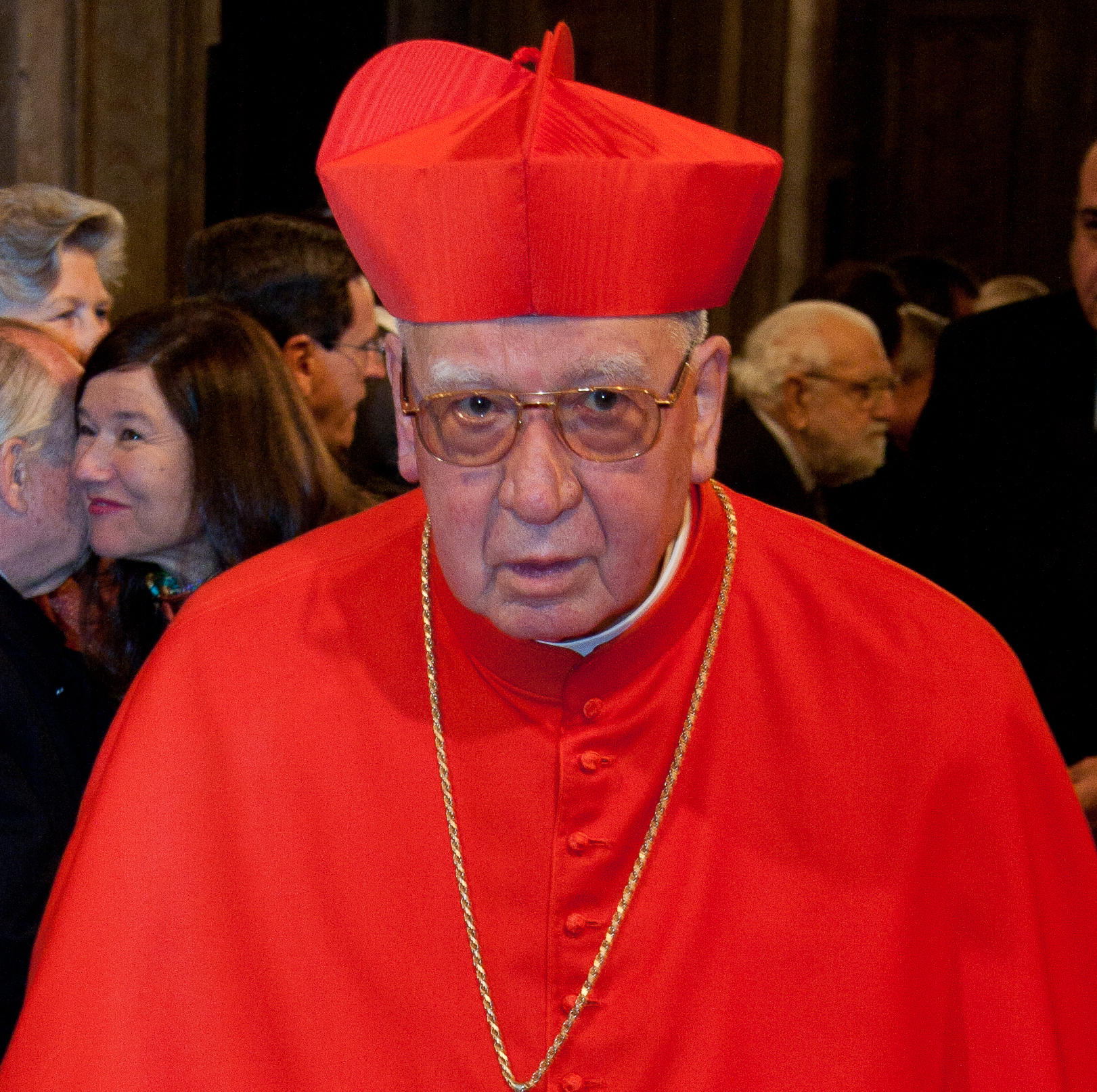
- Jorge Medina in 2011
- Church: Catholic Church
- Appointed: 21 June 1996
- Term ended: 1 October 2002
- Predecessor: Antonio María Javierre Ortas S.D.B.
- Successor: Francis Arinze
- Other post: Cardinal-Priest "pro hac vice" of Santa Saba (2008–21)
- Previous posts: Titular Bishop of Thibilis (1984–87); Auxiliary Bishop of Rancagua (1984–87); Bishop of Rancagua (1987–93); Bishop of Valparaíso (1993–96); Cardinal-Deacon of San Saba (1998–2008); Cardinal Protodeacon (2005–07)

Orders
- Ordination: 12 June 1954 by Pio Alberto Fariña Fariña
- Consecration: 6 January 1985 by Pope John Paul II
- Created cardinal: 21 February 1998 by Pope John Paul II
- Rank: Cardinal-Deacon (1998–2008); Cardinal-Priest (2008–21)

Personal details
- Born: Jorge Arturo Agustín Medina Estévez; 23 December 1926 Santiago, Chile
- Died: 3 October 2021 (aged 94) Santiago, Chile
- Education: Pontifical Catholic University of Chile
- Motto: Oportet illum crescere (He must increase)
- Coat of arms

Jorge Arturo Agustín Medina Estévez (Spanish: [ˈxoɾxe meˈðina]; 23 December 1926 – 3 October 2021) was a Chilean prelate of the Catholic Church who held senior positions both in his native country and in the Roman Curia. He was prefect of the Congregation for Divine Worship and the Discipline of the Sacraments from 1996 to 2002 and was made a cardinal in 1998. Beginning in 1985, he served as auxiliary bishop and then from 1987 bishop of Rancagua and then bishop of Valparaíso from 1993 to 1996.

As Cardinal Protodeacon, the longest-serving cardinal of the order of cardinal deacons, he announced the election of Pope Benedict XVI to the world on 19 April 2005.

== Early life and ordination ==
Medina was born in Santiago in 1926, and studied at the Pontifical Catholic University of Chile, where he received a bachelor's degree in the arts and biology, and the Major Seminary of Santiago. He was ordained a priest on 12 June 1954 by Bishop Pio Fariña Fariña, the vicar general and an auxiliary bishop of Santiago.

== Church scholar ==
Earning a doctorate in theology in 1955, Medina taught philosophy and theology at the Major Seminary of Santiago and of the Pontifical Catholic University, respectively, until 1965. He also served as a dean of the university, and as a peritus at the Second Vatican Council; for the latter, he later received an honoris causa doctorate from the University of Notre Dame in 1996.

== Bishop ==
Pro-Grand Chancellor of the Catholic University from 1974 to 1985, he was named titular bishop of Thibilis and auxiliary bishop of Rancagua on 18 December 1984. Medina was consecrated to the episcopate on 6 January 1985, by Pope John Paul II, with Cardinals Eduardo Martínez Somalo and Duraisamy Simon Lourdusamy acting as co-consecrators. He was made Bishop of Rancagua on 25 November 1987, and then Bishop of Valparaíso on 16 April 1993.

== Pro-Prefect and Prefect ==
On 21 June 1996, Medina was appointed Pro-Prefect of the Congregation for Divine Worship and the Discipline of the Sacraments in Rome, being given the title of Prefect of the Congregation from 23 February 1998 until his retirement on 1 October 2002.

== Cardinal ==
Medina was created a Cardinal-Deacon in the consistory of 21 February 1998, with the title of San Saba.

Styles of Jorge Medina
- Reference style: His Eminence
- Spoken style: Your Eminence
- Informal style: Cardinal
- See: Valparaíso (emeritus)

Medina was one of the cardinal electors who participated in the 2005 papal conclave. Following the conclusion of the conclave, as Cardinal Protodeacon, the senior cardinal deacon, he announced to the world the election of Pope Benedict XVI. He was the first non-Italian to do so in centuries and the first Latin American. As protodeacon, Medina imposed the pallium on Pope Benedict XVI and was one of the three cardinals who made the public act of obedience to him at the papal inauguration.

In retirement he returned to Chile in order to work as a priest in a parish in Las Condes. In the same period he published many short works of a pastoral nature.

== Death and legacy ==
He died in Santiago on 3 October 2021. Months after his death, a small park in his hometown was named after him by the local Council.

== Views ==
Medina was a man of controversial views. He was a supporter of the Chilean coup d'etat by General Augusto Pinochet and the regime it established. He was accused of having, in his capacity as dean of the Pontifical Catholic University of Chile, been one of the main denouncers of students and teachers suspected of having communist or socialist affiliations, many of whom became disappeared detainees. He never acknowledged the human rights violations of Pinochet's regime, including those featured in the Rettig Report or the Valech Report.

In December 2008, at a Mass marking the second anniversary of the death of Pinochet, Medina condemned pop musician Madonna, who was appearing in Santiago. He said "The atmosphere in our city is pretty agitated because this woman is visiting and, with incredibly shameful behaviour, provokes a wild and lustful enthusiasm."

=== Sexual abuse of minors by priests ===
The prominent 80-year-old priest Fernando Karadima was found guilty in January 2011 by the Congregation for the Doctrine of the Faith of having sexually abused minors and ordered to retire to a life of prayer and penitence and never to exercise the priesthood in public again, Karadima was then accused under Chilean civil law of sexual abuse of minors, Medina is reported to have said that he doubted that the cleric would be sent to prison, since homosexual activity was not a crime in Chilean civil law and use of the term "sexual abuse" could be questioned: "With all due respect to the laws of my country, a child of 8 or 9 is very different from a 17-year-old ... A 17-year-old youngster knows what he is doing." He also remarked that priests are not immune to the devil's works: "Any informed Christian knows we are prone to weakness because of our human fragility. The devil gets in where he can. Priests are not immune from his snares." He defended the canonical sanctions imposed on Karadima as being the heaviest that could be imposed short of laicization, and as having taken into account Karadima's age and merits.

One of Karadima's accusers called the cardinal's remark about 17-year-olds "an unwarranted attack". Another added that it was an attack not only on those who had denounced Karadima, but on all who were honestly looking for truth and justice for their lives. He regarded Medina's statements as "extremely suspicious, as if he wanted to diminish the outline of these grave actions, reducing the issue to homosexuality in a very silly manner, as if, furthermore, homosexuality and abuse were synonymous". The statements, he said, "were an attempt to free from responsibility someone who took advantage of his position of power over more vulnerable persons".

Catholic Church titles
Preceded by Brendan Oliver Comiskey	— TITULAR — Titular Bishop of Thibilis; 18 December 1984 – 25 November 1987	Succeeded by André Armand Vingt-Trois
Preceded by Alejandro Durán Moreira	Bishop of Rancagua; 25 November 1987 – 16 April 1993	Succeeded by Francisco Javier Prado Aránguiz
Preceded by Francisco de Borja Valenzuela Ríos	Bishop of Valparaíso; 16 April 1993 – 21 June 1996	Succeeded by Francisco Javier Errázuriz Ossa
Preceded by Antonio María Javierre Ortas	Prefect of the Congregation for Divine Worship and the Discipline of the Sacraments; 21 June 1996 – 1 October 2002	Succeeded by Francis Arinze
Preceded by Jean Jérôme Hamer	Cardinal Deacon of San Saba; 21 February 1998 – 1 March 2008	Himself as Cardinal Priest
Preceded by Luigi Poggi	Cardinal Protodeacon; 24 February 2005 – 23 February 2007	Succeeded by Darío Castrillón Hoyos
Himself as Cardinal Deacon	Cardinal Priest 'pro hac vice' of San Saba; 1 March 2008 – 3 October 2021	Succeeded by Arthur Roche
