= Catholic Church in Chile =

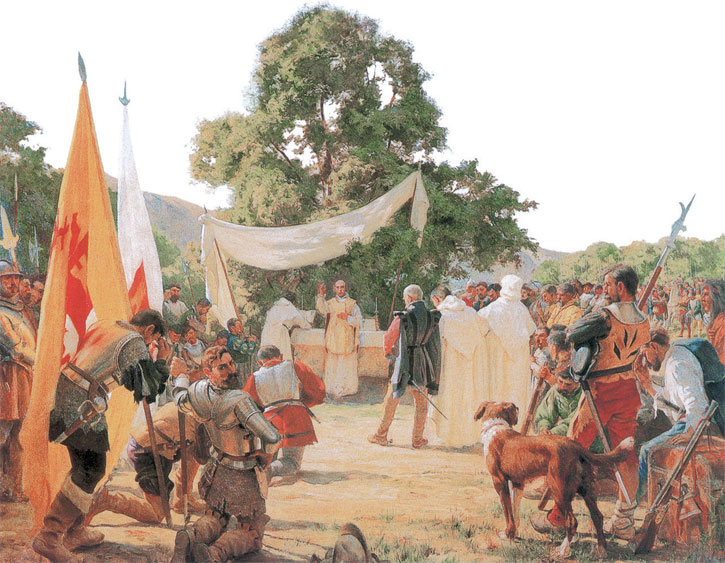
- The first Mass celebrated in Chile, by Pedro Subercaseaux
- Classification: Catholic Church
- Orientation: Latin
- Scripture: Holy Bible
- Theology: Catholic theology
- Polity: Episcopal
- Governance: CECH
- Pope: Leo XIV
- President: Fernando Chomalí Garib
- Apostolic Nuncio: Alberto Ortega Martín
- Region: Chile
- Language: Spanish, Latin
- Founder: Rodrigo González de Marmolejo
- Number of followers: 8,236,900 (2012)
- Official website: iglesia.cl

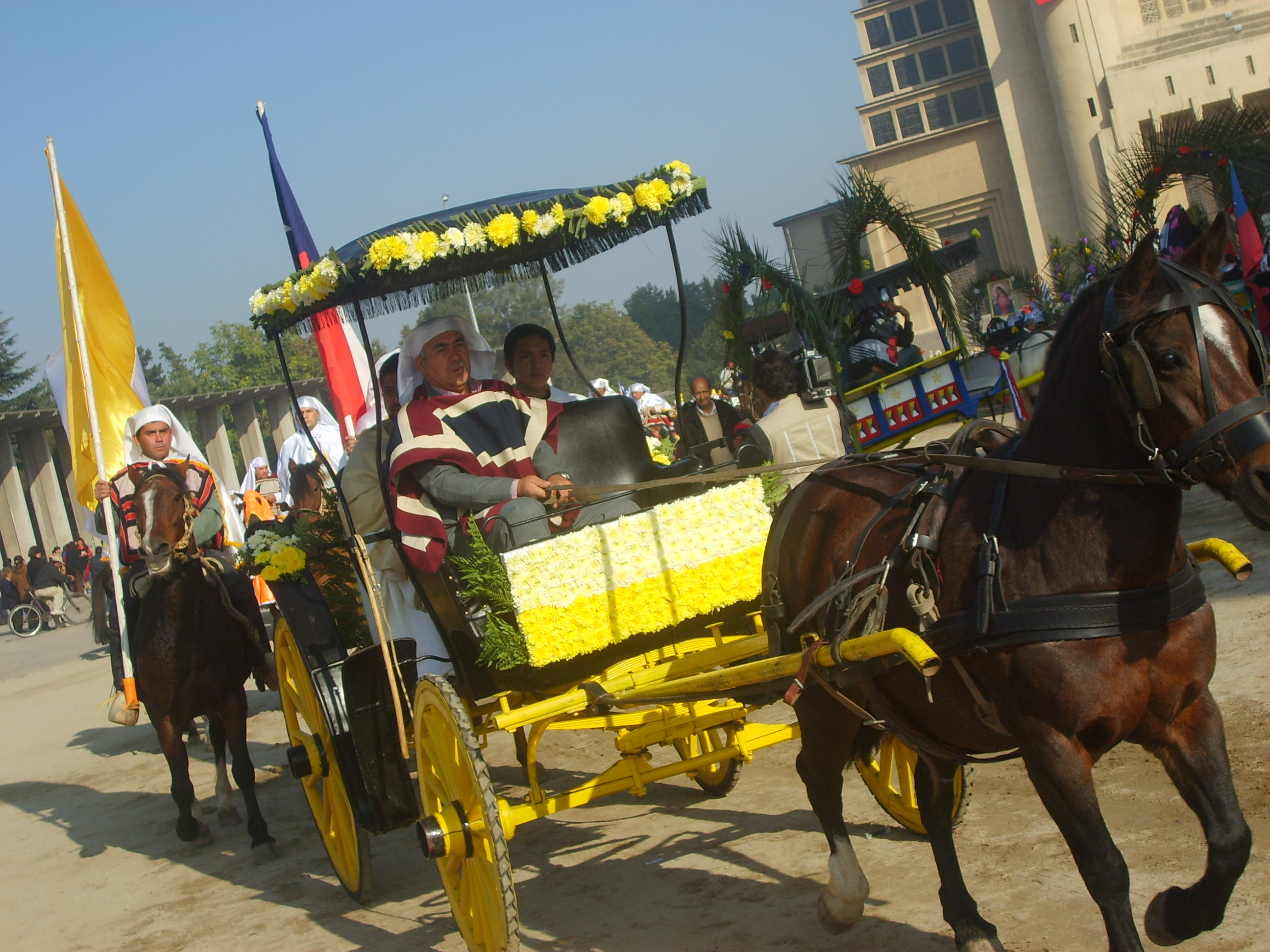
Cuasimodo Feast

The Catholic Church in Chile is part of the worldwide Catholic Church, under the spiritual leadership of the Pope, the curia in Rome, and the Episcopal Conference of Chile.

The Church is composed of 5 archdioceses, 18 dioceses, 2 territorial prelatures, 1 apostolic vicariate, 1 military ordinariate and a personal prelature (Opus Dei). The government observes the following Catholic Holy Days as national holidays (if on a week day): Good Friday, Christmas, Feast of the Virgin of Carmen, the Feast of the Immaculate Conception, the Feast of Saints Peter and Paul, the Feast of the Assumption, and All Saints Day.

The Catholic Church in Chile has had a complex relationship with the Chilean state, particularly during the latter half of the 20th century, with the government of Salvador Allende and the dictatorship of Augusto Pinochet. The influence of liberation theology and political ideologies also contributed to internal disagreements and changing Church attitudes.

In 2024, 54% of the Chilean population self-identified as Catholic in the census; last time religion was considered in the census, in 2002, it was 70% of the population. A report in 2021 indicated that this number had declined to 42%. The Catholic Church sexual abuse cases in Chile, especially the Karadima case which came to light in 2010 and led to Karadima's conviction in 2011, had a negative influence on Chilean public opinion of the Church. Chilean trust in the Catholic Church plummeted from 61% in 2010 to 38% in 2011, and 36% in 2017; the lowest of any Latin American country.

== History ==
Catholicism was introduced by Dominican and Franciscan friars who accompanied the Spanish colonialists in the 16th century. The first parish was established in 1547 and the first diocese in 1561. Most of the native population in the northern and central regions was evangelized by 1650. The southern area proved more difficult. Church activity was hindered during the campaign for independence (1810–18) and in the first years of the new government. In the 20th century, further success was impeded by a shortage of clergy and government attempts to control Church administration. Separation of Church and state was established by a new constitution in 1925.

=== The Church in the 1970s and 80s ===
==== Presidency of Salvador Allende ====
Relations between Church and state were complicated during the Socialist presidency of Salvador Allende (November 1970 − September 1973). While Allende and the state refrained from attacking the Church, the majority of the Catholic hierarchs in Chile were either ideologically opposed to Allende and his socialist program or cautious of open clerical involvement in politics. However, a vocal minority of priests, followers and participants of liberation theology, were supporters of the government. On April 16, 1971, a group of these priests, "The 80", released a declaration advocating for Catholics to actively participate in Allende's cause and the socialist program.

The 80 would subsequently form the organization Christians for Socialism. Other Catholic organizations were also a part of Allende's Popular Unity coalition, including the Christian Left and MAPU, which split off from the more centrist Christian Democratic Party. Previously, Catholic involvement in Chilean politics had been represented primarily by the Christian Democratic Party, which as a political organization was institutionally separate from the Church. In 1972, twelve members of Christians for Socialism were invited to visit Cuba by Fidel Castro, while there they spoke in support of socialist revolution. In April of that year, Christians for Socialism held a First Latin American Congress of Christians for Socialism in the city of Santiago; its focus was reflection on the activities of Christians who practiced liberation theology in Latin America. It was attended by laypeople, clergy, and a single hierarch, Mexican bishop Sergio Méndez Arceo. The Archbishop of Santiago, Cardinal Raúl Silva Henríquez, was invited but turned down the invitation because he believed Christians for Socialism was trying to push the Church into supporting communist revolution. In April, following the conference, the Chilean bishops issued two statements, one rebuking the statement of the twelve who went to Cuba, and the other treading a middle ground between respect for Allende and affirming his legitimacy, while maintaining a nominally apolitical stance and that Marxism was inconsistent with Catholicism.

During the Allende administration and immediately preceding it, supportive elements of the Chilean Catholic Church did not limit themselves to declarations of solidarity with the poor or the government—they also performed it through material acts. During this time, some nuns and priests were already living and working with the poor (as a result of evangelization efforts undertaken by the Church to address the widespread lack of clergy across Latin America or through their own volition) in order to better serve the people and understand their reality; one example took the form of Father Ignacio Pujadas, who formed a Christian Base Community in his neighborhood and was later a founding member of Christians for Socialism. Other groups of organizations such as Catholic Action and the Catholic Student Youth were already working towards similar goals as Christians for Socialism. Parts of the Church also voluntarily aided the Allende government: in 1971, the Society of the Sacred Heart gave the Chilean government some of its private high schools, and the Congregation of the Holy Cross raised tuition for rich students in their Santiago school to fund scholarships for poor students, both in accordance with Allende's project of increasing educational access.

==== Pinochet dictatorship ====
Under the military dictatorship of Augusto Pinochet, the relationship between Church and state became more adversarial. Most Catholic bishops and priests supported the regime initially, and the hierarchy formally condemned Christians for Socialism following the coup. However, by 1976, the dictatorship had lost the approval of the Catholic Church with the exception of the Military Vicariate, which continued to openly support the dictatorship and supplied theological justification for the coup to the troops. That year, under the leadership of the Archbishop of Santiago, Cardinal Raúl Silva Henríquez, the Church set up the Vicariate of Solidarity, a human rights organization where "everyone went for help once their loved ones vanished." The Vicariate of Solidarity gathered documentation of human rights violations and disappeared individuals, which was later used as evidence in truth commissions and court cases after the dictatorship. The Vicariate also provided support to victims and their friends and relations, circulated a confidential newsletter, and served as a sheltering organization for other opponents of Pinochet's regime. The Vicariate of Solidarity undertook more socially oriented projects as well, sponsoring creators of arpilleras, as well as the selling and exhibition of their work, and established soup kitchens and a clinic. The Vicariate was the successor to the Committee of Cooperation for Peace in Chile, founded by a collaboration between Archbishop Henriquez and other religious leaders on October 6, 1973. Despite being an ecumenical organization, the Committee's leadership was extensively drawn from the Catholic Church in Santiago. The Committee filled a similar role to the later Vicariate, but as it only had Catholic participation, it lacked the degree of respect and protection which the Vicariate would later enjoy as part of the Church structure, operating out of Church offices. The Committee was shut down in November of 1975 under threat of force from the junta, having been described by Pinochet as a vector of Marxist-Leninist subversion.

The legacy of Christians for Socialism, which the dictatorship had also suppressed, contributed to the Catholic Church's stance against the dictatorship and increasing involvement with the poor. As well, Christian Base Communities had a role in facilitating the widespread protests in Chile that began on May 11, 1983, and continued throughout the decade. Individual priests also played significant roles during the dictatorship, notably Father Pierre DuBois and Father André Jarlan, who worked together in the parish house of the La Victoria población where Jarlan was killed by police who fired at the building on September 4, 1984. Jarlan became a figure of national significance during the 1980s and even after his memory faded in the 1990s, he remained significant in La Victoria. Jarlan's image as a priest of the people was an example of the influence of liberationist Catholicism during the dictatorship.

== Demographics ==
Catholic demographics estimates
| Year | % Chileans self-identifying as Catholic |
| 2002 | 70% (2002 census) |
| 2007 | 73% (Latinobarómetro) |
| 2012 | 66.6% (2012 census) |
| 2017 | 45% (Latinobarómetro) |
| 2021 | 42% (Encuesta Nacional Bicentenario 2021) |
| 2024 | 53.7% (2024 census) |

== Catholic dioceses in Chile ==
Map of ecclesiastical jurisdictions of Chile.

The Catholic Church in Chile comprises five ecclesiastical provinces each headed by an archbishop. The provinces are in turn subdivided into 19 dioceses and 6 archdioceses each headed by a bishop or an archbishop. There is also one Territorial Prelature, one Apostolic Vicariate and one Military Ordinariate in Chile. The bishops of Chile form the Episcopal Conference of Chile.

== Education ==
There are six Catholic universities in the country: Catholic University of the Most Holy Conception, Catholic University of the Maule, Catholic University of the North, Pontifical Catholic University of Valparaíso, Temuco Catholic University and Pontifical Catholic University of Chile, ranked No. 1 university in Chile and No. 2 in Latin America, according to QS Latin American University Rankings.

Several religious orders sponsor a number of secondary and primary schools. One of the most famous is Saint George's College, run by the Congregation of Holy Cross. One third of the CEO's of the top 200 companies of Chile are alumni of Saint George's College.

== Episcopal conference ==
Episcopal Conference of Chile
- Conferencia Episcopal de Chile
- Abbreviation: CECh
- Formation: 1957
- Type: Episcopal conference
- Purpose: To support the ministry of bishops
- Headquarters: Santiago
- Region served: Chile
- Members: Active and retired Catholic bishops of Chile
- President: Fernando Chomalí
- Website: iglesia.cl

The Episcopal Conference of Chile (Spanish: Conferencia Episcopal de Chile, CECh) is an agency of the Catholic Church which includes all the Archbishops and Diocesan Bishops, the Diocesan Directors and all those equivalent in law to the diocesan bishops, the Military Bishop, the coadjutor and auxiliary and Headlines Bishops performing their functions within the Chilean territory conferred by the Holy See or the Episcopal Conference. This organization allows the Bishops jointly exercise certain pastoral functions in a collegial manner. Usually meet at Assembly where national contingency discuss issues or topics that are related to the development of the Catholic Church in Chile. Express their opinion through documents or letters that are made known to the public. Also connected with the Government, through the General Secretariat of the Presidency of the Republic.

This body is responsible for discerning proposed major guidelines regarding evangelization and religious education in Chile, which continuously focuses on topics like how to evangelize, the socio-economic problems the country and other short-term.

The President of the Conference is Bishop Santiago Jaime Silva Retamales, Military Ordinary Bishop of Chile. He was elected in 2016.

On 18 May 2018 every member of the Chilean Episcopal conference offered his resignation to Pope Francis after he had summoned them to Rome to discuss the sexual abuse scandal rocking the Chilean church. Unless and until the Pope accepts these resignations the members of the conference continue in their positions. By 28 June 2018, Pope Francis accepted the resignations of five of Chile's 34 Bishops. On 14 August 2018, Chilean police raided the headquarters of the Episcopal Conference.

List of conference presidents

- Jose Maria Caro (1957–1958)
- Alfredo Silva Santiago (1958–1962)
- Raúl Silva Henríquez (1962–1968)
- Jose Manuel Santos (1968–1971)
- Raúl Silva Henríquez (1971–1975)
- Juan Francisco Fresno (1975–1977)
- Francisco de Borja Valenzuela Ríos (1978–1979)
- Jose Manuel Santos (1980–1983)
- Bernardino Piñera (1984–1987)
- Carlos Gonzalez Cruchaga (1988–1992)
- Fernando Ruiz Ariztía (1993–1995)
- Carlos Oviedo Cavada (1995–1998)
- Ariztía Fernando Ruiz (1998)
- Francisco Javier Errazuriz Ossa (1999–2004)
- Alejandro Goic Karmelic (2004–2010)
- Ricardo Ezzati Andrello S.D.B. (2010–2016)
- Santiago Silva Retamales (2016–2021)
- Celestino Aós Braco (2021–2023)
- Fernando Chomalí Garib (2023–)

== See also ==
- Apostolic Nuncio to Chile
- Clergy removed from office
- Episcopal Conference of Chile
- List of Catholic dioceses in Chile
- Juventud Parroquial Chilena
- Latin American Episcopal Council (CELAM)
