= Sergio Otoniel Contreras Navia =

Chilean Catholic bishop (1926–2019)

- Bishop Emeritus of Temuco
- Church: Catholic Church
- Diocese: Diocese of Temuco
- In office: 23 December 1977 – 21 September 2001
- Predecessor: Bernardino Piñera
- Successor: Manuel Vial
- Previous posts: Apostolic Administrator of Valdivia (1995-1996); Titular Bishop of Semta (1974-1977); Auxiliary Bishop of Concepción (1974-1977); Bishop of San Carlos de Ancud (1966-1974)

Orders
- Ordination: 21 September 1957 by Rafael Lira Infante
- Consecration: 27 December 1966 by Emilio Tagle Covarrubias

Personal details
- Born: 27 April 1926 Valparaíso, Chile
- Died: 5 January 2019 (aged 92) Temuco, Chile

Sergio Otoniel Contreras Navia (27 April 1926 – 5 January 2019) was a Chilean Catholic bishop.

Contreras Navia was born in Chile and was ordained to the priesthood in 1957. He served as bishop of the Diocese of San Carlos de Ancud, Chile, from 1966 to 1974 and as auxiliary bishop of the Roman Catholic Archdiocese of Concepción, Chile. He served as bishop of the Roman Catholic Diocese of Temuco, Chile from 1977 to 2001.
