= Classical Quechua =

Historical forms of Quechua

- Imperial Quechua/Colonial Quechua
- Runasimi
- Native to: Inca Empire
- Region: Andean Region
- Ethnicity: Kingdom of Cusco
- Era: 14th to 16th century (Imperial Quechua); 16th to 17th century (Colonial Quechua)
- Language family: Quechuan: Quechua II; Quechua IIB/C; Classical Quechua
- Writing system: Quipus/ Latin script (Quechua alphabet)

Official status
- Official language in: Inca Empire

Language codes
- ISO 639-3: qwc
- Glottolog: clas1251

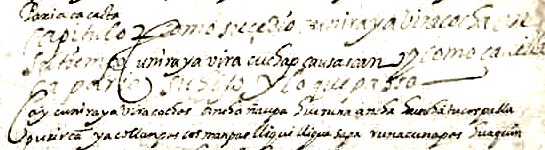
Huarochirí Manuscript: document in Classical Quechua. Cuniraya Viracuchap causascan (life of Cuniraya Viracucha): one s and one k (c/qu). In the Classical Quechua of Doctrina Christiana it would be cauçascan: one k, but ç vs. s. In Kichwa of Ecuador it would be kawsashka (without possessive suffix -n): one k, but s vs. sh. In modern Cuzco Quechua and Ayacucho Quechua it would be kawsasqan: k vs. q, but just one s. In Central Quechua it would be kawsashqan: k vs. q, s vs. sh (in some places: kawashqan with mute s).

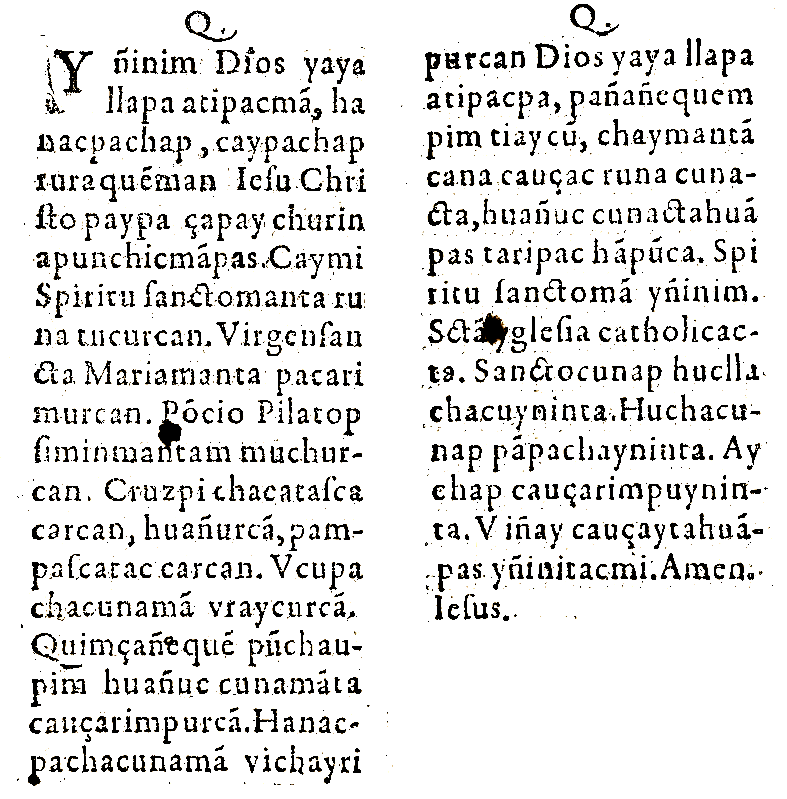
Apostles' Creed (Yñinim) in Doctrina Christiana, Lima 1584, in Classical Quechua: genitive with -p (caypachap, Pilatop), accusative with -cta (runacunacta), "our (incl.)" with -nchic (apunchicmãpas), -m (not -n: yñinim), ç (çapay) vs. s (chacatasca), one c/qu (just k, not k vs. q: carcan, quimçañequẽ), no ejectives (pampascatac, pũchaupim, no pp-), no aspirates (ucupachacunamã, no -cj-). In this text no present progressive is used, but in the Nicene Creed of 1631 the progressive form tiachcan is used.

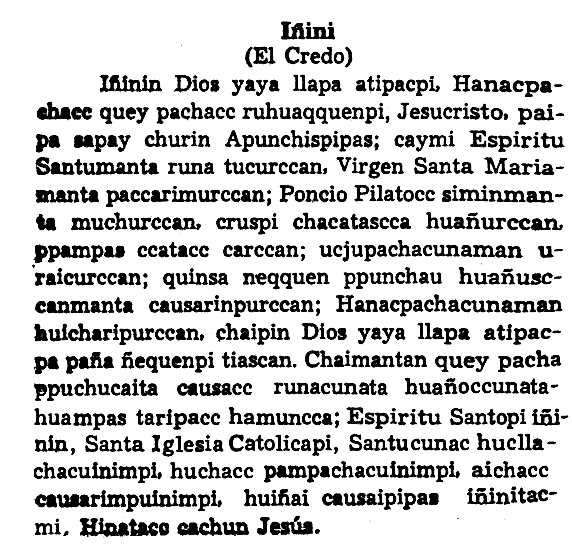
Apostles' Creed (Iñini) in Manual de catecismo quechua 1940, in modern Cuzco Quechua: genitive with -cc (quey pachacc, Pilatocc), accusative with -ta (runacunata), "our (incl.)" with -nchis (Apunchispipas), -n (not -m: iñinin), no ç (s the same in sapay and chacatascca), c/qu vs. cc/qqu (k vs. q: carccan, quinsa ñeqquen), ejectives (ppampasccatacc, ppunchau [today p'unchay], no p-), aspirates (ucjupachacunaman, no -c-), tiascan instead of tiachcan (today tiyashan)

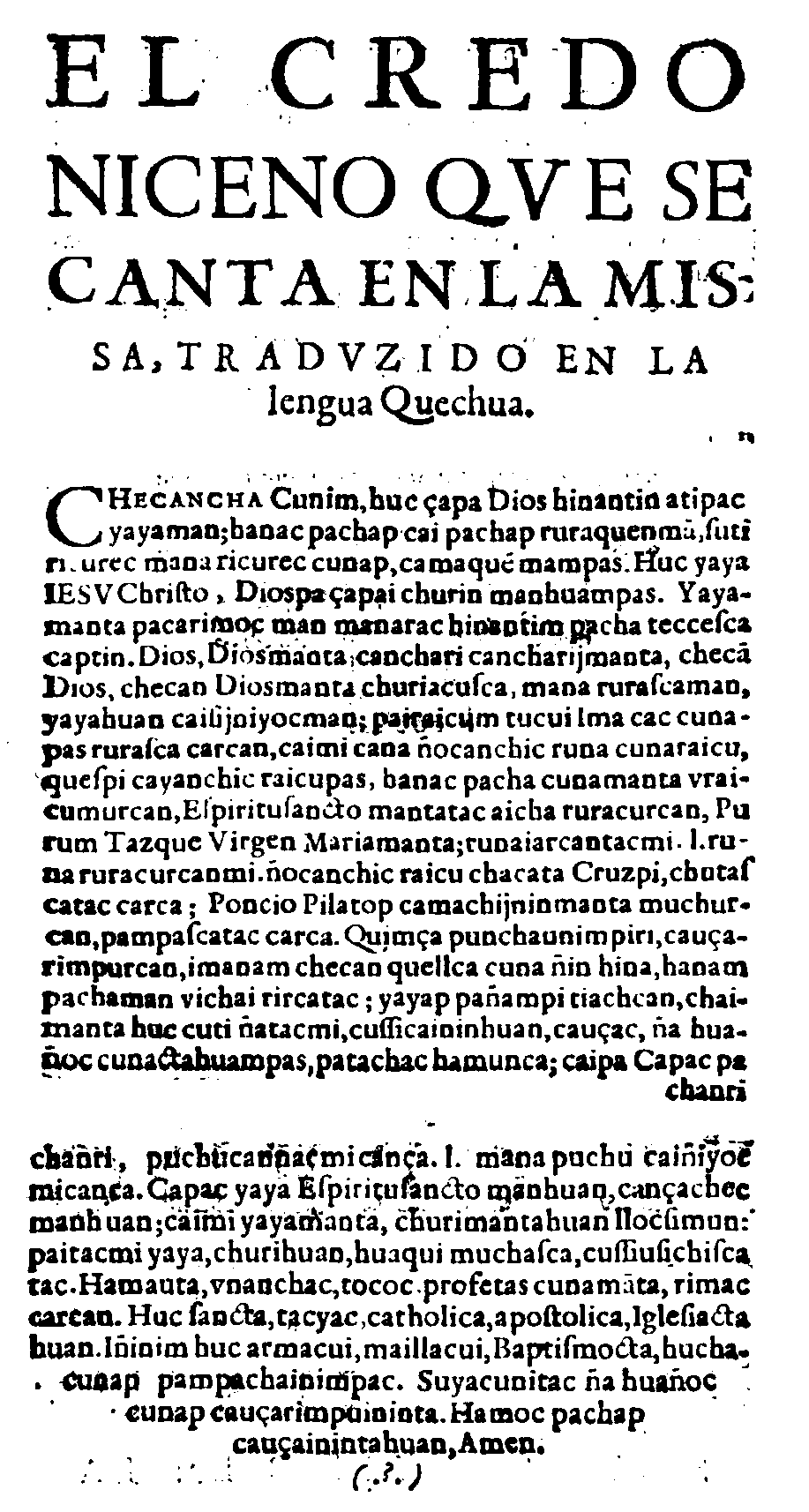
Nicene Creed in Ritual Formulario by Juan Pérez Bocanegra, 1631. Except for a change in orthography (ai, ui instead of ay, uy: cai, tucui) it has the same characteristics as the Quechua of Doctrina Christiana of 1584. In this text, the progressive form tiachcan is used, conserved in present Ayacucho Quechua as tiyachkan, whereas in modern Cuzco Quechua it is tiyashan.

Classical Quechua or lengua general del inga may refer to two historical forms of Quechua, the exact relationship and degree of closeness between which is controversial, and which have sometimes been identified with each other.

These are:

1. the variety of Quechua that was used as a lingua franca and administrative language in the Inca Empire (1438–1533) (henceforward Inca Lingua Franca; sometimes also referred to as Imperial Quechua). Since the Incas did not have writing (though some Quipus might have been narrative, following a logosyllabic pattern, according to some experts like Gary Urton and Sabine Hyland), the evidence about the characteristics of this variety is scant and they have been a subject of significant disagreements.
2. the variety of Quechua that was used in writing for religious and administrative purposes in the Andean territories of the Spanish Empire, mostly in the late 16th century and the first half of the 17th century and has sometimes been referred to, both historically and in academia, as lengua general 'common language' (henceforward Standard Colonial Quechua). It is Standard Colonial Quechua in this second sense that is abundantly attested in writing, notably in the famous Huarochirí Manuscript, and that this article primarily describes.

There are also some less common and typical uses of the term "classical" in reference to other Quechua varieties, whose relationship to the abovementioned ones is also controversial, namely:

1. In reference to all use of Quechua as a literary medium until the Túpac Amaru rebellion of 1780–1782, after which literature in Quechua was banned, although the language of most of the "Classical Quechua literature" written after the mid-17th century is more commonly seen as early Cuzco Quechua;
2. As "Classic Inca", in reference to the reconstructed ancestor of all Southern Quechua varieties ("Common southern Peruvian Quechua").

== The Inca lingua franca ==
For a long time, it was assumed that the variety of Quechua used as an administrative and court language by the Incas had been the one spoken in their capital Cuzco. The identification of Cuzco Quechua and especially some of its prestige sociolects as particularly refined and as a remnant of the Incas' language was commonplace in the late 16th and early 17th century. This identification was also traditionally maintained by the local elites and intellectuals in later centuries and continues to be advocated by the Cuzco Language Academy (Academia de la lengua quechua). Some modern scholars do believe that the Inca lingua franca was, indeed, a form of Southern Quechua (Quechua IIC), and thereby, in a way, a predecessor of the attested Cuzco dialect. They assume that it was like the modern Cuzco dialect and unlike the modern Ayacucho dialect in that it displayed numerous influences from the Aymara language, including aspirate and ejective consonants and numerous loanwords (possibly in turn because the Incas had spoken Aymara and/or Aymara-influenced Puquina before Quechua). This has also been used to explain why the highland Ecuadoran varieties in the north (Quechua IIB) have also acquired aspirates (albeit not necessarily in cognates of the Southern words with aspirates), presumably during the brief period of Inca rule there.

A more widespread view in the scholarly literature nowadays, however, is that the Inca lingua franca was actually based on a variety of Coastal Quechua spoken on the central-southern coast of Peru, which was rich, populous, had a strategic location and contained the important realms of Chincha and Pachacamac. The claim that this variety was chosen is mentioned explicitly in chronicles. Since that important area was depopulated after the conquest and came to be settled predominantly by Spaniards and Africans, leading to the extinction of Coastal Quechua, the dialect is not attested in later times.

It is sometimes thought that this dialect is identical to the one used in the earliest recorded Quechua grammar, vocabulary and texts by Dominican priest Domingo de Santo Tomás (1560). Alternatively, these works might partly reflect a different coastal dialect, that of Lima, or a mixture of the two, combined with elements from the nearby Central Quechua dialects. It does appear that Santo Tomás mixed words from several dialects, Southern and Central, in his works, while the morphology is predominantly Southern. It has also been claimed that some of the features of his variety are suggestive of affiliation with Quechua IIB (Northern Quechua).

It is thought, furthermore, that the Inca lingua franca is reflected in some of the Quechua words and phrases found in the early Spanish chronicles, especially the one of Juan de Betanzos from 1557, Summa y naración de los incas (in spite of its being recorded in Cuzco), and in early borrowings into Spanish, especially glosses expressing concepts connected to the Incas (see below).

This Inca lingua franca is considered to have had the following characteristics, of which the first and partly the last one are found in Santo Tomás's variety:

- the allophonic voicing of stops in front of nasals: inka > inga, kuntur > kundur > Spanish cóndor, anti 'east' > Spanish andi > Andes (a feature that was still attested in colonial times along the central coast near Lima, and is found to this day in northern Quechuan varieties);
- the tendency to drop word-final /q/ (e.g. the spelling Yaguar Guaca for the name of Yawar Waqaq);
- a word-initial change /r/ > /l/ (compare the name of Lima from lima-q < rima-q 'speaker, oracle')
- the use of the sound /ʃ/ that early Spanish sources rendered with the letter x (e.g. Quiquixana, Inca-related terms such as maxcapaycha for Mascapaicha and Xairi for Sairi (Túpac) in Oré's work, a few common words such as xuti for ŝuti in Santo Tomás) corresponding to the Colonial Classic Quechua ŝ, which was rendered with Spanish s.

A remarkable feature of Santo Tomás' orthography is the widespread use of the Spanish letters for open vowels e and o where such allophones are not to be expected in attested Quechua. It is not clear that this reflects some objective peculiarities of the variety. Further, in Santo Tomás' variety, the penultimate stress pattern that is nearly exceptionless in most other forms of Quechua is made significantly more complicated by various subrules taking into account morphological boundaries and syllable weight. The addition of enclitics, case suffixes and the 2nd person plural suffix -chik did not affect the stress of the word (e.g. máchu-lla 'only an old man', saynáta-kta 'mask (accusative)'), unlike the addition of the plural suffix -kúna; however, stress did end up on -chik if followed by another suffix (-chík-man), and the ablative ending -mánta received a separate primary stress; heavy antepenultimates attracted stress (e.g. túnquri 'Adam's apple'); the verbal inflection suffixes apparently tended not to affect the stress either, unless they contained a heavy syllable that ended up in non-final position, in which case the last such syllable was stressed (míku-ni 'I eat', mikú-ngi 'you (sg.) eat', miku-rqá-ngi 'you (sg.) ate').

There is some evidence that the Spanish, too, did initially use the Inca lingua franca or a related form of Coastal Quechua for religious and administrative purposes from the beginning of the conquest of Peru in 1532 until some point in the 1560s (for instance, using a pronunciation landi- instead of ranti- for 'to buy'). This changed as the variety went extinct. Ironically, many of its features came to be explicitly disparaged as vulgarisms in the linguistic appendix to the influential Quechua publications of the Third council of Lima in the 1580s.

== Standard Colonial Quechua ==
=== Origin ===
A standardised form of Quechua was codified in the religious texts produced by the Third Council of Lima (1582–1583) and published in 1584–1585, as well as in the associated anonymous grammar and dictionary published in 1586. More or less close written approximations of this variety were used for religious and administrative purposes during the rest of the 16th and at least the first half of the 17th century, although modifications of some details were by no means uncommon. The exact nature and origins of this variety and its relationship to the Inca lingua franca and to different Quechua regional dialects are somewhat controversial.

There is no doubt that Standard Colonial Quechua was a form of Quechua IIC, or Southern Quechua (although a minority view is that specifically the Manuscript of Huarochirí has features of Quechua IIB instead.). For instance, it has the 1st person subject suffix -ni rather than -y and the 1st person object -wa- rather than -ma-. It also expresses verbal number by means of the suffixes -ku and -chik. Accordingly, it can be seen as some sort of natural continuation of the Inca lingua franca, still essentially the same "Southern Peruvian Quechua", if the Inca koiné is assumed to have been a Cuzco dialect of type IIC, or it can be regarded as a distinct rupture according to the currently more common view that the Incas had used a different, Coastal Quechua variety.

In spite of the clear Southern dialectal basis, the codifiers of Standard Colonial Quechua claimed, and do appear, to have made an effort to select forms ensuring maximal intelligibility across the country, avoiding both elements that were unique to various deviant local dialects and those that were peculiar to what was considered prestigious aristocratic speech in Cuzco. Thus, they preferred the widespread word muchu- rather than the Cuzco-specific synonym allpari- for 'suffer', and aklla- instead of chikllu- for 'choose'. They also avoided Cuzco borrowings from Aymara or Puquina which may have been partly due to the Incas' own origins.

There is, however, a certain controversy about the exact relationship of Standard Colonial Quechua to the Cuzco dialect. The authors themselves stated that they were writing in the variety of Cuzco, and three of the four did appear to have their origins in the former Inca capital or the surrounding area. Authors such as Mannheim (1991: 142) and Durston (2007: 191–194) consider the Third Council norm to be, indeed, based on the dialect of Cuzco with small artificial modifications of the type mentioned above. In the orthography, the codifiers opted for not marking the aspirates and ejectives typical of Cuzco, contributing to the resemblance of the written form to the modern Ayacucho dialect. However, they explicitly motivated that strategy not as an accommodation of dialects lacking these sounds, but with the fact that "the meanings do not concur and the interpreters do not agree among themselves". In fact, not even the contrast between "k" and "q" was expressed, which some have connected with its loss in many northern Quechua varieties. In any case, both the principle of avoiding Cuzco-specific lexemes and the one of not marking the ejectives, the aspirates and the uvular-velar contrast were deviated from to some extent in many subsequently published texts in Standard Colonial Quechua that sought to reflect Cuzco usage more faithfully.

A different view is expressed by Itier (2000: 48, passim), who believes the Third Council norm to have been based on an innovative Southern Quechua koiné that had emerged spontaneously in the preceding decades in response to the development of the mining industry and urbanisation and was clearly distinct from the traditional and archaic (albeit prestigious) Cuzco dialect associated with the Inca past. He explains the fact that many of those using this lingua franca referred to it as 'the language of Cuzco' with the assumption that people meant a Southern Quechua variety in general. Some innovations found in this form did eventually spread to Cuzco Quechua as well.

Assuming that the Inca lingua franca had not, in fact, been a form of Southern Quechua, the choice of the latter as a basis for the standard language by the colonial authorities may have been partly connected to the fact that this variety was prevalent in the areas that were most important for the mining industry. An additional factor was the prestige of Cuzco: there are numerous references to the fact that by the time of the Third Council in the 1580s, it was Southern Quechua and specifically the dialect of Cuzco that was seen as the most refined and closest to the way the Incas had spoken, hence worthiest of being used to express 'lofty concepts'. The focus on Cuzco in particular is explicable in view of its status as the former Inca capital, which led to be it being seen as 'the Athens, the Rome and the Toledo of the Quechua language', as Oré put it in 1598. This identification of their own dialect with that of the Incas was also, by that time, part of the identity of the Cuzco elites. The contrast between the Coastal Quechua of Juan de Betanzos's chronicle of 1557 and the Southern Quechua of Cristóbal de Molina from 1575 may suggest that the indigenous nobility had abandoned the old lingua franca and switched to the local dialect in the intervening period.

Again, depending on whether Standard Colonial Quechua is seen as a form of Cuzco Quechua or not, the transition to the language of classical Quechua drama (mid 17th – late 18th century) can be seen as an extinction and replacement of one written language by another or as a smooth and natural transition to later forms of the Cuzco dialect.

=== Use ===
Standard Colonial Quechua was adopted as an instrument of proselytisation by the Catholic Church, following a general policy of using vernaculars in religious instructions as advocated by the Council of Trent (1545–1563) in connection with the Counter-Reformation. Efforts to use some form of Quechua for religious purposes began in the 1540s at the latest, predating significantly the attested Standard Colonial Quechua standard. The earliest doctrinal texts and a dictionary, now lost, were written by Juan de Betanzos in Cuzco, apparently on commission of the Spanish Crown. Other individual initiatives appear to have occurred, and the First Council of Lima (1551–1552) seems to have approved of certain Quechua Christian texts which may have been in the variety of Domingo Santo Tomás and even to have included the sermon and general confession prayer that he includes in his 1560 work. At the same time, a chaplaincy was established in Lima cathedral, providing a stipend for a cleric to regularly preach in 'the Indian language' (presumably Quechua) there. Another Quechua catechism is known to have been produced by the Jesuits in Lima by 1569, and yet another set of texts was being worked on by them around 1576.

At the same time, a parallel effort was going on in Cuzco. In 1567, there were already officially approved Quechua religious texts that priests were instructed to use in the Diocese of Cuzco. These were revised in 1573, reportedly involving the introduction of some sort of diacritics by Melchor del Aguila. In the 1570s, Cristóbal de Molina was a notable Quechua-speaking preacher in the city; he would go on to write a famous chronicle in 1575.

To ensure that priests learnt Quechua, a teaching chair was founded at the Lima Cathedral in 1571. In the late 1570s, competence in Quechua was made obligatory for priests in Peru in order to ensure effective proselytisation and doctrinal purity, and a Quechua chair was established at Lima's University of San Marcos with the function of not only offering courses in Standard Colonial Quechua, but also conducting examinations that certified competence in Quechua – essentially licensing for priestly office. Already in the 1580s, this monopoly was revoked and various other bodies and experts were entrusted with performing such linguistic licensing for locations distant from Lima – notably, in Cuzco.

Once established by the Third Council of Lima (1582–1583), Standard Colonial Quechua is known to have been used in sermons in and in teaching and is reported to have been widely understood and to have enjoyed significant prestige, reportedly even leading to dialect shift among rural Quechua speakers in contact with the urban centres. Besides its clerical use, Standard Colonial Quechua was the primary native vehicle of written communication, seen in personal letters and, to some extent, in legal and administrative contexts such as the writing of petitions and titles to land and office. However, unlike Nahuatl in Mexico, Quechua was almost never used in notary records, with only two fragments surviving, possibly because of a 1576 ban on mestizos' occupying the office of notary.

The standard is reported to have been understood to some extent in most of the country, including the Central Quechua areas as well, although the degree of competence in it was smaller in lower social strata and women. Some linguists have argued that much of the current spread of Southern Quechua throughout the Southern Peruvian highlands and the displacement of other native languages by it was only achieved in the colonial period due to its promotion by the Spanish authorities or economic activity, whereas others have contended that the significance of these factors was probably small and that the Southern Quechua area must have been homogeneous since before the Spanish Conquest.

After the Third Council of Lima, all authors adhered to its standard in most aspects, but only few did so entirely faithfully without making any noticeable modifications: according to Alan Durston's assessment, the latter may hold true only of the works of Pablo de Prado and Diego de Torres Rubio. In fact, when Alonso Martínez, a member of the Third Council translation team, attacked Alonso Huerta in 1613 for deviating from the Third Council standard, this did not prevent Huerta from using Archbishop Lobo Guerrero's patronage to inherit Martínez' university chair after the latter's death in 1614. The modifications that most post-Third Council authors made followed two principal tendencies.

One of these was to reflect more closely and consistently the speech of Cuzco (often Aymara-influenced, possibly connected to the Incas' own Aymara linguistic background). The most typical examples of this trend are the works of Diego González Holguín (1607–1608) and Juan Pérez Bocanegra (1631), although César Itier also believes it to be present in Alonso de Huerta (1616) and Torres Rubio (1619). In some respects, it seems that these authors were drawing on the traditions of Cuzco's pre-Third Council literary and linguistic project, whose production has not survived. Specifically the practice of representing the ejectives and aspirates characteristic of Cuzco was also adopted by Luis Jerónimo de Oré (1598), Batolomeo Jurado Palomino (1646), Juan Avendaño (1648) and Francisco de Ávila (1648), so it can even be said to have become 'the norm' in the 1640s. In spite of such elements, especially Oré's work is very close linguistically to that of the Third Council, as is that of Diego de Molina (1649).

Another tendency was to adapt the language of the texts that were to be used in the Central Quechua-speaking (Chinchaysuyu) areas by including elements from these dialects. This tendency was especially popular among natives of Huánuco and around the colonial capital Lima, which was located close to Central Quechua territory. Its primary advocate was Alonso de Huerta (1616), who held the cathedral and university chairs of Quechua in Lima for many years (the first from 1592 and the second from around 1614 to the mid or late 1630s). This Central Quechua tendency is expressed, albeit inconsistently, in the works of Luis Jerónimo de Oré (1598), Francisco de Ávila (1648), Juan Avendaño (1648), Diego de Molina (1649), and, most extensively, by Juan Castromonte (1651?). Huerta, Molina and Castromonte also made, like Holguín, an effort to distinguish between /k/ and /q/ in their spelling.

These different approaches clashed, in particular, in a debate in the late 1640s about the use of the Cuzco-based Standard Colonial Quechua in areas speaking Central Quechua ('the language of Chinchaysuyo'). Some argued that priests working in these areas needed to acquire competence in Central Quechua in order to be able to communicate properly with the parishioners, while others objected by asserting that the standard variety was sufficiently comprehensible there and was more refined, closer to the Incas' speech and thus more appropriate for its purpose.

By the middle of the 17th century, the countrywide use of Standard Colonial Quechua declined. At the time, Spanish authorities switched to a policy of Hispanicisation and suppression of indigenous languages, which was mandated as early as the 1630s, but was enforced inconsistently. The policy shift was reflected in a halt of publications of original linguistic work on Quechua (although occasional reprints continued) after the middle of the century, and a general loss of interest by the Church and the State alike in developing a literature in Quechua. The requirements for priests to have competence in Quechua became ever less stringent from the same time on and the cathedral Quechua chair in Lima was closed in 1694. An effort was made to reverse this policy only a hundred years later, in 1754, by the archbishop of Lima, Pedro Antonio de Barroeta y Ángel, as well as by the Sixth Council of Lima in 1772.

The reasons for the mid-17th century change are unclear. One possible cause that has been adduced is the increasing tendency of Indians to leave the Indian reductions and to avoid the services of priests by performing the Christian rituals themselves within so-called fraternities (cofradías). There was also a growing perception that the Christianisation of the indigenous people was already as complete as it was realistic to expect. Some contributing factors may have been a controversy regarding the linguistic and theological quality of Quechua-language preaching that took place in the 1650s, and an official Hispanisation policy that the Spanish monarchy embarked on in the 1680s.

Remarkably, this did not lead to a disappearance of written Quechua literature, but only to a shift of focus. From the mid 17th century, it came to be dominated by clearly regional varieties, above all by Cuzco Quechua, which were now promoted by the elites of that city, who sought their legitimisation in the Inca past. Indeed, this resulted in something of a Quechua literary renaissance and golden age, which was expressed specifically in playwriting. The language of the classical Quechua drama of that period is recognisable as distinctively Cusco–Collao Quechua because of the various innovations, especially the lenitions, which increasingly set it apart both from Standard Colonial Quechua as well as from other Southern Quechua varieties. Indian Quechua speakers also produced their own informal devotional texts in manuscript form, partly continuing the tradition of the official ecclesiastical literature of the classical period. During the same period, in addition to the reeditions of older works re-oriented towards Central Quechua, the first religious texts composed specifically in the Quechua varieties of modern Ecuador (by Luis Francisco Romero, 1725, 1753) and Bolivia (by Juan Antonio Dávila Morales, 1739) appeared. This efflorescence was ended by the defeat of the Tupac Amaru rebellion of 1780, which resulted in a severe crackdown on Quechua use, including an explicit ban on Quechua literature and theatre and the abolition of the chair of Quechua at the University of San Marcos.

=== Comparison with modern Quechua dialects ===
In the phonology, Standard Colonial Quechua differs from modern Southern Quechua dialects, but not from those of other regions, by still distinguishing two different sibilants: s and ŝ. The lenition of syllable-final consonants that is typical of modern Cuzco-Collao Quechua (/k/ after front vowels > /tʃ/ > /ʃ/ > /s/, /t/ > /s/, /p/ > /ɸ/ > /χ/, /q/ > /χ/, /w/ > /y/, /r/ > /ɹ/) had not yet taken place in the language of the Third Council or in that of the Huarochirí Manuscript: thus, the second-person plural is /-chik/, not /-chis/, and the progressive aspect ending is /-chka/, not /-sha/. This makes it more phonologically similar to the modern Ayacucho dialect, where these changes have not taken place. From Juan de Aguilar's grammar of 1691, the first clear signs of such lenition in Cuzco Quechua begin to appear, and later texts display various stages in the process. Other Cuzco changes that had not yet taken place in Standard Colonial Quechua were: (1) the rule that makes the suffixes /-yku/ and /-rqu/ lose their consonants and replace the vowel /u/ with /a/ before the suffixes /-mu/, /-pu/ and /chi/; (2) the replacement of the nasal /ɲ/ and word-final /m/ in some morphemes with the unmarked /n/. Finally, the euphonic /ni/ that is inserted before suffixes after consonant-final stems had an allomorph /i/ before /q/, /ŝ/ and /r/, which is absent in modern Cuzco Quechua. On the other hand, already in Standard Colonial Quechua times, there was a dialectal difference between the presence of ejective and aspirated stops in Cuzco due to Aymara influence and their absence in other varieties, and both options were accommodated within the literary standard.

In the morphology, it can be noted that the accusative suffix in Standard Colonial Quechua still has the archaic shape -kta after a vowel as opposed to the modern generalised -ta. There is no special narrative/mythical past tense using the verbal suffix -ŝqa, as the latter is still used almost only as a past participle ending, although some early instances of 'perfect' compound use can be found.

=== Attestation and texts ===
Juan de Betanzos' chronicle Summa y naración de los incas (1557) contains some Quechua words which appear to reflect a variety of Coastal Quechua and not Southern Quechua, in spite of having been written in Cuzco. In 1560, a grammar and a dictionary, including Christian religious texts, in what was probably also a variety of Coastal Quechua (with apparent Southern as well as Central lexical elements and even some Northern ones according to some authors) were published by Dominican priest Domingo de Santo Tomás as early as 1560 under the titles Grammatica o Arte de la lengua general de los Indios de los Reynos del Perú and Lexicón o Vocabulario de la lengua general del Perú.

Short texts and passages in Quechua, especially ritual texts reported to date from Inka times, are found in Spanish-language chronicles by four authors of partly indigenous origins. The first one, by Cristóbal de Molina el Cuzqueño (Fabulas y Ritos de los Incas, 1575) has been considered the earliest unambiguous attestation of Southern Quechua. The other three were written after the establishment of Standard Colonial Quechua. The authors were Inca Garcilaso de la Vega (Comentarios reales de los Incas, 1609), Felipe Guaman Poma de Ayala (El primer nueva corónica y buen gobierno, around 1610) and Juan de Santa Cruz Pachacuti Yamqui Salcamaygua (Relación de las antigüedades deste Reyno del Perú, around 1613, where the quotes from the ritual texts are associated with each of the Inkas). The authenticity of these prayers has been disputed.

It was the publications associated with the Third Council of Lima in 1583–1586 that codified Standard Colonial Quechua. The body of work exemplifying the recommended variety was the trilingual collection (in Spanish, Quechua and Aymara), entitled Doctrina Christiana (1584–1585) and composed of three volumes: two catechisms in dialogue form – a shorter and a longer one – and a collection of 31 sermons discussing the Sacraments and the Ten Commandments. The Third Council's translations of basic prayers and Christian expressions remain standard in Quechua to this day, albeit with the necessary dialect modifications. The religious texts were complemented by a grammar and a dictionary, both of which were published anonymously in 1586 and printed in Lima by Antonio Ricardo (specifically summoned from Mexico for this purpose). The latter essentially remained the standard ones for the Standard Colonial Quechua period and were later re-published in revised forms three times, in 1603, 1604 (published under the name of Alonso Martínez, a member of the Third Council translation team) and 1614. Two of the four translators, Francisco Carrasco and Bartolomé de Santiago, were mestizos originally from Cuzco and the linguistically close Arequipa, respectively, while Alonso Martínez had spent some time first in Central Quechuan Huaylas and then in Cuzco, and Juan de Balboa was a native of Lima, but probably acted as a supervisor or figurehead.

These were only the beginning of a long series of publications of Quechua ecclesiastical texts that continued for more than half a century – the production was very copious, many texts survive in print and manuscript copies and even more are known to have existed. About fifteen years after the Third Council, the Symbolo Católico Indiano (1598) was published by Luis Jerónimo de Oré in a language close, yet not entirely identical to that of the Third Council. It consisted of a collection of seven Christian religious chants in Quechua with partial translation in Latin and, again, trilingual versions of the Ten Commandments, some prayers, the Ten Commandments, the Sacraments, confessions and a short catechisis. An isolated anonymous sermon La Plática que se ha de hazer a los indios en la predicacion de la Bulla de la Santa Cruzada (1600) is composed in the Third Council variety as well. Another important text is the Ritual Formulario (1631) by Juan Pérez Bocanegra, which consists mostly of bilingual questionnaires dealing with the Sacraments, the Commandments and different religious 'errors'. It is written in a more Cuzco-influenced variety than that of the Third Council. and is notable for containing a detailed discussion of Quechua kinship terms, complete with a diagram. In 1641, a Directorio espiritual en la lengua española, y quichua general del inga was published by Pablo de Prado. A Catechismus Quichuensis was published in 1646 by Bartolomeo Jurado Palomino. More collections of sermons were published by Fernando de Avendaño in 1648 (Sermones de los Misterios de Nuestra Santa Fe Católica), Francisco de Ávila (posthumously) in the same year (Tratado de los Evangelios, bilingual) and Diego de los Cobos Molina in 1649 (Sermones de la Cuaresma). Finally, somewhere between 1650 and 1653, a ritual book entitled Aptaycachana was written by Juan de Castromonte, although the many Central Quechua elements and the author's own designation of its language as Chinchaysuyo (i.e. Central Quechua) mean that it can only partly be seen as a specimen of Standard Colonial Quechua.

Among texts usually regarded as specimens of Standard Colonial Quechua, by far the most famous and significant in terms of content is the Huarochirí Manuscript (variously dated to 1598 or 1608), produced by indigenous informants under the directions of Francisco de Ávila, which describes the indigenous myths and religious practices of the province of that name. While it generally adheres closely to the Third Council's standard and is identified as belonging to Quechua IIC, it exhibits, in addition, some features resulting from the influence of Aru, which was probably the mother tongue of the editor. Alternative views are that the language of the Huarochiri Manuscript actually belongs to Quechua IIB (Northern Quechua) or that its dialectal provenience is uncertain. Another notable source are the so-called Cotahuasi Letters, written in 1616 by local cacique Cristóbal Castillo. At least a dozen legal-administrative documents and private letters authored by Indians in Standard Colonial Quechua have also been discovered.

After the 17th century, there were very sporadic new official efforts to produce ecclesiastical texts in Quechua. In 1705, Gaspar Manuel published a re-edition of Pablo de Prado's 1641 Directorio espiritual, adding many new texts from various sources and, in one case, a long passion hymn Romances de la passion de N. Señor Iesu Christo that is not found in any previous source. This work can still be identified as largely Standard Colonial Quechua, although its date of origin is outside of the 'classical' period in the strict sense. Finally, towards the end of the colonial period, a new translation of a catechism into Quechua was published on the orders of the Sixth Council of Lima in 1773 along with a reedition of the Third Catechism of the Third Council's Doctrina Christiana. At the same time, the tradition had an offshoot in the informal production of devotional manuscripts by indigenous Quechua speakers that became abundant in the 18th century: they contained mostly copies of earlier texts, but also some apparently new litanies and translations of psalms and hymns. They clearly reflect the changes that had taken place in the regional dialects of their origin by that time: Quaderno de directorio espiritual is a specimen of Cuzco Quechua and a similar Untitled Devotionary exemplifies Ayacucho Quechua.

In the first half of 17th century, many other grammars and dictionaries were produced: Diego González Holguín (1607–1608, Alonso de Huerta (1616), Diego de Torres Rubio (1619) – all three using clearly Cuzco-influenced language – and Rojo Mejía y Ocón (1648). After a significant hiatus a small renaissance occurred at the turn of the century with the grammars of Juan de Aguilar (1690) and Estevan Sancho de Melgar (1691), as well as the 1701 revised re-edition of Torres Rubio's grammar by Juan de Figueredo. These late grammars reflect a language stage noticeably different from Standard Colonial Quechua, since the ones by Aguilar and Melgar reflect regional innovations that had taken place in the meantime in the Cuzco dialect, whereas the one by Figueredo had an added focus on Central Quechua (Chinchaysuyo). An even greater focus on Central Quechua was present in the third edition of Torres Rubio's grammar in 1754 with notes by Bernardo de Zubieta y Rojas.

From the middle of the 17th to the late 18th century, an indigenous literary renaissance flourished in Cuzco, resulting in the composition of a number of Quechua dramas on historical and religious subjects, partly of native and partly of European inspiration. These include Auto Sacramental del robo de Proserpina y sueño de Endimión (about 1644) and Auto Sacramental del Hijo Pródigo (about 1650) by Juan de Espinosa Medrano (el Lunarejo), as well as three dramas thought to have been composed between the late 17th and the late 18th century, in this likely chronological order: El pobre más rico (late 17th or early 18th century) by Gabriel Centeno de Osma, Uska Paukar and El milagro del rosario (Anonymous, middle of the 18th century) and by far the most famous Quechua drama, Ollantay (Anonymous, sometimes attributed to Antonio Valdez; Justiniani codex from the 1770s–1780s, Sahuaraura codex from 1838, but representing a more archaic linguistic stage than the Justiniani manuscript). While these dramas are also seen as belonging to the classical period of Quechua literature, their linguistic basis was clearly more decidedly local and specific to Cuzco than that of previous works, and they display a gradually increasing amount of linguistic innovations specific to later Cuzco Quechua – in particular, extensive lenitions. In fact, it appears that the supraregional Standard Colonial Quechua standard as codified by the Third Council gradually fell out of use in roughly the same period as the one when the Golden Age of Quechua theatre began. For this reason, the dramas have sometimes been described as more or less archaic specimens of Cuzco Quechua rather than of Standard Colonial Quechua in the narrow sense of the word.

== Phonology ==
There were three vowel phonemes:

Vowel phonemes of Standard Colonial Quechua
	front	central	back
close	i		u
open		a	

However, the vowels /i/ and /u/ were opened to [e] and [o] when preceding or following the uvular consonant /q/ (see below). Thus, quĉa 'lagoon' is pronounced [qot͡ʂa], and qillqay 'to write' is [qeʎqaj].

The consonants are as follows:

		labial	dental	alveolar/ retroflex	palatal	velar	uvular	laryngeal
nasals		m	n		ɲ			
plosives/ affricates	plain	p	t	(t͡ʂ)	t͡ʃ	k	q	
plosives/ affricates	aspirated	(pʰ)	(tʰ)		(t͡ʃʰ)	(kʰ)	(qʰ)	
plosives/ affricates	ejective	(pʼ)	(tʼ)		(t͡ʃʼ)	(kʼ)	(qʼ)	
fricatives			s	ʂ / s̪ / ʃ				h
liquids	laterals		(l)		ʎ			
liquids	trills			r				
semivowels		w			j			

The exact pronunciation of the phoneme designated /ʂ/ is uncertain and controversial. It may have been a retroflex according to Gerald Taylor. It originates from a Proto-Quechua phoneme reconstructed as /ʃ/, but there is some explicit testimony that Standard Colonial Quechua did not have a [ʃ] sound resembling the Spanish pronunciation of the grapheme x at the time; instead, the /ʂ/ was identified with the Spanish pronunciation of s, but not of z and c. In the Spanish varieties that pronounced these two letters in different ways before about 1650, the distinction was one of a more retracted, alveolar place of articulation ([s̪]) of the sound spelt /s/ and a more advanced, dental place of articulation ([s̺]) of the sound spelt z, c and ç. The distinction was gradually lost in Southern Quechua in the course of the 17th century, as the orthography of the attested texts shows.

It has been hypothesised that, like modern Cuzco Quechua (and unlike Ayacucho Quechua), Standard Colonial Quechua also had an ejective and, possibly, also an aspirate series of stops and affricates corresponding to the plain ones, but the orthography of the colonial period generally did not express them. In addition, it is clear that there was dialectal variation. In the 17th century, the Cuzco dialect was said to be characterised by an especially 'guttural' sound and appears to have already had the ejective and aspirate series it has today – they were occasionally expressed in the orthography by some writers, albeit inconsistently. On the other hand, they are not designated at all in the Huarochirí manuscript and many other texts.

The retroflex affricate [t͡ʂ] is reconstructed for Proto-Quechua, but usually not for Standard Colonial Quechua. It has merged with [t͡ʃ] in most modern Southern dialects. According to Gerald Taylor, it is unclear whether /t͡ʂ/ existed as a separate phoneme in Standard Colonial Quechua as a whole, but it seems likely that it was present at least in the idiolect of the editor of the Huarochirí manuscript.

== Orthography ==
The original colonial orthography was based on Spanish and did not express all the phonemes of the language adequately. The spelling did not distinguish /q/ from /k/, designating both in the same way as /k/ in Spanish, i.e. as c before back vowels and qu before front vowels. Exceptionally, /q/ could be expressed by some authors as a geminated cc, k, qq or with a ^ mark above the sign for /k/. The colonial orthography did, on the other hand, express the allophonic opening of the vowels /i/ and /u/ adjacent to /q/ with the spellings e and o from the Third Council onwards. The sounds /s/ and /ʂ/ were also distinguished, as the former was expressed by the letters z and ç, while the latter was expressed by the letter s and the digraph ss. The ejectives and aspirates, when marked at all, could be expressed by gemination. The latter practice became predominant in the 1640s. The digraph hu- was used to express syllable-initial w- (Santo Tomás had instead written gu-); e.g. huaca for waka.

Most descriptions of the variety and editions of texts in it use the new orthography established for Quechua in Peru. While still similar to Spanish in the way it expresses /t͡ʃ/ as ch, /ɲ/ ñ and /ʎ/ as ll, respectively, this system does distinguish between /k/ as k and /q/ as q, and uses h only to express the sound /h/.

In addition to the standard letters of modern Quechua orthography, Gerald Taylor's academic normalisation of Standard Colonial Quechua supplies the letters ŝ and ĉ respectively for the consonants /ʂ/ and /t͡ʂ/, which are merged with /s/ and /t͡ʃ/ in most modern Southern dialects (Cuzco Quechua does distinguish the two sibilants /s/ and /ʃ/, but the latter has arisen secondarily through later sound changes). Taylor does not, however, believe that the editor of the Huarochirí manuscript had the distinction between /s/ and /ʂ/ in his own speech, but rather that it was a feature of the Standard Colonial Quechua variety that he was trying to emulate (he expresses some doubts even on this subject, unlike most scholars).

Thus, the overall normalised orthography used in Taylor's editions and the historical orthography can be summarised as follows:

normalised orthography	phoneme	colonial spelling
ch	t͡ʃ	ch
ĉ	t͡ʂ	ch
h	h	h
i	i	i, e for allophonic [e]
k	k	c before back vowels, qu before front vowels
l	l	l
ll	ʎ	ll
m	m	m
n	n	n
ñ	ɲ	ñ
p	p	p
q	q	like /k/ (sometimes cc, k, qq, ĉ, q̂)
r	r	r
s	s	z or ç before back vowels, c before front vowels
ŝ	ʂ / s̪ / ʃ	s, ss
t	t	t
u	u	u, o for allophonic [o]
w	w	hu (early gu)
y	j	y, i
Ch	Cʰ	C (sometimes CC)
C'	Cʼ	C (sometimes CC)

Stress was located on the penultimate syllable. However, there are exceptions, such as the particle -ĉ(á), which expresses conjecture and receives the stress in spite of forming the last syllable of a phrase.

== Grammar ==
The morphology of Quechua is highly synthetic, agglutinative and relatively regular and tends to mark both dependents and heads. Dependents generally precede their heads.

=== Morphophonology ===
A number of suffixes have two versions – one that occurs after consonants and one after vowels. Sometimes the difference is that the postconsonantal allomorph has the shape -CV(C), whereas the postvocalic one has only the initial consonant -C: e.g. wasi-m 'house-affirmative', but ñan-mi 'path-affirmative', ñan-pa(q) 'path-genitive', but wasi-p 'of the house'. Another possibility is that the postvocalic allomorph begins in two consonants, whereas the postconsonantal one has only the second one: wasi-kta 'house-accusative', but ñan-ta 'path-accusative'. In still other cases, the postconsonantal allomorph differs from the postvocalic one in that it is preceded by the 'euphonic element' -ni- (or, in especially Cuzco-influenced texts, the more archaic -ñi-): e.g. wasi-y 'my house', but ñan-niy 'my path', ĉunka isqun-niyuq 'nineteen', ĉunka suqta-yuq 'sixteen'. Most Standard Colonial Quechua outside of the Huarochirí manuscript has the variant -i- after the consonants -q, -r and -ŝ as well: e.g. yawar-i-y 'my blood', where the Haurochirí manuscript has yawar-ni-y. In the rest of this article, the element that is sometimes absent (the vowel and possibly a following consonant in the first type of alternation and the syllable -ñi/ni in the other) will be written between parentheses: -m(i), -(k)ta, -p(aq), -(ni)y.

=== Nominal morphology ===
==== Nouns ====
The overall structure of the noun phrase is as follows:

root	possessive pronominal marker	plural marker	case marker	discourse particles

==== Possessive pronominal markers ====
The possessive pronominal markers are:

	singular	plural
1st person	-(ni)y	-(ni)y-ku -(ni)n-chik
2nd person	-(ni)yki	-(ni)yki-chik
3rd person	-(ni)n	-(ni)n-ku

For the occurrence of the element -(ni)-, see the Morphophonology section. Possession is marked both on the dependent and on the head: the noun phrase expressing the possessor is inflected in the genitive, whereas the possessed noun phrase receives a possessive pronominal suffix of the appropriate person (see the section Pronouns below): e.g. warmi-p wasi-n 'the woman's house'.

==== Number ====
The plural is formed with the postposed marker -kuna: wamra-kuna 'children'. Its use is not obligatory and it is generally absent after numerals and the word achka 'a lot'.

==== Case ====
The following case markers are added at the end of the noun phrase:

Standard Colonial Quechua case markers
case	marker
genitive	-pa(q) after a consonant; -p after a vowel
accusative (also functions as a dative)	-ta after a consonant; -kta after a vowel
comitative (also functions as an instrumental)	-wan
locative	-pi
ablative	-manta
allative	-man
terminative, 'until'	-kama
equative, 'like, as'	-hina
dative/final, 'for'	-paq
causal, 'because of'	-rayku
privative, 'without' (archaic, typical of Cuzco)	-naq

The morpheme ñiq expresses imprecise location: 'to, at, around, about'. On discourse particles, see the section Particles.

==== Noun formation ====
A notable suffix that forms nouns from other nouns is -(ni)yuq (the -ni- appears after a consonant), which means 'having X': e.g. llama-yuq 'llama owner'. A nominal suffix denoting groups is –(ni)ntin (meaning 'including', 'with ... and all'; cf. hina-ntin 'all' from hina 'so'.

==== Adjectives ====
Adjectives are indeclinable. In a noun phrase, they precede the noun. Comparison is expressed periphrastically. The comparative degree is expressed with the adverb aŝwan 'more' and the object of comparison in the ablative: ñuqa qam-manta aŝwan amawta-m ka-ni 'I am wiser than you'. The superlative uses the adverb ancha 'much' and the object of comparison is in the ablative or genitive: ñuqa llapa runa-kuna-manta / runa-kuna-p ancha amawta-m ka-ni 'I am the wisest of all the people'.

==== Pronouns ====
The personal pronouns are:

	singular	plural
1st person	ñuqa	exclusive: ñuqa-y-ku
1st person	ñuqa	inclusive: ñuqa-n-chik
2nd person	qam	qam-kuna
3rd person	pay	pay-kuna

As the table shows, the first person plural pronouns distinguish between an exclusive and an inclusive version with the same suffixes as the verbs. The other persons use the regular plural ending of nouns.

The demonstrative pronouns exhibit a three-way distinction: kay 'this (close to the speaker)', chay 'that (close to the addressee)' and chaqay 'that (far from both the speaker and the addressee)'. Demonstrative adverbs are hina 'so, like this'. and kanan/kunan 'now'.

For the possessive pronominal postposed markers, see the section on Nouns above.

The interrogative pronouns and adverbs are pi 'who', ima 'what', imana (optional contraction of ima-hina) 'how', mayqin 'which', hayka 'how much / how many', may 'where', maypacha or imaypacha 'when' (the latter more typical of Cuzco-influenced texts). When the enclitic -paŝ 'too' is added to an interrogative pronoun, the result is an indefinite pronoun: pi-paŝ 'somebody'. The enclitic may also be added to a noun modified by the pronoun: mayqin runa-paŝ 'some person'. The equivalents of negative pronouns are produced when the indefinite pronouns are preceded by the negative particle mana: mana ima-paŝ 'nothing'.

==== Numerals ====
The numeral system is decimal. The numerals from 1 to 10 are:

1	huk
2	iŝkay
3	kimsa
4	tawa
5	pichqa
6	suqta
7	qanĉis
8	pusaq
9	isqun
10	ĉunka

The teens are formed by combining the word ĉunka 'ten' and the numeral with the remaining units, suffixed with -(ni)yuq 'having': ĉunka huk-niyuq 'eleven', ĉunka kimsa-yuq 'thirteen', etc. The tens are formed by combining the number of units and the word 'ten': iŝkay chunka 'twenty', etc. Higher numbers are pachak 'hundred', waranqa 'thousand' and hunu 'million'.

After numerals, nouns normally do not stand in the plural. Ordinal numerals may be formed from the cardinal ones by adding the suffix –(ni)ntin (meaning 'including', 'with ... and all') or simply the 3rd person pronominal possessive suffix -(ni)n.

=== Verbal morphology ===
The verbal morpheme chain can be summarised as follows:

root	derivational suffixes (valency, voice, direction, aspect)	object (with some subjects)	tense/ mood/ finiteness	subject, 2nd person involvement	plurality (of subject or object)	optative	interrogative/ negation particle, discourse clitics

==== Valency/voice marking ====
grammatical meaning	suffix
inchoative and factitive	-ya-
causative	-chi-
reciprocal	-naku-
auxiliary	-wŝi-
applicative?	-pa(ya-)?

The suffix -ya- forms inchoatives from nouns: tuta-ya 'become night'. However, it may also have a factitive meaning: chiri-ya- lit. 'make cold > 'freeze' > 'petrify'.

A causative stem is produced by adding the suffix -chi- 'to make, let (somebody do something)': miku- 'eat' > miku-chi 'cause to eat, feed'.

Reciprocal meaning is expressed with the suffix -naku-: riku-naku 'to look at each other.

A desiderative suffix -naya- appended to the stem is recorded by Anonymous (1614: 24) as well as by Santo Tomás (1560: 39): upya-naya-ni 'I want to drink'.

A suffix -wŝi- expressing the meaning 'to help somebody do something' is recorded by Anonymous (1614: 25): e.g. taki-wŝi- 'help to dance', miku-wŝi- 'help to eat'.

The suffix -paya- may have expressed doing something for somebody: rima-paya- 'talk to somebody frequently'. In other cases it is explained as doing something excessively.

==== Aspectual suffixes ====
grammatical meaning	suffix
progressive	-chka-
prolonged action or the resulting state	-raya-
action performed in passing	-tamu-
intensity	-yku- (also -rqa-ya- and -rqa-ri-)
inception	-ri-
reiteration	-pa-

A few suffixes with more or less aspectual meaning are placed before the agreement morphemes. Progressive aspect is expressed by the suffix -chka-: upya-chka-n-ku 'they are drinking', upya-chka-rqa-n-ku 'they were drinking'. Thus, the suffix -raya expresses a prolonged action or the resulting state: urma-raya- – 'to have fallen' or 'to keep falling'. The suffix -yku- expresses intensity according to Taylor (1975: 117), but some colonial grammars regard it as a marker of movement inwards or downwards. A meaning of violent action is reported also for -rqa-ya- and -rqa-ri-, e.g. lliki-rqa- 'tear into many pieces' . The suffix -tamu- expresses an action performed in passing, occasionally. It is added to the root. The inceptive suffix -ri- expresses a beginning, as in rima-ri- 'begin to talk'. The suffix -pa- is mentioned as expressing doing something again by González-Holguín (1608: 114).

==== Direction suffixes ====
grammatical meaning	suffix
ventive/benefactive	-mu-
reflexive	-ku-
andative	-pu-
regressive	-mpu-
dispersive	-ykaĉa-
elative	-rqu-
illative	-yku-

The suffix -mu- may have ventive meaning: kaĉa-mu-n 'he sends it hither'. However, it may also express a benefactive relation to a participant other than the subject: yaya-n-ta aswa-kta qu-mu-n 'he gives chicha to his father'. On the other hand, if the dative object coincides with the subject, the reflexive suffix -ku- is used instead: aswa-kta apa-ku-n 'he takes the chica for himself'. The reflexive suffix is often used with verbs of emotion: kuŝi-ku- 'rejoice' (always in the reflexive), mancha-ku- 'be scared'. The suffix -pu- has andative meaning: kaĉa-pu-n 'he sends it away (from here)'. It, too, can have a benefactive meaning according to some colonial grammars. The suffix -ykaĉa denotes 'a dispersing action in all directions or with no logical continuity in time': apa-ykaĉa- 'carry around, everywhere'. The suffix -mpu is reported to express a return, as in kuti-mpu-. The suffix -rqu means 'out' (apa-rqu 'carry outside'), and -yku means 'in(wards)' (apa-yku 'carry inside').

==== Tense suffixes ====
tense	suffix
present	-∅-
past	-rqa-
future	fusional (-ŝaq-, -ŝqa-, -ŝun-, -nqa: see text)

The tense suffixes are placed between the object and the subject person agreement suffixes. The present tense is unmarked. Past tense is expressed by the suffix -rqa: e.g. riku-rqa-nku 'they saw it', riku-ŝu-rqa-nki 'he saw you'. The 3rd person singular ending -n can be absent after -rqa – this was more common in more Cuzco-influenced texts. The so-called future tense, which usually has the modal meaning of the speakers' desire or assessment of obligation, is expressed somewhat irregularly by a portmanteau suffix that simultaneously encodes person and even number. Its allomophy is presented in more detail in the section on Agreement inflection below. On the non-finite form markers, subordinators, which are placed in the same slot as the tense markers, see the section on Non-finite verb forms below.

==== Agreement suffixes ====
The verbs agree in person and number with the subject as well as the object, although not possible combinations of values for these grammatical categories are expressed unambiguously.

===== Object person marking =====
The person of an object is marked on the verb. That object may be direct or indirect, depending on the valency of the verb; thus, in the case of the verb 'to say', the addressee can be marked as an object. Cf. the similarly wide use of the accusative-dative suffix -kta. When the object is in the third person, this is not marked especially – the form coincides with the one used in the absence of an object and with intransitive verbs, or the third person object suffix could be said to be expressed by a zero morpheme -∅. However, for other persons as objects, there are two suffixes that are placed in a slot before the tense suffixes. Furthermore, since the use of these suffixes partly depends on the subject as well, it is necessary to take into account each possible combination of subject and a non-3rd person object. These combinations were known in early colonial grammars as 'transitions'.

The suffix -wa- indicates first person object, and -ŝu- indicates a second person object, but only if acted upon by a third person subject. A second person object acted upon by a first person subject has a fused expression -yki- (perhaps -y- for 1st person subject and -ki- for 2nd person object), but it is placed in the slot after the tense suffixes. It may also be observed that if the second person is involved, regardless of whether it is a subject or an object, the slot after the tense suffixes contains the suffix -nki (or, if the 1st person acting on 2nd person: -ki). Since object and subject agreement are partly intertwined in Quechua, a more complete picture of the verb paradigm emerges from the table in the summarising section on Agreement inflection.

In summary, the following object markers can be identified:

		pre-tense suffix slot	post-tense suffix slot
1st person		-wa-	------
2nd person	acted upon by 3rd person	-ŝu-	-nki
2nd person	acted upon by 1st person	------	-(y)ki?
3rd person		-∅-	------

===== Subject person marking =====
The subject suffixes are placed in the slot after the tense suffixes. They are sometimes influenced by the preceding tense suffixes and the following plural suffixes, leading to outright fusion in some cases, so a complete picture is impossible in isolation. Nonetheless, the following elements can be identified:

1st person	-ni (-y-?, -n-?)
2nd person	-nki
3rd person	-n

The slot that is generally reserved for subject suffixes contains the 2nd person suffix regardless of whether the 2nd person is a subject or object. As already mentioned, the marker y-ki signalling 1st person acting on 2nd person is placed here as well.

===== Marking of the plurality of participants =====
There are two plural agreement suffixes: -ku indicates that the participant triggering agreement is a plural group that excludes the addressee, and -chik indicates that it is a plural group that includes the addressee. Nonetheless, their use is unnecessary if the plurality of the subject is already indicated in the nominal phrase. Generally, these suffixes are simply added to the corresponding forms for singular subjects, except that the 1st person singular, which is normally expressed by -ni, is marked by -y- before -ku and by -n- before -chik, and the future tense suffix becomes -ŝun- before them in forms other than the 1st person exclusive subject. The resulting paradigm is shown in the tables in the Agreement inflection section below.

The plural suffixes (as well as the future tense plural allomorph -ŝun-) may express the plurality of either the subject or the object. Which of the two controls the number agreement depends on the exact configuration of persons. As a rule of thumb, number agreement is with the subject:

1. if there is no object;
2. if the object is in the 3rd person;
3. if the subject is in the 2nd person;
4. according to some authorities, optionally, if a 3rd person plural is acting on a 1st person singular, leading to forms like -wa-...n-ku (in the present and past) and -wa-∅-nqa-ku.

In other cases, number agreement is with the object – i.e., in most cases where the object is not in the 3rd person.

Since the agreement morphology generally does not express the number of the subject and the object at the same time, there is often some ambiguity between numbers: for example, in -wa-...-ŝun-chik, the 3rd person subject acting upon the first person inclusive ('us') may be either 's/he' or 'they'.

===== Agreement inflection =====
The present tense suffixes designating the person of the subject are as follows (the arrow expresses the relationship between a subject and an object). Note that while the object suffixes are shown here for clarity, the tense suffixes (including the present tense zero suffix -∅-) are placed between them and the others.

	singular	plural	number agreement is with:
1st person	-ni	exclusive: -y-ku	subject
1st person	-ni	inclusive: -n-chik	subject
1st person → 2nd person	-yki	-yki-chik	object
2nd person	-nki	-nki-chik	subject
2nd person → 1st person	-wa-...-nki	-wa-...-nki-chik	subject
3rd person	-n	-n-ku	subject
3rd person → 2nd person	-ŝu-...-nki	-ŝu-...-nki-chik	object
3rd person → 1st person	-wa-...-n	exclusive: -wa-...-y-ku (and -wa-...-n-ku?)	object
3rd person → 1st person	-wa-...-n	inclusive: -wa-...-n-chik	object
3rd person → 1st person	-wa-...-n	-wa-...-n-ku?	subject?

Examples: kuya-yki 'I/we love you (singular)', kuya-wa-y-ku or kuya-wa-n-ku, 'he loves us' (this corresponds to the difference between Potosí and Cuzco Quechua).

In the future tense, the patterns signalling agreement are different and the tense and person agreement suffixes sometimes appear to be fused into one morpheme:

	singular	plural	number agreement is with:
1st person	-ŝaq	exclusive: -ŝaq-ku	subject
1st person	-ŝaq	inclusive: -ŝun(-chik)	subject
1st person → 2nd person	-ŝqa-yki	-ŝqa-yki-chik	object
2nd person	-nki (= present)	-nki-chik (= present)	subject
2nd person → 1st person	-wa-...-nki (= present)	-wa-...-nki-chik (= present)	subject
3rd person	-nqa	-nqa-ku	subject
3rd person → 2nd person	-ŝu-...-nki (= present)	-ŝu-...-nki-chik (= present)	object
3rd person → 1st person	-wa-...-nqa	exclusive: -wa-...-ŝun-ku	object
3rd person → 1st person	-wa-...-nqa	inclusive: -wa-...-ŝun(-chik)	object
3rd person → 1st person	-wa-...-nqa	-wa-...-nqa-ku?	subject?

Example: riku-ŝqa-y-ki-chik 'I/we shall see you (all)'

As we can see, the form of future tense marker varies widely. It has the form -ŝaq in the first person singular (with no separate person agreement suffix after it) and in the first plural exclusive (if agreeing with the subject). Another allomorph, -ŝqa-, occurs before the ending -yki for 1st person acting on 2nd person. A third allomorph, -ŝun, is used in the first person plural inclusive (where it is optionally followed by -chik), as well in the exclusive, but the latter only if it represents agreement in the object. In the third person, the suffix is suppletive: -nqa. Finally, in the second person and in cases where the third person is acting on second person, there is tense syncretism: the present tense forms are used instead of the future ones.

=== Imperative ===
The imperative forms, as shown in the table below, have unique person-mood portmanteau suffixes for the second and third person, namely -y and -chun, respectively, but the options for the preceding and following suffixes are mostly the same as in the indicative, except that the paradigm is somewhat defective.

The second person imperative suffix is -y: e.g. hamu-y 'come!'. It is preceded by the object markers: waqaycha-wa-y! 'protect me!' As usual, a third person object receives no overt suffix: waqaycha-y! 'protect him/her/it!'. The plural suffixes are added to the imperative one to mark the plurality of the subject or the object as well: waqaycha-y-chik! 'protect it (addressed to several people)!' In contrast to the general limitation to one plural suffix per verb, the optional possibility of expressing the plurality of the object in addition to the subject as in waqaycha-wa-y-chik-ku! 'protect us ye!' (alongside the ambiguous waqaycha-wa-y-chik!) has been recorded. An alternative recorded with the same meaning is waqaycha-wa-y-ku!, which seems to reflect the plurality of the 1st person object only.

There is also a third person imperative suffix -chun: hamu-chun 'let him come!' Plurality of the subject can be expressed with -ku here, too: hamu-chun-ku 'let them come!'. It can take the 1st person object prefix (riku-wa-chun 'let him/them see me!'), but to express a 1st plural object, the future forms are used instead. Imperative forms for a 3rd person acting on the 2nd are not recorded by the cited grammars.

For a first person plural imperative (exclusive or inclusive), the corresponding future tense forms are used.

The resulting paradigm can be summarised as follows:

	singular	plural	number agreement is with:
1st person	--------	exclusive: -ŝaq-ku (= future)	subject
1st person	--------	inclusive: -ŝun(-chik) (= future)	subject
1st person → 2nd person	--------	--------	---------
2nd person	-y	-y-chik	subject
2nd person → 1st person	-wa-...-y	-wa-...-y-chik	subject
2nd person → 1st person	-wa-...-y	-wa-...-y-ku	object
2nd person → 1st person	-wa-...-y	-wa-...-y-chik-ku?	subject and object?
3rd person	-chun	-chun-ku	subject
3rd person → 2nd person	---------	----------	---------
3rd person → 1st person	wa-...-chun	exclusive: -wa-...-ŝun-ku (= future)	object
3rd person → 1st person	wa-...-chun	inclusive: -wa-...-ŝun(-chik) (= future)	object

=== Optative ===
The optative mood expresses a wish, a (dubious or improbable) possibility, a hypothetical condition or its result. It is generally formed by adding the suffix -man to the present tense forms (before possible discourse particles): e.g. hamu-nki-man 'you would come'. However, the 1st person singular suffix -ni is replaced by -y, and the 1st person plural inclusive -n-chik fuses with -man into -chwan. The overall paradigm is, then:

	singular	plural	number agreement is with:
1st person	-y-man	exclusive: -y-ku-man	subject
1st person	-y-man	inclusive: -chwan, -n-chik-man	subject
1st person → 2nd person	-yki-man	-yki-chik-man	object
2nd person	-nki-man	-nki-chik-man	subject
2nd person → 1st person	-wa-∅-nki-man	-wa-∅-nki-chik-man	subject
3rd person	-n-man	-n-ku-man	subject
3rd person → 2nd person	-ŝu-∅-nki-man	-ŝu-∅-nki-chik-man	object
3rd person → 1st person	-wa-∅-n-man	exclusive: -wa-∅-y-ku-man	object
3rd person → 1st person	-wa-∅-n-man	inclusive: -wa-∅-chwan, -wa-∅-n-chik-man	object
3rd person → 1st person	-wa-∅-n-man	-wa-∅-n-ku-man?	subject?

As in the indicative, the plural suffixes can also express plurality of the object, and this includes the fused -chwan: thus, third person acting on first person inclusive ('he would V us') is expressed by the suffix sequence -wa-chwan.

The hypothetical result of a non-realisable condition in the past (a 'preterite optative') can be expressed by adding the 3rd person singular past tense of the copula: hamu-nki-man ka-rqa-n 'you would have come'.

=== Copula and possession ===
The copula verb is ka-, but it is omitted in the third person. This applies also in periphrastic 'compound tenses' formed with the copula. However, it also has the sense 'exist', in which case its third person form is used. It is also included in the way of expressing the notion 'to have': (ñuqa-p) wasi-y ka-n '(of me) my house exists > I have a house.'

=== Non-finite verbal forms ===
The suffixes of the non-finite verbal forms are as follows:

grammatical form	suffix
infinitive	-y
potential/future infinitive 1	-nqa
potential/future infinitive 2	-na
present participle	-q
past participle	-ŝqa
gerund (same subject)	-ŝpa
gerund (different subject)	-pti

==== Infinitive ====
The infinitive (verb noun) is formed with the suffix -y: riku-y 'seeing, sight, vision'. With negation and the suffix -paq 'for' it expresses impossibility: mana riku-y-paq 'not for see-ing' > 'invisible'.

==== Potential/future infinitive ====
Further, there are two 'potential/future infinitives', which may be formed with two suffixes, the more archaic -nqa, which is probably related to the 3rd person singular future suffix, and the more innovative -na. The first one predominates in the texts of the Third Council of Lima and in Bocanegra's Cuzco-influenced work, whereas the manuscript of Huarochirí has many instances of both, and texts from the second decade of the 16th century lack -nqa entirely. They denote a potential or expected action in the future. Their agent is expressed by possessive suffixes: riku-nqa-yki-paq 'lit. for your potential seeing' > 'so that you see'. The use of -nqa is mostly limited in the Huarochirí manuscript to constructions where it is followed by the suffixes -paq 'for', which usually expresses purpose, and -kama 'until', the latter sometimes also with the meaning 'while'.

The use of -na is wider: it can also be found in the accusative, e.g. riku-na-yki-kta muna-ni 'I want you to see', lit. 'I want your potential seeing'. It can also be used to designate different participants in the action: instruments (alla-ku-na 'means for digging'), places (yayku-na, 'place for entering, i.e. entrance'), objects (sita-na 'object for throwing'). It can also be used as an attribute or apposition to a noun: yayku-na punku 'door for entering'.

==== Present participle ====
A present participle or agent noun is formed with the suffix -q: riku-q 'seeing, one who sees'. It may function like a noun or like an adjective. Again, it is compatible with an object marker: riku-wa-q 'who sees me', but the object can also be expressed by a possessive pronominal suffix: riku-q-ni-y. A more archaic allomorphic rule found in some texts replaces q with qi in front of possessive suffixes: riku-qi-y, riku-qi-n-chik, etc. This allomorph is found in more Cuzco-influenced texts as well as in those of the Third Council of Lima, but not in the Huarochirí Manuscript. The present participle may be combined with the copula to form a compound tense with a meaning of habituality. In this use, the verbal plural suffix -ku may be added directly to the present participle: -q-ku.

==== Past participle ====
A past participle is formed with the suffix -ŝqa: riku-ŝqa 'seen'. As the example shows, its meaning is passive in transitive verbs, much as in English and Spanish. The past participle may have attributive function or occur alone. A possessive pronominal suffix can be used to express the agent: riku-ŝqa-nchik 'what we have seen'. The past participle may be combined with the copula (which is absent in the third person) to form a compound perfect tense expressing resultative state, sometimes with a nuance of surprising discovery. In that case, the participle takes the object suffixes, but the copula takes the plurality suffixes: ñi-wa-ŝqa ka-n-chik 'he said it to us'. In view of the passive meaning, the combination of past participle and copula is also the periphrasis that colonial grammars propose as a translation of the Latin passive. However, the past participle may also be used, similarly to the infinitive, as a noun denoting the action itself (urma-mu-ŝqa-n-mi ... riku-ri-n 'its falling [i.e., the place it fell] ... is visible' ), and correspond to a clause in a construction akin to accusativus cum infinitivo, although it is only the participle that stands in the accusative: Macacalla yaĉa-n-chik ... urqu-pi ka-ŝqa-n-ta 'we know that Macacalla ... is on a hill', lit. 'Macacalla we know ... its being on a hill'.

==== Gerunds ====
There are two gerunds, marked for switch-reference. A gerund expressing a concomitant action of the subject of the finite verb is formed with the ending -ŝpa: e.g. riku-ŝpa '(while) seeing', ñi-ŝpa '(while) saying', the latter form often following quoted speech.

This contrasts with the gerund ending in -pti, which is used when the logical subject of the verb does not coincide with that of the finite verb in the clause. It is followed by the pronominal possessive suffixes to express the logical subject: e.g. upya-pti-n 'while he is/was drinking', upya-pti-nchik 'while we (inclusive) are/were drinking'. The gerund also allows an object suffix like the finite verbs (attested in the 1st person: N V-wa-pti-n 'while N was V-ing me'). Combined with expressions of the meaning 'already' (ña) and 'not yet' (mana-raq), the gerunds may acquire the meanings 'after doing' and 'before doing' (lit. 'not yet having done') something.

==== Compound tenses ====
As already mentioned, there are at least two periphrastic constructions that may be described as compound tenses, which are formed by combining participles with the copula: a perfect using the past participle and a habitual using the present participle. In that case, a split in affixes may be observed where the object suffix is attached to the non-finite main verb, but the suffix – to the finite auxiliary: riku-wa-ŝqa ka-n-chik 'he saw us (inclusive)', ñi-ŝu-q ka-n-ki 'he told you (sing.). See the sections on the relevant participles for more information.

=== Particles ===
Some of the most important particles are the following:

particle	meaning
-qa	focused topic
-taq	focused topic, expressing stronger contrast
-ri	new topic
-m(i)	affirmative evidentiality
-ŝ(i)	hearsay evidentiality
-ĉ(á)	dubitative evidentiality
-chu	interrogative and negative
-paŝ	also, and
-lla	only, just
-raq	still, yet
(-)ña	already
-puni	definitely
-ari	truly, certainly

Focused topics are marked with the enclitic particle -qa or with -taq, which expresses a stronger contrast, similar to English 'but, whereas, although'. Another topic-introducing particle is -ri, which signals a new topic in contrast with the previous one and can be translated as 'and', 'but', 'as for', or 'what about' (the latter in questions). The topic particle is mutually exclusive with the enclitic particles encoding evidentiality, one of which is typically added to the first available unit of each clause. There are three of these: -m(i) for personally witnessed facts, -ŝ(i) for hearsay and -ĉá for conjecture/doubt. Thus, allin-mi can be translated as 'I know for certain that it is good', allin-ŝi as 'They say it's good', and allin-ĉá as 'it might be good'. The non-syllabic allomorphs -m, -ĉ and -ŝ are used after vowels, and the syllabic ones -mi, -ĉ(á) and -ŝ(i) are used after consonants: e.g. wasi-m 'house-affirmative', but yawar-mi 'blood-affirmative'.

An example of the combined use of the topic and focus-evidential particles can be the sentence: chay wasi-qa hatun-mi 'that house (near you) is big'. The topic can also be postposed, with the particles still signalling the information structure: chay wasi-m hatun-qa 'it is that house (near you) that is big'. In a negated verb phrase, the evidential particle is encliticised to the negative adverb: warmi-qa mana-m hamu-n-chu 'the woman isn't coming' (on the particle -chu, see below).

The interrogative particle, which marks yes/no-questions, is -chu. It is encliticised to the focused word: hatun-chu chay wasi-qa 'is this house big?'. The same particle is also encliticised to the last word of a negated verb phrase, in addition to the preceding negative adverb mana, whereas the latter receives the evidential particles: thus, warmi-qa mana-m hamu-n-chu 'the woman isn't coming'. In a prohibitative construction, the same particle is used, whereas the preceding adverb is ama: ama hamu-y-chu! 'don't come!' The adverb ama is used in the future tense, too: ama-taq kuti-ŝaq-chu 'but I will not return' Another common negative adverb is paqta(ĉ) 'be careful (so that X does not happen)', which is combined with the optative mood.

The function conjunction is fulfilled by enclitic particles such as -paŝ 'and': wasi-paŝ 'and a house', as well as some of the discourse particles already mentioned. There is also an enclitic particle -lla meaning 'only': huk llamalla 'only a llama'., an enclitic particle -raq meaning 'still, yet', and a morpheme ña 'already' that may occur as an enclitic particle or as an independent word.

A free-standing particle ari is used to confirm emphatically the preceding information: mana-m ari 'truly, certainly not'. A similar meaning is attested for the enclitic -puni 'definitely'.

=== Syntax ===
The word order is mostly SOV. In noun phrases, modifiers (such as adjectives) precede nouns: e.g. allin wamra 'a/the good child'. A past participle may also follow the noun, in which case both receive the relevant case suffix: kuya-ŝqa wasi-kta 'beloved house (acc.)', but wasi-kta kuya-ŝqa-kta (ditto).

== Sample text ==
The following text is from the beginning of the Huarochirí Manuscript.

The first line is the original colonial spelling, and the second the normalised transliteration.

Runa yndio ñiscap machonkuna ñaupa pacha quillcacta yachanman carca chayca ...
Runa Indio ñiŝqap machunkuna ñawpa pacha qillqakta yaĉanman karqan chayqa ...
If the ancestors of the people called Indians had known writing in ancient times, then...

... hinantin causascancunapas manam canancamapas chincaycuc hinacho canman.
... hinantin kawsaŝqankunapaŝ manam kanankamapaŝ chinkaykuq hinachu kanman.
... all the things they have lived certainly would not have kept disappearing like this until now, either.

Himanam viracochappas sinchi cascanpas canancama ricurin, hinatacmi canman.
Imanam wiraquchappaŝ sinchi kaŝqanpaŝ kanankama rikurin, hinataqmi kanman.
In the way the valorous acts of the Spaniards (Huiracochas) are still seen, too, so it would have been (with theirs as well).

Chayhina captinpas, canancama mana quillcasca captinpas,
Chayhina kaptinpaŝ, kanankama mana qillqaŝqa kaptinpaŝ,
And, things being as they are, and since nothing has been written until now,

caypim churani cay huc yayayuc Guarocheri ñiscap machoncunap causascanta,
kaypim ĉurani kay huk yayayuq Waruchiri ñiŝqap machunkunap kawsaŝqanta,
here I present the lived (experiences) of the ancestors of this (people) called Huarochirí, which has one father,

yma feenioccha carcan, ymayñah canancamapas causan chay chaycunacta.
ima feeniyuqĉá karqan, imahinaĉ kanankamapaŝ kawsan chay chaykunakta.
whatever faith it may have had and however it may be living to this day – these things.

Chayri sapa llactanpim quillcasca canca himahina causascampas pacariscanmanta.
Chayri sapa llaqtanpim qillqaŝqa kanqa imahina kawsaŝqanpaŝ paqariŝqamanta.
Afterwards, in each region it shall be written down how it has lived since its beginning.

Ancha ñaupa pachaca huc huaca ñiskas yanañamca Tutañamca sutioc carcan.
Ancha ñawpa pachaqa huk waka ñiskaŝ {Yana Ñamqa} {Tuta Ñamqa} ŝutiyuq karqan.
They say that in a very ancient time there were (two) gods (''huacas'') named Yana Ñamca and Tuta Ñamca.

Cay huacacunactaca quipanpi huc huacatac Huallallo Caruincho sutioc atircan.
Kay wakakunaktaqa qipanpi huk wakataq Wallallu Qarwinchu ŝutiyuq atirqan.
These two gods, however, were later overcome by a god named Huallallo Caruincho.

Ña atispas canan runacta yscayllata huachacunampac camarcan.
Ña atiŝpaŝ kanan runakta iŝkayllata waĉakunanpaq kamarqan.
Now, having defeated them, he obliged the people to give birth to only two (children).

Huctas quiquin micorcan.
Huktaŝ kikin mikurqan.
One of them he ate himself.

Huctas mayquintapas cuyascanta causachicorcan yayan maman.
Huktaŝ mayqintapaŝ kuyaŝqanta kawsachikurqan yayan maman.
And one – whomever his father and mother loved (the most) – they let live.

== Bibliography ==
- Adelaar, Willem F. H. (1994). La procedencia dialectal del manuscrito de Huarochirí sobre la base de sus características lingüísticas. Revista Andina No.1 Julio '94
- Adelaar, Willem. 2007. The Languages of the Andes. With the collaboration of P.C. Muysken. Cambridge language survey. Cambridge University Press, 2007
- Adelaar, W. F.H. 2012. Languages of the Middle Andes in areal-typological perspective: Emphasis on Quechuan and Aymaran. In: L. R. Campbell & V. M. Grondona, eds. The Indigenous Languages of South America: A Comprehensive Guide.
- Anonymous. 1614. Arte y vocabulario de la lengua general del Perú, llamada quichua, y en la lengua española, el mas copiosa y eleganta, que basta ahora se ha impesso. Los Reyes.
- González Holguín, Diego. 1608. Gramatica y arte nueua de la lengua general de todo el Peru, llamada lengua Quichua, o lengua del Inca. Los Reyes.
- Santo Tomás, Domingo de (1560). Grammatica o Arte de la lengua general de los Indios de los Reynos del Perú (Valladolid, 1560).on Google Books
- Durston, Allan. 2007. Pastoral Quechua: The History of Christian Translation in Colonial Peru. Notre Dame: University of Notre Dame Press.
- Itier, César. 2000. Lengua general y quechua cuzqueño en los siglos XVI y XVII
- Itier, César. 1991. La lengua general y comunicación escrita: Cinco cartas en quechua de Cotahuasi-1616. Revista Andina No.1 Julio '91
- Kelly, Niamh. 2011. Verbal Affix Order in Quechua. Memorias del V Congreso de Idiomas. Indígenas de Latinoamérica, 6–8 de octubre de 2011
- Lakämper, Renate, Dieter Wunderlich. 1998. Person marking in Quechua: a constraint-based minimalist analysis. Lingua 105: pp. 113–48.
- Mannheim, Bruce. 1991a. Southern Peruvian Quechua Consonant Lenition. In: Mary Ritchie Key (ed.), Language change in South American Indian languages. University of Pennsylvania Press.
- Mannheim, Bruce. 1991b. The Language of the Inka since the European invasion. University of Texas Press
- Rivero, Álvaro Ezcurra, Raúl Bendezú-Araujo. 2017. Gramáticas y vocabularios coloniales del quechua y del aimara (1560–1619). In: Literaturas orales y primeros textos coloniales.
- Cerrón Palomino, R. (2010) El contacto inicial quechua-castellano: la conquista del Perú con dos palabras. Lexis Vol. XXXIV (2) 2010: 369–381.l.
- Rowe, J. H. 1950. "Sound Patterns in Three Inca Dialects." International Journal of American Linguistics 16: 137–148.
- Saenz, S. Dedenbach-Salazar. 1990. Quechua Sprachmaterialen. In: Meyers, A., M. Volland. Beiträge zur Kulturgeschichte des westlichen Südamerika. Forschungsberichte des Landes Nordrhein-Westfalen
- Salomon, Frank and George L. Urioste. 1991. The Huarochirí manuscript : a testament of ancient and colonial Andean religion. Austin: University of Texas Press, 1991.
- Suarez, J. A. 1977. Classical languages. In: Sebeok, Thomas (ed.) Native Languages of the Americas, vol. 2. Springer Science.
- Taylor, G. P. 1976. Introducción a la lengua general (quechua). Institut Francais d'Etudes Andines. Lluvia Editores.
- Taylor, G. P. 1987. Ritos y tradiciones de Huarochirí. Manuscrito quechua de comienzos del siglo XVII. Versión paleográfica, interpretación fonológica y traducción al castellano. IEP, IFEA.
- Taylor, G. P. 2001. Waruchiri ñiŝqap ñawpa machunkunap kawsaŝqan. IFEA
- Taylor, Gerald (2009). Choque Amaru y otros cuentos. Lectura bilingüe Quechua Colonial – Castellano. ISBN 978-9972-9470-6-3
- Torero, Alfredo (1994). Las sibilantes del quechua yunga y del castellano en el siglo XVI sobre los sonidos del quechua costeño como descrito por Domingo de Santo Tomás.
- Torres Rubio, Diego de. 1619. Arte de la lengua Quichua. Pro Francisco Lasso. Lima.
- Weber, David. (1996). Una gramática del quechua del Huallaga. Serie Lingüística Peruana N° 40. Lima: Instituto Lingüístico de Verano.
- Wunderlich, Dieter (2005). Variation der Person-Numerus-Flexion in Quechua. Flexionsworkshop Leipzig, 14. Juli 2005
