= Roman Catholic Diocese of Temuco =

Roman Catholic diocese in Chile

Diocese of Temuco Dioecesis Temucensis Diócesis de Temuco

Catholic
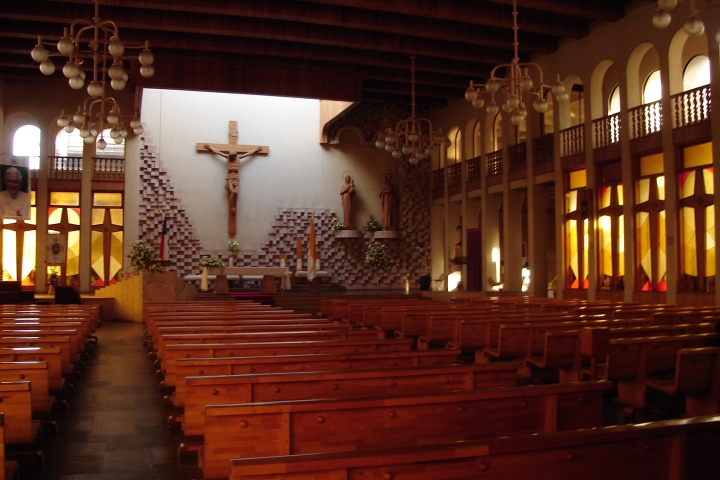
- Cathedral of St. Joseph

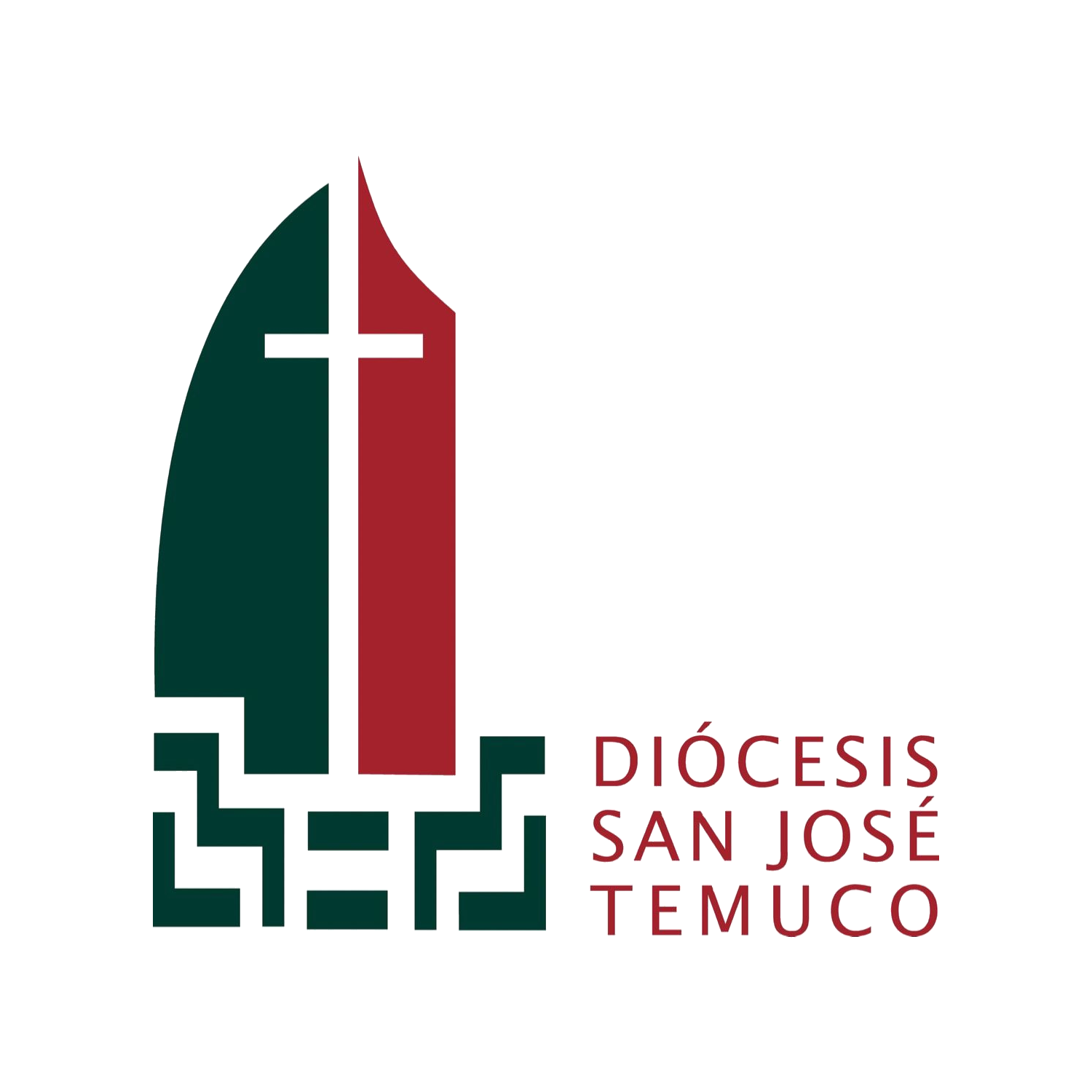
- Coat of arms

Location
- Country: Chile
- Ecclesiastical province: Concepción
- Metropolitan: Concepción

Statistics
- Area: 17,474 km^{2} (6,747 sq mi)
- Population: Total; Catholics: (as of 2023); 723,000; 463,000 (64.0%)
- Parishes: 37

Information
- Denomination: Catholic Church
- Sui iuris church: Latin Church
- Rite: Roman Rite
- Established: 1908; 118 years ago
- Cathedral: Cathedral of St Joseph in Temuco
- Patron saint: Saint Joseph
- Secular priests: 52 (36 Diocesan, 16 Religious Orders)
- Language: Spanish

Current leadership
- Pope: Leo XIV
- Bishop: Jorge Concha Cayuqueo, O.F.M.
- Metropolitan Archbishop: Sergio Hernán Pérez de Arce Arraigada, SS.CC.
- Bishops emeritus: Manuel Camilo Vial Risopatrón, I.Sch.

Website
- obispadodetemuco.cl

The Roman Catholic Diocese of Temuco (Latin: Temucen(sis)) is the ecclesiastical circumscription of the Catholic Church that, with its seat in Temuco, shares the ecclesiastical government of the territory of Araucanía Region (Chile) together with the Diocese of Villarrica, covering the entire Province of Malleco and part of the Province of Cautín. In its totality it includes the communes of Perquenco, Galvarino, Cholchol and Temuco, and most of the communes of Lautaro, Nueva Imperial and Carahue. It is a suffragan of the Roman Catholic Archdiocese of Concepción. The Diocese of Temuco is the current administrator of the Temuco Catholic University.

== History ==
- 1908: Established as Mission “sui iuris” of Temuco from the Diocese of Concepción
- 18 October 1925: Promoted as Diocese of Temuco

== Bishops ==
- Bishops of Temuco (Roman rite), in reverse chronological order
  - Jorge Concha Cayuqueo, O.F.M. (2023.03.04 – Present)
  - Hector Eduardo Vargas Bastidas, S.D.B. (2013.05.14 – 2022.03.07)
  - Manuel Camilo Vial Risopatrón, I.Sch. (2001.09.21 – 2013.05.14), retired
  - Sergio Otoniel Contreras Navia (1977.12.23 – 2001.09.21), retired
  - Bernardino Piñera Carvallo (1960.12.10 – 1977.12.28), resigned
  - Alejandro Menchaca Lira (1941.08.09 – 1960.09.13), resigned
  - Augusto Osvaldo Salinas Fuenzalida, SS.CC. (1939.08.29 – 1941.02.09), appointed Auxiliary Bishop of Santiago de Chile
  - Alfredo Silva Santiago (1935.02.23 – 1939.02.04), appointed Bishop of Concepción
  - Prudencio Contardo Ibarra, C.Ss.R. (1920.06.15 – 1934.12.15), resigned
  - Ricardo Sepúlveda Hermosilla (1908 – 1919), resigned

=== Auxiliary bishop ===
- Jorge Maria Hourton Poisson (1992-2001)

=== Other priest of this diocese who became bishop ===
- Ricardo Sepúlveda Hermosilla (priest of diocese of Concepción who was then Vicar General here, 1908-1919; titular bishop in 1911)

== Sources ==
- Giga-Catholic Information
- Catholic Hierarchy
- Diocese website
