= Coastal Quechua =

Hypothesized variety of Classical Quechua

- Maritime Quechua, Chincha Quechua
- (disputed)
- Native to: Peru
- Region: Department of Lima, Department of Ica
- Ethnicity: Quechua people
- Extinct: (date missing)
- Language family: Quechuan: Classical Quechua; Coastal Quechua

Language codes
- ISO 639-3: None (mis)
- Glottolog: None

Coastal Quechua, also called Maritime Quechua or Chincha Quechua, is a hypothesized variety of Classical Quechua spoken in coastal region of the modern Peruvian departments of Lima and Ica. It would have been widespread in coastal valleys located between the Rímac and Ica rivers, bordering the Quingnam language in the north and an Aymaran language in the south, with which it shared a transition zone in the valleys of Pisco and Ica. Like other non-southern varieties of Quechua, it would have been considered a quechua chinchaisuyo during the colonial period. It went extinct due to the depopulation of the southern Peruvian coast, part of the Andean demographic collapse. Today, there is no surviving variety that can be considered a descendant of Coastal Quechua.

== Existence ==
Its existence is debated among specialists. There are indications in certain chronicles suggesting that the Chincha culture spoke a Quechua language. In the late 20th century, Peruvian linguist Alfredo Torero proposed that Quechua, and specifically a variety particular to the Chincha was spread and used as a lingua franca as a result of their commercial activity, as well as the religious importance of the oracle of Pachacámac. According to Torero, it is possible that this variety was the ancestor of the modern Kichwa language spoken in Ecuador. However, this hypothesis has been heavily criticized by later investigators.

There is also a lack of a consensus on which colonial documents would reflect this so-called Coastal Quechua. In a famous article published in 1990, Rodolfo Cerrón-Palomino proposed a series of phonological and grammatical characteristics of Coastal Quechua from the first Quechua dictionary and grammar, written by the missionary Domingo de Santo Tomás and published in Valladolid in 1560. However, Santo Tomás does not mention in either work the source of his linguistic data, and the attribution of both to coastal Quechua is based on information about his pastoral work in the 1540s. The features attributed by Cerrón-Palomino to Coastal Quechua include: (i) the absence of aspirated and ejective plosives, (ii) the sonorization of occlusives following nasal sounds, and (iii) the fricativization of occlusives in coda position (which also occurred in the dialect of Cuzco), among others. Studies published in the 21st century have seriously questioned the placement of the Quechua described by Santo Tomás in the Chincha region, while Cerrón-Palomino has affirmed the existence of this coastal variety.

The interpretation of the dominant linguistic variety in Santo Tomás's work as "coastal Quechua" became part of a consensus view of Quechua (pre)history, which remained in force for almost five decades. This interpretation was ultimately refuted in a work by Itier (2013), in which he points out the weakness of the documentary base for the so-called "coastal Quechua." Added to this criticism is the problematization of maritime contacts between central Peru and Ecuador, especially in relation to the return journey from north to south, contrary to the direction of the ocean current (Hocquenghem, 2012), and the lack of a solid toponymic presence of Quechua in the central Peruvian coast (Arjan Mossel, personal communication). These new approaches call into question the geographical origin of both the variety of Quechua that dominates Santo Tomás's work and Ecuadorian Quechua (or Quichua).

— Willem F. H. Adelaar (2022, p. 107)

== See also ==
- Quechuan languages
- Classical Quechua
- Chincha culture
- Ichma culture
- Kichwa language
- Yauyos–Chincha Quechua
