= La Imperial, Chile =

City founded in 1552, abandoned 1600

Coordinates: 37°15′S 73°19′W

Coat of arms of La Imperial, granted by Philip of Spain in 1554. Today, is used as coat of Carahue and Nueva Imperial.

La Imperial or Ciudad Imperial was a city founded by Pedro de Valdivia on 16 April 1552 and named in honor of the Holy Roman Emperor Charles V, then (also) king of Spain. It was abandoned on 5 April 1600 and destroyed as a result of the Mapuche Uprising of 1598 during the War of Arauco. The ruins ('old city') were called Antigua Imperial. A city was refounded there in 1882 under the name Carahue.

== Ecclesiastical history ==
- Established on 1563.05.22 as Diocese of La Imperial (Spanish) / Civitatis Imperialis (Latin, actually corresponding to 'Ciudad Imperial') on territory split off (with border at the river Maule) from the only two year older Diocese of Santiago de Chile (now Metropolitan, in the Chilean national capital) as Suffragan of the (Peruvian) Archdiocese of Lima
- Suppressed in 1603, as the city was destroyed in 1600, its territory being reassigned to establish (at present Penco) the then Roman Catholic Archdiocese of Concepción (now Metropolitan).

Suffragan bishops of La Imperial

- Antonio de San Miguel Avendaño y Paz, Friars Minor (O.F.M.) (1563.03.22 – 1588.03.09), next Bishop of Quito (Ecuador) (1588.03.09 – death 1590.11.07)
- Agustín de Cisneros Montesa (1589.03.09 – death 1596)
- Reginaldo de Lizárraga, Dominican Order (O.P.) (Spaniard) (1598.08.31 – 1603), next first Bishop of successor see Concepción (Chile) (1603 – 1609.07.20), Bishop of Paraguay (Paraguay) (1609.07.20 – 1609.11.10).

=== Titular see ===
The diocese was nominally restored in 2000 as Latin Titular bishopric of La Imperial (Spanish) / Civitatis Imperialis (Latin)

It has had the following incumbents, so far of the fitting Episcopal (lowest) rank :

- Ricardo Ezzati Andrello, Salesians (S.D.B.) (Italian) (10 July 2001 - 27 Dec 2006) as Auxiliary Bishop of Archdiocese of Santiago de Chile (Chile) (2001.07.10 – 2006.12.27); previously Bishop of Roman Catholic Diocese of Valdivia (Chile) (1996.06.28 – 2001.07.10); later Metropolitan Archbishop of Concepción (Chile) (2006.12.27 – 2010.12.15), President of Episcopal Conference of Chile (2010.11 – 2016.11.11), Metropolitan Archbishop of above Santiago (de Chile) (2010.12.15 – ...), created Cardinal-Priest of SS. Redentore a Valmelaina (2014.02.22 [2014.10.11] – ...)
- Pedro Ossandón Buljevic (4 Nov 2008 - ...) first as Auxiliary Bishop of Archdiocese of Concepción (Chile) (2008.11.04 – 2012.07.10), then as Auxiliary Bishop of Archdiocese of Santiago de Chile (Chile) (2012.07.10 – ...).

== Sources and external links ==
- GCatholic
- Francisco Solano Asta-Buruaga y Cienfuegos, Diccionario geográfico de la República de Chile, D. Appleton y Compania, Nueva York, 1899
- Imperial (Ciudad), pg. 329-330
- Crescente Errázuriz, Seis años de la historia de Chile: 23 de diciembre de 1598- 9 de abril de 1605: memoria histórica, Impr. Nacional, Sanitiago de Chile, 1881.
