= Diocese of Temuco =

Diocese of Temuco may refer to the following ecclesiastical jurisdictions in Chile:

- Roman Catholic Diocese of Temuco
- Anglican Diocese of Temuco
