= Sixtus Josef Parzinger =

Austrian-born Chilean Roman Catholic bishop (1931–2023)

The Most Reverend Sixtus Josef Parzinger
- Bishop Emeritus of Villarica
- Metropolis: Concepción
- Appointed: 19 November 2001
- Term ended: 7 February 2009
- Predecessor: Post created
- Successor: Francisco Javier Stegmeier Schmidlin
- Previous posts: Apostolic Vicar of Araucanía and Titular Bishop of Gaguari (1977–2001)

Orders
- Ordination: 29 June 1960 by Joseph Wendel
- Consecration: 5 March 1978 by Agnelo Rossi

Personal details
- Born: 21 December 1931 St. Johann in Tirol, Austria
- Died: 25 February 2023 (aged 91)
- Motto: AD AEDIFICATIONEM FIDEI
- Coat of arms

Styles of Sixtus Josef Parzinger
- Reference style: His Excellency; The Most Reverend
- Spoken style: Your Excellency
- Religious style: Bishop

Sixtus Josef Parzinger (21 December 1931 – 25 February 2023) was an Austrian-born Chilean Roman Catholic prelate. He was bishop of Villarrica from 2001 to 2009.

Catholic Church titles
Preceded by Post created	Bishop of Villarica; 2001–2009	Succeeded by Francisco Javier Stegmeier Schmidlin
Preceded by Carlos Guillermo Hartl de Laufen	Apostolic Vicar of Araucanía; 1977–2001	Succeeded by Post abolished
Preceded by Diego Gutiérrez Pedraza	Titular Bishop of Gaguari; 1977–2001	Succeeded by Francisco Moreno Barrón
