= Bernardo Álvarez =

Bernardo Álvarez may refer to:

- Bernardo Álvarez Afonso (1949–2025), Spanish prelate of the Roman Catholic Church
- Bernardo Álvarez Herrera (1956–2016), Venezuelan diplomat
- Berni Álvarez (Bernardo Álvarez Merino; born 1971), Spanish basketball player and regional functionary
- Bernardo Andrés Álvarez Tapia (born 1980), Chilean prelate of the Roman Catholic Church, auxiliary bishop of the Archdiocese of Concepción

== See also ==
- Manuel de Bernardo Álvarez del Casal, leader in the war of independence of New Granada
