= La Imperial =

La Imperial may refer to:

- La Imperial, Chile or Antigua [Old] Imperial, a city and former bishopric
- Nueva Imperial, a city 20km from Antigua Imperial
