= Alejandro Menchaca Lira =

Guadeloupean Roman Catholic bishop

- Bishop of Temuco
- Native name: Alejandro Ramón del Corazón de Jesús Menchaca Lira
- Church: Catholic Church
- Diocese: Diocese of Temuco
- In office: 9 August 1941 – 13 September 1960
- Predecessor: Augusto Salinas Fuenzalida
- Successor: Bernardino Piñera
- Other post: Titular Bishop of Pinara (1960-1974)

Orders
- Ordination: 17 December 1927 by Rafael Edwards Salas
- Consecration: 12 October 1941 by Aldo Laghi

Personal details
- Born: 31 August 1903 Concepción, Concepción Province, Chile
- Died: 21 July 1974 (aged 70)

Alejandro Menchaca Lira (31 August 1903 – 21 July 1974) was a Chilean clergyman and bishop for the Roman Catholic Diocese of Temuco. He was born in Concepción, Chile. He became ordained in 1927. He was appointed bishop in 1941. He died on 21 July 1974, at the age of 70.
