= Diocese of Villarrica in Chile =

Catholic diocese in Chile

Diocese of Villarrica Dioecesis Villaricensis Diócesis de Villarrica

Location
- Country: Chile
- Ecclesiastical province: Concepción
- Metropolitan: Concepción

Statistics
- Area: 18,630 km^{2} (7,190 sq mi)
- Population: Total; Catholics: (as of 2010); 401,000; 281,000 (70.1%)

Information
- Rite: Latin Rite
- Established: 16 July 1901 (125 years ago)
- Cathedral: Cathedral of the Sacred Heart in Villarrica
- Patron saint: Sacred Heart

Current leadership
- Pope: Leo XIV
- Bishop: Francisco Javier Stegmeier Schmidlin
- Metropolitan Archbishop: Fernando Natalio Chomali Garib

Website
- diocesisdevillarrica.cl

The Diocese of Villarrica (Latin: Villaricen(sis)) is a diocese located in the city of Villarrica in the ecclesiastical province of Concepción in Chile.

== History ==
- 16 July 1901: Established as Apostolic Prefecture of Araucanía from the Diocese of Concepción and Diocese of San Carlos de Ancud
- 28 March 1928: Promoted as Apostolic Vicariate of Araucanía
- 19 November 2001: Promoted as Diocese of Villarrica

== Bishops ==
=== Ordinaries, in reverse chronological order ===
- Bishops of Villarrica (Roman rite), below
  - Bishop Francisco Javier Stegmeier Schmidlin (2009.02.07 – )
  - Bishop Sixto José Parzinger Foidl, OFMCap (2001.11.19 – 2009.02.07)
- Vicars Apostolic of Araucanía (Roman rite), below
  - Bishop Sixto José Parzinger Foidl, OFMCap (1977.12.17 – 2001.11.19)
  - Bishop Carlos Guillermo Hartl de Laufen, OFMCap (1958.03.05 – 1977.02.06)
  - Bishop Guido Benedetto Beck de Ramberga, OFMCap (1928.03.28 – 1958.03.05)
- Prefect Apostolic of Araucanía (Roman rite), below
  - Bishop Guido Benedetto Beck de Ramberga, OFMCap (1925.01.20 – 1928.03.28)

=== Coadjutor vicar apostolic ===
- Carlos Guillermo Hartl de Laufen, OFMCap (1956-1958)

=== Other priest of this diocese who became bishop ===
- René Osvaldo Rebolledo Salinas, appointed Bishop of Osorno in 2004

== Sources ==
- GCatholic.org
- Catholic Hierarchy
- Diocese website
