= Diocese of Noba =

Roman Catholic titular see

The Diocese of Noba (Latin: Dioecesis Nobensis) is a former Christian diocese located in present-day Algeria. It is currently a Catholic titular see.

In antiquity, the diocese was centered on the Roman town of Noba, in the province of Mauretania Caesariensis. The Roman town is now lost to history.

We know of various bishops of the diocese. Mesnage, unlike Morcelli, attributes only two bishops to the town, mentioned in 484; While Morcelli a third, Felix, though he could also belong to another town of this name.

Today Noba survives as a titular bishopric. The current bishop is Gilson Andrade da Silva, auxiliary bishop of San Salvador of Bahia.

== Known bishops ==
- Felice (fl.411)
- Verecondo e Miggino † (fl.484)
- William Joseph Trudel (1933–1968)
- Eduardo Koaik (1973–1979)
- Hubert Barbier (1980–1984)
- Romeo Panciroli (1984–2006)
- Fernando Chomali (2006–2009)
- Gilson Andrade da Silva, dal 27 luglio 2011
