= Fernando Chomali =

Chilean Catholic prelate (born 1957)

His Eminence Fernando Chomali
- Cardinal; Metropolitan Archbishop of Santiago de Chile
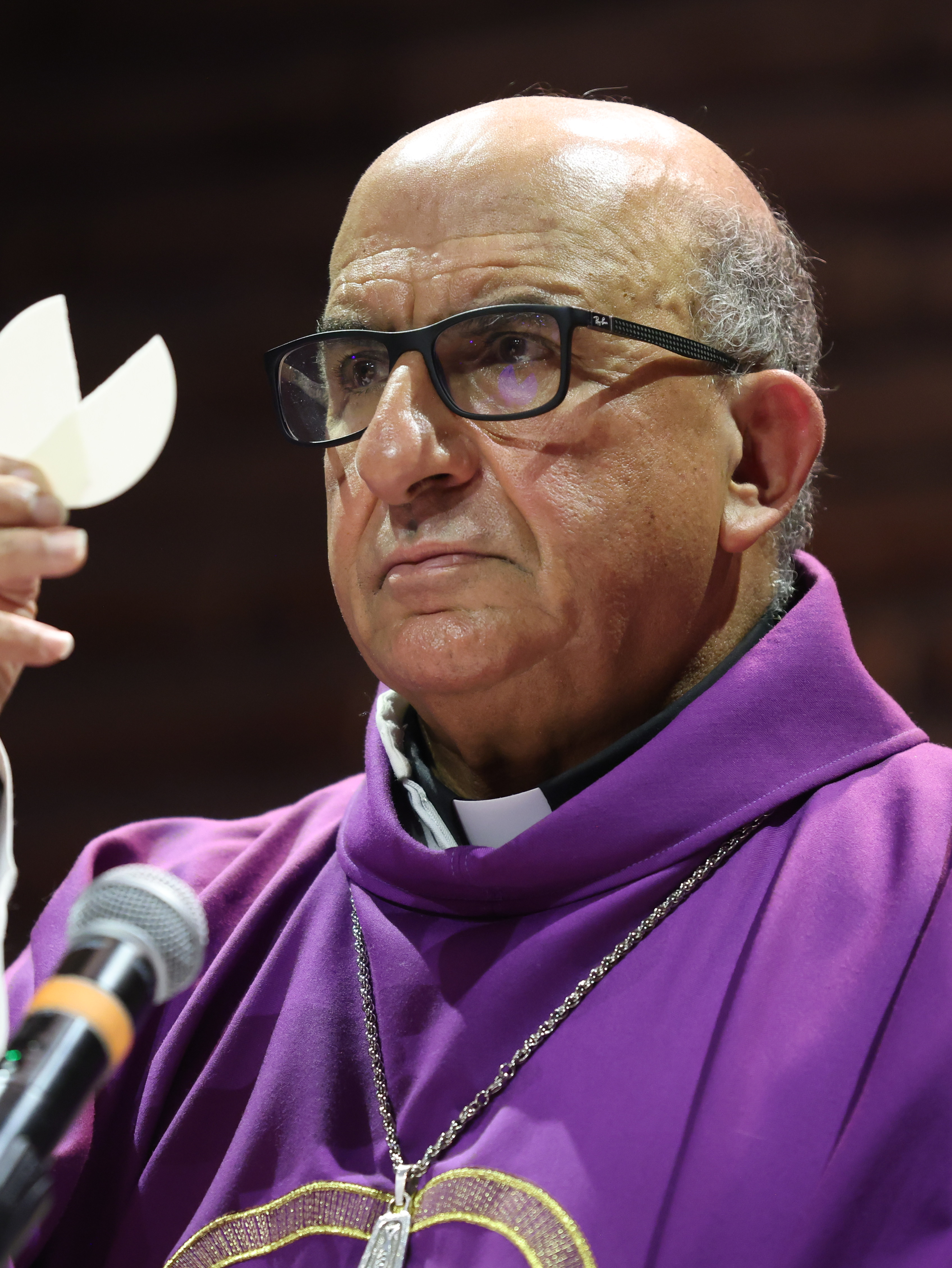
- Chomali in 2025
- Church: Roman Catholic Church
- Archdiocese: Santiago de Chile
- Province: Santiago de Chile
- Metropolis: Santiago de Chile
- Appointed: 25 October 2023
- Installed: 16 December 2023
- Predecessor: Celestino Aós Braco
- Other posts: Cardinal-Priest of San Mauro Abate (2024–); Chancellor of the Pontifical Catholic University of Chile
- Previous posts: Auxiliary bishop of Santiago de Chile (2006–2011); Metropolitan Archbishop of Concepción (2011–2023)

Orders
- Ordination: 6 April 1991 by Carlos Oviedo Cavada
- Consecration: 3 June 2006 by Aldo Cavalli, Ricardo Ezzati Andrell, and Cristián Contreras Villarroel
- Created cardinal: 7 December 2024 by Pope Francis
- Rank: Cardinal-Priest

Personal details
- Born: Fernando Natalio Chomali Garib; 10 March 1957 (age 69) Santiago, Chile
- Denomination: Catholic Church
- Occupation: Archbishop, Prelate
- Education: Pontifical Catholic University of Chile; Pontifical Gregorian University; John Paul II Pontifical Theological Institute for Marriage and Family Sciences
- Motto: Mihi Vivere Christus Est
- Coat of arms

Fernando Natalio Chomali Garib (born 10 March 1957) is a Chilean Catholic prelate who has served as Archbishop of Santiago de Chile since 2023. He was previously Auxiliary Bishop of Santiago de Chile from 2006 to 2011 and Archbishop of Concepción from 2011 to 2023. He was made a cardinal in 2024.

== Biography ==
Fernando Natalio Chomali Garib was born on 10 March 1957 in Santiago de Chile, one of five children born to Juan Chomali Celse and Vitalia Garib Aguad; he has described himself as "a descendant of a Palestinian". He studied at the Colegio de Alianza Francesa and the National Institute of Santiago. He earned a degree in civil engineering at the Pontifical Catholic University of Chile in 1981 and then studied philosophy and theology at the Pontifical Major Seminary of Santiago beginning in 1984. He was ordained a priest on 6 April 1991 by archbishop Carlos Oviedo Cavada.

In Rome, he earned a licentiate in moral theology from the Pontifical Alphonsian Academy in 1993, a doctorate in theology from the Pontifical Gregorian University in 1994, and a master's degree in bioethics from the John Paul II Pontifical Theological Institute for Marriage and Family Sciences in 1998. He has worked as a parish vicar, episcopal delegate for university pastoral care, professor of moral theology and bioethics in the Faculties of Theology and Medicine of the Pontifical Catholic University of Chile and in the Major Seminary of Santiago; as parish priest of Santa María de la Misericordia, moderator of the Curia and president delegate of the Economic Council of the archdiocese.

He has been a member of the Pontifical Academy for Life since 2001. From 2010 to 2012 he was a member of its steering committee. His membership was most recently renewed in 2017.

On 6 April 2006, Pope Benedict XVI appointed him titular bishop of Noba and auxiliary bishop of Santiago de Chile. He received his episcopal consecration on 3 June from Aldo Cavalli, the apostolic nuncio to Chile.

=== Archbishop of Concepción ===
On 20 April 2011, Pope Benedict promoted him as archbishop of Concepción.

He served from March 2014 to March 2015 as apostolic administrator of the Diocese of Osorno. In the final days of that assignment, he met with Pope Francis and tried without success to impress upon him the impact his appointment of Juan Barros as Osorno's new bishop was having. Chomali had long been friends with Juan Carlos Cruz, who was charging Barros with failure to protect him from sexual abuse.

On 10 September 2018, in a pastoral letter on the sexual abuse crisis, he called for the Church to cooperate fully with civil authorities: "We must obey the law because we are not above the norms that govern the country." He regretted that Church had lost its reputation as "a voice for the voiceless" and had become "for a growing percentage of the population ... a cause of scandal, of profound questioning, of much distrust and little credibility". He decried the impact of clericalism and proposed separating the offices that handle complaints of abuse from other diocesan offices and new rules to create transparency for seminaries and church judicial proceedings.

He became vice president of the Episcopal Conference of Chile on 28 July 2021. On 19 December 2021, following the election of Gabriel Boric as the president of Chile, he hoped that the new president would value "the family as the place where people learn to grow", and that he would act decisively in favour of the most vulnerable and weak in society. He also encouraged the president-elect to promote employment, "because it is a privileged path to overcome the poverty that afflicts many Chileans."

=== Archbishop of Santiago ===
On 25 October 2023, Pope Francis named him Metropolitan Archbishop of Santiago. He was installed there on 16 December.

As archbishop, in December 2024, he re-authorised the celebration of the Tridentine Mass in the archdiocese, after four years of having been prohibited by his predecessor.

=== Cardinalate ===
On 6 October 2024, Pope Francis announced that he planned to make Chomali a cardinal on 8 December, a date that was later changed to 7 December. Shortly after the announcement, he reacted on his X account: "I'm very excited. I hope to be a contribution to the Chilean Church.

On 7 December 2024, Pope Francis made him a cardinal, assigning him as Cardinal-Priest of San Mauro Abate.

He participated as a cardinal elector in the 2025 papal conclave that elected Pope Leo XIV.

== Coat of arms ==
As auxiliary bishop

As archbishop

As cardinal

== See also ==
- Catholic Church in Chile
- Cardinals created by Pope Francis
