= Luis Jerónimo de Oré =

Fray Luis Jerónimo de Oré y Rojas (Huamanga, Perú, 1554 - Concepción, 1630) was a creole Franciscan priest who was born during the early years of the Viceroyalty of Peru. He was the son of the conquistador and encomendero Antonio de Oré Río and of Luisa Díaz Rojas, daughter of Pedro Díaz, encomendero of Azángaro.

== Early years ==
The early life of Luis Jerónimo took place between that city and the town of Canaria, a workplace that his father founded, and where he came into contact with speakers of Quechua and Aymara. His years in the Andes overlapped with the Taki Unquy, which began in southern Huamanga, between 1565-1566, and with its eradication, which suggests that he lived in an environment of intense campaigns of evangelism and profound religious feeling throughout the region.

His father settled in Huamanga, where he received an encomienda. His four sons (Antonio, Luis Jerónimo, Pedro and Dionisio) entered into the Franciscan order. His five daughters were also inclined to the religious life, and Antonio de Oré managed to find the means to found the convent of Santa Clara, the first in Huamanga and the second in the Viceroyalty of Perú. He taught his five sons to read Latin, which permitted Luis Jerónimo and his brothers to read texts. Later, he would become mayor of Huamanga (1571).

== Life as a Franciscan ==
Having been ordained in Lima, Luis Jerónimo de Oré participated in the translation of the texts produced by the Third Lima Council (1582-1583), among others, the "Catecismo para instrucción de los indios" (Catechism for the instruction of the Indians), the "Confesionario" (Confessional) and various instructional texts. As a result of this experience, in 1598 the Franciscan published his most influential work and the first scientific work written in Spanish, Latin, Quechua, and Aymara: the Symbolo Catholico Indiano, printed in Lima in 1598. Evidently, his experience as a multilingual preacher was helpful to the work of the evangelists during the colonial period. In his work, Oré proposed that the Native Americans should only be taught not only with Gregorian chant, but also in polyphony, by competent teachers. They were to study music "because all this music will lead the way to their conversion". As one might expect, since it was a print book and not copied by hand as a manuscript, the book was an editorial success for the period.

In Naples his work Rituale seu Manuale Peruanorum (1607), a polyglot manual in quechua, aimara, puquina, mochica, and guarani for clerics who worked in the West Indies, was published. During his time in Europe, Oré he recruited priests for the spiritual "conquest" of Florida, since he had been named commissioner of that Franciscan province, to which he would make various trips. In 1612, he visited the Inca Garcilaso de la Vega in Córdoba. In about 1617, he published Relación de los mártires que a avido en las provincias de la Florida in Madrid.

== Episcopate ==
After this period, Luis Jerónimo de Oré was named Bishop of the Roman Catholic Archdiocese of Concepción in its old headquarters of Concepción (Chile), when that city was part of the commune of Penco. He carried out this work from 1623 until 1630.
