= Jorge Hourton =

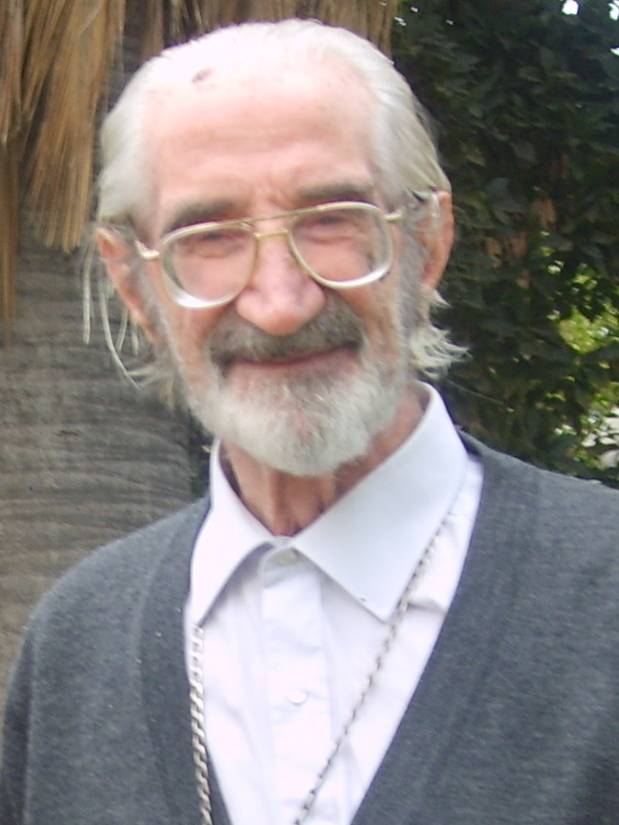
Jorge Hourton in 2008

Jorge María Hourton Poisson (May 27, 1926 – December 5, 2011) was the Roman Catholic titular bishop of Materiana and, in 1992–2001, the auxiliary bishop of the Roman Catholic Diocese of Temuco, Chile.

Born in France, he acquired Chilean nationality and studied at the Seminary of Santiago and the Theology school of the Pontifical Catholic University of Chile. Being ordained to the priesthood in 1949, Hourton Poisson became a bishop in 1969 retiring in 2001.
