= Sergio Hernán Pérez de Arce Arraigada =

Chilean Catholic Archbishop and Prelate

His Excellency, The Most Reverend, Monsignor. Don. Sergio Hernán Pérez de Arce Arraigada, SS.CC.
- Metropolitan Archbishop-designate of Concepción
- Church: Roman Catholic Church
- Archdiocese: Concepción
- Province: Concepción
- Metropolis: Concepción
- Appointed: 16 May 2024
- Predecessor: Don. Fernando Chomalí Garib
- Successor: Incumbent
- Previous posts: Apostolic Administrator of the diocese of San Bartolomé de Chilián (2018-2020); Bishop of San Bartolomé de Chilián (2020-2024)

Orders
- Ordination: December 1990
- Consecration: 11 July 2020 by Alberto Ortega Martín
- Rank: Metropolitan archbishop

Personal details
- Born: Sergio Hernán Pérez de Arce Arraigada; August 26, 1963 (age 63) Concepción, Chile.
- Denomination: Catholic Church
- Occupation: Archbishop, Prelate
- Education: Pontifical Catholic University of Chile (S.T.L.)

Sergio Hernán Pérez de Arce Arraigada, SS.CC. (born 26 August 1963) is a Chilean Catholic prelate and a professed member of the Congregation of the Sacred Hearts of Jesus and Mary or The Picpus Father. He has been Metropolitan Archbishop of the Metropolitan Archdiocese of Concepción since May 2024. He was the Bishop of diocese of San Bartolomé de Chilián since 2020. He previously worked as apostolic administrator of the same diocese since 2018. He previously became delegate for receiving reports of abuse in the Chilean SS.CC. province secretary of the Episcopal Conference.

== Biography ==
Don. Sergio Hernán Pérez de Arce Arraigada was born in Concepción, Chile on 26 August 1963. He took his solemn oath as a member of the Congregation of the Sacred Hearts of Jesus and Mary (the "Picpus Fathers") in 1982. He was ordained a priest of the same congregation in Valparaíso in December 1990. After his ordination, he attained the licentiate degree in theology from the Pontifical Catholic University of Chile. From 2005 to 2011 he served as provincial superior. From 2011 to 2014 he became a president of the Conference of Religious of Chile and member of the National Council for the prevention of abuse and the accompaniment of victims. In February 2020, Pope Francis appointed him as Bishop of diocese of San Bartolomé de Chilián. He receive his episcopal consecration on 11 July. Pope Francis appointed him as Metropolitan Archbishop of the Metropolitan Archdiocese of Concepción on 16 May 2024. He has been a secretary general of the Episcopal Conference of Chile since 2021.
