= Bernardo Andrés Álvarez Tapia =

The Most Reverend Bernardo Andrés Álvarez Tapia
- Auxiliary Bishop of Concepción
- Church: Catholic Church
- Diocese: Archdiocese of Concepción
- Appointed: 23 February 2022

Orders
- Ordination: 21 November 2009
- Consecration: 30 April 2022 by Fernando Natalio Chomalí Garib

Personal details
- Born: 4 August 1980 (age 46) Talcahuano, Chile
- Denomination: Roman Catholic

Bernardo Andrés Álvarez Tapia (born 4 August 1980) is a Chilean Roman Catholic prelate who has served as Auxiliary Bishop of the Roman Catholic Archdiocese of Concepción since 2022.

== Early life and education ==
Bernardo Andrés Álvarez Tapia was born on 4 August 1980 in Talcahuano, Chile. He pursued his formation for the priesthood in the Archdiocese of Concepción and completed studies in philosophy and theology, earning a Licentiate in Religious Sciences and Ecclesiastical Studies.

== Priestly ministry ==
Álvarez Tapia was ordained a priest for the Archdiocese of Concepción on 21 November 2009. He served in parish ministry, holding roles such as parish vicar, parish administrator, and rector of several parishes before assuming leadership positions in diocesan structures and seminary formation.

== Episcopal appointment ==
On 23 February 2022, Pope Francis appointed Álvarez Tapia Auxiliary Bishop of Concepción and Titular Bishop of Teuzi.

== Episcopal consecration and ministry ==
Álvarez Tapia received his episcopal consecration on 30 April 2022. The principal consecrator was Archbishop Fernando Natalio Chomalí Garib, with Archbishop Alberto Ortega Martín and Bishop Sergio Hernán Pérez de Arce Arriagada serving as principal co-consecrators.

As Auxiliary Bishop, he assists in pastoral governance, sacramental duties, and administrative responsibilities within the Archdiocese of Concepción.
