= San Mauro Abate =

- Church of Saint Maurus the Abbot
- Chiesa Parrocchiale di San Mauro Abate
- Location within Rome
- 41°48′43″N 12°29′02″E
- Location: Via Francesco Sapori, Fonte Ostiense, Rome
- Country: Italy
- Language: Italian
- Denomination: Catholic
- Tradition: Roman Rite

History
- Status: titular church, parish church
- Dedication: Saint Maurus
- Consecrated: 1990

Architecture
- Functional status: active
- Architect(s): Anna Claudia Cenciarini and Ferdinando Sciamanna
- Architectural type: Modern
- Years built: 1990

Administration
- Diocese: Rome

San Mauro Abate is a 20th-century parochial church and titular church in southern Rome, dedicated to Saint Maurus the Abbot (AD 512–584).

== History ==
The church was built in 1990 to a design by Anna Claudia Cenciarini and Ferdinando Sciamanna.

On 7 December 2024, Pope Francis made it a titular church to be held by a cardinal-priest.

Cardinal-protectors

- Fernando Chomalí Garib (2024 – present)
