= Diocese of Valdivia =

Roman Catholic diocese in Chile

Diocese of Valdivia Dioecesis Valdiviensis Diócesis de Valdivia

Catholic
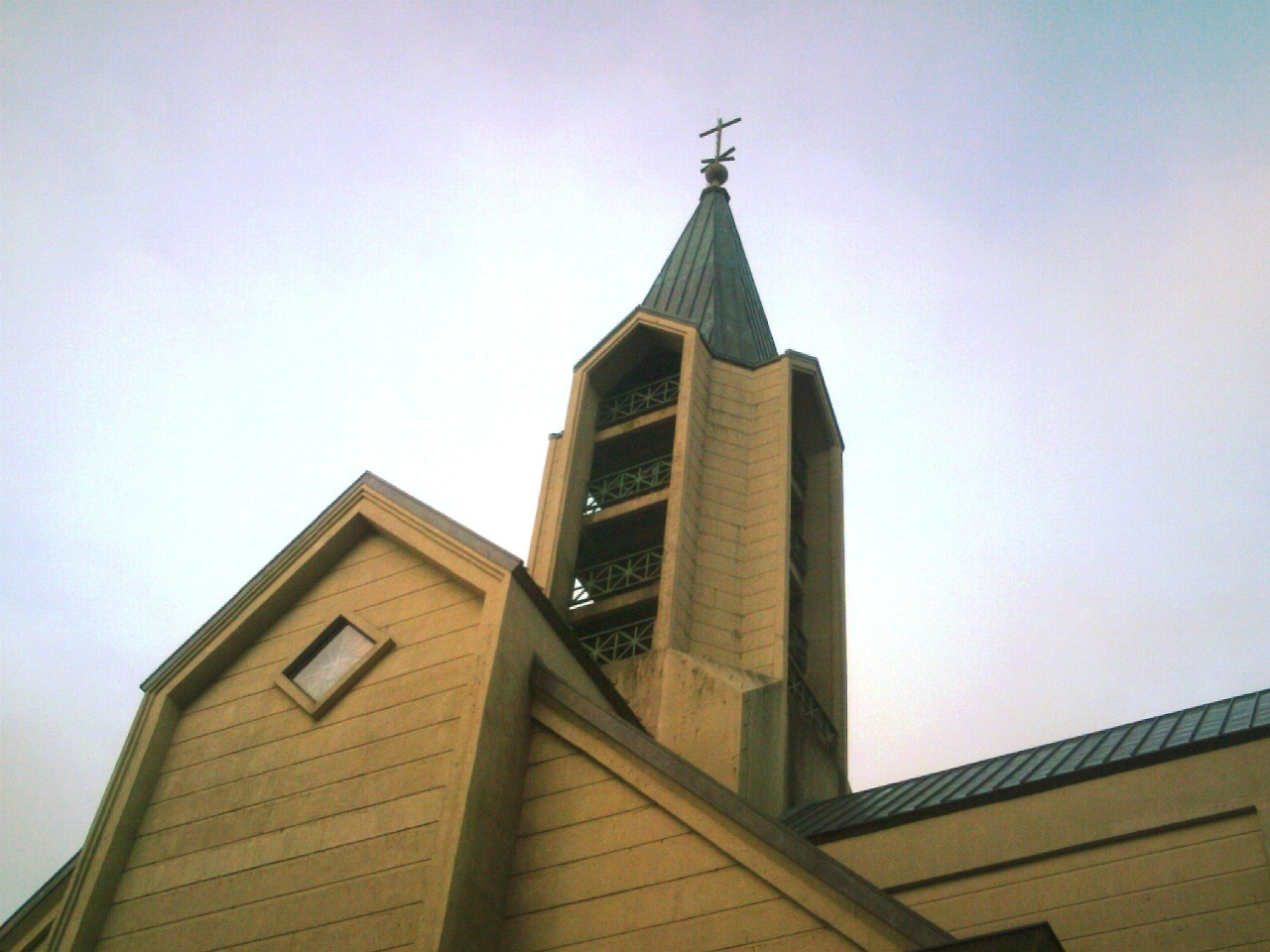
- Cathedral of Our Lady of the Rosary

Location
- Country: Chile
- Ecclesiastical province: Concepción
- Metropolitan: Concepción

Statistics
- Area: 13,679 km^{2} (5,281 sq mi)
- Population: Total; Catholics: (as of 2010); 297,000; 237,000 (79.8%)

Information
- Rite: Latin Rite
- Established: 14 June 1910 (116 years ago)
- Cathedral: Catedral Nuestra Señora del Rosario
- Patron saint: Our Lady of the Rosary

Current leadership
- Pope: Leo XIV
- Bishop: Santiago Jaime Silva Retamales
- Metropolitan Archbishop: Fernando Natalio Chomali Garib

Website
- www.obispadodevaldivia.cl

The Roman Catholic Diocese of Valdivia (Latin: Valdivien(sis)) is a Latin Rite suffragan diocese in the ecclesiastical province of Concepción in Chile.

Its cathedral episcopal see is Catedral Nuestra Señora del Rosario, dedicated to Our Lady of the Rosary, in the city of Valdivia, Los Ríos.

== History ==
- 14 June 1910: Established as Mission “sui iuris” of Valdivia, on territory split off from the Diocese of San Carlos de Ancud
- 25 September 1924: Promoted as Apostolic Administration of Valdivia
- 8 July 1944: Promoted as Diocese of Valdivia
- Lost territory on 1955.11.15 to establish the Diocese of Osorno

== Statistics ==
As per 2014, it pastorally served 145,500 Catholics (47.2% of 308,000 total) on 13,679 km² in 17 parishes with 27 priests (10 diocesan, 17 religious), 28 deacons, 60 lay religious (18 brothers, 42 sisters) and 2 seminarians

== Ordinaries ==
(all Roman rite)

Ecclesiastical Superior of the independent mission
Augusto Klinke Leier (1910.06.19 – 1924.09.25)

permanent Apostolic Administrators of Valdivia

- Apostolic Administrator ad nutum Sanctae Sedis Augusto Klinke Leier (1924.09.25 – 1928.11.14)
- Teodoro Eugenín Barrientos, SSCC (1931.04.10 – 1942.06.20)

Suffragan Bishops of Valdivia

- Arturo Mery Beckdorf (1944.07.29 – 1955.04.20), appointed Coadjutor Archbishop of Concepción (Santissima Concezione)
- José Manuel Santos Ascarza, OCD (1955.09.21 – 1983.05.03)
- Alejandro Jiménez Lafeble (1983.12.12 – 1996.02.29)
- Apostolic Administrator Sergio Otoniel Contreras Navia (1995.04.29 – 1996.09.08)
- Ricardo Ezzati Andrello, SDB (1996.06.28 – 2001.07.10)
- Ignacio Francisco Ducasse Medina (2002.05.31 – 8 June 2017)
- Apostolic Administrator Fr. Gonzalo Espina Peruyero (26 August 2017 - 23 December 2020)
- Santiago Jaime Silva Retamales (23 December 2020 - )

== See also ==
- List of Catholic dioceses in Chile

== Sources and external links ==
- GCatholic.org – data for all sections
- Diocese website
- Catholic Hierarchy
