= Alfredo Torero =

Peruvian anthropologist (1930–2004)

Alfredo Augusto Torero Fernández de Córdova (September 10, 1930 in Huacho, Lima Region, Peru – June 19, 2004 in Valencia, Spain) was a Peruvian anthropologist and linguist.

== Biography ==
He was a student at the National University of San Marcos, from which he graduated in the early 1960s, and then traveled to France, where he continued his doctorate at the University of Paris. There he obtained a doctorate in 1965, under the direction of the linguist André Martinet, with his thesis Le puquina, la troisième langue générale du Pérou.

Alfredo Torero came to prominence thanks to his article "The Dialects of Quechua" in 1964 and ranks among the founders of Andean linguistics. Much of his work is characterised by bringing into his linguistic investigations also cultural aspects of the Andean peoples. Besides Quechua and Aymara, he researched extinct languages such as Mochica and Puquina.

The present classification of the Quechua language family is based fundamentally on his analysis and that of Gary Parker, who, independently, came to similar conclusions.

He found that Quechua clearly did not originate, as is still often believed, in the region of the Inca capital Cuzco, but almost certainly somewhere considerably further north in Central Peru. Torero's proposed precise homeland for Quechua was the central coast of Peru in the Lima Region, but that remains both unproven and challenged by other linguists.

The Alfredo Torero auditorium at the Faculty of Letters and Human Sciences, National University of San Marcos in Lima is named after him.

== Bibliography ==
- "Los dialectos quechuas". Anales Científicos de la Universidad Agraria, 2, pp. 446–478. Lima, 1964.
- "Lingüística e historia de la Sociedad Andina", Anales Científicos de la Universidad Agraria, VIII, 3-4. Lima, 1970.
- El quechua y la historia social andina. Lima, Universidad Ricardo Palma. 240 p., 1974.
- "La familia lingüística quechua". En: Pottier, Bernard (ed.) América Latina en sus lenguas indígenas. Caracas; Monte Avila Editores, C.A. pp. 61–92., 1983.
- "El comercio lejano y la difusión del quechua. El caso del Ecuador". Revista Andina, pp. 367–402, Cusco, 1984.
- "Áreas toponímicas e idiomas en la sierra norte peruana: un trabajo de recuperación lingüística". En: Revista Andina, pp. 217–257, Cusco, 1986.
- "Procesos lingüísticos e identificación de dioses en los Andes centrales". En: Revista Andina, pp. 237–263, Cusco, 1990.
- "Los sibilantes del quechua yunga y del castellano en el siglo XVI". En: Calvo Pérez, Julio (ed) Estudios de lengua y cultura amerindias I, Valencia: Universidad de Valencia, Departamento de teoría de los lenguajes, p. 241-254, 1994.
- "Entre Roma y Lima: El Lexicón quichua de fray Domingo de Santo Tomás [1560]". En: Zimmermann, Klaus (ed). La descripción de las lenguas amerindias en la época colonial (Bibliotheca Ibero-Americana, 63), pp. 271–290. 1997.
- "El marco histórico-geográfico en la interacción quechua-aru". En: Dedenbach-Salazar Sáenz, Sabine; Arellano Hoffmann, Carmen; König, Eva; Prümers, Heiko (ed) 50 años de estudios americanistas en la Universidad de Bonn: nuevas contribuciones a la arqueología, etnohistoria, etnolingüística y etnografía de las Américas = 50 years americanist studies at the University of Bonn: new contributions to the archaeo (Bonner Amerikanistische Studien, 30 / Estudios americanistas de Bonn, 30), pp. 601–630. 1998.
- Idiomas de los Andes. Lingüística e historia. Lima, IFEA. 565 p. 2002. This compendious work gathers together much of Torero's thinking published in numerous articles over the course of his career.
