= Bernardino Piñera =

Chilean Catholic archbishop (1915–2020)

The Most Reverend Bernardino Piñera Carvallo
- Archbishop Emeritus of La Serena
- Church: Roman Catholic Church
- Archdiocese: La Serena
- See: La Serena
- Appointed: 1 July 1983
- Installed: 7 August 1983
- Term ended: 29 September 1990
- Predecessor: Juan Francisco Fresno Larraín
- Successor: Francisco José Cox Huneeus
- Previous posts: Auxiliary Bishop of Talca (1958–60); Titular Bishop of Prusias ad Hypium (1958–60); Bishop of Temuco (1960–77); President of the Chilean Episcopal Conference (1983–87)

Orders
- Ordination: 5 April 1947 by José María Caro Rodríguez
- Consecration: 27 April 1958 by Manuel Larraín Errazuriz

Personal details
- Born: Bernardino Piñera Carvallo; 22 September 1915 Paris, France
- Died: 21 June 2020 (aged 104) Santiago, Chile
- Motto: Servus Tuus sum ego

Styles of Bernardino Piñera Carvallo
- Reference style: The Most Reverend
- Spoken style: Your Excellency
- Religious style: Monsignor

Monsignor Bernardino Piñera Carvallo (22 September 1915 – 21 June 2020) was a Chilean bishop of the Roman Catholic Church.

== Life ==
Born in Paris, France, Piñera was ordained a priest on 5 April 1947. He worked for the Catholic Action. On 11 February 1958, Pope Pius XII appointed Piñera Carvallo auxiliary bishop of Talca. Later, he was appointed Bishop of Temuco (1960–77) and Archbishop of La Serena (1983–90). From 1983 to 1988, he was president of the Episcopal Conference of Chile. Piñera Carvallo attended the Second Vatican Council from 1962 to 1965. He was the paternal uncle of Sebastián Piñera, the president of Chile.

=== Vatican sex abuse investigation ===
On 21 August 2019, Chile's nuncio Ivo Scapolo announced that the Vatican had launched an investigation into claims that Piñera sexually abused at least one child 50 years earlier. No charges were ever filed, however.

=== Death ===
Msgr Piñera died in Santiago on 21 June 2020, aged 104. Piñera had contracted COVID-19 a month earlier during the COVID-19 pandemic in Chile. Although the government initially denied the disease to be the cause of death, the certificate issued by the Civil Registry and Identification Service indicates "pneumonia due to COVID-19" as the cause. At the time of his death, he was the oldest Catholic bishop in the world, and the last surviving bishop appointed by Pius XII.
