= Archdiocese of Concepción =

Catholic ecclesiastical territory

Coordinates: 36.8276°S 73.0514°W

Archdiocese of Concepción Archidioecesis Sanctissimae Conceptionis Arquidiócesis de Concepción

Catholic
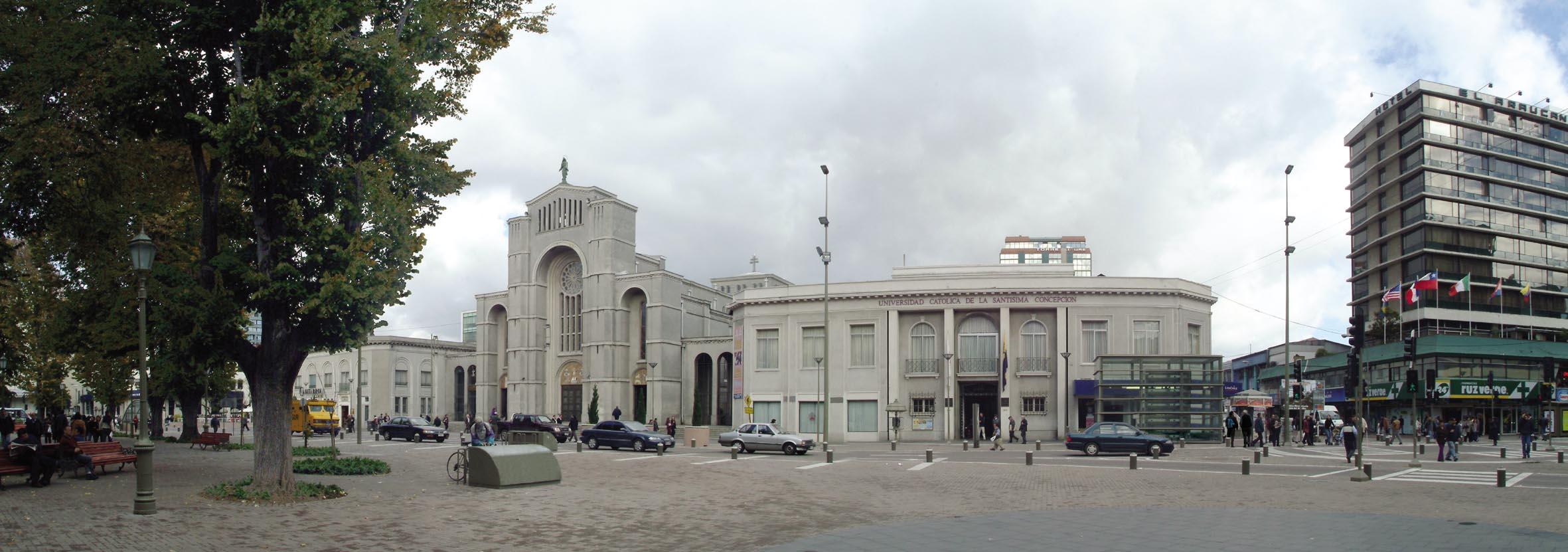
- Cathedral of the Immaculate Conception

Location
- Country: Chile
- Ecclesiastical province: Concepción

Statistics
- Area: 11,330 km^{2} (4,370 sq mi)
- Population: Total; Catholics: (as of 2006); 1,176,000; 612,000 (52.0%)

Information
- Rite: Latin Rite
- Established: 22 March 1563 (463 years ago)
- Cathedral: Cathedral of the Immaculate Conception
- Patron saint: Immaculate Conception

Current leadership
- Pope: Leo XIV
- Metropolitan Archbishop: Mons. Sergio Hernán Pérez de Arce Arraigada, SS.CC.
- Auxiliary Bishops: Bernardo Andrés Álvarez Tapia; Óscar Walter García Barreto

Map

Website
- www.arzobispadodeconcepcion.cl

The Roman Catholic Archdiocese of Concepción (Latin: Sanctissimae Conceptionis) is an archdiocese located in the city of Concepción in Chile.

== History ==
- 22 March 1563: Established as Diocese of La Imperial from the Diocese of Santiago de Chile
- 1603: Renamed as Diocese of Concepción
- 20 May 1939: Promoted as Metropolitan Archdiocese of Concepción

== Ordinaries ==
=== Bishops of La Imperial ===
- Antonio Avendaño y Paz, OFM (22 Mar 1564 – 9 Mar 1588 Appointed, Bishop of Quito)
- Agustín de Cisneros Montesa (9 Mar 1589 – 1596 Died)
- Reginaldo de Lizárraga, OP (31 Aug 1598 – 20 Jul 1609 Appointed, Bishop of Paraguay)

=== Bishops of Concepción ===
- Carlos Marcelo Corni Velazquez (18 Oct 1618 – 17 Aug 1620 Appointed, Bishop of Trujillo)
- Luis Jerónimo Oré, OFM (17 Aug 1620 – 30 Jan 1630 Died)
- Diego de Zambrana de Villalobos y Cordero (14 Mar 1633 – 12 Dec 1652 Died)
- Dionisio de Cimbrón, OCist (23 Jun 1653 – 19 Sep 1661 Died)
- Francisco de Loyola y Vergara, OSA (15 Jul 1669 – Nov 1677 Died)
- Antonio de Morales, OP (25 May 1682 – Dec 1683 Died)
- Luis de Lemos y Usategui, OSA (16 Sep 1686 – 27 Nov 1692 Resigned)
- Martín de Híjar y Mendoza, OSA (13 Apr 1693 – 15 May 1704 Died)
- Diego Montero del Aguila (3 Oct 1708 – 21 Jan 1715 Appointed, Bishop of Trujillo)
- Juan de Necolalde (1 Apr 1715 – 12 May 1723 Appointed, Archbishop of La Plata o Charcas)
- Juan Francisco Antonio de Escandón, CR (12 May 1723 – 18 Jun 1731 Appointed, Archbishop of Lima)
- Salvador Bermúdez y Becerra (18 Jun 1731 – 28 Feb 1734 Confirmed, Bishop of La Paz)
- Andrés Paredes Polanco y Armendáriz (28 Feb 1734- 28 Feb 1735, became Bishop of Quito)
- Pedro Felipe de Azúa e Iturgoyen (28 Feb 1735 – 18 Dec 1744 Confirmed, Archbishop of Santafé en Nueva Granada)
- José de Toro y Zambrano (18 Dec 1744 – 1 May 1760 Died)
- Pedro Ángel de Espiñeira, OFM (23 Nov 1761 – 9 Feb 1778 Died)
- Francisco José Marán (1 Mar 1779 – 12 Sep 1794 Appointed, Bishop of Santiago de Chile)
- Tomás de Roa y Alarcón (12 Sep 1794 – 5 Sep 1805 Died)
- Diego Antonio Navarro Martín de Villodras (26 Aug 1806 – 16 Mar 1818 Confirmed, Archbishop of La Plata o Charcas)
- José Ignacio Cienfuegos Arteaga (17 Dec 1832 – 27 Apr 1840 Retired)
- Diego Antonio Elizondo y Prado (27 Apr 1840 – 5 Oct 1852 Died)
- José Hipólito Salas y Toro (23 Jun 1854 – 20 Jul 1883 Died)
- Fernando Blaitt Mariño (17 Dec 1886 – 14 Jul 1887 Died)
- Plácido Labarca Olivares (26 Jun 1890 – 9 Oct 1905 Died)
- Luis Enrique Izquierdo Vargas (29 Jan 1906 – 7 Aug 1917 Died)
- Gilberto Fuenzalida Guzmán (20 Feb 1918 – 24 Mar 1938 Died)

=== Archbishops of Concepción ===
- Alfredo Silva Santiago (4 February 1939 – 27 April 1963 Resigned)
- Manuel Sánchez Beguiristáin (25 June 1963 – 3 May 1983 Retired)
- José Manuel Santos Ascarza, OCD (3 May 1983 – 29 July 1988 Resigned)
- Antonio Moreno Casamitjana (14 October 1989 – 27 December 2006 Retired)
- Ricardo Ezzati Andrello, SDB (27 December 2006 – 15 December 2010 Appointed, Archbishop of Santiago de Chile; Cardinal in 2014)
- Fernando Chomalí Garib (20 April 2011 Appointed – 25 October 2023)
- Sergio Hernán Pérez de Arce Arraigada, SS.CC.(16 May 2024 - ...)

== Other affiliated bishops ==
=== Coadjutor archbishop ===
- Arturo Mery Beckdorf (1955–1963), did not succeed to see; appointed Coadjutor Archbishop of La Serena

=== Auxiliary bishops ===
- Pedro Felipe de Azúa e Iturgoyen (1735–1742), appointed Bishop here
- Carlos Oviedo Cavada, OdeM (1964–1974), appointed Archbishop of Antofagasta; future Cardinal
- Sergio Otoniel Contreras Navia (1974–1977), appointed Bishop of Temuco
- Alejandro Goić Karmelić (1979–1991), appointed Auxiliary Bishop of Talca
- Pedro Felipe Bacarreza Rodríguez (1991–2006), appointed Bishop of Los Angeles
- Tomislav Koljatic Maroevic (1997–2003), appointed Bishop of Linares
- Pedro Mario Ossandón Buljevic (2008–2011), appointed Auxiliary Bishop of Santiago de Chile

=== Other priests of this diocese who became bishops ===
- Alonso del Pozo y Silva, appointed Bishop of Córdoba (Tucumán), Argentina in 1713
- José Antonio Humeres y Miranda, appointed Bishop of Panamá in 1777
- Andrés Quintian Ponte de Andrade, appointed Bishop of Cuenca, Ecuador in 1805
- Ricardo Sepúlveda Hermosilla, appointed Vicar General of Temuco in 1908 (titular bishop in 1911)
- Reinaldo Muñoz Olave, appointed Vicar General of Chillán (and titular bishop) in 1916

== Suffragan dioceses ==
- San Bartolomé de Chillán
- Santa Maria de Los Ángeles
- Temuco
- Valdivia
- Villarrica

== Sources ==
- GCatholic.org
- Catholic Hierarchy
- Diocese website
