= List of Catholic dioceses in Chile =

Map of ecclesiastical jurisdictions of Chile.

The Catholic Church in Chile comprises five ecclesiastical provinces each headed by an archbishop. The provinces are in turn subdivided into 19 dioceses and 6 archdioceses each headed by a bishop or an archbishop. There is also one Territorial Prelature, one Apostolic Vicariate and one Military Ordinariate in Chile. The bishops of Chile form the Episcopal Conference of Chile.

== List of dioceses ==
=== Ecclesiastical province of Antofagasta ===
- Archdiocese of Antofagasta (1881; diocese 1928; archdiocese 1967)
  - Diocese of Arica (1959; diocese 1986)
  - Diocese of Iquique (1880; diocese 1929)
  - Diocese of San Juan Bautista de Calama (1965; diocese 2010)

=== Ecclesiastical province of Concepción ===
- Archdiocese of Concepción (1563; archdiocese 1939)
  - Diocese of Chillán (1916; diocese 1925)
  - Diocese of Santa María de Los Ángeles (1959)
  - Diocese of Temuco (1908; diocese 1925)
  - Diocese of Valdivia (1910; diocese 1944)
  - Diocese of Villarrica (1901; diocese 2001)

=== Ecclesiastical province of La Serena ===
- Archdiocese of La Serena (1840; archdiocese 1939)
  - Diocese of Copiapó (1946; diocese 1957)
  - Territorial Prelature of Illapel (1960)

=== Ecclesiastical province of Puerto Montt ===
- Archdiocese of Puerto Montt (1939; archdiocese 1963)
  - Diocese of Osorno (1955)
  - Diocese of Punta Arenas (1883; diocese 1947)
  - Diocese of San Carlos de Ancud (1840)

=== Ecclesiastical province of Santiago de Chile ===
- Archdiocese of Santiago de Chile (1561; archdiocese 1840)
  - Diocese of Linares (1925)
  - Diocese of Melipilla (1991)
  - Diocese of Rancagua (1925)
  - Diocese of San Bernardo (1987)
  - Diocese of San Filipe (1925)
  - Diocese of Talca (1913; diocese 1925)
  - Diocese of Valparaíso (1872; diocese 1925)

=== Exempt to the Holy See ===
- Military Ordinariate of Chile (bishopric 1910; ordinariate since 1986)
- Apostolic Vicariate of Aisén (1940)
