= Cristián Contreras Molina =

Cristián Contreras Molina O. de M.
- Bishop Emeritus of San Felipe
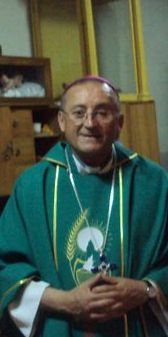
- Church: Catholic Church
- Diocese: Diocese of San Felipe
- In office: 19 July 2002 – 21 September 2018
- Predecessor: Manuel Vial
- Successor: Gonzalo Bravo Álvarez
- Previous post: Prelate of Calama (1992-2002)

Orders
- Ordination: 12 October 1974 by Sotero Sanz Villalba
- Consecration: 5 July 1992 by Carlos Oviedo Cavada

Personal details
- Born: Cristián Enrique Contreras Molina; 8 November 1946 (age 79) Santiago, Chile

Cristián Enrique Contreras Molina (born 8 November 1946) is a native of Chile and a former bishop of the Catholic Church. He was Bishop of San Felipe from 2002 to 2018.

== Biography ==
He was born on 8 November 1946 in Santiago de Chile. He entered the novitiate of the Mercedarians in 1961 and studied philosophy and theology with them and in the Faculty of Theology of the Pontifical Catholic University of Chile, where he obtained a bachelor's degree in Religious Studies in 1974. He took his perpetual vows on 21 September 1973 and he was ordained a priest on 12 October 1974 by Archbishop Sotero Sanz Villalba, Apostolic Nuncio to Chile.

After ordination he worked in various parishes in Valdivia (1975), Calama (1976-1983), and San Felipe (1985). He was appointed Superior and Rector of the College of the Mercedarians in Santiago (1985-1989). In 1990 he was named Major Chaplain of the Gendarmerie and Chaplain of the National Prisons.

On 11 June 1992, Pope John Paul II named him Prelate of Calama and he received his episcopal consecration on 5 July from Cardinal Carlos Oviedo Cavada. He was installed on 19 July.

On 19 July 2002, John Paul appointed him Bishop of San Felipe and he was installed there on 25 August.

On 18 May 2018, Contreras submitted his resignation to Pope Francis, as did all the Chilean bishops at the conclusion of a three-day meeting in Rome. In early September prosecutors launched an investigation based on an accusation of a sexual crime made against Contreras. Pope Francis accepted his resignation on 21 September 2018, replacing him with a priest as Apostolic Administrator, Jaime Ortiz de Lazcano Piquer.

== See also ==
- Catholic Church in Chile
- Catholic sexual abuse cases in Chile
