= Rafael de la Barra Tagle =

Chilean Roman Catholic bishop (1930–2025)

His Excellency Rafael de la Barra Tagle
- Prelate Emeritus of Illapel
- Archdiocese: La Serena
- Appointed: 17 June 1989
- Term ended: 20 February 2010
- Predecessor: Pablo Lizama Riquelme
- Successor: Jorge Patricio Vega Velasco

Orders
- Ordination: 12 June 1954
- Consecration: 9 September 1989 by Juan Francisco Fresno, Giulio Einaudi and Bernardino Piñera

Personal details
- Born: Victor Rafael de la Barra Tagle; 29 October 1930 Santiago, Chile
- Died: 9 October 2025 (aged 94) Santiago, Chile
- Motto: Veni Creator Spiritus

Victor Rafael de la Barra Tagle (29 October 1930 – 9 October 2025) was a Chilean Roman Catholic prelate. He was bishop of Illapel from 1989 to 2010. De la Barra Tagle died on 9 October 2025, at the age of 94.

Catholic Church titles
Preceded by Pablo Lizama Riquelme	Prelate of Illapel; 1989–2010	Succeeded by Jorge Patricio Vega Velasco
