= Territorial Prelature of Illapel =

Catholic particular church territory

Coordinates: 31.6333°S 71.1692°W

Territorial Prelature of Illapel Praelatura Territorialis Ilapensis Prelatura Territorial de Illapel

Catholic
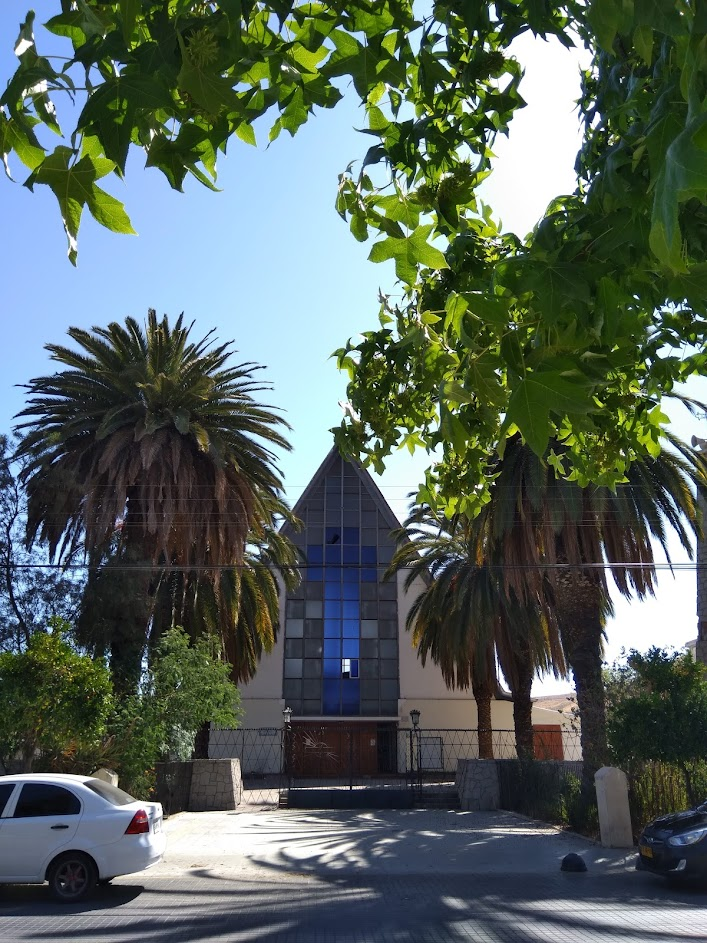
- Cathedral of St Raphael

Location
- Country: Chile
- Ecclesiastical province: La Serena
- Metropolitan: La Serena

Statistics
- Area: 10,350 km^{2} (4,000 sq mi)
- Population: Total; Catholics: (as of 2004); 82,000; 78,000 (95.1%)

Information
- Denomination: Catholic Church
- Rite: Latin Rite
- Established: 30 April 1960 (66 years ago)
- Cathedral: Cathedral of St Raphael in Illapel
- Patron saint: St Raphael the Archangel

Current leadership
- Prelate: Julio Larrondo Yáñez
- Metropolitan Archbishop: René Osvaldo Rebolledo Salinas

Website
- www.iglesia.cl/illapel

The Territorial Prelature of Illapel (Latin: Praelatura Territorialis Ilapensis) is a territorial prelature located in the city of Illapel in the ecclesiastical province of La Serena in Chile.

== History ==
- 30 April 1960: Established as Territorial Prelature of Illapel from the Metropolitan Archdiocese of La Serena and Diocese of San Felipe

== Leadership, in reverse chronological order ==
- Prelates of Illapel (Roman rite)
  - Bishop Julio Larrondo Yáñez (2023.12.12 – Present)
  - Bishop Jorge Patricio Vega Velasco, S.V.D. (2010.02.20 – 2021.06.08), appointed Bishop of Valparaíso
  - Bishop Rafael de la Barra Tagle, S.V.D. (1989.06.17 – 2010.02.20)
  - Bishop Pablo Lizama Riquelme (1985.12.19 – 1988.02.24), appointed Auxiliary Bishop of Talca; future Archbishop
  - Bishop Cirilo Polidoro Van Vlierberghe, O.F.M. (1966.06.27 – 1984.08.11)
  - Bishop Cirilo Polidoro Van Vlierberghe, O.F.M. (Apostolic Administrator 1960 – 1966.06.27)

== Sources ==
- GCatholic.org
- Catholic Hierarchy
- Prelature website
