= Patricio Infante Alfonso =

Chilean Roman Catholic archbishop (1929–2025)

His Excellency Patricio Infante Alfonso
- Archbishop Emeritus of Antagofasta
- Archdiocese: Antagofasta
- Appointed: 12 December 1990
- Term ended: 26 November 2004
- Predecessor: Carlos Oviedo Cavada
- Successor: Pablo Lizama Riquelme
- Previous posts: Auxiliary Bishop of Santiago de Chile and Titular Bishop of Gergis (1984–1990)

Orders
- Ordination: 28 June 1953 by José María Caro Rodríguez
- Consecration: 23 September 1984 by Juan Francisco Fresno

Personal details
- Born: 9 October 1929 Santiago, Chile
- Died: 18 April 2025 (aged 95) Santiago, Chile

Patricio Infante Alfonso (9 October 1929 – 18 April 2025) was a Chilean Roman Catholic prelate. He was auxiliary bishop of Santiago de Chile from 1984 to 1990 and archbishop of Antofagasta from 1990 to 2004. Infante Alfonso died in Santiago on 18 April 2025, at the age of 95.

Catholic Church titles
Preceded by Carlos Oviedo Cavada	Archbishop of Antagofasta; 1990–2004	Succeeded by Pablo Lizama Riquelme
Preceded by Antonio María Rouco Varela	Titular Bishop of Gergis; 1984–1990	Succeeded by Jurij Bizjak
Preceded by —	Auxiliary Bishop of Santiago de Chile; 1984–1990	Succeeded by —
