= Angelo Sodano =

Italian Roman Catholic cardinal (1927–2022)

His Eminence Angelo Sodano
- Dean of the College of Cardinals
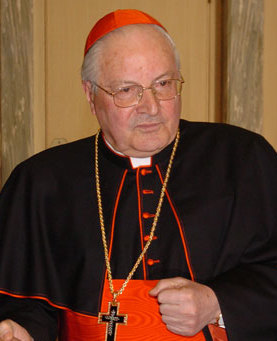
- Sodano in 2016
- Province: Diocese of Rome
- See: Albano, S. Maria Nuova (in commendam)
- Appointed: 30 April 2005
- Term ended: 21 December 2019
- Predecessor: Joseph Ratzinger
- Successor: Giovanni Battista Re
- Other posts: Cardinal-Bishop of Albano; Cardinal-Priest of Santa Maria Nuova
- Previous posts: Titular Archbishop of Nova Caesaris (1977–1991); Apostolic Nuncio to Chile (1977–1988); Secretary of the Roman Curia (1988–1989); Official of the Secretariat of State (1989–1991); Secretary of the Secretariat of State (1991–2006); Vice-Dean (Sub-Dean) of the College of Cardinals (2002–2005); Cardinal-Bishop of Ostia (2005–2019)

Orders
- Ordination: 23 September 1950 by Umberto Rossi
- Consecration: 15 January 1978 by Antonio Samorè
- Created cardinal: 28 June 1991 by Pope John Paul II
- Rank: Cardinal-Priest (1991–1994); Cardinal-Bishop (1994–2022)

Personal details
- Born: 23 November 1927 Isola d'Asti, Piedmont, Kingdom of Italy
- Died: 27 May 2022 (aged 94) Rome, Italy
- Denomination: Catholic
- Education: Pontifical Gregorian University; Pontifical Lateran University
- Motto: ut unum sint that they may be one

- Coat of arms

Styles of Angelo Sodano
- Reference style: His Eminence
- Spoken style: Your Eminence
- Informal style: Cardinal
- See: Albano (suburbicarian), S. Maria Nuova (in commendam)

Angelo Raffaele Sodano (23 November 1927 – 27 May 2022) was an Italian prelate of the Catholic Church. He served as the Dean of the College of Cardinals from 2005 to 2019 and previously as the Cardinal Secretary of State from 1991 to 2006; Sodano was the first person since 1828 to serve simultaneously as Dean and Secretary of State.

On 22 June 2006, Pope Benedict XVI accepted Sodano's resignation as Secretary of State, effective 15 September 2006. He had served in the diplomatic corps of the Holy See since 1959, including a decade as nuncio to Chile from 1978.

On 21 December 2019, it was reported that Sodano shielded sexually abusive clergy in the Legion of Christ. On the same day, Pope Francis accepted Sodano's resignation as Dean of the College of Cardinals.

== Early life ==
The second of six children, Sodano was born on 23 November 1927 in Isola d'Asti, Piedmont, to Giovanni and Delfina Sodano. His father (1901–1991) was a Christian Democrat deputy in the Italian Parliament for three terms from 1948 until 1963. After studying philosophy and theology at the seminary of Asti, Sodano was ordained a priest by Bishop Umberto Rossi on 23 September 1950, and then did pastoral work and taught dogmatic theology at the Asti seminary.

Sodano studied in Rome, obtaining a doctorate in theology from the Pontifical Gregorian University and a doctorate in canon law at the Pontifical Lateran University. To prepare for a diplomatic career, he entered the Pontifical Ecclesiastical Academy in 1959. Upon joining the diplomatic service of the Holy See, he served as secretary in nunciatures in Latin America. In 1968 he was assigned to the Council for the Public Affairs of the Church in the Vatican.

== Apostolic nuncio ==
On 30 November 1977, Sodano, who spoke English, German, Spanish, French, and Italian, was appointed titular archbishop of Nova Caesaris and apostolic nuncio to Chile, one of the countries where he had served as nunciature secretary. He was consecrated in his native Asti by Cardinal Antonio Samoré on 15 January 1978. He arrived at a difficult moment, with Chile on the brink of war with Argentina over the Beagle Channel and Augusto Pinochet in power. In 1980, together with Cardinal Raúl Silva Henríquez, he tried without success to get Pinochet to allow the return of certain political exiles, and in 1984 he obtained, at the cost of a dispute between the Holy See and the military government of Chile, safe conduct for four members of the Revolutionary Left Movement, who had sought diplomatic asylum in the nunciature, to leave for Ecuador.

In 1987, when Pope John Paul II visited Chile, Sodano arranged for him to meet in the nunciature the leaders of the opposition to the Pinochet government. The following year, the Pope appointed Sodano Secretary for Relations with States, a post corresponding to that of a foreign minister, and on 1 December 1990 named him Pro-Secretary of State, creating him Cardinal-Priest of S. Maria Nuova on 28 June 1991.

== Secretary of State ==
On 29 June 1991, Sodano became Cardinal Secretary of State, succeeding Cardinal Agostino Casaroli, who had retired on 1 December 1990. On 10 January 1994, Pope John Paul II named Sodano Cardinal Bishop of the suburbicarian see of Albano. Sodano retained his relationship to the church of Santa Maria Nuova no longer as titular but in commendam, that is, in trust or his custody.

On 27 December 1998, Sodano wrote, at the request of the democratic government of Chile, an official letter to the British Prime Minister Tony Blair stating that "the Chilean Government considers it an offense to its territorial sovereignty as a nation the fact of being deprived of the power to judge its citizens" through the detention of Pinochet in Britain. When in 2002 he turned 75, John Paul invited him to stay on as Secretary of State, though this is the customary retirement age for heads of major Vatican departments. On 30 November 2002, exactly twenty-five years after he was first appointed a bishop, he was elected vice-dean of the College of Cardinals, succeeding Cardinal Joseph Ratzinger, who became dean. In 2003, as the pope's legate to the celebration of the 500th anniversary of the election of the Renaissance Pope Julius II, he praised him for his vigorous defense of the Holy See in an age when its temporal role was still critical.

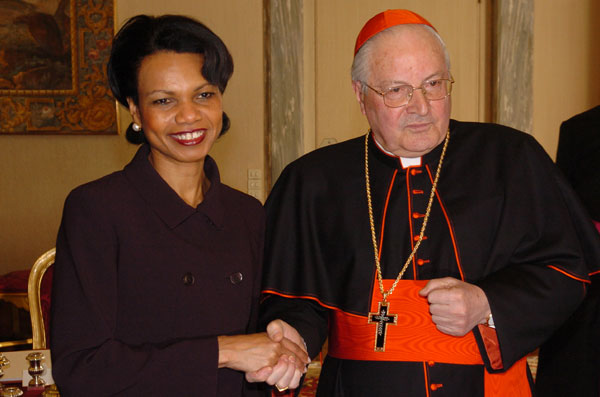
Sodano with Condoleezza Rice, U.S. Secretary of State, in 2005

Sodano participated as an elector in the 2005 papal conclave that elected Pope Benedict XVI. He was not generally considered a likely candidate himself, though he reportedly received a few votes. During the conclave, because Cardinal Ratzinger, the pope-elect, was the dean, Sodano as the sub-dean exercised the dean's duties, asking the pope-elect if he accepted his election and by what name he would be called. At the papal inauguration, Sodano presented Pope Benedict XVI with the Ring of the Fisherman, and he was one of those who made the public profession of obedience to the new pope.

Sodano's position as Secretary of State expired upon the death of John Paul II. Benedict XVI reappointed him to the position on 21 April 2005, even though he was past the customary retirement age. On 30 April Benedict ratified Sodano's election to the position of Dean of the College of Cardinals by the suburbicarian cardinal bishops, adding as was customary the suburbicarian see of Ostia to his honorary titles.

On 22 June 2006, Benedict XVI accepted Sodano's resignation as Secretary of State, effective 15 September 2006. On 18 September 2012, Sodano was named by Pope Benedict as one of the Synod Fathers of the 13th Ordinary General Assembly of the Catholic Synod of Bishops. When Pope Benedict resigned, Sodano as Dean of the College of Cardinals summoned the cardinals for the conclave during the sede vacante and was the principal concelebrant of the Pro eligendo Pontifice mass on the morning the conclave opened. He was not eligible to participate in the conclave, which elected Pope Francis. At the inauguration of the new pope, Sodano, as Dean of the college, presented the Ring of the Fisherman to Francis.

On 21 December 2019, Pope Francis accepted Sodano's resignation as Dean of the College of Cardinals, following the Pope's annual Christmas meeting with officials of the Curia which opens with a greeting by the Dean.

== Sex abuse cases ==
Former Irish minister for foreign affairs Dermot Ahern revealed in 2018 that Sodano pressured him in 2004 to "indemnify the Catholic Church against legal actions for compensation by clerical child sexual abuse survivors" in Ireland, which Ahern refused.

Jason Berry writes that Sodano, as John Paul II's secretary of state, "pressured Cardinal Joseph Ratzinger, then the head of Congregation for the Doctrine of the Faith and who would become Pope Benedict, to stop investigations into two notorious sex abuse cases," the Hans Hermann Groër case and the Marcial Maciel case. In his address as Dean of the College of Cardinals to Pope Benedict XVI at Easter 2010, Sodano told him: "The people of God are with you and do not allow themselves to be impressed by the petty gossip of the moment, by the trials that sometimes assail the community of believers." Victims of clerical sex abuse interpreted the "petty gossip" remark as a highly inappropriate reference to their complaints, emphasizing that victims seeking healing "should not be insulted and told that our speaking out is petty gossip.”

On 8 May 2010, the Austrian Catholic news agency Kathpress published remarks made by Cardinal Christoph Schönborn, in what was supposed to be a private conversation with newspaper editors. The Austrian cardinal criticized Sodano's "petty gossip" comment and indicated that Sodano had blocked the actions of then-Cardinal Ratzinger, who was serving as head of the Congregation for the Doctrine of the Faith, and was intending to investigate accusations against Schönborn's predecessor Cardinal Hans Hermann Groër. Schönborn added: "The days of cover-up are over. For a long while the Church's principle of forgiveness was falsely interpreted and was in favour of those responsible and not the victims."

Sodano is one of many Catholic bishops and cardinals who are accused in an August 2018 letter by former Apostolic Nuncio to the United States Archbishop Carlo Maria Viganò of failing to act on reports of sexual misconduct by former cardinal Theodore McCarrick. According to Viganò, his predecessors in the nuncio position attempted to warn the Holy See about McCarrick, but McCarrick was shielded from discipline by a series of secretaries of state, including Sodano.

On 21 December 2019, the Legion of Christ identified 33 of its priests and 71 of its seminarians as sexually abusing 175 children for decades and singled out Sodano as the leader of efforts to cover up the reports of abuse when he was serving as Secretary of State. Sodano was accused of seeking a deal to bury documents detailing abuse. A third of the sex abuse cases that Sodano was accused of covering up involved Legion of Christ founder and notorious predator priest Marcial Maciel. The same day, Pope Francis accepted Sodano's resignation as Dean of the College of Cardinals. The Holy See Press Office announcement of his resignation provided no reason for it.

== Death ==
Sodano died of complications from COVID-19 and pneumonia on 27 May 2022, at the age of 94. Pope Francis paid tribute to Sodano, "I recall his diligent work alongside so many of my predecessors, who entrusted him with important responsibilities in Vatican diplomacy, up to the delicate office of Secretary of State. In the Roman Curia, he carried out his mission with exemplary dedication. I, too, was able to benefit from his gifts of mind and heart, especially when he exercised the office of Dean of the College of Cardinals. In every assignment, he showed himself to be an ecclesial disciplined man, an amiable pastor, animated by a desire to spread the leaven of the Gospel everywhere."

By his wishes, Sodano was interred in the crypt of the cathedral in Asti.

== Awards ==
- International Vittorino Colombo Prize, 2004.

Diplomatic posts
Preceded by Sotero Sanz Villalba	Apostolic Nuncio to Chile; 30 November 1977 – 23 May 1988	Succeeded by Giulio Einaudi
Political offices
Preceded by Achille Silvestrini	Secretary for Relations with States; 1 March 1989 – 1 December 1990	Succeeded by Jean-Louis Tauran
Preceded by Agostino Casaroli	Cardinal Secretary of State; 29 June 1991 – 15 September 2006	Succeeded by Tarcisio Bertone
Catholic Church titles
Preceded by Gerardo Humberto Flores Reyes	— TITULAR — Titular Archbishop of Nova Cæsaris; 30 November 1977 – 28 June 1991	Succeeded by Rino Passigato
Preceded by Emmanuel Kiwanuka Nsubuga	Cardinal Priest of Santa Maria Nova; 28 June 1991 – 27 May 2022	Succeeded by Péter Erdő
New creation	President of the Interdicasterial Commission on Particular Churches; 29 June 1991 – 15 September 2006	Succeeded by Tarcisio Bertone
New creation	President of the Interdicasterial Commission for the Church in Eastern Europe; 29 June 1991 – 15 September 2006	Succeeded by Tarcisio Bertone
Preceded by Agostino Casaroli	Cardinal Protector of the Pontifical Ecclesiastical Academy; 29 June 1991 – 15 September 2006	Succeeded by Tarcisio Bertone
Preceded by Francesco Carpino	Cardinal Bishop of Albano; 10 January 1994 – 27 May 2022	Succeeded by Robert Francis Prevost
Preceded by Joseph Aloisius Ratzinger	Vice-Dean of the College of Cardinals; 30 November 2002 – 30 April 2005	Succeeded by Roger Etchegaray
Preceded by Joseph Aloisius Ratzinger	Cardinal Bishop of Ostia; 30 April 2005 – 21 December 2019	Succeeded by Giovanni Battista Re
Preceded by Joseph Aloisius Ratzinger	Dean of the College of Cardinals; 30 April 2005 – 21 December 2019	Succeeded by Giovanni Battista Re
