= Van Vlierberghe =

Van Vlierberghe is a surname that is mainly found in Belgium. Notable people with the surname include:

- Albert Van Vlierberghe (1942–1991), Belgian road bicycle racer
- Frans Van Vlierberghe (1954–2026), Belgian racing cyclist
- Polidoro Van Vlierberghe (1909–2006), Belgian Franciscan priest and Roman Catholic bishop
