= Roman Catholic Archdiocese of Antofagasta =

Catholic ecclesiastical territory

Coordinates: 23.6469°S 70.3976°W

Archdiocese of Antofagasta Archidioecesis Antofagastensis Arquidiócesis de Antofagasta

Catholic
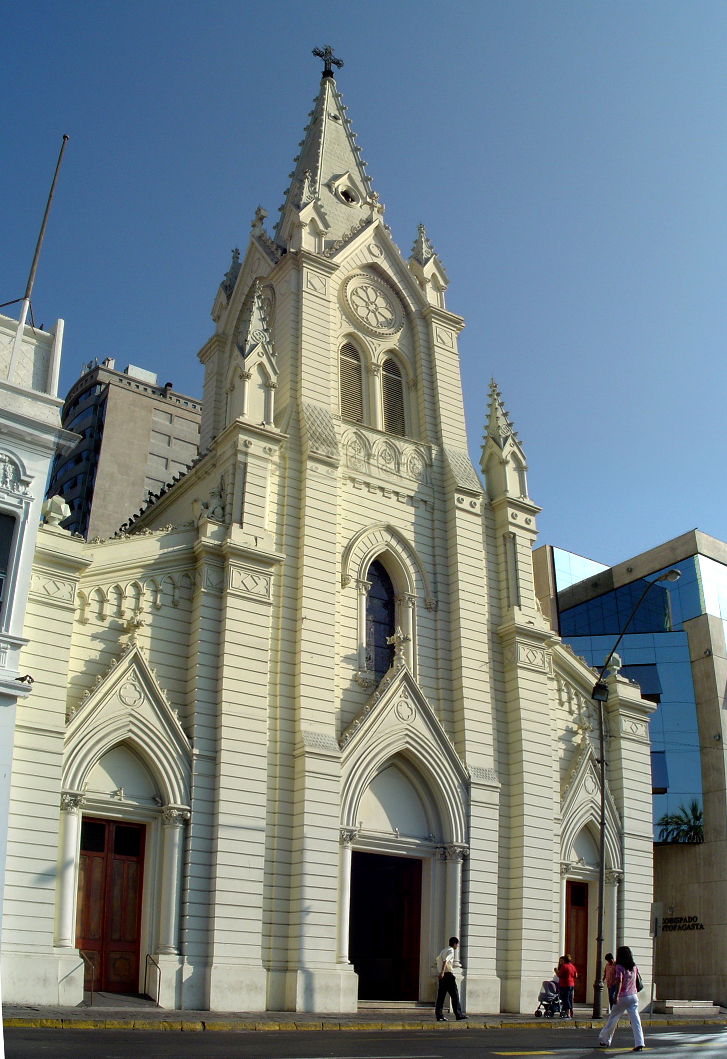
- Cathedral of St. Joseph

Location
- Country: Chile
- Ecclesiastical province: Antofagasta

Statistics
- Area: 84,506 km^{2} (32,628 sq mi)
- Population: Total; Catholics: (as of 2012); 362,000; 252,300 (69.7%)
- Parishes: 19

Information
- Rite: Latin Rite
- Established: 1881 (144–145 years ago)
- Cathedral: Cathedral of St Joseph in Antofagasta
- Patron saint: Saint Joseph

Current leadership
- Pope: Leo XIV
- Metropolitan Archbishop: Ignacio Francisco Ducasse Medina
- Bishops emeritus: Pablo Lizama Riquelme

Map

Website
- www.iglesiadeantofagasta.cl

The Roman Catholic Archdiocese of Antofagasta (Latin: Antofagasten(sis)) is a Latin Rite Metropolitan archdiocese in northern Chile's Antofagasta Province.

== Special churches ==
- Its cathedral archiepiscopal see is Catedral San José, dedicated to Saint Joseph, in the city of Antofagasta.
- It also has a Minor Basilica : Basílica del Corazón de María

== History ==
- 1881: Established as Mission “sui iuris” of Antofagasta, on territory split off from the Diocese of La Serena (now Metropolitan)
- 1887: Promoted as Apostolic Vicariate of Antofagasta
- 3 February 1928: Promoted as Diocese of Antofagasta
- 1965.07.21: Lost territory to establish Territorial Prelature of Calama (now suffragan Diocese of San Juan de Calama)
- 28 June 1967: Promoted as Metropolitan Archdiocese of Antofagasta/ Antofagasten(sis) (Latin adjective)
- Enjoyed a Papal visit from Pope John Paul II in April 1987.

== Statistics ==
As per 2014, it pastorally served 386,017 Catholics (70.2% of 550,256 total) on 84,504 km^{2} in 20 parishes and 67 missions with 37 priests (18 diocesan, 19 religious), 28 deacons, 108 lay religious (24 brothers, 84 sisters) and 2 seminarians.

== Ecclesiastical province ==
The Metropolitan's Suffragan sees are :

- Roman Catholic Diocese of Iquique
- Roman Catholic Diocese of San Juan Bautista de Calama, its daughter see
- Roman Catholic Diocese of San Marcos de Arica

== Bishops ==
(all Roman rite Chileans)

=== Ordinaries ===
Ecclesiastical Superior of Antofagasta

- Father Florencio Eduardo Fontecilla Sánchez (1883 – 1886.12.23), next Bishop of mother see La Serena (Chile) (1890.06.26 – death 1909.03.03)

Apostolic Vicars of Antofagasta

- Bishop-elect Luís Silva Lezaeta first term (1887.05.15 – 1896)
- Fr. Felipe Salas Errázuriz (1896.03.04 – 1905)
- Luís Silva Lezaeta again (1904.11.04 – 1928.02.03 see below), Titular Bishop of Olena (1912.01.05 – 1928.02.03)

Suffragan Bishops of Antofagasta

- Luís Silva Lezaeta (see above 1928.02.03 – death 1929.05.21)
- Alfredo Cifuentes Gómez (1933.12.23 – 1943.06.05), next Metropolitan Archbishop of La Serena (Chile) (1943.06.05 – 1967.03.10), Apostolic Administrator ad nutum Sanctae Sedis of Apostolic Administration of Copiapó (Chile) (1947.03.19 – 1948.06.17), emeritate as Titular Archbishop of Thapsus (1967.03.10 – retired 1970.12.02), died 1989

BIOs TO ELABORATE

- Hernán Frías Hurtado (1945.01.13 – 1957.05.24)
- Francisco de Borja Valenzuela Ríos (1957.08.20 – 1967.06.28 see below)

Metropolitan Archbishops of Antofagasta

- Francisco de Borja Valenzuela Ríos (see above 1967.06.28 – 1974.03.25), next Archbishop (personal title) of San Felipe (1974.03.25 - 1993.04.16)
- Carlos Oviedo Cavada, O. de M. (1974.03.25 – 1990.03.30), next Metropolitan Archbishop of Santiago de Chile (1990.03.30 - 1998.02.16), elevated to Cardinal in 1994; died 7 December 1998
- Patricio Infante Alfonso (1990.12.12 – 2004.11.26)
- Pablo Lizama Riquelme (2004.11.26 – 8 June 2017)
- Ignacio Francisco Ducasse Medina (8 June 2017 – ...)

=== Coadjutor bishop ===
- Pablo Lizama Riquelme (2004)

=== Auxiliary bishops ===
- Arturo Mery Beckdorf (1941-1944, Apostolic Administrator 1943–1944), appointed Bishop of Valdivia
- Juan Luis Ysern de Arce (1972-1974), appointed Bishop of San Carlos de Ancud
- Juan Bautista Herrada Armijo, O. de M. (1991-1997)

== See also ==
- List of Catholic dioceses in Chile

== Sources and external links ==
- GCatholic.org
- Diocese website
- Herbermann, Charles, ed. (1913). "Vicariate Apostolic of Antofogaste" . Catholic Encyclopedia. New York: Robert Appleton Company.
- Catholic Hierarchy
