= Diocese of Teurnia =

Roman Catholic titular see

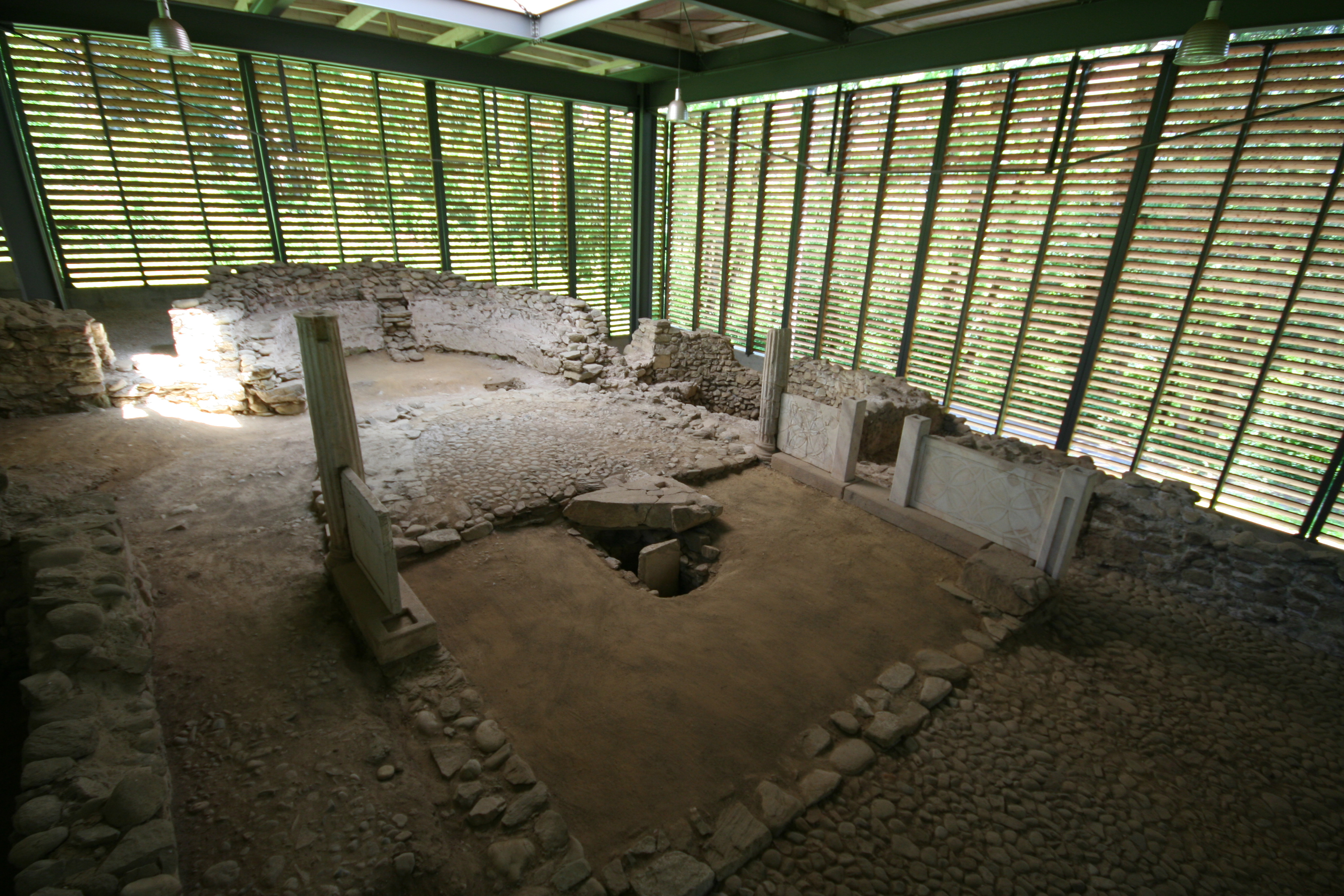
Bishop's church in Teurnia.

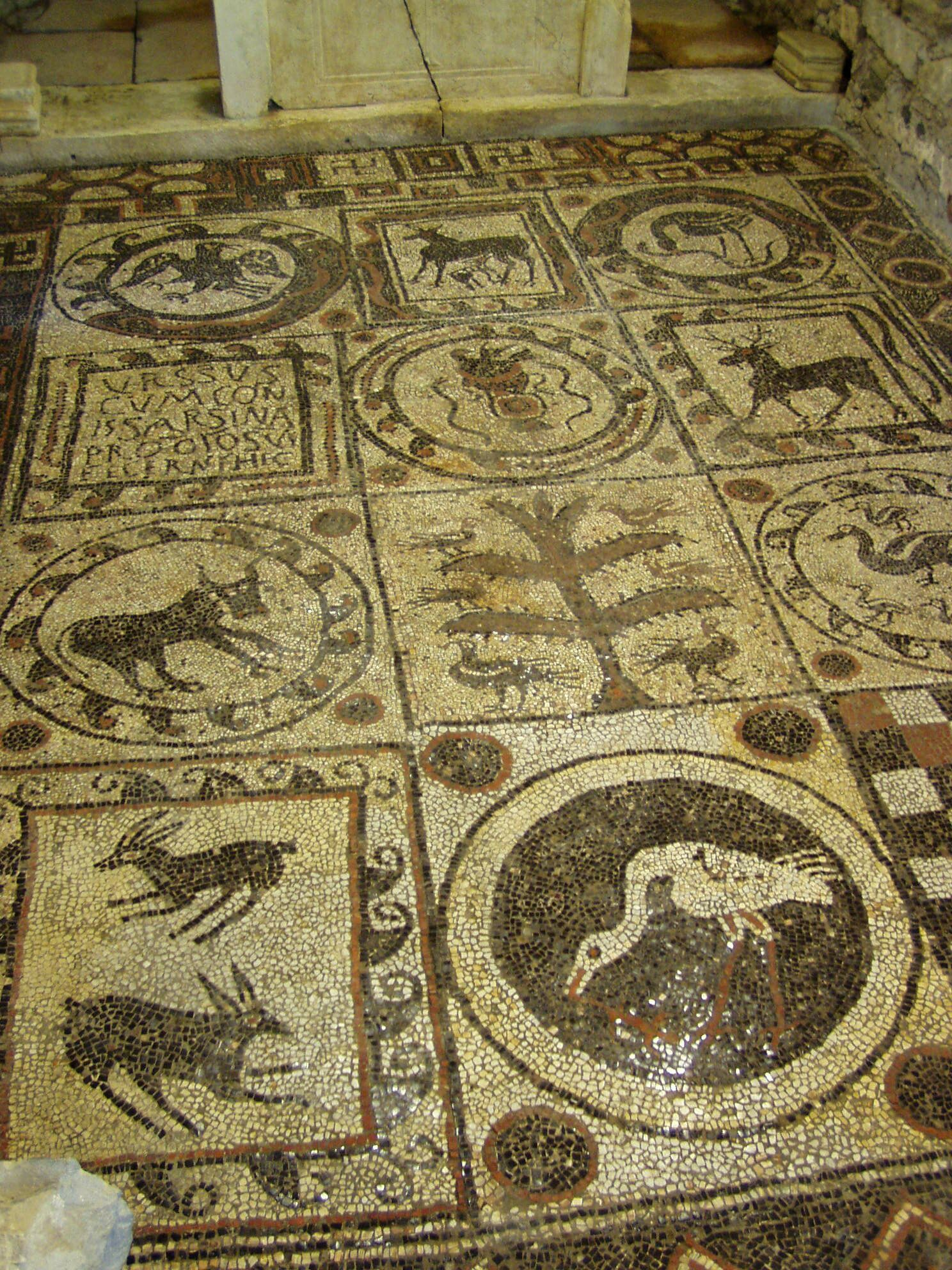
Mosaic in the "Cemetery Church", discovered 1908

The diocese of Teurnia (or Tiburnia) was a Chalcedonian Christian church in the Roman province of Noricum during the 5th through 7th centuries. It is today a titular see in the Catholic Church.

== Ancient diocese ==
There was a Christian population in Teurnia by the 4th century. Several Norican bishops—not identified by see—attended the council of Serdica in 343. They were of the Chalcedonian persuasion and subject to the ecclesiastical province of Aquileia. The first identifiable church, the Friedhofskirche, was built shortly after 400. Another church was built in the refuge castle, and the whole diocese of Teurnia was dotted with such castles.

A bishopric existed at Teurnia at least from the time of Severinus of Noricum (active in Noricum in 460–482), as attested in Eugippius's Vita sancti Severini (511). The cathedral was probably the church on the Holzerberg. There are numerous references to bishops of Teurnia from the 6th century. It is unclear if the bishop of Teurnia was the metropolitan archbishop of the province of Noricum Mediterraneum, of which Teurnia was the metropolis, or even if he was the metropolitan of both Noricums.

In 473, Severinus warned the bishop of Teurnia, Paulinus, of a coming barbarian attack, allowing the bishop to organize the defence of his city. Around 540, Teurnia was under Frankish control and a Frankish bishop was appointing priests there. The last mention of the city and diocese of Teurnia is from 591 in a letter of the Venetic and Rhaetic bishops.

Residential bishops of Teurnia

(incomplete)

- Paulinus (473)
- Leonianus (579?)

== Titular see ==
In 1968, the archdiocese was nominally restored as metropolitan titular archbishopric of Tiburnia (in both Latin and Curiate Italian).

It has had the following incumbents, most of archiepiscopal rank, with episcopal exception:

- Emilio Benavent Escuín, Titular Archbishop of Tiburnia, 26 August 1968 – 3 February 1974 as Coadjutor Archbishop of Granada (Spain) (1968.08.26 – 1974.02.03); later succeeded as Metropolitan Archbishop of Granada (1974.02.03 – 1977.05.25), then Titular Archbishop of Maximiana in Numidia (1977.05.25 – 1998.03.07) as Archbishop of Military Vicariate of Spain) (1977.05.25 – retired 1982.10.27) and on emeritate; died 2008; previously Titular Bishop of Cercina (1954.12.06 – 1967.04.07) as Auxiliary Bishop of Málaga (Balearic Spain) (1954.12.06 – 1967.04.07), succeeded as Bishop of Málaga (1967.04.07 – 1968.08.26)
- Donato Squicciarini, Titular Archbishop of Tiburnia 31 August 1978 – 5 March 2006 as papal diplomat : Apostolic Nuncio (ambassador) to Burundi (1978.08.31 – 1981.09.16), Apostolic Delegate (envoy) to Equatorial Guinea (1981.09.16 – 1982), Apostolic Pro-Nuncio to Cameroon (1981.09.16 – 1989.07.01), Apostolic Pro-Nuncio to Gabon (1981.09.16 – 1989.07.01), Apostolic Pro-Nuncio to Equatorial Guinea (1982 – 1989.07.01), Permanent Observer (multilateral organisation ambassador) to Office of the United Nations and Specialized Institutions in Vienna (UNOV) (1989 – 1994), Permanent Observer to United Nations Industrial Development Organization (UNIDO) (1989 – 1994), Permanent Representative to International Atomic Energy Agency (IAEA) (1989 – 1994), Apostolic Nuncio to Austria (1989.07.01 – retired 2002.10.08), died 2006
- Víctor René Rodríguez Gómez, Titular Bishop of Tiburnia 13 May 2006 – 25 October 2012; born 17 November 1950 in San Martín de las Pirámides; appointed Titular Bishop of Tiburnia as Auxiliary Bishop of Texcoco (Mexico), 13 May 2006 - 25 October 2012; ordained Bishop of Tiburnia 25 July 2006; succeeded as Bishop Valle de Chalco (25 October 2012 - ...) .
- Víctor Manuel Fernández, Titular Archbishop of Tiburnia from 13 May 2013 to 16 June 2018 (one of the first nominations of Pope Francis), already President of the Pontifical Catholic University of Argentina (December 2009.12 – 2018.04.25). Appointed Archbishop of La Plata in 2018, Cardinal-Deacon of Santi Urbano e Lorenzo a Prima Porta and Prefect of the Dicastery for the Doctrine of the Faith in 2023.
- Andrés Gabriel Ferrada Moreira, Titular Archbishop of Tiburnia from 8 September 2021 to 31 October 2025, while serving as Secretary of the Dicastery for the Clergy. Appointed Bishop of San Bartolomé de Chillán in 2025.
- Grzegorz Piotr Bielaszka, Titular Archbishop of Tiburnia from 5 October 2026. Appointed Nuncio to United Arab Emirates.
