= Francisco José Cox =

Chilean Catholic archbishop (1933–2020)

- Church: Roman Catholic Church
- Archdiocese: Archdiocese of La Serena
- In office: 1990 to 1997
- Predecessor: Manuel Gerardo Donoso
- Successor: Bernardino Piñera

Orders
- Ordination: 16 July 1961
- Consecration: 2 March 1975
- Laicized: 11 October 2018

Personal details
- Born: Francisco José Cox Huneeus; 18 December 1933
- Died: 12 August 2020 (aged 86)
- Denomination: Catholicism

Francisco José Cox Huneeus (18 December 1933 – 12 August 2020) was a native of Chile and a former archbishop of the Catholic Church. He was a member of the Schoenstatt Movement. He was Bishop of Chillán from 1975 to 1981 and Coadjutor Archbishop of La Serena from 1985 to 1990 and Archbishop there from 1990 to 1997, when he resigned following accusations that he had sexually abused young boys. He was laïcized in 2018.

== Biography ==
Cox Huneeus was born in Santiago de Chile on 18 December 1933. He was ordained a priest on 16 July 1961. On 14 December 1974 he was named Bishop of Chillán, and he received his episcopal consecration on 2 March 1975.

He was appointed Secretary of the Pontifical Council for the Family in Rome on 4 August 1981 and left his position in Chillán on 9 November. On 22 January 1985 Pope John Paul II named him Coadjutor Archbishop of La Serena, and on 29 September 1990 he became archbishop.

In 1992, Manuel Hervia, a priest of that diocese, reported to Bishops Alejandro Goic Karmelic and Carlos González Cruchaga, president of the Chilean Episcopal Conference, that Cox had abused boys in La Serena. When three years passed without an investigation being launched, Hervia informed Archbishop Carlos Oviedo Cavada of Santiago de Chile. He was hoping his reports would reach the Apostolic Nuncio and lead the Vatican to launch an investigation. The bishops told him the Schönstatt community was aware of the issue and counseled patience.

Pope John Paul II accepted his resignation as Archbishop of La Serena on 16 April 1997. Mental health issues were said to explain the resignation long before the usual age of 75. From 1997 to 2002 he performed administrative assignments in Rome and in Colombia, and then left Chile permanently to live at the Schönstatt community's central headquarters in Germany at the request of the Congregation for Bishops. There he worked on translations. Years later, in 2018, the Schönstatt Fathers said they had failed to respond to the evidence of Cox's abuse when he left La Serena.

In 2002, when he learned that two newspapers, La Nación and La Tercera, were about to report the facts surrounding Cox's resignation, Cardinal Francisco Javier Errázuriz Ossa of Santiago de Chile revealed that Cox had resigned voluntarily because of charges of sexual abuse. He said that "His affection and expressiveness awoke suspicions and interpretations around him that made it very difficult for him to continue his work in La Serena", and that he had been unable to alter his style of behavior even when advised to do so by friends and superiors. He said Cox expressed "somewhat exuberant affection" to everyone, though he allowed it was "more surprising with respect to children". He said that the charges against Cox were unproven. He said the legal system should be allowed to run its course. Cox's successor, Archbishop Manuel Donoso, said he had received several complaints, which he considered unverifiable, and that everyone could see that Cox was "perhaps excessively affectionate". He said:

I would like to tell the people of La Serena that some feel hurt, others surprised that we close ranks around Christ. Pastors are weak, we are people, and we have many difficulties. Humbly, if someone has done wrong, I also apologize in the name of the Church.

In Colombia, where he was working for the Episcopal Conference of Latin America, Cox issued a statement that said: "I apologize for the dark side of me that opposes the Gospel."

In June 2018, Abel Soto notified the Vatican officials reviewing the Chilean Church's sexual abuse record that he had suffered abuse from Cox, both as a child in Chillán and as a university student in La Serena. He implicated as well Cox's predecessor in La Serena, Archbishop Bernardino Piñera Carvallo, for tolerating Cox's behavior. He provided civil authorities with the same information in August, and three other accusers added their testimony around the same time.

On 11 October 2018 Pope Francis laicized Cox. He was no longer a priest and could not appeal that decision. He remained a member of the Schönstatt community, whose leaders announced they were ordering a medical evaluation to determine if Cox was fit to return to Chile for legal proceedings. He was reported to be suffering from senile dementia and requiring nursing care.

Cox was the subject of a criminal investigation in Germany with respect to abuse of a minor alleged to have occurred there in 2004, based on a complaint made to the Schönstatt Fathers in late 2017 and referred by them to German authorities and the Congregation for the Doctrine of the Faith.

On August 12, 2020 Cox died of respiratory failure and multisystemic failure. At the time of his death, Cox was awaiting trial and was forced to return to Chile from Germany, where he lived between 2002 and 2019. Cox was also buried the same day with all four of his brothers present.

== See also ==
- Catholic sexual abuse cases in Chile

Catholic Church titles
Preceded by Eladio Vicuña Aránguiz	Bishop of Chillán; 1975 – 1981	Succeeded by Alberto Jara Franzoy
	Secretary of the Pontifical Council for the Family; 1980 – 1985	
New title	Archbishop Coadjutor of La Serena; 1985 – 1990	
Preceded by Bernardino Piñera Carvallo	Archbishop of La Serena; 1990 – 1997	Succeeded by Manuel Donoso
