= Manuel Donoso =

Chilean Roman Catholic bishop (1936–2026)

The Most Reverend Manuel Donoso SS.CC.
- Archbishop of La Serena
- Church: Catholic Church
- Archdiocese: La Serena
- Appointed: 16 April 1997
- Installed: 4 May 1997
- Term ended: 14 December 2013
- Predecessor: Francisco José Cox Huneeus
- Successor: René Rebolledo Salinas
- Previous posts: Auxiliary Bishop of La Serena and Titular Bishop of Elo (1996–1997)

Orders
- Ordination: 23 September 1961 by Emilio Tagle Covarrubias
- Consecration: 10 August 1996 by Carlos Oviedo Cavada, Francisco José Cox and Francisco Javier Prado Aránguiz

Personal details
- Born: Manuel Gerardo Donoso Donoso; 16 October 1936 Santiago, Chile
- Died: 29 October 2026 (aged 90) Santiago, Chile
- Education: Pontifical Catholic University of Chile, Institut Catholique de Paris
- Motto: He admirado tu obra

Manuel Gerardo Donoso Donoso SS.CC. (16 October 1936 – 29 October 2026) was a Chilean Roman Catholic prelate who served as Archbishop of La Serena from 1997 until his retirement in 2013. Previously he was as an auxiliary bishop of La Serena from 1996 to 1997.

== Early life and education ==
Donoso was born in Santiago, Chile, on 16 October 1936, to Manuel Donoso Montt and Teresa Donoso Carrasco. He completed his humanities studies at the Colegio de los Sagrados Corazones in Santiago and subsequently studied law for several years at the Pontifical Catholic University of Chile. He later entered the Congregation of the Sacred Hearts of Jesus and Mary, making his perpetual profession in 1958.

He studied theology at the Pontifical Catholic University of Chile, obtaining a licentiate in theology, and subsequently specialised in moral theology at the Institut Catholique de Paris in France.

== Priesthood ==
Donoso was ordained a priest on 23 September 1961 at the Cathedral of Valparaíso by Emilio Tagle Covarrubias, then Bishop of Valparaíso.

Following his ordination, he served in the ministry of the Congregation of the Sacred Hearts. His work included pastoral service, religious formation and educational activities.

== Episcopate ==
=== Auxiliary Bishop of La Serena ===
On 16 June 1996, Pope John Paul II appointed Donoso auxiliary bishop of La Serena. He was also appointed titular bishop of Elo. He received episcopal consecration on 10 August 1996 at the cathedral in Santiago. His episcopal motto was He admirado tu obra (Spanish for "I have admired your work").

=== Archbishop of La Serena ===
On 16 April 1997, Donoso was appointed Archbishop of La Serena, succeeding Francisco José Cox Huneeus. He took possession of the archdiocese on 4 May 1997.

During his episcopate, Donoso led the archdiocese's pastoral activities across the Coquimbo Region of Chile. One of the initiatives associated with his tenure was the establishment of Radio San Bartolomé on 24 August 2001, together with a network of radio stations intended to extend the reach of the Church's communications and evangelisation activities.

In July 2007, he published the pastoral letter Por fidelidad a Jesús, que quiere que todos tengamos vida en abundancia ("Out of fidelity to Jesus, who wants us all to have life in abundance"), addressing poverty and the responsibility of society to improve the circumstances of disadvantaged people.

Donoso also supported the restoration of religious buildings damaged in the 1997 earthquake. Among the projects highlighted during his episcopate was the restoration of the Temple of the Niño Dios de Sotaquí, which had been unusable for 15 years. The restored building was received on 16 August 2013 and was declared a sanctuary in January 2014.

His public recognition included the Medalla Ciudad de La Serena, awarded on 26 August 2012, and a distinction from the Municipality of Monte Patria in September 2014 in recognition of his engagement with local communities and social concerns.

=== Resignation, later ministry and death ===
On 14 December 2013, Pope Francis accepted Donoso's resignation from the pastoral governance of the Archdiocese of La Serena in accordance with canon 401 §1 of the Code of Canon Law. The Vatican announcement named René Rebolledo Salinas, then Bishop of Osorno, as his successor.

Following his resignation, Donoso continued to serve as apostolic administrator of La Serena until 8 March 2014.

After leaving the archdiocese's administration, he lived in Coquimbo, where he continued pastoral work with people in prison and collaborated with the Casa de la Esperanza foundation. On 16 August 2019, he left La Serena to live with his sister in Viña del Mar. Later, because of health difficulties, he moved to the provincial residence of the Congregation of the Sacred Hearts in Santiago.

Donoso died in Santiago on 29 October 2026, at the age of 90. His death was announced by the Congregation of the Sacred Hearts and reported by the Archdiocese of La Serena, which expressed condolences to his family and religious community.

Catholic Church titles
Preceded by Francisco José Cox Huneeus	Archbishop of La Serena; 1997–2013	Succeeded by René Rebolledo Salinas
Preceded by Carmelo Borobia	Titular Bishop of Elo; 1996–1997	Succeeded by Luis Armando Collazuol
Preceded by —	Auxiliary Bishop of La Serena; 1996–1997	Succeeded by —
