= Juan Luis Ysern de Arce =

Spanish-born Chilean Roman Catholic prelate (born 1930)

The Most Reverend Juan Luis Ysern de Arce
- Bishop Emeritus of San Carlos de Ancud
- Church: Roman Catholic Church
- Diocese: Roman Catholic Diocese of San Carlos de Ancud
- Appointed: 13 May 1974
- Term ended: 15 September 2005
- Predecessor: Sergio Otoniel Contreras Navia
- Successor: Juan María Florindo Agurto Muñoz

Orders
- Ordination: 29 June 1953 by Jacinto Argaya Goicoechea
- Consecration: 7 May 1972 by Eladio Vicuña Aránguiz

Personal details
- Born: 2 May 1930 (age 96) Valencia, Spain
- Education: University of Salamanca

Juan Luis Ysern de Arce (born 2 May 1930) is a Spanish-born Chilean Roman Catholic prelate who served as Bishop of San Carlos de Ancud in Chile from 1974 until 2005. Following his retirement, he holds the title of Bishop Emeritus of Ancud. He is known for his long episcopal leadership in the Chiloé Archipelago, his advocacy for human rights during the Chilean military dictatorship, and his later public interventions concerning episcopal accountability within the Catholic Church.

== Early life and education ==
Juan Luis Ysern de Arce was born in the city of Valencia in eastern Spain on 2 May 1930. He pursued ecclesiastical studies in Spain and obtained a licentiate in Canon Law from the University of Salamanca. He was ordained to the priesthood on 29 June 1953 for the Archdiocese of Granada.

== Priestly ministry ==
After his ordination, Ysern de Arce carried out parish and diocesan ministry in Spain before relocating permanently to Chile. He became incardinated in the Diocese of Chillán, where he served as parish vicar and later held several administrative and judicial offices, including chancellor, judicial vicar, and vicar general. His background in canon law and diocesan governance brought him prominence within the Chilean episcopate.

== Episcopal ministry ==
=== Auxiliary Bishop of Antofagasta ===
On 12 April 1972, Pope Paul VI appointed Ysern de Arce as Auxiliary Bishop of Antofagasta and Titular Bishop of Guardialfiera. He received episcopal consecration on 7 May 1972 in Chillán from Bishop Eladio Vicuña Aránguiz.

Following his consecration, he also served as Apostolic Administrator of Calama, overseeing pastoral governance in a region marked by rapid demographic growth related to the Chilean mining industry.

=== Bishop of San Carlos de Ancud ===
On 13 May 1974, Ysern de Arce was appointed Bishop of the Diocese of San Carlos de Ancud, which encompasses the Chiloé Archipelago and surrounding territories in southern Chile. He was installed on 15 June 1974 and governed the diocese for more than three decades.

His episcopate coincided with the period of the Chilean military dictatorship under Augusto Pinochet. During this time, Ysern de Arce was associated with Church initiatives aimed at defending human dignity and assisting victims of political repression, aligning with broader efforts of the Catholic Church in Chile to address human rights abuses.

He also emphasized pastoral outreach to isolated island communities and promoted the preservation of the region’s religious and cultural heritage. Under his leadership, attention was drawn to the historic wooden churches of Chiloé, several of which were later recognized as World Heritage Sites by UNESCO.

== Retirement ==
In accordance with canon law, Ysern de Arce submitted his resignation upon reaching the age of 75. His resignation was accepted by Pope Benedict XVI on 15 September 2005, after which he assumed the title of Bishop Emeritus of Ancud.

== Later activity and public positions ==
After his retirement, Ysern de Arce remained active in ecclesiastical life, serving on church tribunals and continuing to publish reflections on pastoral leadership and episcopal responsibility. In 2015, he attracted national attention after addressing an open letter to Bishop Juan Barros Madrid, urging him to resign amid controversy related to clerical sexual abuse cases. The letter was widely cited in Chilean media and ecclesial debates as an example of internal criticism grounded in pastoral concern.

== Recognition and legacy ==
Ysern de Arce has received recognition for his contributions to human rights, cultural preservation, and pastoral service in Chile. On the occasion of the fiftieth anniversary of his episcopal consecration in 2022, various Catholic organizations highlighted his commitment to ethical leadership and social responsibility within the Church.
