= Alberto Jara Franzoy =

Chilean Roman Catholic bishop (1929–2019)

- Bishop of Chillán
- Church: Catholic Church
- Diocese: Diocese of Chillán
- In office: 30 April 1982 – 25 March 2006
- Predecessor: Francisco José Cox
- Successor: Carlos Pellegrín

Orders
- Ordination: 4 March 1962 by Raúl Silva Henríquez
- Consecration: 6 June 1982 by Raúl Silva Henríquez

Personal details
- Born: 27 July 1929 Santiago, Chile
- Died: 5 September 2019 (aged 90) Santiago, Chile

Alberto Jara Franzoy (27 July 1929 – 5 September 2019) was a Chilean Roman Catholic bishop.

Jara Franzoy was born in Chile and was ordained to the priesthood in 1962. He served as bishop of the Roman Catholic Diocese of Chillán, Chile, from 1982 to 2006.
