= Andrés Gabriel Ferrada Moreira =

Archbishop

The Most Reverend Andrés Gabriel Ferrada Moreira
- Archbishop-Bishop of San Bartolomé de Chillán
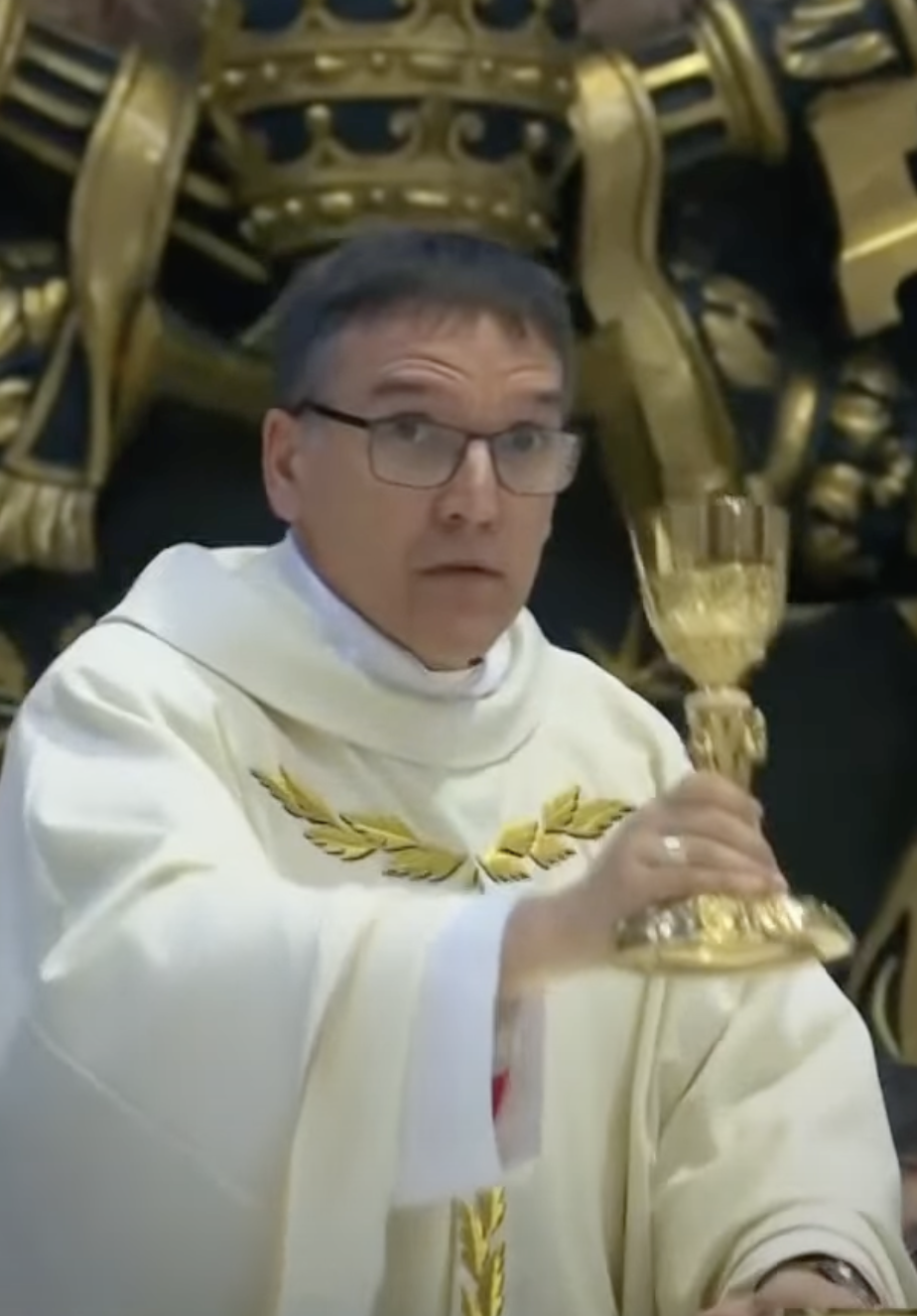
- Moreira in 2025
- Church: Roman Catholic Church
- Appointed: 8 September 2021
- Predecessor: Joël Mercier
- Previous posts: Secretary of the Congregation for the Clergy (2021–2025); Titular Archbishop of Tiburnia (2021–2025)

Orders
- Ordination: 3 July 1999 by Francisco Javier Errázuriz Ossa
- Consecration: 17 October 2021 by Pope Francis

Personal details
- Born: Andrés Gabriel Ferrada Moreira; 10 June 1969 (age 57) Santiago de Chile, Chile
- Education: Pontifical Gregorian University
- Motto: Omnia mea tua sunt
- Coat of arms

Ordination history
History
Priestly ordination
- Ordained by: Francisco Javier Errázuriz Ossa
- Date: 3 July 1999
Episcopal consecration
- Principal consecrator: Pope Francis
- Co-consecrators: Beniamino Stella and Lazarus You Heung-sik
- Date: 17 October 2021
- Place: St Peter's Basilica

Andrés Gabriel Ferrada Moreira (born 10 June 1969) is a Chilean Catholic prelate who has served as bishop of the Diocese of San Bartolomé de Chillán since 2025. He was previously the Secretary of the Dicastery for the Clergy from 2021 to 2025. From 2006 to 2018 he worked in his native Archdiocese of Santiago de Chile, afterwards beginning service in the dicastery.

== Biography ==
Andrés Gabriel Ferrada Moreira was born in Santiago de Chile on 10 June 1969. He was ordained a priest of the Archdiocese of Santiago on 3 July 1999. He studied for several years in Rome and earned a doctorate in theology at the Pontifical Gregorian University in 2006. In addition to pastoral assignments in that archdiocese, he was director of studies and prefect of theology at the Seminario Pontificio Mayor de los Santos Ángeles Custodios.

Ferrada's years in Santiago were marked by his association with Father Fernando Karadima, the charismatic leader of a group called the Priestly Union of the Sacred Heart, whom a 2011 Vatican investigation found guilty of sexually assault minors and abusing his authority, leading to his laicization in 2018. Ferrada met Karadima when he was 19, eventually joined his Union, and had Karadima as his spiritual adviser. He spoke weekly with Karadima while studying in Rome for five years. In 2010, Ferrada and several other priests, including his brother, disassociated themselves from Karadima saying they found accusations of sexual abuse on the part of Karadima credible. Ferrada later testified in court in support of victims of sexual abuse by Karadima, saying he had witnessed Karadima's abuse of power and unwanted sexual advances since the mid-1990s "but no one ever did anything about it". In defending himself against charges of spiritual manipulation, Karadima said Ferrada "has a difficult character and is somewhat reckless".

He joined the staff of the Congregation for the Clergy in 2018. On 8 September 2021, Pope Francis appointed him secretary of that Congregation, effective 1 October, and titular archbishop of Tiburnia. He was consecrated a bishop by Pope Francis on 17 October 2021.

On 31 October 2025, Pope Leo XIV appointed him Bishop of San Bartolomé de Chillán, while allowing him to retain the personal title of archbishop from his former titular see of Tiburnia.
