= Francisco de Borja Valenzuela Ríos =

Chilean bishop

- (Arch)Bishop of Valparaíso
- Church: Catholic Church
- Diocese: Diocese of Valparaíso
- In office: 3 May 1983 – 16 April 1993
- Predecessor: Emilio Tagle Covarrubias
- Successor: Jorge Medina
- Previous posts: (Arch)Bishop of San Felipe (1974-1983); Administrator of Calama (1965-1968); Archbishop of Antofagasta (1967-1974); Bishop of Antofagasta (1957-1967); Titular Bishop of Aegeae (1956-1957); Prelate of Copiapó (1956-1957); Apostolic Administrator of Copiapó (1955-1956)

Orders
- Ordination: 18 September 1943 by Eduardo Larraín Cordovez
- Consecration: 15 July 1956 by Sebastiano Baggio

Personal details
- Born: 10 October 1917 Buin, O'Higgins Province, Chile
- Died: 20 February 1998 (aged 80) Quilpué, Valparaíso Region, Chile

Francisco de Borja Valenzuela Ríos (10 October 1917 – 20 February 1998) was a Chilean bishop. After his episcopal consecration, he headed the dioceses of Copiapó -at the time, a territorial prelature- (1956–57), Antofagasta (1957–74), Calama (1965–68, 1970), San Felipe (1974–83), and Valparaíso (1983–93). He attended all four sessions of the Second Vatican Council.
