= Héctor Vargas Bastidas =

Chilean Roman Catholic prelate (1951–2022)

The Most Reverend Héctor Eduardo Vargas Bastidas
- Bishop of Temuco
- Diocese: Temuco
- Appointed: 14 May 2013
- Term ended: 7 March 2022
- Predecessor: Manuel Camilo Vial Risopatrón
- Previous post: Bishop of Arica (2003–2013)

Orders
- Ordination: 15 July 1978 by Tomás Osvaldo González Morales
- Consecration: 4 January 2004 by Francisco Javier Errázuriz Ossa

Personal details
- Born: 29 December 1951 Valdivia, Chile
- Died: 7 March 2022 (aged 70) Temuco, Chile
- Motto: Testimonio De Cristo Pastor
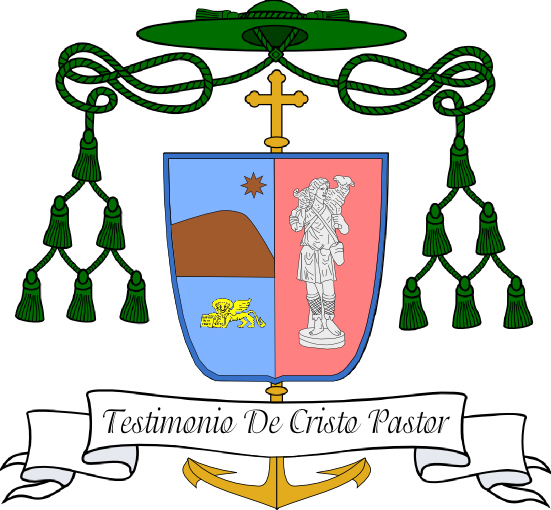
- Coat of arms

Styles of Héctor Vargas Bastidas
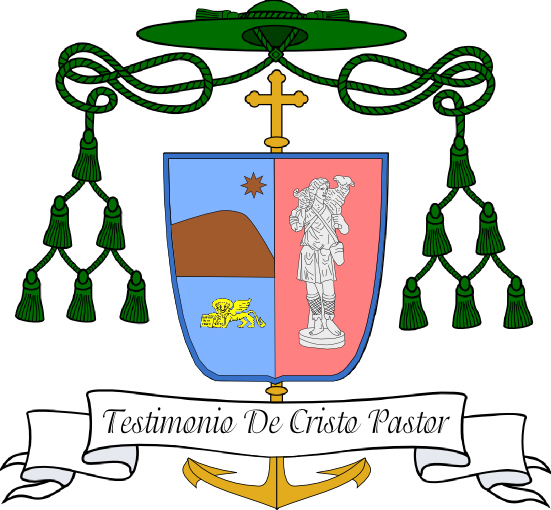
- Reference style: His Excellency; The Most Reverend
- Spoken style: Your Excellency
- Religious style: Bishop

Héctor Eduardo Vargas Bastidas (29 December 1951 – 7 March 2022) was a Chilean Roman Catholic prelate. He was Bishop of Arica from 25 November 2003 until 14 May 2013 and Bishop of Temuco from 14 May 2013 until his death.

Vargas Bastidas died on 7 March 2022, at the age of 70.

Catholic Church titles
Preceded by Manuel Camilo Vial Risopatrón	Bishop of Temuco; 2013–2022	Succeeded by Sede vacante
Preceded by Renato Hasche Sánchez	Bishop of Arica; 2003–2013	Succeeded by Juan José Chaparro Stivanello
