= Apostolic Nunciature to Chile =

Diplomatic post of the Holy See

The Apostolic Nuncio to Chile is the principal representative of the Pope to the Government of Chile.

== Apostolic Nuncios to Chile ==
- Giovanni Alessandro Muzi (18 April 1823 – 19 December 1825)
- Lorenzo Barili (26 May 1851 – 17 June 1856)
- Vincenzo Massoni (26 September 1856 – 3 June 1857)
- Marino Marini (14 August 1857 – 27 March 1865)
- Mario Mocenni (6 August 1877 – 27 February 1882)
- Celestino del Frate (30 March 1882 – 6 March 1883)
- Pietro Monti (20 December 1902 – 31 October 1907)
- Enrico Sibilia (31 August 1908 – April 1914)
- Sebastiano Nicotra (18 December 1916 – 1 October 1918)
- Benedetto Aloisi Masella (20 November 1919 – 26 April 1927)
- Ettore Felici (6 November 1927 – 20 April 1938)
- Aldo Laghi (28 August 1938 – 2 January 1942)
- Maurilio Silvani (23 May 1942 – 4 March 1946)
- Mario Zanin (21 March 1947 – 7 February 1953)
- Sebastiano Baggio (1 July 1953 – 12 March 1959)
- Opilio Rossi (25 Mar 1959 – 25 September 1961)
- Gaetano Alibrandi (5 October 1961 – 9 December 1963)
- Egano Righi-Lambertini (9 December 1963 – 8 July 1967)
- Carlo Martini (5 August 1967 – 6 July 1970)
- Sotero Sanz Villalba (16 July 1970 – 24 November 1977)
- Angelo Sodano (30 November 1977 – 23 May 1988)
- Giulio Einaudi (23 September 1988 – 29 February 1992)
- Piero Biggio (23 April 1992 – 27 February 1999)
- Luigi Ventura (25 March 1999 – 22 June 2001)
- Aldo Cavalli (28 June 2001 – 29 October 2007)
- Giuseppe Pinto (6 December 2007 – 15 July 2011)
- Ivo Scapolo (15 July 2011 – 29 August 2019)
- Alberto Ortega Martín (7 October 2019 – 14 May 2024)
- Kurian Mathew Vayalunkal (15 March 2025 – present)

== See also ==
- Roman Catholicism in Chile
- Religion in Chile
