= Carlos Pellegrín =

Roman Catholic bishop

Carlos Eduardo Pellegrin Barrera S.V.D.
- Bishop Emeritus of San Bartolomé de Chillán
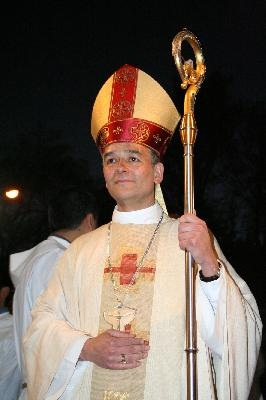
- Church: Catholic Church
- Diocese: Diocese of San Bartolomé de Chillán
- In office: 25 March 2006 – 21 September 2018
- Predecessor: Alberto Jara Franzoy
- Successor: Sergio Hernán Pérez de Arce Arraigada

Orders
- Ordination: 9 November 1985
- Consecration: 29 April 2006 by Francisco Javier Errázuriz Ossa

Personal details
- Born: 28 July 1958 (age 68) Santiago, Chile

Carlos Eduardo Pellegrín Barrera S.V.D. (born 28 July 1958) is a native of Chile and a former bishop of the Catholic Church. He was Bishop of Chillán from 2006 to 2018.

He is the subject of an investigation into sexual abuse and failure to report accusations of abuse to civil authorities.

== Biography ==
Carlos Eduardo Pellegrín Barrera was born in Santiago, Chile, on 28 July 1958. He joined the Society of the Divine Word in 1977. He studied philosophy and theology at the Major Pontifical Seminary of Santiago and at the Missionary Institute of London. He professed his first vows on 23 April 1978 and his perpetual vows on 25 March 1983.

He was ordained to the priesthood on 9 November 1985. He worked as a missionary in Ghana from 1986 to 1995. From 1996 to 1999 he was Secretary of Missions for the Society of the Divine Word in Chile. In 1999 he became Rector of the Divine Word School in Santiago and in 2004 took on additional responsibilities as the President of the Federation of Private Educational Institutions of Chile.

On 25 March 2006 Pope Benedict XVI named him Bishop of Chillán. He received his episcopal consecration from Francisco Javier Errázuriz Ossa and was installed as bishop on 29 April 2006.

On 18 May 2018, Caro submitted his resignation to Pope Francis, as did all the Chilean bishops at the conclusion of a three-day meeting in Rome.

In August 2018, prosecutors announced that Pellegrín had been accused of sexual abuse, the first active bishop in Chile to face such charges. He said was eager to cooperate: "My conscience is totally clean, I feel free of heart and ... I trust in the justice of Chile".

Pope Francis accepted his resignation on 21 September 2018. Charges of concealment of abuse were added later. Pellegrín said he planned to take "necessary legal actions against many who have insulted me in different ways - in the media too - because I am a citizen of Chile. I put myself in the hands of justice, but I will also ask for justice for me when the time comes".

== See also ==
- Catholic Church in Chile
- Catholic sexual abuse cases in Chile
