= Diocese of San Marcos de Arica =

Catholic ecclesiastical territory

Diocese of San Marcos de Arica Dioecesis Sancti Marci Aricensis Diócesis de San Marcos de Arica

Catholic
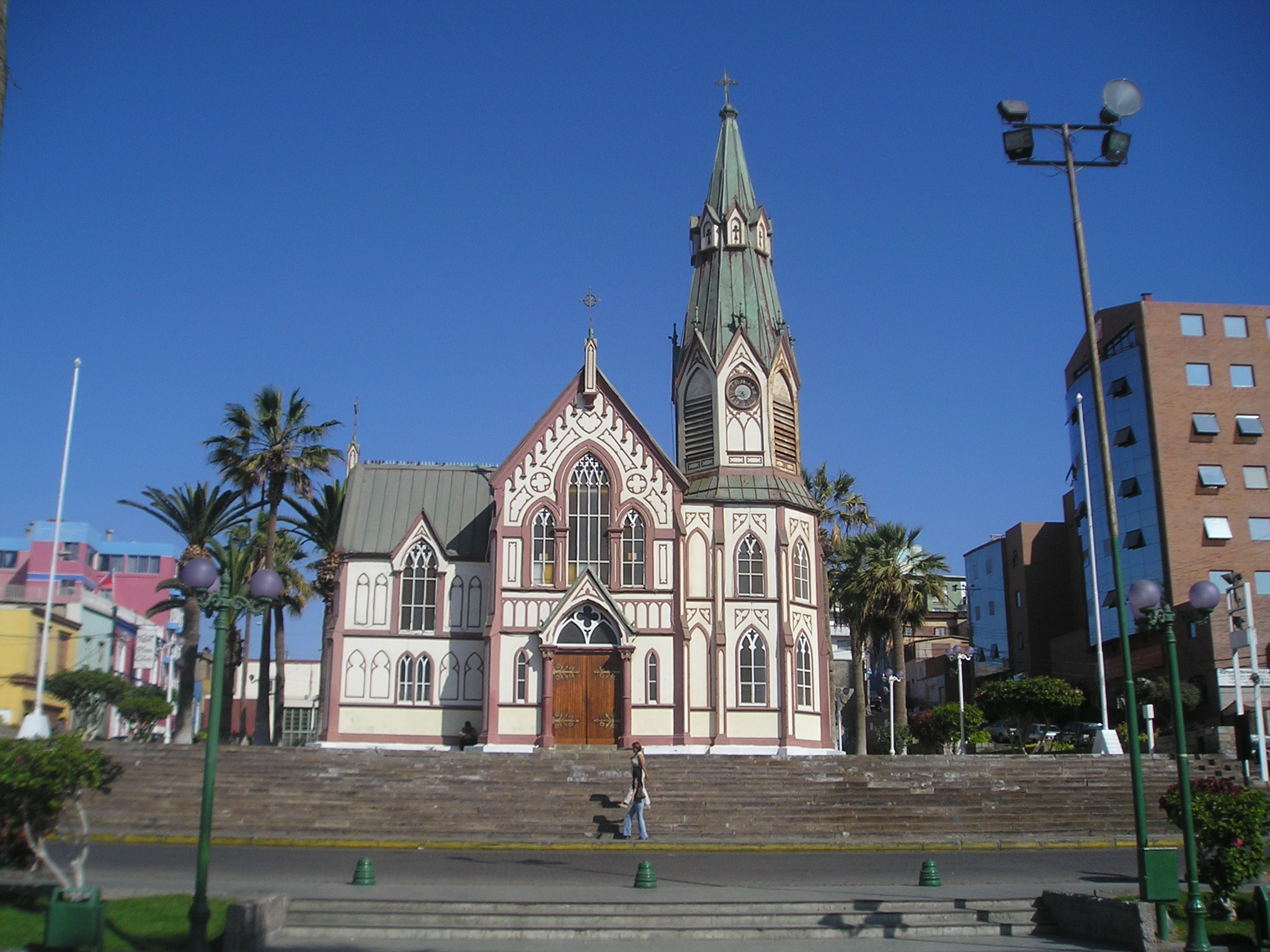
- Cathedral of St. Mark

Location
- Country: Chile
- Ecclesiastical province: Antofagasta
- Metropolitan: Antofagasta

Statistics
- Area: 16,512 km^{2} (6,375 sq mi)
- Population: Total; Catholics: (as of 2014); 198,400; 140,000 (70.7%)

Information
- Rite: Latin Rite
- Established: 17 February 1959 (67 years ago)
- Cathedral: Cathedral of St Mark in Arica
- Patron saint: St Mark the Evangelist

Current leadership
- Pope: Leo XIV
- Bishop: Moises Carlos Atisha Contreras
- Metropolitan Archbishop: Ignacio Francisco Ducasse Medina

Website
- www.obispadoarica.cl

The Roman Catholic Diocese of San Marcos de Arica (Latin: Sancti Marci Aricensis) is a diocese located in the city of Arica in the ecclesiastical province of Antofagasta in Chile.

== History ==
- 17 February 1959: Established as Territorial Prelature of Arica from the Diocese of Iquique
- 29 August 1986: Promoted as Diocese of Arica
- 12 October 2011: Name Changed to Diocese of San Marcos de Arica

== Leadership, in reverse chronological order ==
- Bishops of Arica (Roman rite)
  - Bishop Moises Carlos Atisha Contreras, Sch.P. (2014.11.21 – present)
  - Bishop Héctor Vargas Bastidas, S.D.B. (2003.11.25 – 2013.05.14), appointed Bishop of Temuco
  - Bishop Renato Hasche Sánchez, S.J. (1993.05.15 – 2003.04.24)
  - Bishop Ramón Salas Valdés, S.J. (1986.08.29 – 1993.05.15)
- Prelates of Arica (Roman rite)
  - Bishop Ramón Salas Valdés, S.J. (1963.10.08 – 1986.08.29)

== Sources ==
- GCatholic.org
- Catholic Hierarchy
- Diocese website
