= Polidoro Van Vlierberghe =

Cirilo Polidoro Van Vlierberghe O.F.M. (March 6, 1909 – May 9, 2006) was a Franciscan priest and former Bishop of Illapel and Titular Bishop of Municipa.

Van Vlierberghe was born 1909 in Waesmunster, Belgium. He became a Franciscan priest on August 19, 1934, ordained by Archbishop Alfredo Cifuentes Gómez, then Bishop of the Diocese of Antofagasta, Chile. On June 27, 1966, he became Bishop of Illapel, Chile. He retired on August 11, 1984 and died in Santiago on May 9, 2006.
