= Diocese of Copiapó =

Catholic ecclesiastical territory

Coordinates: 27.3661°S 70.3333°W

Diocese of Copiapó Dioecesis Copiapoënsis Diócesis de Copiapó

Catholic
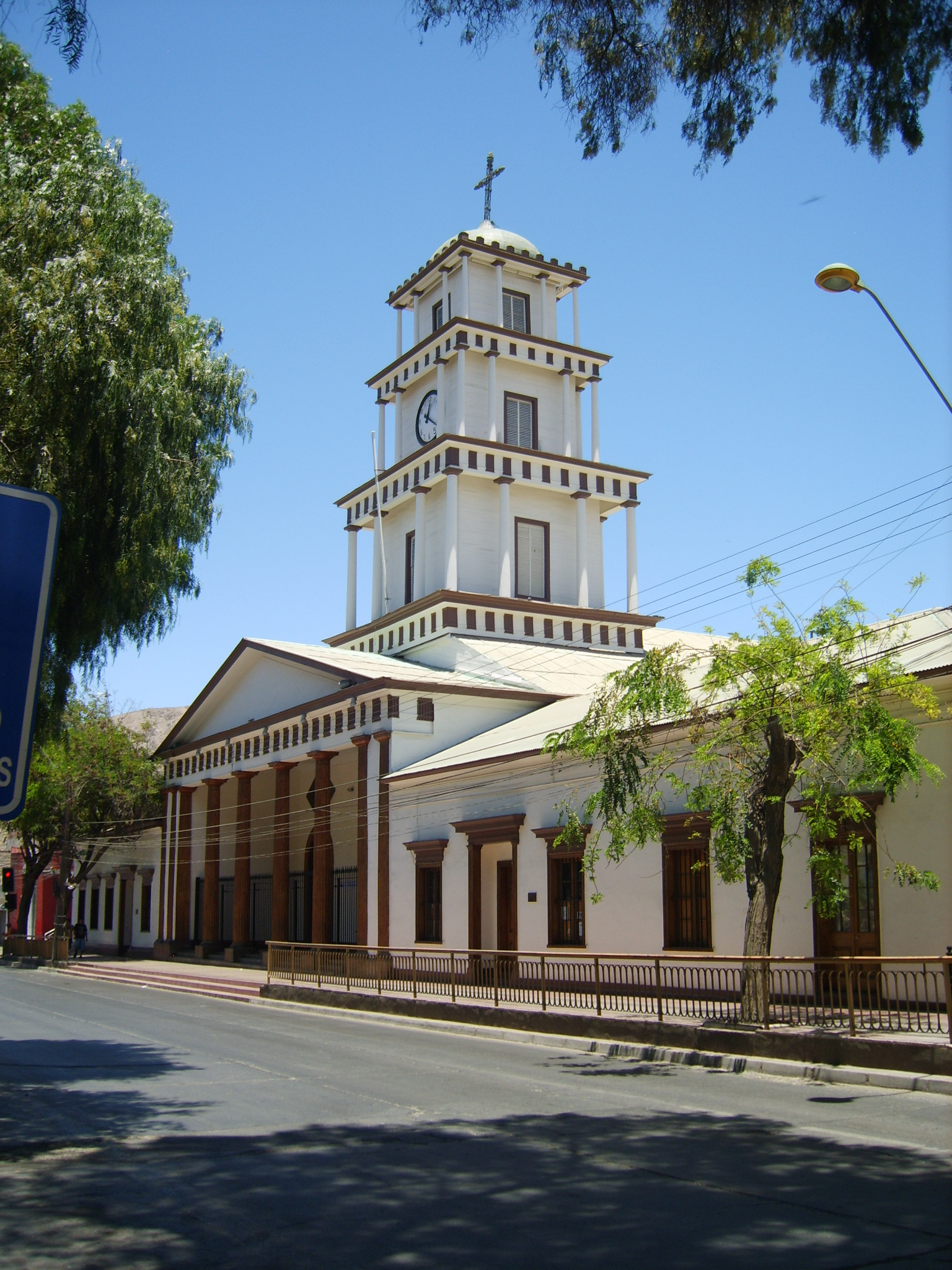
- Cathedral of Our Lady of the Rosary

Location
- Country: Chile
- Ecclesiastical province: La Serena
- Metropolitan: La Serena

Statistics
- Area: 80,000 km^{2} (31,000 sq mi)
- Population: Total; Catholics: (as of 2006); 254,336; 193,524 (76.1%)

Information
- Rite: Latin Rite
- Established: 9 November 1946 (79 years ago)
- Cathedral: Cathedral of Our Lady of the Rosary in Copiapó
- Patron saint: Our Lady of the Rosary

Current leadership
- Pope: Leo XIV
- Bishop: Ricardo Basilio Morales Galindo, O. de M.
- Metropolitan Archbishop: René Osvaldo Rebolledo Salinas
- Bishops emeritus: Gaspar Francisco Quintana Jorquera, C.M.F.

Website
- diocesisdecopiapo.cl

The Roman Catholic Diocese of Copiapó (Latin: Copiapoën(sis)) is a diocese located in the city of Copiapó in the ecclesiastical province of La Serena in Chile.

== History ==
- 9 November 1946: Established as Apostolic Administration of Copiapó
- 21 April 1955: Promoted as Territorial Prelature of Copiapó
- 31 October 1957: Promoted as Diocese of Copiapó

== Leadership, in reverse chronological order ==
- Bishop Ricardo Basilio Morales Galindo, O. de M. (2020.06.20 – present)
- Bishop Celestino Aós Braco, O.F.M. Cap. (2014.10.18 – 2019.03.23), appointed Apostolic Administrator of Santiago de Chile
- Bishop Gaspar Quintana Jorquera, C.M.F. (2001.05.26 – 2014.07.25)
- Bishop Fernando Ariztía Ruiz (1976.12.11 – 2001.05.26)
- Bishop Carlos Marcio Camus Larenas (1968.01.31 – 1976.12.11), appointed Bishop of Linares
- Bishop Juan Francisco Fresno Larraín (1958.06.15 – 1967.06.28), appointed Archbishop of La Serena; future Cardinal
- Bishop Francisco de Borja Valenzuela Ríos (1955.06.27 – 1957.08.20), appointed Bishop of Antofagasta; future Archbishop
- Archbishop Alfredo Cifuentes Gómez (Apostolic Administrator 1947.03.19 – 1948.06.17)

== Sources ==
- GCatholic.org
- Catholic Hierarchy
- Diocesan website
