= Diocese of San Juan de Calama =

Catholic ecclesiastical territory

Diocese of San Juan de Calama Sancti Ioannis Calamensis Diócesis de San Juan Bautista de Calama

Catholic

Location
- Country: Chile
- Ecclesiastical province: Antofagasta
- Metropolitan: Antofagasta

Statistics
- Area: 43,000 km^{2} (17,000 sq mi)
- Population: Total; Catholics: (as of 2014); 191,000; 150,300 (78.7%)

Information
- Denomination: Catholic Church
- Rite: Latin Rite
- Established: 21 July 1965 (61 years ago)
- Cathedral: Cathedral of St John the Baptist in Calama
- Patron saint: St John the Baptist

Current leadership
- Bishop: Tomás Carrasco Cortés
- Metropolitan Archbishop: Ignacio Francisco Ducasse Medina

Website
- www.iglesiadecalama.cl

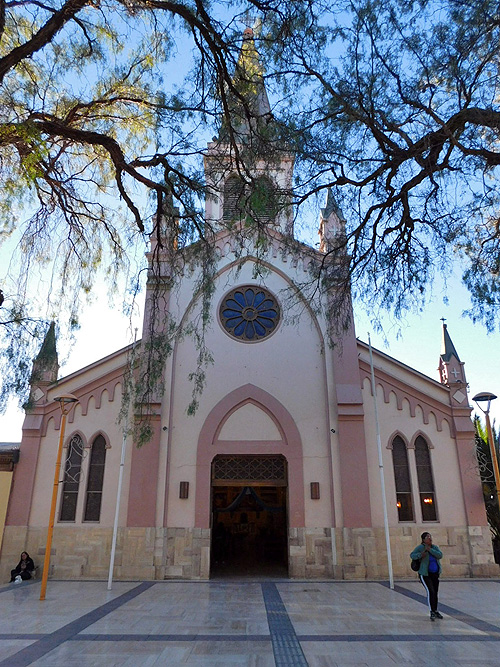

The Diocese of San Juan de Calama (Latin: Sancti Ioannis Calamensis) is a diocese located in the city of Calama in the ecclesiastical province of Antofagasta in Chile.

== History ==
- 21 July 1965: Established as the Territorial Prelature of Calama from Diocese of Antofagasta and Diocese of Iquique
- 20 February 2010: Promoted as Diocese of San Juan de Calama

== Leadership, in reverse chronological order ==
- Bishops of San Juan Bautista de Calama (Roman rite), below
  - Bishop Tomás Carrasco Cortés (2023.05.24 – Present)
  - Bishop Óscar Hernán Blanco Martínez (2016.03.21 – 2022.07.13), appointed Bishop of Punta Arenas
  - Bishop Guillermo Patricio Vera Soto (2010.02.20 – 2014.02.22), appointed Bishop of Iquique
- Territorial Prelates of Calama (Roman rite), below
  - Bishop Guillermo Patricio Vera Soto (2003.04.10 – 2010.02.20)
  - Bishop Cristián Contreras Molina, O. de M. (1992.06.11 – 2002.07.19), appointed Bishop of San Felipe
  - Bishop Juan Bautista Herrada Armijo, O. de M. (1982.03.05 – 1991.11.30)
  - Bishop Juan Bautista Herrada Armijo, O. de M. (Apostolic Administrator 1976.02.26 – 1982.03.05)
  - Archbishop Carlos Oviedo Cavada, O. de M. (Apostolic Administrator 1974–1976); future Cardinal
  - Bishop Juan Luis Ysern de Arce (Apostolic Administrator 1972.05.20 – 1974.06.02)
  - Archbishop Francisco de Borja Valenzuela Ríos (Apostolic Administrator 1970.04 – 1970.06.02)
  - Bishop Orozimbo Fuenzalida y Fuenzalida (1968.03.13 – 1970.02.26), appointed Bishop of Los Angeles
  - Archbishop Francisco de Borja Valenzuela Ríos (Apostolic Administrator 1965.07.21 – 1968.05.19)

== Sources ==
- GCatholic.org
- Catholic Hierarchy
- Diocese website
