= Villamagna in Tripolitania =

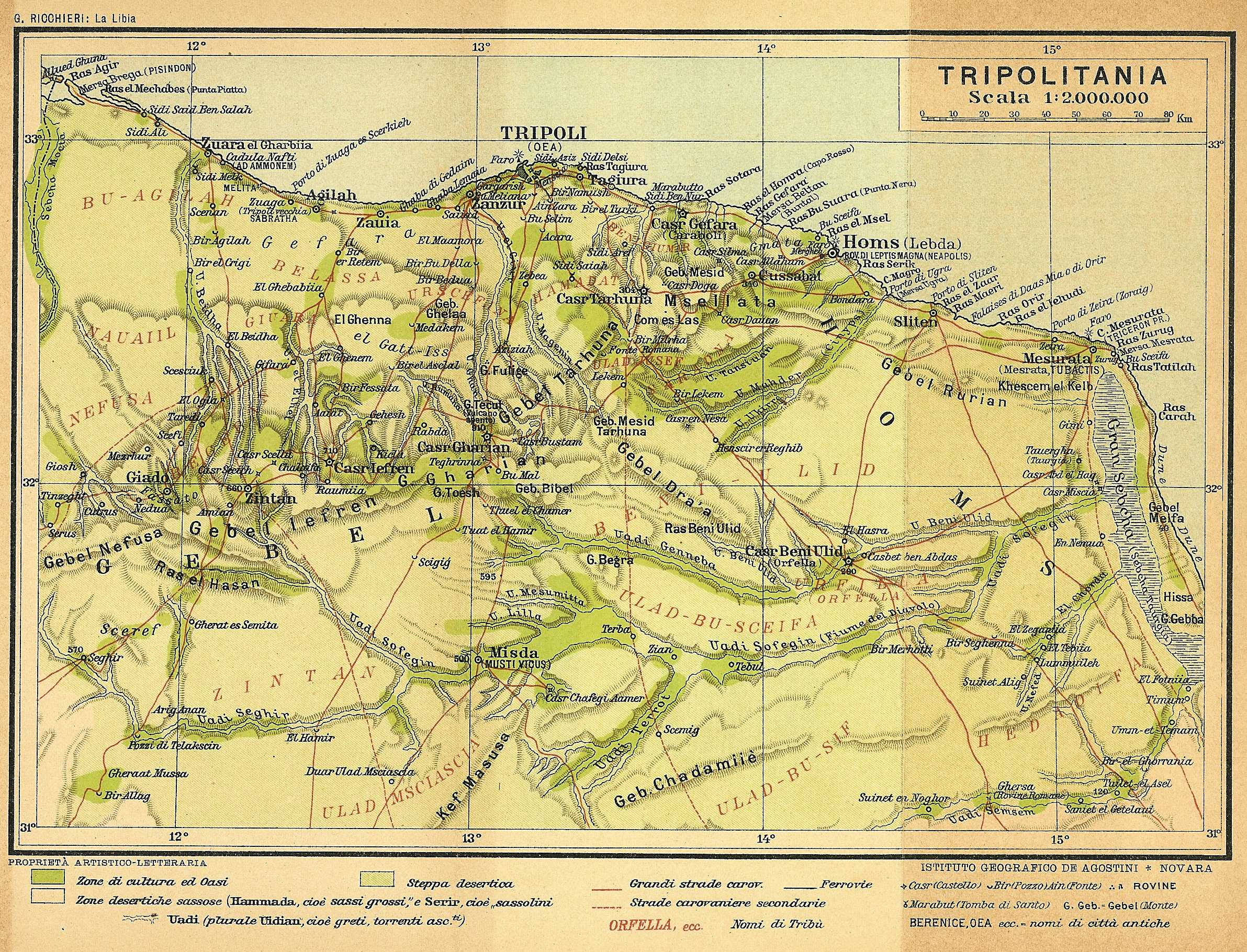
Tripolitania.

Villamagna of Tripolitania was a Roman era settlement in what was the Roman province of Tripolitania. The town is identifiable with ruins at Henchir-Sidi-Abdein in today's Libya.

The city was also an ancient episcopal see of the Roman province of Tripolitania . The only known bishop of this diocese is known from antiquity: The Donatist bishop Rogaziano, who took part in the Council of Carthage (411). There was no Catholic bishop from the town mentioned.

Today Villamagna of Tripolitania survives as titular see of the Catholic Church and the titular bishop has been Peter Birkhofer, Auxiliary Bishop of Freiburg im Breisgau, Germany, since 19 February 2018.

== See also ==
- Villamagna in Proconsulari
