= Our Lady of Mercy Cathedral, La Serena =

Coordinates: 29.9030°S 71.2510°W

Our Lady of Mercy Cathedral
- Catedral de La Serena
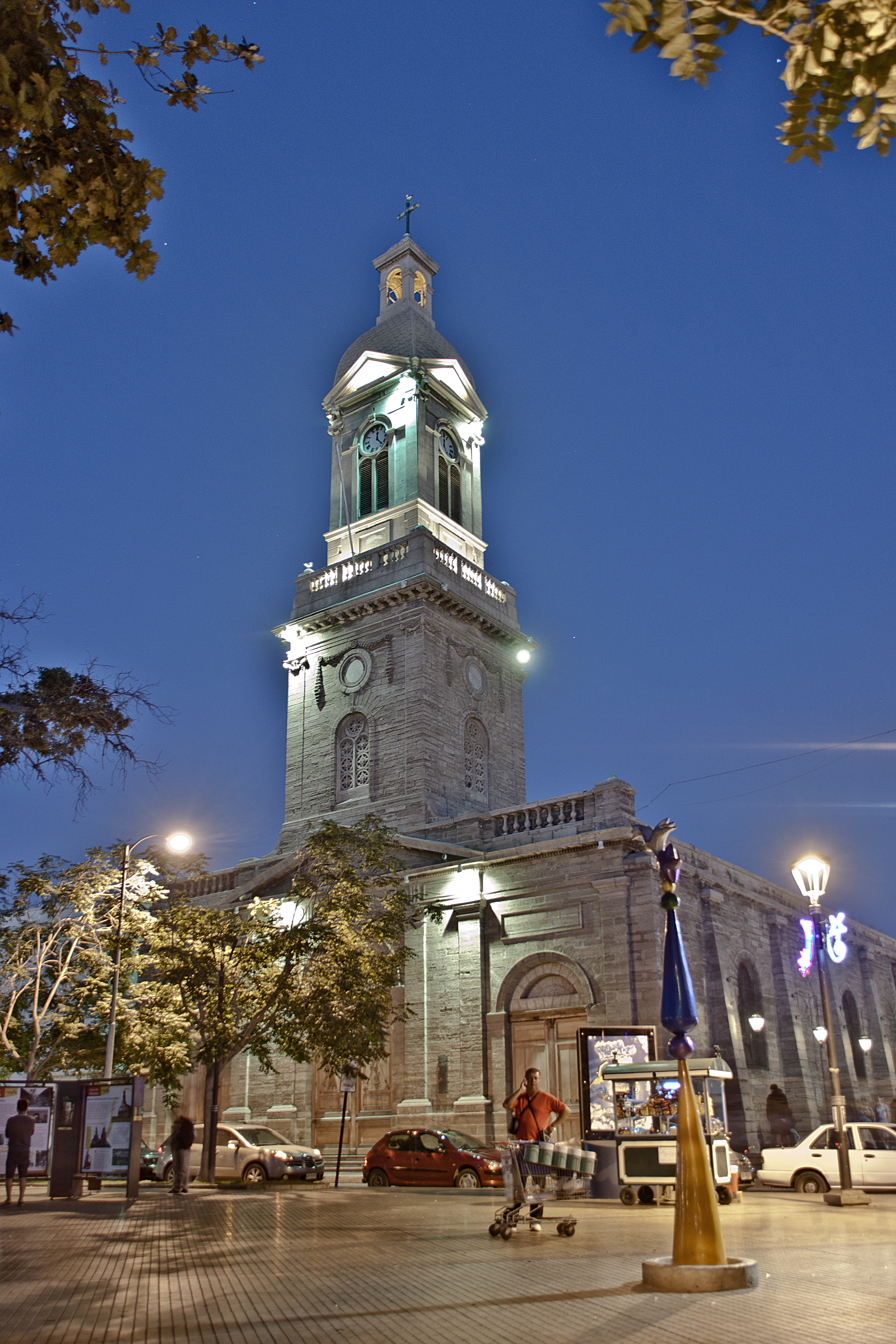
- Our Lady of Mercy Cathedral
- Location: La Serena
- Country: Chile
- Denomination: Roman Catholic Church

The Our Lady of Mercy Cathedral (Spanish: Catedral de la Merced) also called La Serena Cathedral It is the cathedral of the Archdiocese of La Serena. It is the largest temple in the city, and one of the cathedrals of Chile and is located in the northeastern corner of the Plaza de Armas in La Serena, at the intersection of Los Carrera street with the Cordovez street.

The church is built on the site of the former parish church La Matriz-El Sagrario, which was erected in 1549 as part of the construction of the foundational buildings of the city. In 1741, the church was described as a single-nave building measuring 50 meters long by 10 meters wide, with 7 altars and a mid-rise tower to the right of the main entrance. Its walls were made of limestone slabs cemented with lime mortar. In 1840 the Parish of the Matrix was demolished, and the construction of the present cathedral was begun in 1844 reusing many of the old building materials. The architect responsible was the French Juan Herbage.

Built in neoclassical style, it was completed in 1856.

== See also ==
- Roman Catholicism in Chile
- Our Lady of Mercy

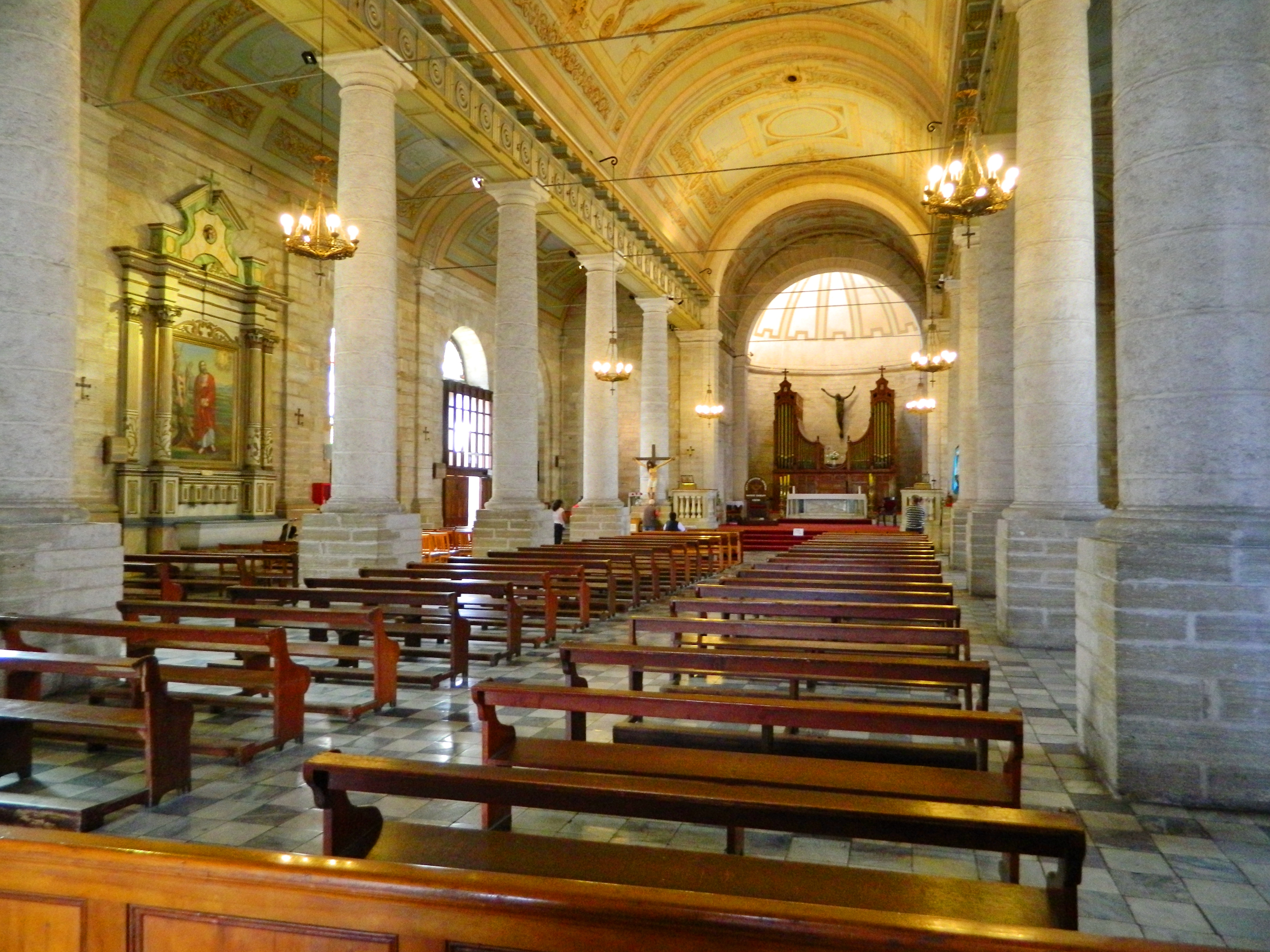
Internal view
