= Giulio Einaudi (prelate) =

Italian nuncio (1928–2017)

Giulio Einaudi (11 February 1928 – 28 December 2017) was an Italian prelate of the Catholic Church who devoted his entire career to the diplomatic service of the Holy See. He became an archbishop in 1977 and served as an Apostolic Nuncio from then until his death.

== Biography ==
Giulio Einaudi was born on 11 February 1928 in San Damiano Macra, Italy. He was the son of a farmer and fought in the Italian infantry in World War I. He attended the minor seminary of Sant'Agostino and the major seminary of San Nicola in Saluzzo. He was ordained a priest on 29 June 1951. He worked for three years as deputy curate in the parish of the Cathedral of Saluzzo and then studied in Rome at the Pontifical Gregorian University and the Pontifical Lateran University, earning degrees in theology in 1956 and canon law in 1960.

To prepare for a diplomatic career he entered the Pontifical Ecclesiastical Academy in 1958. He joined the diplomatic service of the Holy See on 1 August 1960.

From 1960 to 1965 he was secretary of nunciature in Thailand, Malaysia and Singapore, based in Bangkok. From 1965 to 1971 he was auditor in the nunciature to the United States, and from 1971 to 1974 counselor in the nunciatures to Rwanda and Burundi. From 1974 to 1976 he was councilor of the nunciature to Portugal.

On 10 November 1976, Pope Paul VI named him titular archbishop of Villamagna in Tripolitania and Apostolic Pro-Nuncio to Pakistan. He received his episcopal consecration in Saluzzo on 2 January 1977 from Cardinal Agnelo Rossi.

On 5 August 1980, Pope John Paul II named him Apostolic Pro-Nuncio to Cuba. He reinvigorated, with some success, the process of rapprochement between the Church and the Castro government, which had seen little progress in the five years before his appointment.

On 23 September 1988, Pope John Paul appointed him Apostolic Nuncio to Chile.

On 29 February 1992, Pope John Paul appointed him Apostolic Nuncio to Croatia. He was the first nuncio to that newly independent nation, which the Holy See had been the first country to recognize.

He retired upon the appointment of his successor, Francisco-Javier Lozano Sebastián, on 4 August 2003.

He died in Santa Croce Hospital in Cuneo on 28 December 2017 after being taken ill at his home in Busca.
