= Sotero Sanz Villalba =

Spanish prelate

- Apostolic Delegate to Mexico
- Church: Catholic Church
- In office: 24 November 1977 – 17 January 1978
- Predecessor: Mario Pio Gaspari
- Successor: Girolamo Prigione
- Other post: Titular Archbishop of Emerita Augusta (1970-1978)
- Previous post: Apostolic Nuncio to Chile (1970-1977)

Orders
- Ordination: 4 July 1942 by Benjamín de Arriba y Castro
- Consecration: 12 September 1970 by Vicente Enrique y Tarancón

Personal details
- Born: 22 April 1919 El Buste, Province of Zaragoza, Kingdom of Spain
- Died: 17 January 1978 (aged 58) Santiago, Chile

Sotero Sanz Villalba (22 April 1919 – 17 January 1978) was a Spanish prelate of the Catholic Church who worked in the diplomatic service of the Holy See.

== Biography ==
Sotero Sanz Villalba was born on 22 April 1919 in El Buste, Aragon, Spain. He studied at the diocesan seminaries of Tarazona and Tudela and at the Pontifical University of Comillas, where he received his doctorate in canon law. He was ordained a priest on 4 July 1942 in Comillas. He then held a series of posts at the seminary of Tarazona.

He completed the course of study at the Pontifical Ecclesiastical Academy in 1948. He entered the diplomatic service of the Holy See and became head of the Spanish language section of the Secretariat of State. He served as Spanish interpreter when groups had private audiences with Popes John XXIII and Paul VI. In 1967 he was named the Secretariat's chief of protocol.

On 16 July 1970, Pope Paul VI named him Titular Archbishop of Emerita Augusta and Apostolic Nuncio to Chile. He received his episcopal consecration from Cardinal Vicente Enrique y Tarancón, Archbishop of Toledo, on 12 September in the Basilica of Pilar in Zaragoza.

On 24 November 1977, Pope Paul appointed him Apostolic Delegate to Mexico, but his illness prevented him from taking up that post. While making preparations to move to Mexico, his illness suddenly worsened and he died on 17 January 1978 in Catholic University Hospital in Santiago de Chile at the age of 58.

== Decorations ==
- Grand Officer of the Order of Isabella the Catholic (Spain)
- Officer of the Merit Civil Order (Spain)
- Commander of the Order of the Sun (Peru)
