= Archdiocese of La Serena =

Catholic ecclesiastical territory

Coordinates: 29.9030°S 71.2510°W

Archdiocese of La Serena Archidioecesis Serenensis Arquidiócesis de La Serena

Catholic
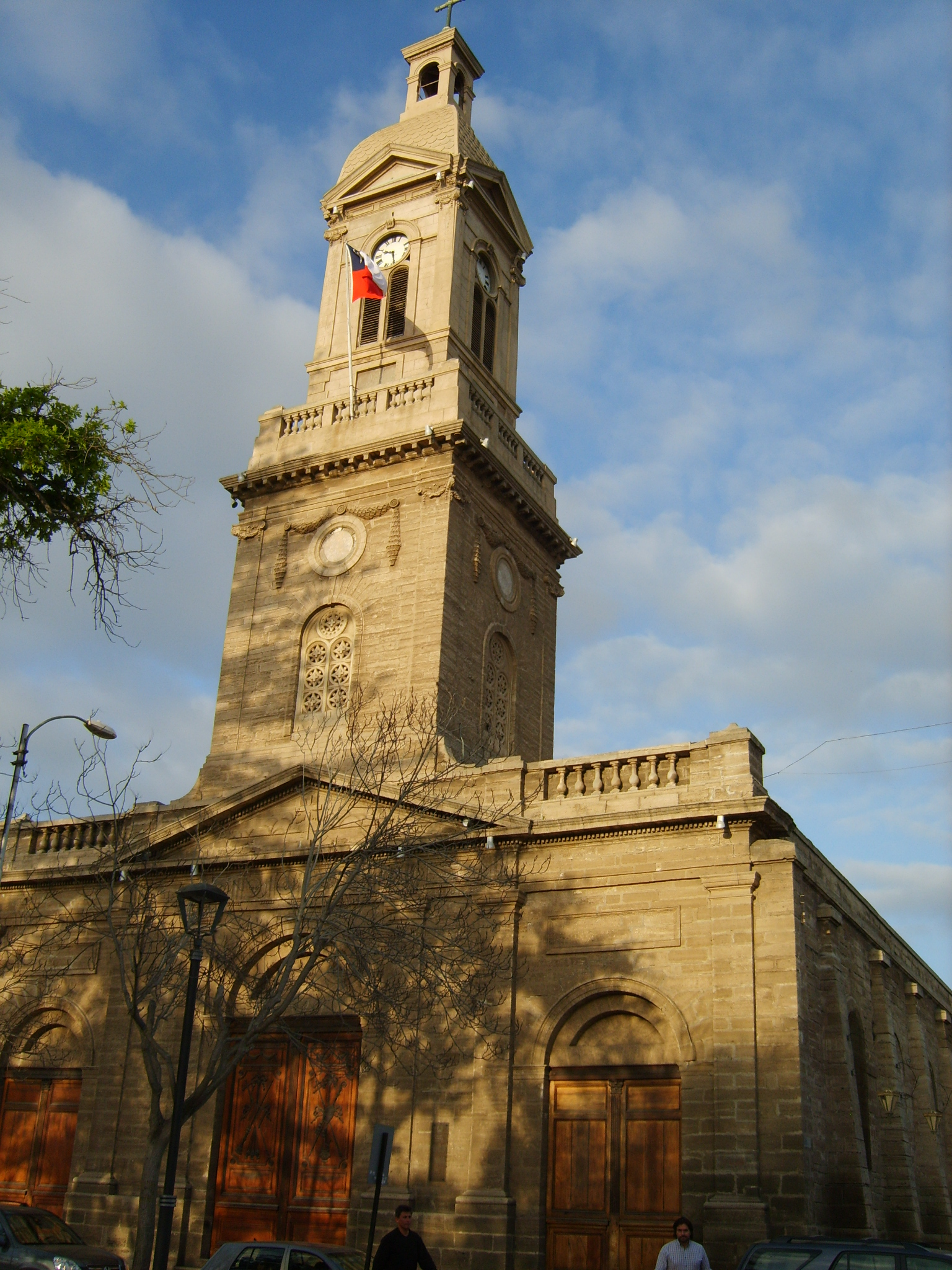
- Cathedral of Our Lady of Mercy

Location
- Country: Chile
- Ecclesiastical province: La Serena

Statistics
- Area: 30,596 km^{2} (11,813 sq mi)
- Population: Total; Catholics: (as of 2004); 521,529; 428,702 (82.2%)

Information
- Rite: Latin Rite
- Established: 1 July 1840 (186 years ago)
- Cathedral: Cathedral of Our Lady of Mercy in La Serena
- Patron saint: Our Lady of the Rosary

Current leadership
- Pope: Leo XIV
- Metropolitan Archbishop: René Osvaldo Rebolledo Salinas
- Bishops emeritus: Luis Gleisner Wobbe

Website
- www.arzobispadodelaserena.cl

The Roman Catholic Archdiocese of La Serena (Latin: Serenen(sis)) is an archdiocese located in the city of La Serena in Chile.

== History ==
- 1 July 1840: Established as Diocese of La Serena from the Metropolitan Archdiocese of Santiago de Chile
- 29 May 1939: Promoted as Metropolitan Archdiocese of La Serena

== Special churches ==
- Minor Basilicas:
  - Basílica - Santuario Nuestra Señora de Andacollo, Andacollo

== Current Leadership ==
On Saturday, December 14, 2013, Pope Francis accepted the resignation from the pastoral governance of the Roman Catholic Archdiocese of La Serena, presented by Archbishop Manuel Donoso, SS.CC., in accordance with Canon 401.1 of the Latin Rite 1983 Code of Canon Law (Bishops must offer their resignations to the Pope for possible acceptance upon turning 75). Pope Francis appointed as the next Archbishop of the Roman Catholic Archdiocese of La Serena, Archbishop René Osvaldo Rebolledo Salinas, who until then had been Bishop of the Roman Catholic Diocese of Osorno, in Osorno, Chile. On October 11, 2018, Pope Francis laicized former Archbishop Francisco José Cox Huneeus amid accusations of sexual abuse against children.

== Bishops ==
=== Ordinaries, in reverse chronological order ===
- Archbishops of La Serena (Roman rite), below
  - Archbishop René Osvaldo Rebolledo Salinas (2013.12.14 – present)
  - Archbishop Manuel Gerardo Donoso Donoso, SS.CC. (1997.04.16 – 2013.12.14)
  - Archbishop Francisco José Cox Huneeus (1990.09.29 – 1997.04.16)
  - Archbishop Bernardino Piñera Carvallo (1983.07.01 – 1990.09.29)
  - Archbishop Juan Francisco Fresno Larraín (1967.06.28 – 1983.05.03), appointed Archbishop of Santiago de Chile (Cardinal in 1985)
  - Archbishop Alfredo Cifuentes Gómez (1943.06.05 – 1967.03.10)
  - Archbishop Juan Subercaseaux Errázuriz (1940.01.08 – 1942.08.09)
  - Archbishop José María Caro Rodríguez (see below 1939.05.20 – 1939.08.28), appointed Archbishop of Santiago de Chile (Cardinal in 1946)
- Bishops of La Serena (Roman rite), below
  - Bishop José María Caro Rodríguez (1925.12.14 – 1939.05.20 see above); future Cardinal
  - Bishop Carlos Silva Cotapos (1918.02.20 – 1925.12.14), appointed Archbishop of Santiago de Chile
  - Bishop Ramón Angel Jara Ruz (1909.08.31 – 1917.03.09)
  - Bishop Florencio Eduardo Fontecilla Sánchez (1890.06.26 – 1909.03.03)

=== Coadjutor archbishops ===
- Arturo Mery Beckdorf (1963-1967), did not succeed to see
- Francisco José Cox Huneeus, P. Schönstatt (1985-1990)

=== Auxiliary bishops ===
- Guillermo Juan Carter Gallo (1893-1895), appointed Vicar Apostolic of Tarapacá
- Eduardo Solar Vicuña (1914-1920)
- Manuel Gerardo Donoso Donoso, SS.CC. (1996-1997), appointed Archbishop here
- Luis Gleisner Wobbe (2001-2014)

=== Other priests of this diocese who became bishops ===
- Pedro Aguilera Narbona, appointed Bishop of Iquique in 1941
- José del Carmen Valle Gallardo, appointed Auxiliary Bishop of Iquique in 1963

== Suffragan dioceses ==
- Diocese of Copiapó
- Territorial Prelature of Illapel

== Sources ==
- GCatholic.org
- Catholic Hierarchy
- Diocese website
