= Juan Francisco Fresno =

Chilean cardinal (1914-2004)

His Eminence Juan Francisco Fresno Larraín
- Archbishop Emeritus of Santiago
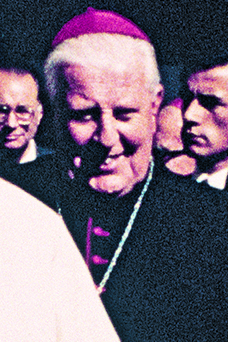
- The cardinal in 1987 during the papal visit to Chile.
- Church: Latin Church
- Archdiocese: Santiago
- See: Santiago
- Appointed: 3 May 1983
- Installed: 10 June 1983
- Term ended: 30 March 1990
- Predecessor: Raúl Silva Henríquez
- Successor: Carlos Oviedo Cavada
- Other post: Cardinal-Priest of Santa Maria Immacolata di Lourdes a Boccea (1985–2004)
- Previous posts: Bishop of Copiapó (1958–71); Archbishop of La Serena (1971–83); President of the Chilean Episcopal Conference (1976–77)

Orders
- Ordination: 18 December 1937 by José Horacio Campillo Infante
- Consecration: 15 August 1958 by Alfredo Cifuentes Gómez
- Created cardinal: 25 May 1985 by Pope John Paul II
- Rank: Cardinal-Priest

Personal details
- Born: Juan Francisco Fresno Larraín; 26 July 1914 Santiago, Chile
- Died: 14 October 2004 (aged 90) Santiago, Chile
- Buried: Santiago Cathedral
- Parents: Luis Alfredo Fresno Ingunza; Elena Larraín Hurtado
- Education: Pontifical Catholic University of Chile; Pontifical Gregorian University
- Motto: Adveniat regnum Tuum
- Coat of arms: Juan Francisco Fresno Larraín's coat of arms

Styles of Juan Francisco Fresno Larraín
- Reference style: His Eminence
- Spoken style: Your Eminence
- Religious style: Cardinal
- Informal style: Cardinal
- See: Santiago de Chile

Juan Francisco Fresno Larraín (26 July 1914 – 14 October 2004) was a Chilean cardinal of the Latin Church. He served as Archbishop of Santiago de Chile from 1983 to 1990, and was elevated to the Cardinalate in 1985.

== Early life and ordination ==
He was born in Santiago de Chile as the son of Luis Alfredo Fresno Ingunza y Elena Larraín Hurtado. He was educated at the seminary of Santiago de Chile and later at the Pontifical Gregorian University, Rome where he earned a licentiate in theology. He was ordained to the priesthood on 18 December 1937 at the cathedral of Santiago, by Horacio Campillo, archbishop of Santiago.

== Priest and bishop ==
Between 1937 and 1958 he worked as a pastor, in spiritual director and was vice-director of the Minor Seminary. S.S. Pope Pius XII appointed him bishop of Copiapó on 15 June 1958. He attended the Second Vatican Council. He was promoted to the metropolitan see of La Serena on 28 July 1971 by Pope Paul VI.

== President of the Episcopal Conference of Chile ==
He was elected President of the Episcopal Conference of Chile in 1975. He played a key role in the efforts to restore democracy in Chile during the military dictatorship of Augusto Pinochet by making contact with opposition leaders and persuaded them to unite in a pro-democracy effort that included Marxists and the democratic right. After the fall of Pinochet he promoted their first tense contacts with the government and was one of the supporters of Acuerdo Nacional para la Transición a la Democracia Plena (National Agreement for the Transition to Full Democracy). This in turn led to the 1988 Chilean national plebiscite that marked the beginning of the end of the military regime.

== Cardinal ==
Pope John Paul II named him Archbishop of Santiago de Chile on 3 May 1983. He was created Cardinal-Priest of S. Maria Immacolata di Lourdes a Boccea in the consistory of 25 May 1985. He resigned the pastoral government of the archdiocese on 30 March 1990. He lost the right to participate in a conclave when turning 80, in 1994.

== Death ==
He died 14 October 2004 at 8:50 p.m in his private residence in Santiago.

Religious titles
Preceded by Raúl Silva Henríquez	Archbishop of Santiago de Chile; 3 May 1983 – 30 March 1990	Succeeded by Carlos Oviedo Cavada
