= René Osvaldo Rebolledo Salinas =

Chilean Roman Catholic prelate (born 1958)

The Most Reverend René Osvaldo Rebolledo Salinas
- Archbishop of La Serena
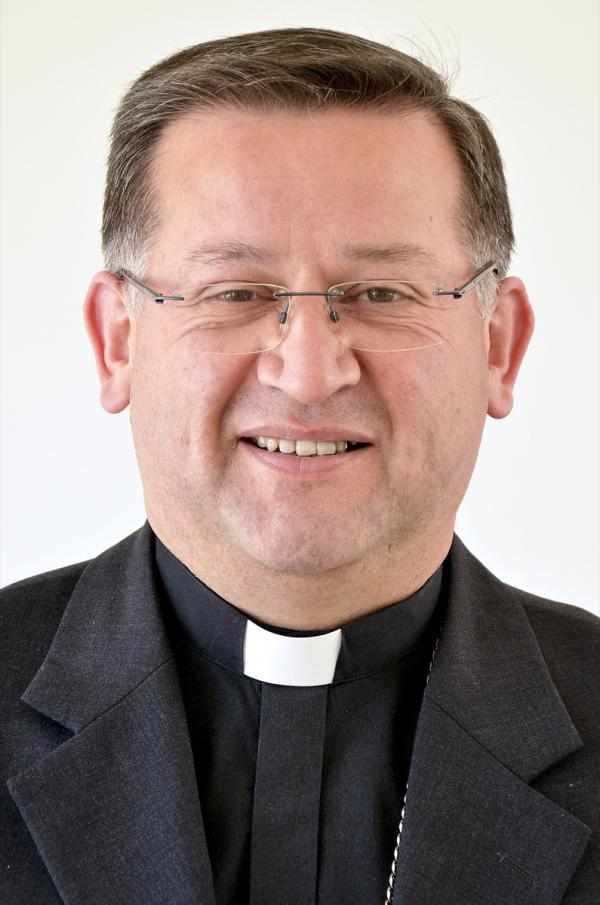
- Church: Roman Catholic Church
- Archdiocese: La Serena
- See: La Serena
- Appointed: 14 December 2013
- Installed: 10 March 2014
- Predecessor: Manuel Gerardo Donoso Donoso
- Other post: Vice-President of the Chilean Episcopal Conference (2018-)
- Previous post: Bishop of Osorno (2004-13)

Orders
- Ordination: 25 August 1984 by Sixto Parzinger Foidl
- Consecration: 19 June 2004 by Francisco Javier Errázuriz Ossa

Personal details
- Born: René Osvaldo Rebolledo Salinas; 22 September 1958 (age 67) Cunco, Chile
- Parents: Bernardo Rebolledo; Berta Salinas
- Motto: In verbo Tuo
- Coat of arms

Styles of René Rebolledo Salinas
- Reference style: The Most Reverend
- Spoken style: Your Excellency
- Religious style: Archbishop
- Posthumous style: not applicable

René Osvaldo Rebolledo Salinas (born 22 September 1958) is a Chilean Roman Catholic prelate who currently serves as the Archbishop of La Serena since his appointment by Pope Francis on 14 December 2013. He had previously served as Bishop of Osorno.

== Early life and education ==
René Osvaldo Rebolledo Salinas was born in Cunco, Chile, son of Bernardo Rebolledo and Berta Salinas. In March 1978, he entered Seminario Mayor San Fidel in San José de la Mariquina, Chile, where he studied philosophy and theology. He was ordained to the priesthood on August 25, 1984, by Bishop Sixto Parzinger Foidl, O.F.M., Cap., who then served as Vicar Apostolic of Araucanía which later became the Roman Catholic Diocese of Villarrica.

== Priesthood ==
After ordination, Rebolledo served at Immaculate Conception Parish in Loncoche, before commencing studies in Italy, where he earned a doctorate in theology. Returning to Chile, from 1990 to 2002, he was a professor and formator at Seminario Mayor San Fidel. From 1993 to 2002, he served as rector of the institution.

From 1994 to 2000, he served two terms as the president of Organization of Chilean Seminaries (Organización de Seminarios Chilenos, or OSCHI, for short), and he also served as a board member of the Latin American Organization for Seminaries (Organización Latinoamericana de Seminarios, or OSLAM).

In December 2002, Bishop Parzinger named him Vicar General of the newly erected Diocese of Villarrica. In January 2004 he also became rector of the cathedral.

== Episcopate ==
Pope John Paul II named Rebolledo the Bishop of Osorno on May 8, 2004. He was consecrated by Cardinal Francisco Javier Errázuriz Ossa, then the Archbishop of Santiago, on June 19, 2004.

In the Episcopal Conference of Chile, Rebolledo is the president of the Ecclesial Area, of the Episcopal Commission on Seminaries, and the National Liturgical Commission.

On December 14, 2013, Pope Francis named Rebolledo Archbishop of La Serena.

== See also ==
- Roman Catholicism in Chile

Catholic Church titles
Preceded by Alejandro Goic Karmelic	Bishop of Osorno; 19 June 2004–14 December 2013	Succeeded by vacant
Preceded by Manuel Gerardo Donoso Donoso, SS.CC.	Archbishop of La Serena; 14 December 2014–incumbent	Succeeded by incumbent
