= Diocese of San Felipe, Chile =

Roman Catholic diocese in Chile

Coordinates: 32.7514°S 70.7239°W

Diocese of San Felipe Dioecesis Sancti Philippi Diócesis de San Felipe

Catholic
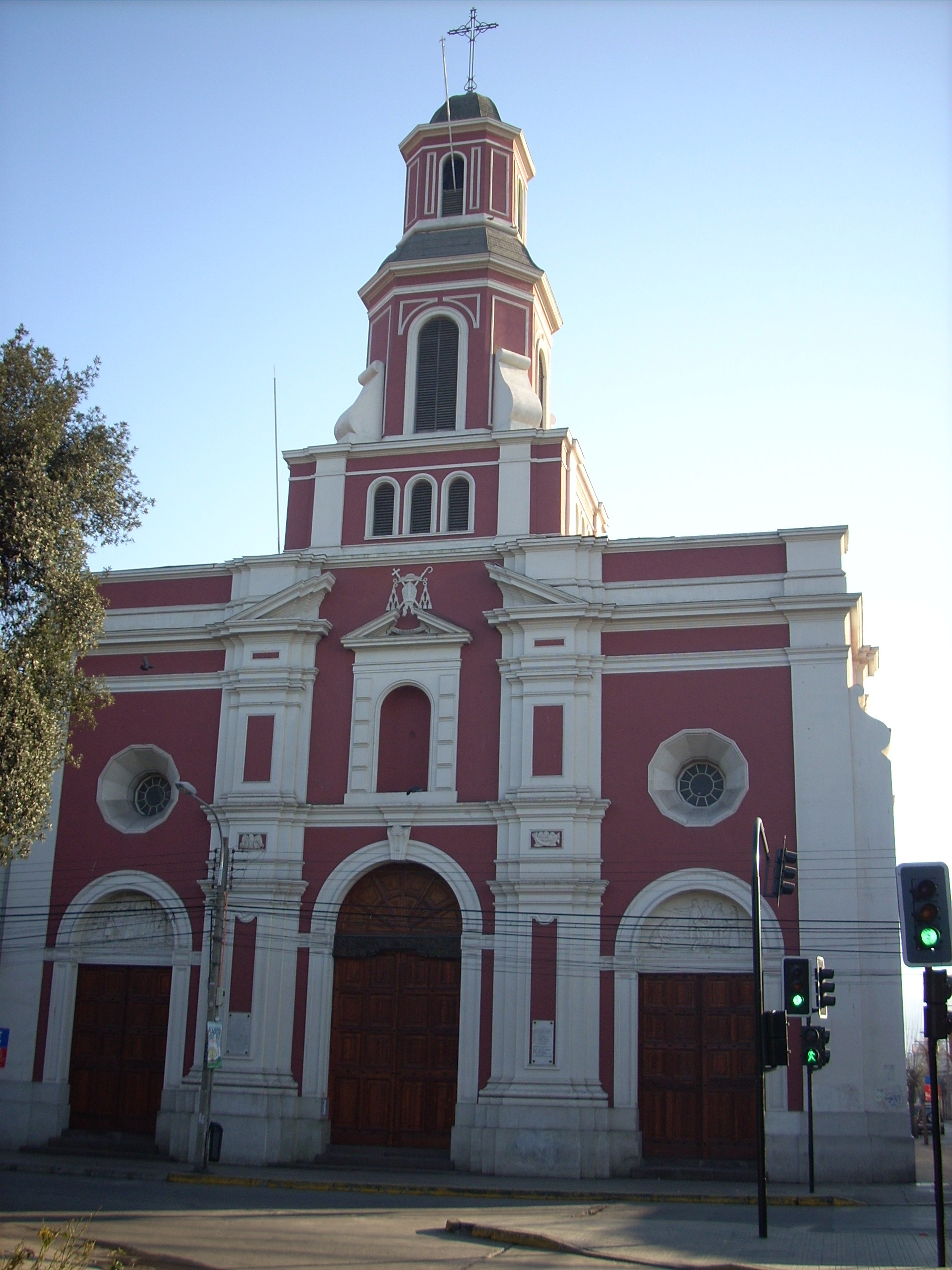
- Cathedral of St. Philip

Location
- Country: Chile
- Ecclesiastical province: Santiago de Chile
- Metropolitan: Santiago de Chile

Statistics
- Area: 10,223 km^{2} (3,947 sq mi)
- Population: Total; Catholics: (as of 2010); 337,000; 269,000 (79.8%)

Information
- Rite: Latin Rite
- Established: 18 October 1925 (101 years ago)
- Cathedral: Cathedral of St Philip in San Felipe
- Patron saint: St Philip the Apostle

Current leadership
- Pope: Leo XIV
- Bishop: Gonzalo Arturo Bravo Álvarez

Website
- https://www.diocesisdesanfelipe.cl

The Roman Catholic Diocese of San Felipe (Latin: Sancti Philippi) is a diocese located in the city of San Felipe in the ecclesiastical province of Santiago de Chile in Chile. The diocese was led by an apostolic administrator, Jaime Ortiz de Lazcano Piquer, from 21 September 2018 (when Pope Francis accepted the resignation of Bishop Cristián Contreras Molina, whom the Vatican had found innocent of charges of sexual abuse and who had had civil charges dropped for lack of evidence.) until 26 May 2020, when Gonzalo Arturo Bravo Álvarez was appointed the new Bishop (consecrated and installed on 13 August).

== History ==
- 18 October 1925: Established as Diocese of San Felipe from the Metropolitan Archdiocese of Santiago de Chile

== Leadership ==
- Bishops of San Felipe (Roman Rite), in reverse chronological order
  - Bishop Gonzalo Arturo Bravo Álvarez (26 May 2020 – present)
  - Bishop Cristián Contreras Molina, O. de M. (19 July 2002 – 21 September 2018)
  - Bishop Manuel Camilo Vial Risopatrón (20 December 1983 – 21 September 2001), appointed Bishop of Temuco
  - Archbishop (personal title) Francisco de Borja Valenzuela Ríos (25 March 1974 – 3 May 1983), appointed Archbishop (personal title) of Valparaíso
  - Bishop Enrique Alvear Urrutia (7 June 1965 – 9 February 1974)
  - Bishop José Luis Castro Cabrera (10 May 1963 – 26 January 1965)
  - Bishop Ramón Munita Eyzaguirre (23 November 1957 – 23 April 1963)
  - Bishop Roberto Benardino Berríos Gaínza, O.F.M. (19 March 1938 – 23 November 1957)
  - Bishop Melquisedec del Canto Terán (14 December 1925 – 19 March 1938)

== Sources ==
- GCatholic.org
- Catholic Hierarchy
- Diocese website
