= Diocese of San Bartolomé de Chillán =

Catholic ecclesiastical territory

Coordinates: 36.6068°S 72.1021°W

Diocese of San Bartolomé de Chillán Dioecesis Sancti Bartholomaie de Chillán Diócesis de San Bartolomé de Chillán

Catholic
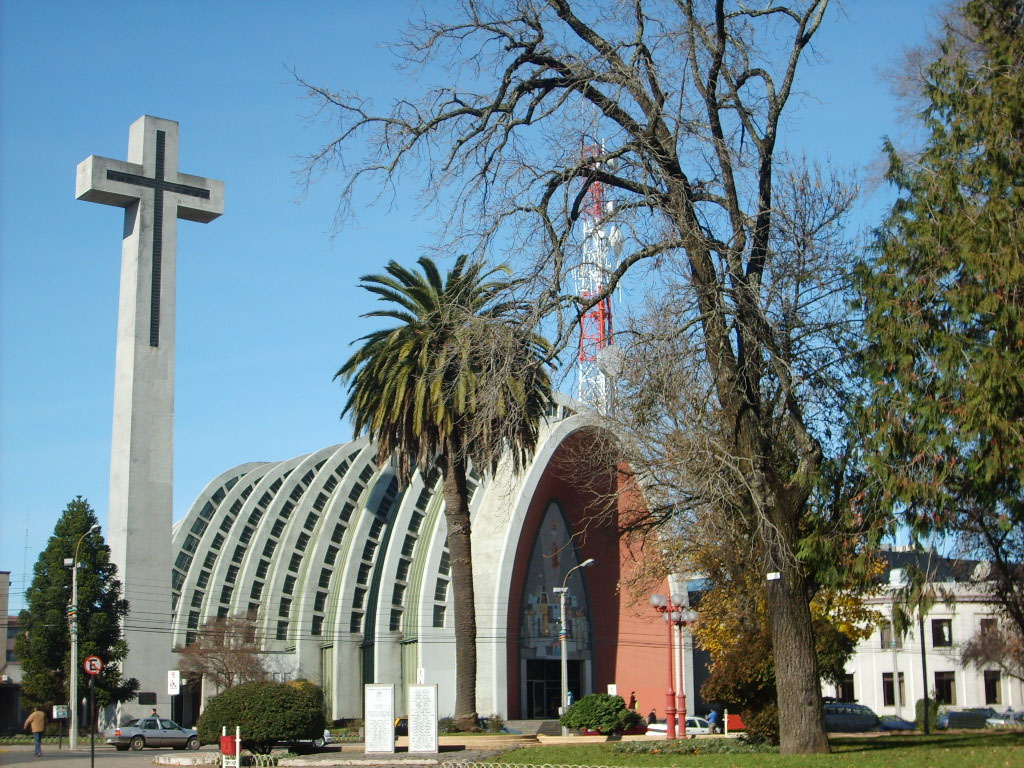
- Cathedral of St. Bartholomew

Location
- Country: Chile
- Ecclesiastical province: Concepción
- Metropolitan: Concepción

Statistics
- Area: 12,461 km^{2} (4,811 sq mi)
- Population: Total; Catholics: (as of 2006); 441,000; 304,000 (68.9%)

Information
- Rite: Latin Rite
- Established: 1916 (109–110 years ago)
- Cathedral: Cathedral St Bartholomew in Chillán
- Patron saint: St. Bartholomew the Apostle

Current leadership
- Pope: Leo XIV
- Bishop: Andrés Gabriel Ferrada Moreira
- Metropolitan Archbishop: Fernando Natalio Chomali Garib
- Bishops emeritus: Alberto Jara Franzoy, Carlos Pellegrín Barrera

Website
- Website of the Diocese

The Roman Catholic Diocese of San Bartolomé de Chillán (Latin: Sancti Bartholomaie de Chillán) is a diocese located in the city of Chillán in the ecclesiastical province of Concepción in Chile. (The diocese name was changed on 1 November 2017.)

== History ==
In 1916, Bishop Luis Enrique Izquierdo Vargas established the Mission “sui iuris” of Chillán from the Diocese of Concepción. On 18 October 1925, Pope Pius IX established the Diocese of Chillán out of the mission. In 1963, four parishes were transferred from the Diocese of Chillán to the Diocese of Linares. On 1 November 2017, the diocese was renamed San Bartolome de Chillán.

== Leadership ==
in reverse chronological order

Bishops of San Bartolome de Chillán

- Archbishop Andrés Gabriel Ferrada Moreira (31 October 2025 – present)
- Bishop Sergio Hernán Pérez de Arce Arriagada, SS.CC. (6 February 2020 – 16 May 2024)
- Bishop Carlos Pellegrín Barrera, S.V.D. (1 November 2017 – 21 September 2018)

Bishops of Chillán

- Bishop Carlos Pellegrín Barrera, S.V.D. (25 March 2006 – 1 November 2017)
- Bishop Alberto Jara Franzoy (30 April 1982 – 25 March 2006)
- Bishop Francisco José Cox Huneeus (14 December 1974 – 9 November 1981), appointed Coadjutor Archbishop of La Serena
- Bishop Eladio Vicuña Aránguiz (28 August 1955 – 16 July 1974), appointed Archbishop of Puerto Montt
- Bishop Jorge Larraín Cotapos (20 March 1937 – 10 August 1955)
- Bishop Martín Rucker Sotomayor (14 December 1925 – 6 January 1935)

Apostolic Administrators of Chillán

- Bishop Martín Rucker Sotomayor (16 March 1923 – 14 December 1925)
- Fr. Luis A. Venegas Henríquez (1922 – 1924)
- Fr. Zacarías Muñoz Henríquez (1920 – 1921)
- Bishop Reinaldo Muñoz Olave (1 March 1916 – 1920)

== Sources ==
- GCatholic.org
- Catholic Hierarchy
- Diocese website
