= Carlos Oviedo Cavada =

Chilean Cardinal of the Catholic Church

His Eminence Carlos Oviedo Cavada O. de M.
- Archbishop Emeritus of Santiago
- Church: Roman Catholic Church
- Archdiocese: Santiago
- See: Santiago
- Appointed: 30 March 1990
- Installed: 22 April 1990
- Term ended: 16 February 1998
- Predecessor: Juan Francisco Fresno Larraín
- Successor: Francisco Javier Errázuriz Ossa
- Other post: Cardinal-Priest pro hac vice of Santa Maria della Scala (1994–98)
- Previous posts: Titular Bishop of Beneventum (1964–74); Auxiliary Bishop of Concepción (1964–74); Apostolic Administrator of Calama (1974–76); Archbishop of Antofagasta (1974–90); President of the Chilean Bishops' Conference (1995–98); Apostolic Administrator of Santiago (1998)

Orders
- Ordination: 24 September 1949 by José María Caro Rodríguez
- Consecration: 7 June 1964 by Alfredo Silva Santiago
- Created cardinal: 26 November 1994 by Pope John Paul II
- Rank: Cardinal-Priest

Personal details
- Born: Carlos Oviedo Cavada; 19 January 1927 Santiago, Chile
- Died: 7 November 1998 (aged 71) Santiago, Chile
- Education: Pontifical Catholic University of Chile; Pontifical Gregorian University
- Motto: Pacem diebus nostris
- Coat of arms

Styles of Carlos Oviedo Cavada
- Reference style: His Eminence
- Spoken style: Your Eminence
- Religious style: Cardinal
- Informal style: Cardinal
- See: Santiago de Chile (emeritus)

Carlos Oviedo Cavada, O. de M. (19 January 1927 – 7 December 1998) was a Chilean Cardinal of the Catholic Church. He served as Archbishop of Santiago de Chile from 1990 to 1998, and was elevated to the cardinalate in 1994.

== Biography ==
Cavada was born in Santiago, and entered the Order of Mercy on 28 January 1944, taking simple vows on 18 March 1945 and solemn vows on 19 March 1948. He entered the Pontifical Catholic University of Chile. He was ordained on 24 September 1949 in Santiago and later went on to study at the Pontifical Gregorian University in Rome from 1949 to 1953 where he earned a doctorate in canon law.

He was a faculty member and spiritual director at St. Peter Nolasco School and after that a faculty member at the Pontifical Catholic University of Chile from 1953 until 1958. From 1958 until 1961 he worked in the general curia of his order and pursued further studies in the Vatican Secret Archives.

Pope Paul VI appointed him titular bishop of Benevento and Auxiliary Bishop of Concepción on 21 March 1964. He attended the Second Vatican Council from 1964 until the close of the council in 1965. He was promoted to the metropolitan see of Antofagasta in 1974. He was transferred to the metropolitan see of Santiago de Chile on 30 March 1990.

He was created Cardinal Priest of S. Maria della Scala in the consistory of 26 November 1994 by Pope John Paul II. He resigned as Archbishop of Santiago de Chile on 16 February 1998, but continued governing the archdiocese as Apostolic Administrator until a successor took possession in April of that year. He died in December.

Catholic Church titles
Preceded by Juan Francisco, Fresno	Archbishop of Santiago de Chile; 30 March 1990 – 16 February 1998	Succeeded by Francisco Javier Errázuriz Ossa
