= Sacred Heart Cathedral, Punta Arenas =

Coordinates: 53.1620°S 70.9090°W

Sacred Heart Cathedral
- Catedral del Sagrado Corazón
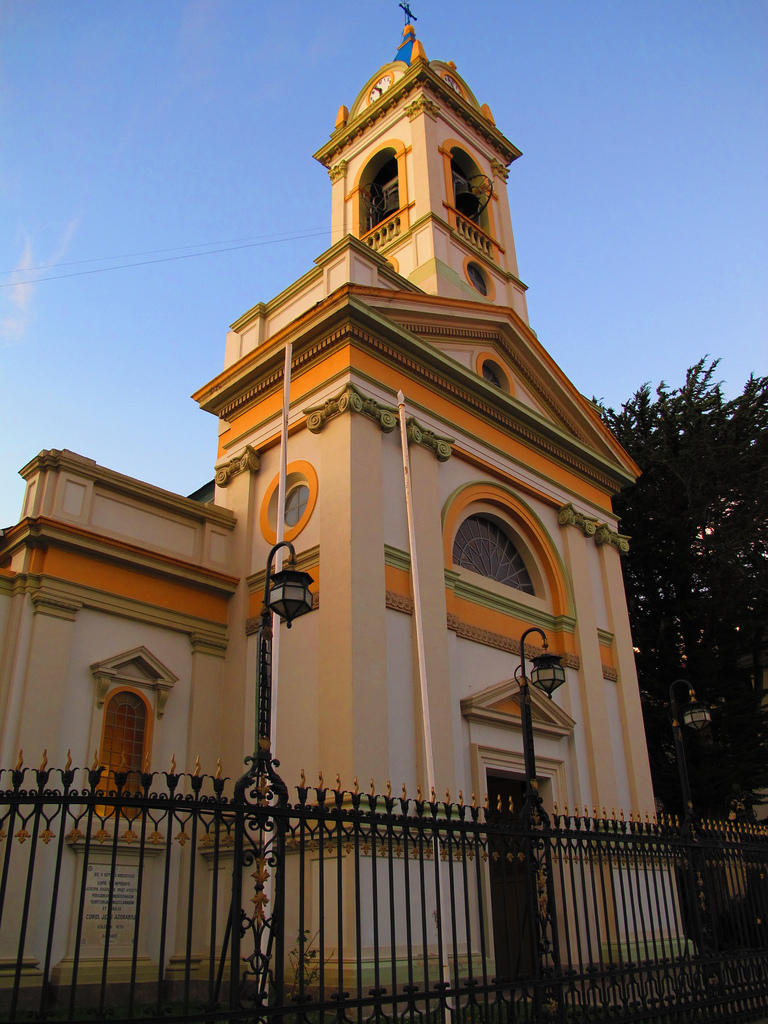
- Sacred Heart Cathedral
- Location: Punta Arenas
- Country: Chile
- Denomination: Roman Catholic Church
- Sui iuris church: Latin Church

History
- Status: Cathedral
- Founded: 1892
- Dedicated: Sacred Heart of Jesus
- Consecrated: December 4, 1977

Architecture
- Functional status: Active
- Architect: Juan Bernabé
- Architectural type: Ionic order
- Years built: 1892-1901
- Groundbreaking: December 28, 1892
- Completed: June 1, 1901

Administration
- Archdiocese: Archdiocese of Puerto Montt
- Diocese: Roman Catholic Diocese of Punta Arenas

Clergy
- Archbishop: Luis Fernando Ramos Pérez
- Bishop: Óscar Hernán Blanco Martínez

The Sacred Heart Cathedral Cathedral (Spanish: Catedral del Sagrado Corazón) also called Punta Arenas Cathedral and Sacred Heart of Jesus Parish, is a religious building of the Catholic Church which has a Renaissance tower that is dedicated to the order of the Salesians. Its construction began on December 28, 1892, on the plans made by the Father of the Salesian order Juan Bernabe. It is located in the city of Punta Arenas in the region of Magallanes and Chilean Antarctica in the South American country of Chile.

In 1584 a first temple was built. On December 28, 1892, the construction of the new church began. It would mark a milestone in the area, and would use the brick. Its interior is a basilica style with three naves Romanesque and divided by Corinthian columns is 46 meters long, 18 wide and 30.60 high. The bell tower was raised in 1898, and measures 30 meters to the cross.

On February 26, 1984, it was on the outskirts of the Cathedral of Punta Arenas where General Augusto Pinochet lived one of the first protests against him. When Pinochet was ready to receive military honors in front of the town square a crowd stood on the sidewalk of the cathedral shouting slogans against him.

== See also ==
- Roman Catholicism in Chile
- Sacred Heart Cathedral (disambiguation)

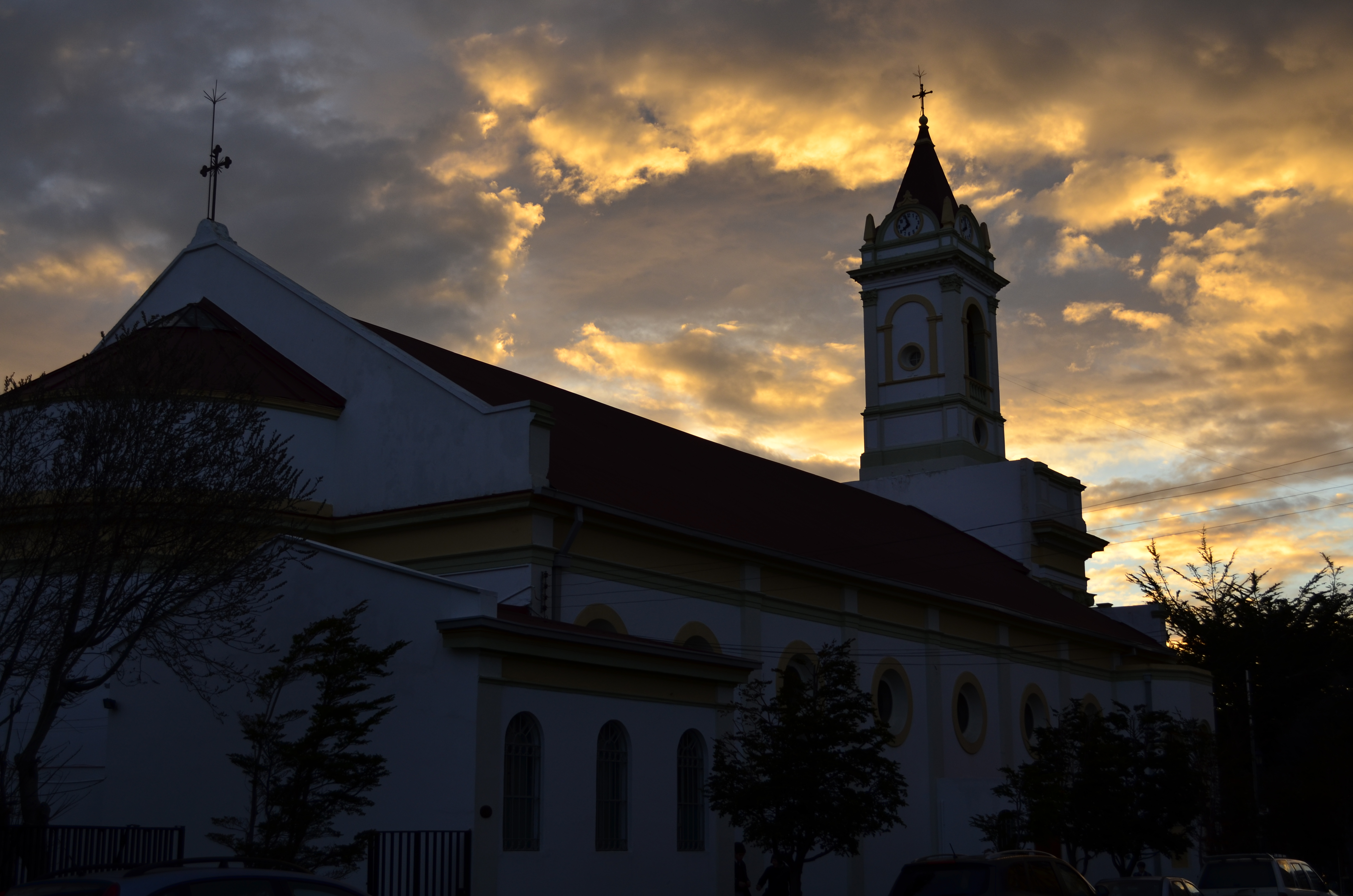
Another view
