= Valeria, Spain (Roman city) =

Cultural property in Las Valeras, Spain

Valeria
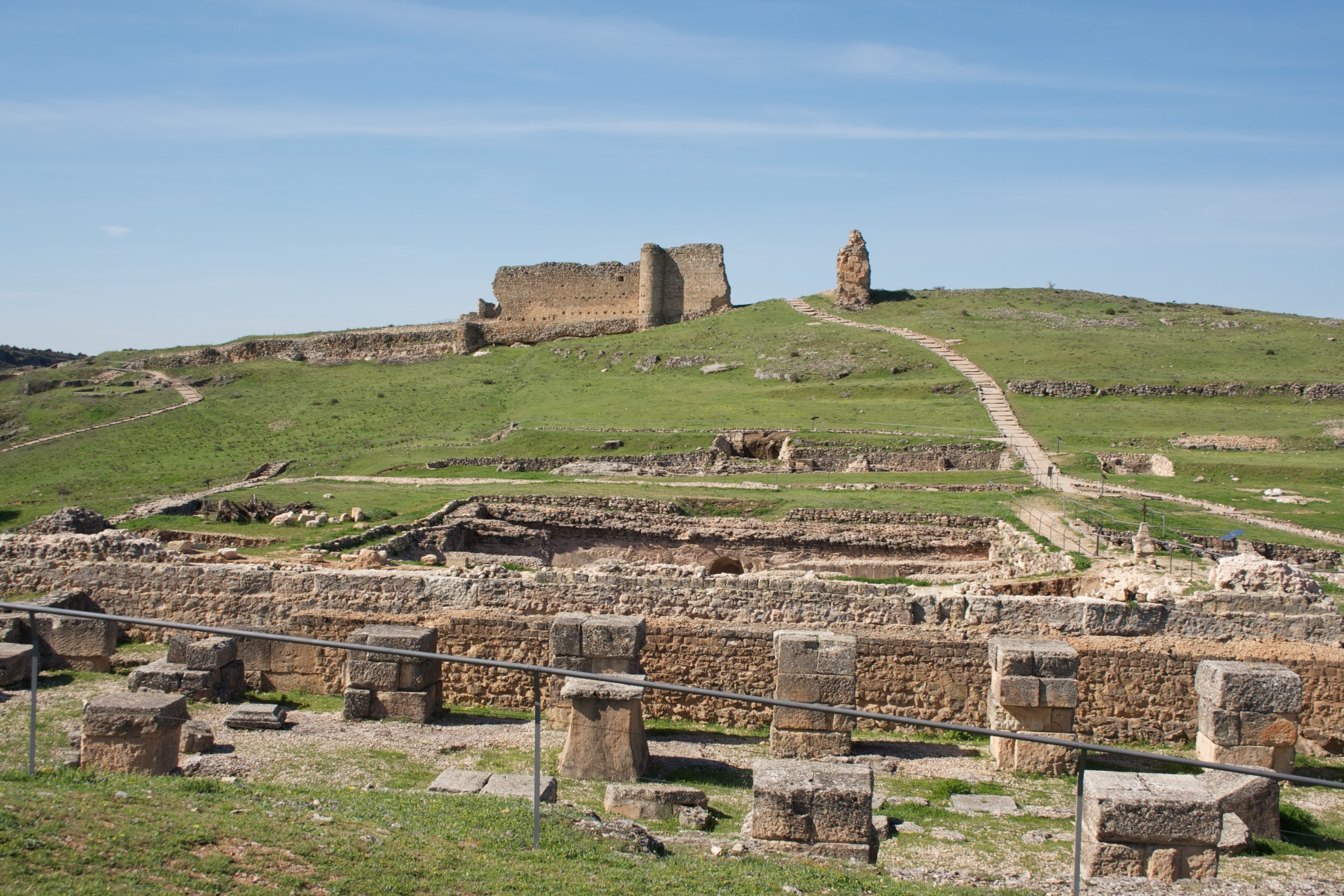
- The Roman city

- Location within Spain
- 39.8083°N 2.1503°W
- Location: Spain
- Region: Castile–La Mancha

Valeria was an important Roman city and one of the three major cities (with Segobriga and Ercavica) in the modern province of Cuenca.

Its impressive ruins are located on a spectacular site near the modern town of Valeria (Cuenca, Castilla-La Mancha).

== History ==
Valeria was founded on land conquered from the celtiberians, between 93 and 82 BC when Valerius Flaccus became proconsul of Hispania Citerior, since when it has preserved the name that refers to its founder.

== Site ==
Valeria is located on a tongue of land between limestone gorges at an altitude of a 1000 metres.

Excavation began in the 1950s, but more scientifically since 1974. Since then, systematic excavations have focussed primarily on the space occupied by the forum as well as on private villas.

The major urban development of Valeria dates to the 1st century AD, when construction of the forum was undertaken. The centre of the site comprises a series of public buildings around an immense square platform in the centre of which the forum stood. It is one of the most complete Roman fora situated on a platform. Built into the platform are cisterns to store rainwater collected from above.

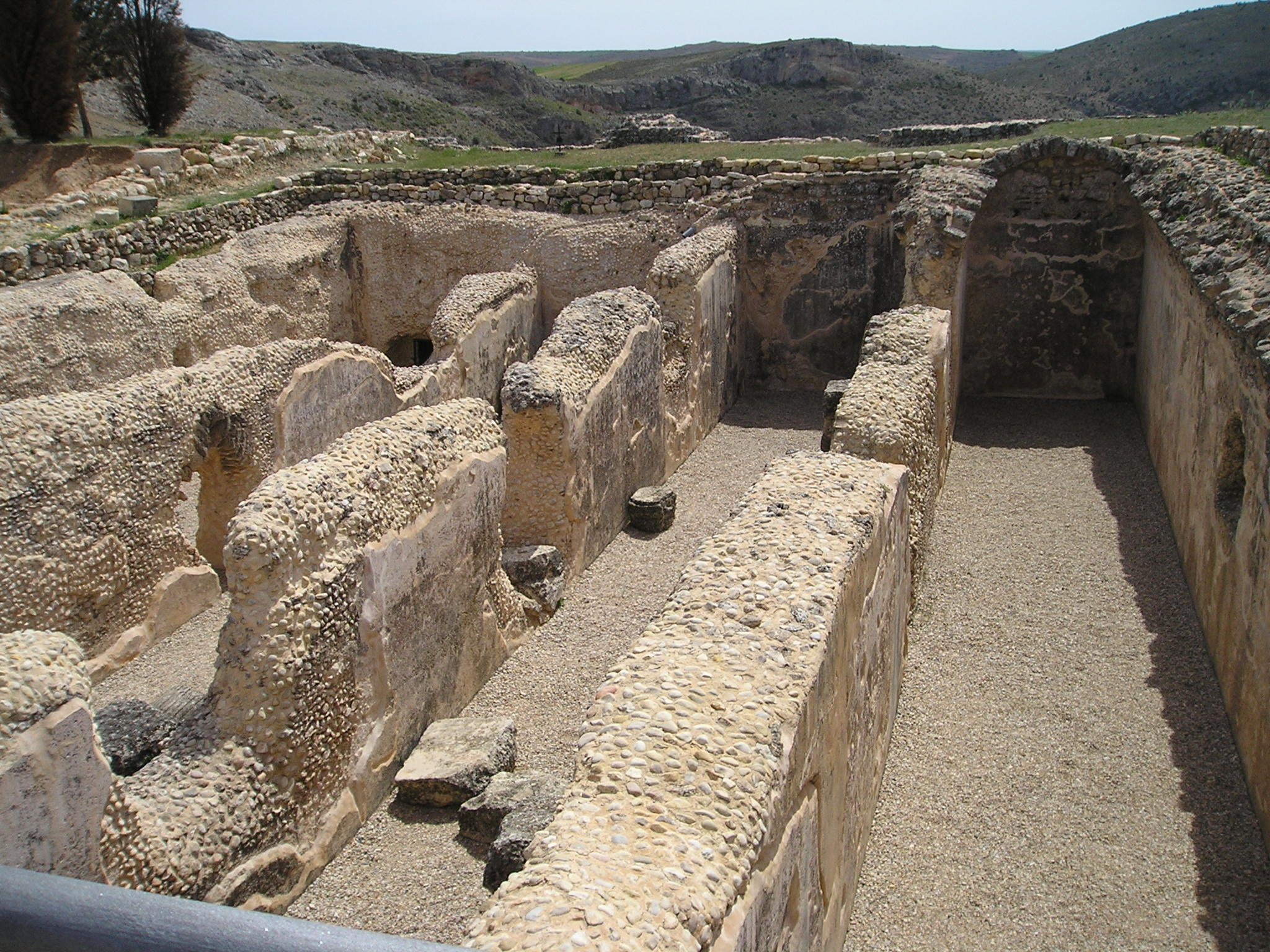
Cisterns built under the forum to collect and store rainwater under Claudius

The Basilica is located to the north side of the forum while on the west side are the Exedra (Hall of the imperial cult) and Cryptoporticus, a vaulted underground gallery functioning as a street or storerooms that also served as foundation to the floor of the Exedra and which occupies the whole side of the platform from the Basilica to the southern limit of the Forum. To the south lies a monumental staircase to the forum, a series of shops and the most iconic building of Valeria, the Nymphaeum, over 100 metres long. The ensemble is bounded by streets. The extent and status of the remains indicate that it was a Municipium.

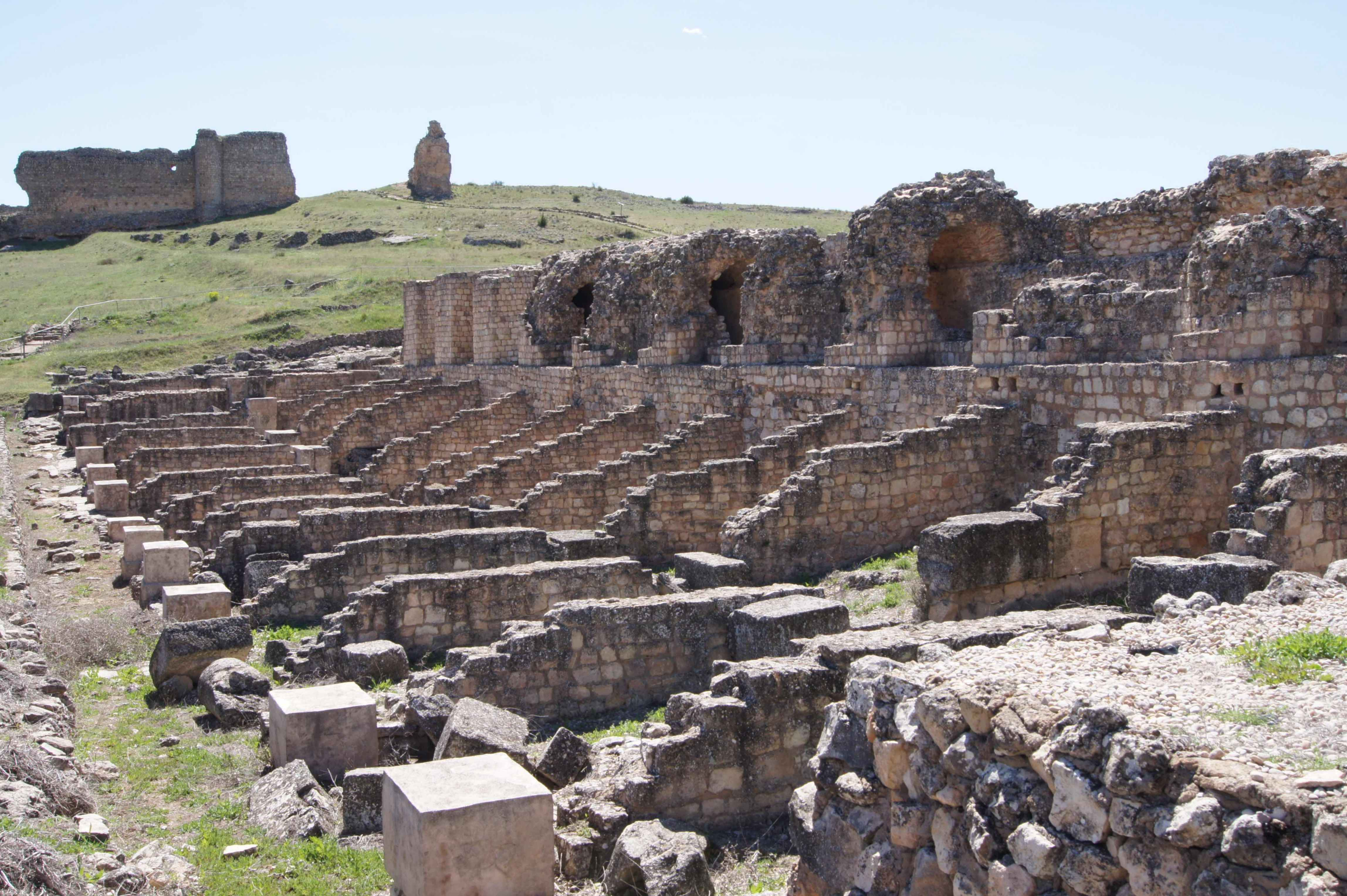
The Nympheum (foreground) and shops

=== The Nymphaeum ===
On the east side of the forum lies this very original fountain building dedicated to the nymphs and rivers. It is very large at over 105m long of which more than 80 belong to the fountain proper. This makes it one of the largest known throughout the Roman Empire and, of course, the largest in Hispania. The Nymphaeum did not perhaps figure in the first, late-republican, forum and was perhaps devised when forum was raised in level in the remodelling of the first century AD in the Claudius era. It is, however, a very old example since its construction must date from the early years of the 1st c. AD, and therefore well before the great nymphaea of Africa (2nd c. AD) so that Valeria is closer to the older Hellenistic types.

The hillside fell abruptly on this side of the Forum and it was necessary to build a high retaining wall which would have compromised its aesthetic appearance. Therefore the designer of the forum took advantage of this wall to create a shrine to water gods, typical in the celtibérian world. In front of the wall, decorated with rectangular niches and alcoves, shops were built at the foot of the retaining wall. Their roofs served as part of an elongated terrace at a lower floor level of the Forum and divided into two halves, one like a large balcony supporting the retaining wall on the rear and providing a view over all the city, and the other half covered and attached to nymphaeum.

A longitudinal gallery ran along the back of the terrace containing a channel connected to the tanks of the city so that water flowing from the channel came out of mouths in niches that decorated the wall. In them would be statues or paintings and water was channelled to ornate fountains below. The water supply and recuperation circuit must have been a remarkable work of hydraulic engineering, of which little remains.

The Nympeum is undoubtedly the most emblematic monument of Valeria and one of the best known and most iconic of Hispania.

By the 4th century AD the Nymphaeum fell out of use and was perhaps damaged. The area was re-occupied by rather modest private houses and partially dismantled, later to be used as a quarry.

=== The Exedra ===
During the first phase of occupation of the Exedra, the cryptoporticus was connected to the ground floor of the building through doors. The Exedra was accessed at street level through two doors located in the east walls of the building from the Cardo (the north-south street) which runs parallel to the building. The exedra underwent various modifications or re-uses in its life. In the 2nd century AD in one of the renovations the doors to the cryptoporticus were blocked up and, after the Forum became ruined and abandoned as a public space in the 3rd century, the exedra was re-occupied as a private dwelling in the 4th century. At this time the debris from the collapse of the building was not removed so it was necessary to build stairs for access to the ground floor of the building, possibly the only space that could be inhabited. Also in this phase they divided up some areas; walls were rebuilt and door openings between rooms modified.

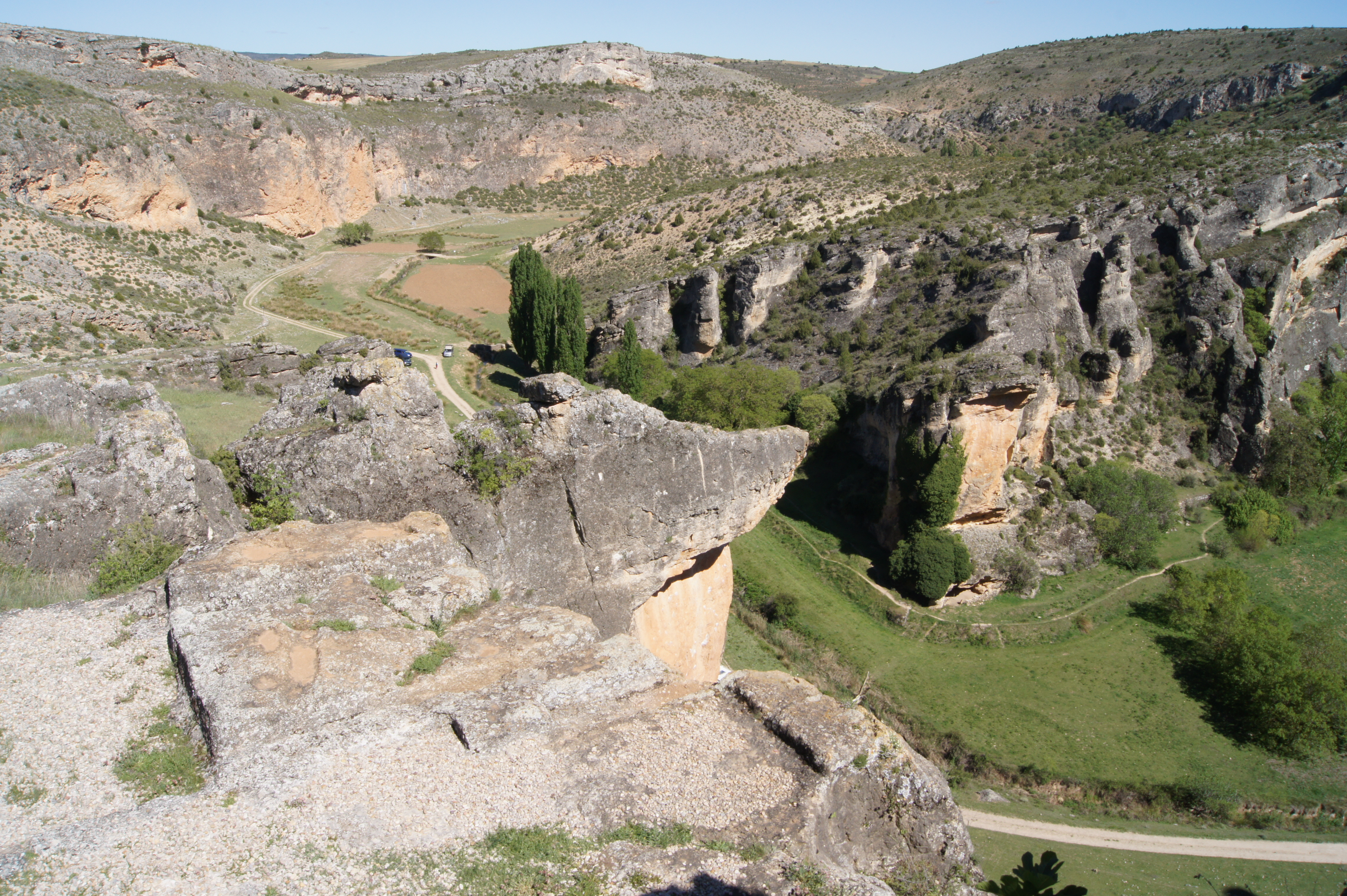
View from villa

=== Other Buildings ===
On the southern side of the Forum structures is the House of the Adobe. Another example of private urbanism is the "Casa del Hoyo".

The Roman city had a good water supply through an articulated system of aqueducts that can be seen carved into the rock.

The objects found at this site are in the museum of Cuenca, including the treasure of Valeria consisting of silver coins dating from the period after the Second Punic War in about 185 BC.
