= Segobriga =

Human settlement in Spain

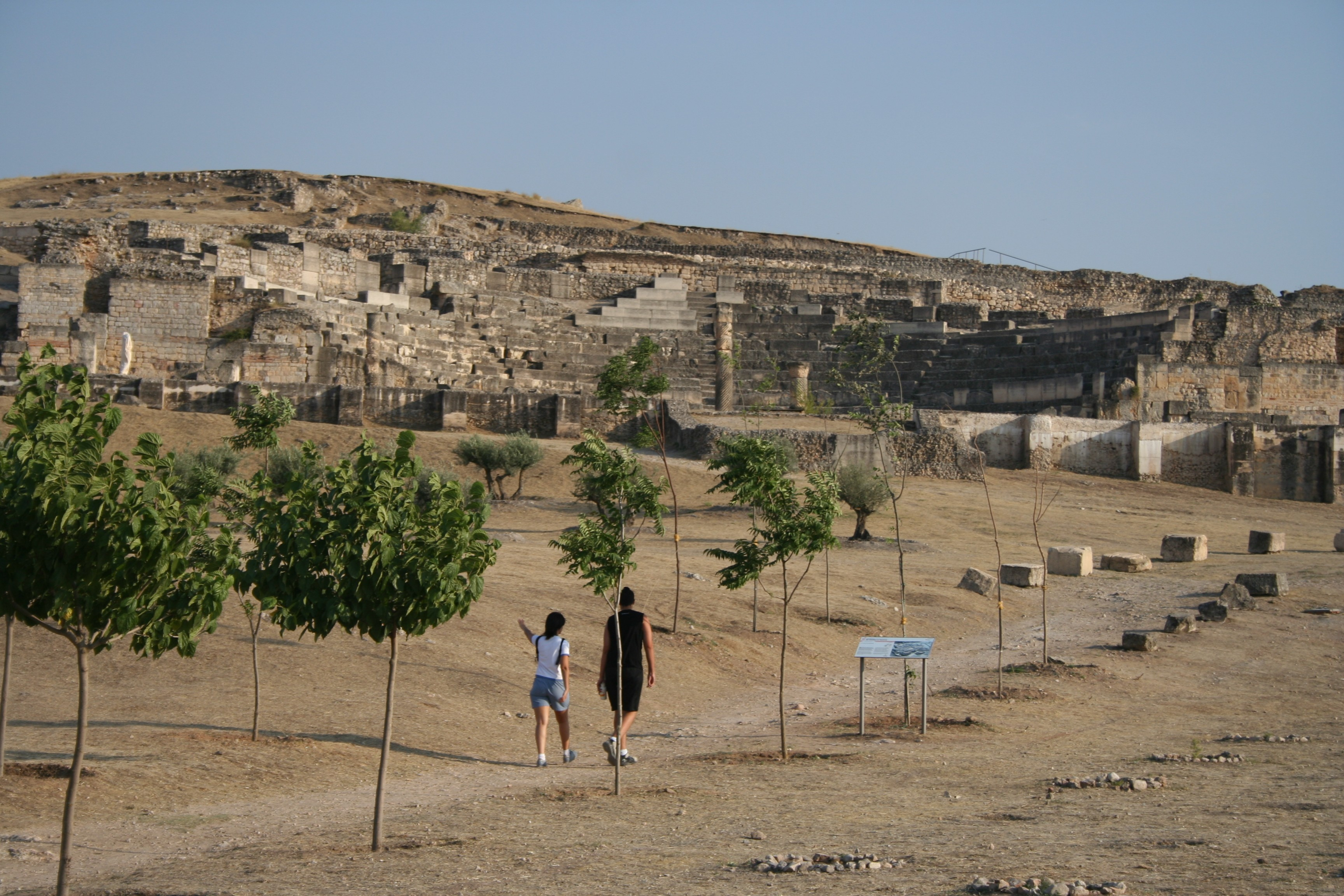

- Location within Spain
- 39.885°N 2.813°W
- Location: Spain
- Region: Castile–La Mancha

Segóbriga was an important Celtic and Roman city, and is today an impressive site located on a hill (cerro Cabeza de Griego) near the present town of Saelices. Research has revealed remains of important buildings, which have since been preserved and made visible in the Archaeological Park. It was declared a National Monument on June 3, 1931, and is now considered cultural heritage under the official denomination Bien de Interés Cultural which comes with extensive legal protections.

Although the city is in ruins, its state of conservation is more than acceptable in comparison with remains elsewhere in the peninsula. A tour of the site offers an idea of what life was like in ancient cities.

== Toponymy ==
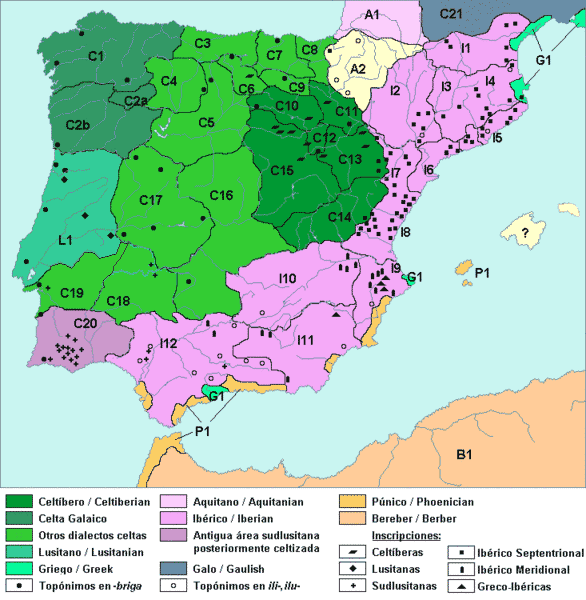
Celtiberian language. Places with place names in -briga

The name Segóbriga originates from two terms of the Celtiberian language, an extinct subset of the Indo-European Celtic branch. Sego- means victory, and this prefix also present in the name of the cities Segovia, Segorbe, Segeda and Segontia; and the suffix -briga, may broadly mean city or fortress. This suffix appears in other toponyms from the Celtiberian region, for example, Juliobriga.

The name's translation would be something approximating "Victory City" or "Triumphant Fortress".

== History ==
Plan of the main buildings

In the year 1888, a collective burial ground from the Bronze Age (more precisely, 2nd millennium BC) was found in a cave. The cave is known as cueva de Segóbriga, near the cerro de Cabeza de Griego, and it was excavated in limestone. The tombs belonged to a celtiberian settlement. This finding was published in the year 1893. Both human remains and common tools and supplies were discovered.

It is hypothesised that it was initially a celtiberian castro (fortress) that dominated the basin located north of the city, with the defensive advantage of the Cigüela river which served as a moat. Remains of the fortress have not appeared, but a ceramics fragment from 5th century BC Attica provides testimony of the area being populated that much earlier.

The first recorded mention of Segóbriga is a brief reference by Greek geographer Strabo, stating that Quintus Caecilius Metellus Pius fought in the Wars of Sertorius, in the Celtiberian region around Bílbilis and Segóbriga. This places the city right in the middle of Celtiberian territory. This ancient area belonging to the Olcade tribe was thus pillaged in the aforementioned wars and replaced by Roman Segóbriga.

It is thanks to some 3rd and 2nd century BC texts that we know to call the inhabitants of the area towards the Cuenca mountain chains Olcades, those approaching La Alcarria and the province of Guadalajara, Lusones, and toward Toledo, Carpetani. Therefore, the inhabitants of the area and the old city would be Olcades or Carpetani. 7 km away there isVillas Viejas, an archaeological site associated with the Contrebia Carbica, a Carpetani city.

Writing in the first century AD, Sextus Julius Frontinus mentions Segóbriga twice. He describes the attack by the Lusitanian Viriathus against Segóbriga (146 BC) which was allied to Rome:

1) "Viriathus, arranging his troops in ambush, sent a few to steal cattle from the Segobrigenses; they like to go in large numbers to punish, they ran, fleeing ..."

2) "Viriathus turned back and ran into unsuspecting Segobrigenses, when most were busy at their sacrifice".

Pliny the Elder mentions the exploitation of lapis specularis, a variety of translucent gypsum much appreciated at the time for the manufacture of window glass and an important part of the Segobriga economy. This material was mined in "100,000 places around Segóbriga" and Pliny assures us that "the most translucent of this stone is obtained near the city of Segóbriga and extracted from deep wells".

Pliny the Elder in his Naturalis Historia, in section 3.24, lists the towns belonging to the Caesaraugustan Conventus, among which they appear the Ercavicenses (of the city of Ercavica, neighbors of the Segobrigans). Later he defines Segóbriga and its area as caput Celtiberiae ('head of Celtiberia'), which reached to Clunia (finis celtiberiae), following a geographical order from the South to the North, which suggests, together with the previous data, that the Segóbriga zone was the boundary between the Celtiberians and the Carpetanis. He also indicates that Segóbriga was a stipendiary (tributary) city of that Conventus.

Later, in book 36 of his Naturalis Historia Pliny mentions the exploitation of lapis specularis, a variety of translucent specular gypsum that was very popular at the time for the manufacture of window glass and that would be for a long time an important part of Segóbriga's economy. This mineral was extracted from mines found in "100,000 steps around Segóbriga," and Pliny assures us that "the most translucent of this stone is obtained in the Hispania Citerior, near the city of Segóbriga and extracted from deep wells." One of these mines can be found in the nearby village of Carrascosa del Campo, which also had a manufacturing and mining enclave in service in this municipality.

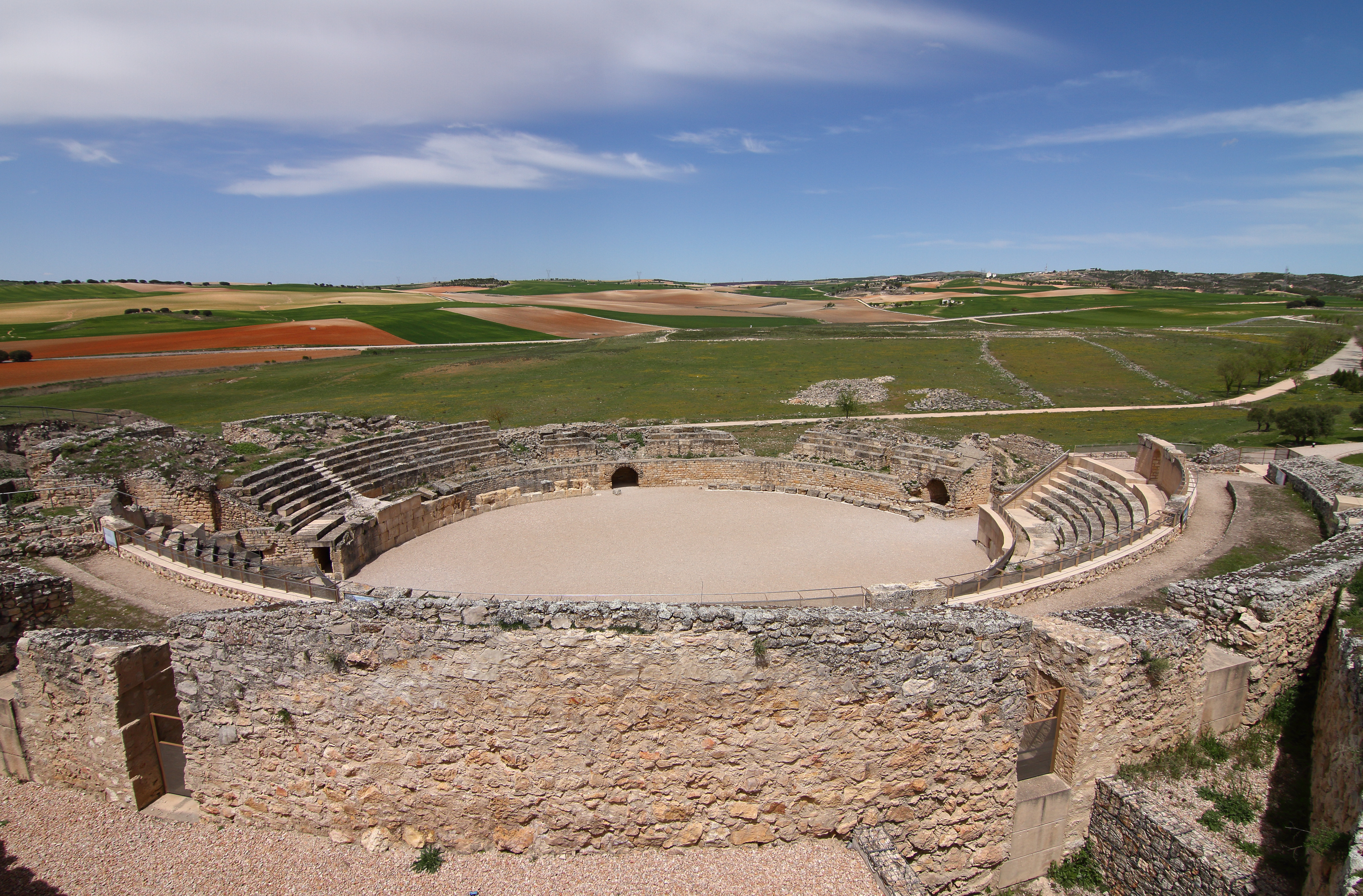
Amphitheater of Segóbriga, 75m long and of an irregular elliptic shape, is the biggest monument of Segóbriga and had capacity for 5,500.

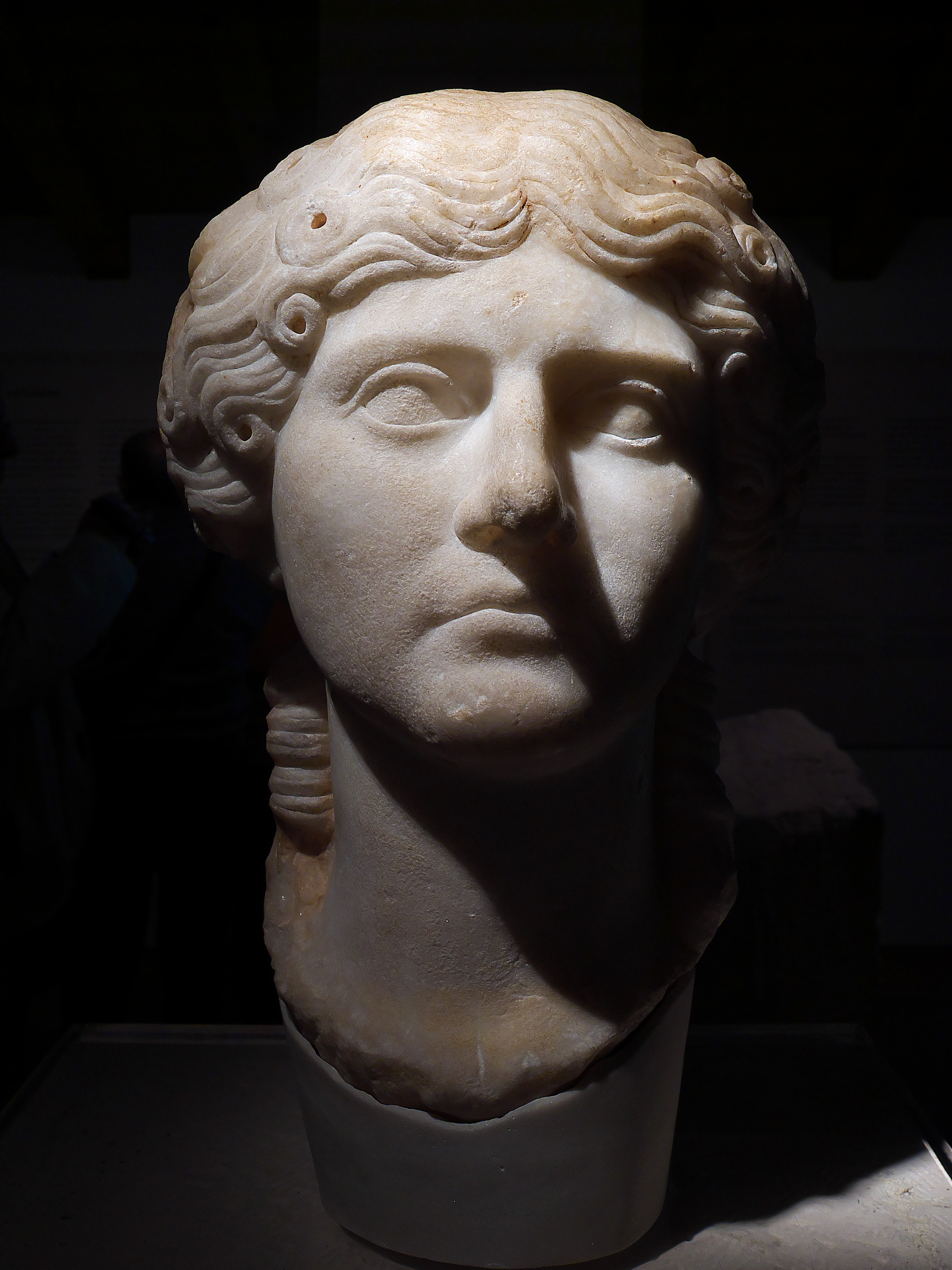
Agrippina the Elder in Segóbriga

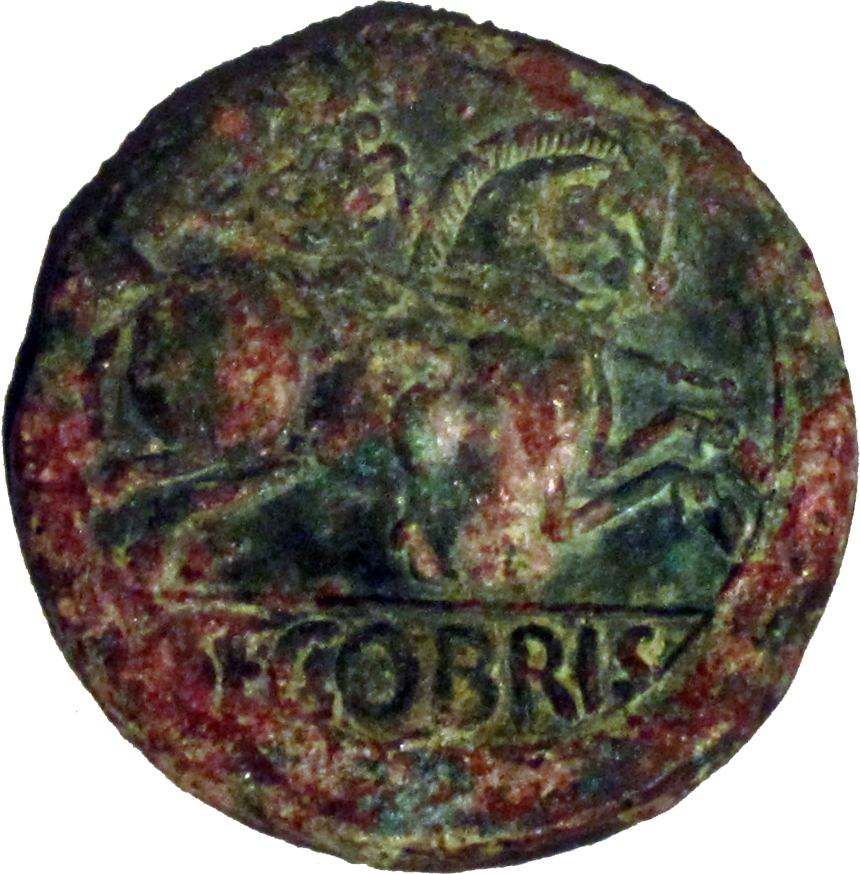
As of the Segobriga mint.

After its Roman conquest at the beginning of 2nd BC, in the Celtiberian Wars, Segóbriga became an oppidum or Celtiberian city. After the wars of Sertorius, among 80s and 72 BC, it became the center of all that part of the Meseta Central, with the control of a large territory.

In the time of Augustus, around year 12 BC, it ceased to be a stipendiary city which paid tribute to Rome, and became a municipium, a city ruled by Roman citizens, increasing the status of the city notably, leading to its economic boom and a large program of monumental constructions that must have ended in flavian epoch, towards 80, to which public leisure buildings and the wall that can be admired today. The city was an important communications center. From this time is also the issue of currency in its mint and the construction of a part of the wall. At the end of the mandate of Vespasian, the city was at its highest point, having completed the works of the theater and amphitheater, and being fully integrated socially and economically in the Roman Empire.

Archaeological findings indicate that in the 3rd century there still existed in Segóbriga important elites who lived in the city, but in the 4th century had already abandoned their main monuments, proof of its inexorable decline and its progressive conversion in a rural center.

At the Visigoth time, as of the 5th century, it still was an important city, since remains of several basilicas and an extensive necropolis are known (according to findings of 1760 - 1790), its bishops arriving to attend various Councils of Toledo, specifically to the Third Council of Toledo in year 589, and the Sixteenth Council of Toledo in 693.

Its definitive depopulation had to begin after the Muslim invasion of the Iberian Peninsula, when its bishops and governing elites fled towards the north, looking for the shelter of the Christian kingdoms, as it is known that it happened in the neighboring city of Ercavica (Cañaveruelas, Province of Cuenca). From these dates are the remains of a Muslim fortification that occupies the summit of the hill.

After the Reconquista, the population of the contours moved to the current town of Saelices, located 3 km further north, next to the fountain that nourished the aqueduct that had supplied the ancient city of Segóbriga. Forgotten and to its name, the hill that it occupied happened to be denominated "Cabeza del Griego", with a small rural population dependent on the town of Uclés, located to only 10 km, coming to use ashlars extracted of the ruins for the construction of its convent-fortress.

Since then its gradual abandonment was accentuated until only the small hermitage built on the ancient Monumental Baths remained, the last testimony of the ancient city preserved until the present time.

== Conservation ==
The landscape of the Archaeological Park of Segóbriga is threatened by the upcoming construction of a wind farm nearby, promoted by the company Energías Eólicas de Cuenca. The deposit will be altered with the installation of 14 wind turbines of 121 meters in height that will also affect the Historic Site of Uclés. This fact has led to the entrance of the Segóbriga Archaeological Park, together with the Historical Site of Uclés in the Red list of endangered heritage of the association for the defense of heritage Hispania Nostra.

== Current Segóbriga constructions ==
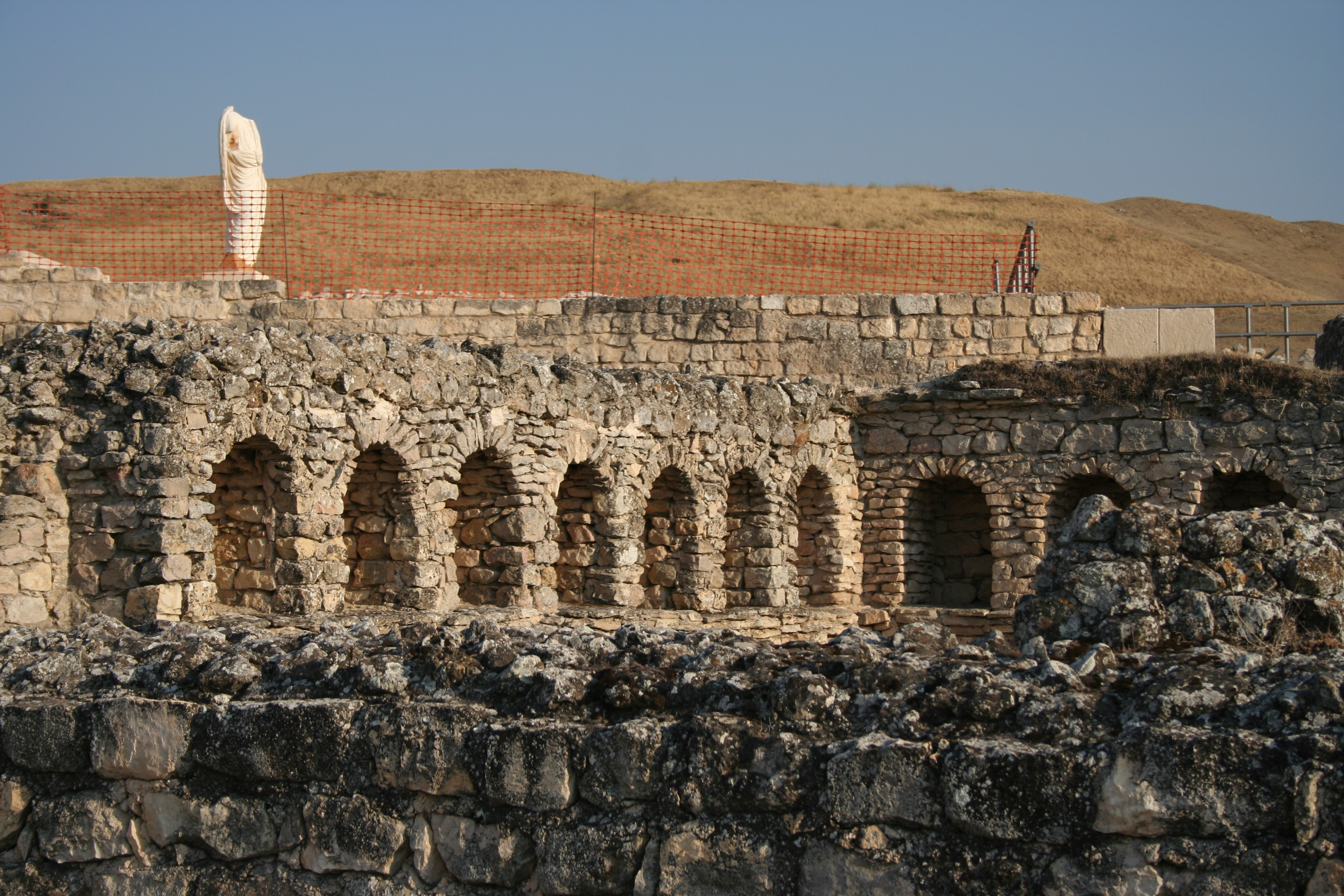
Roman Baths: The monumental baths were not only for hygienic reasons but also for social and business purposes.

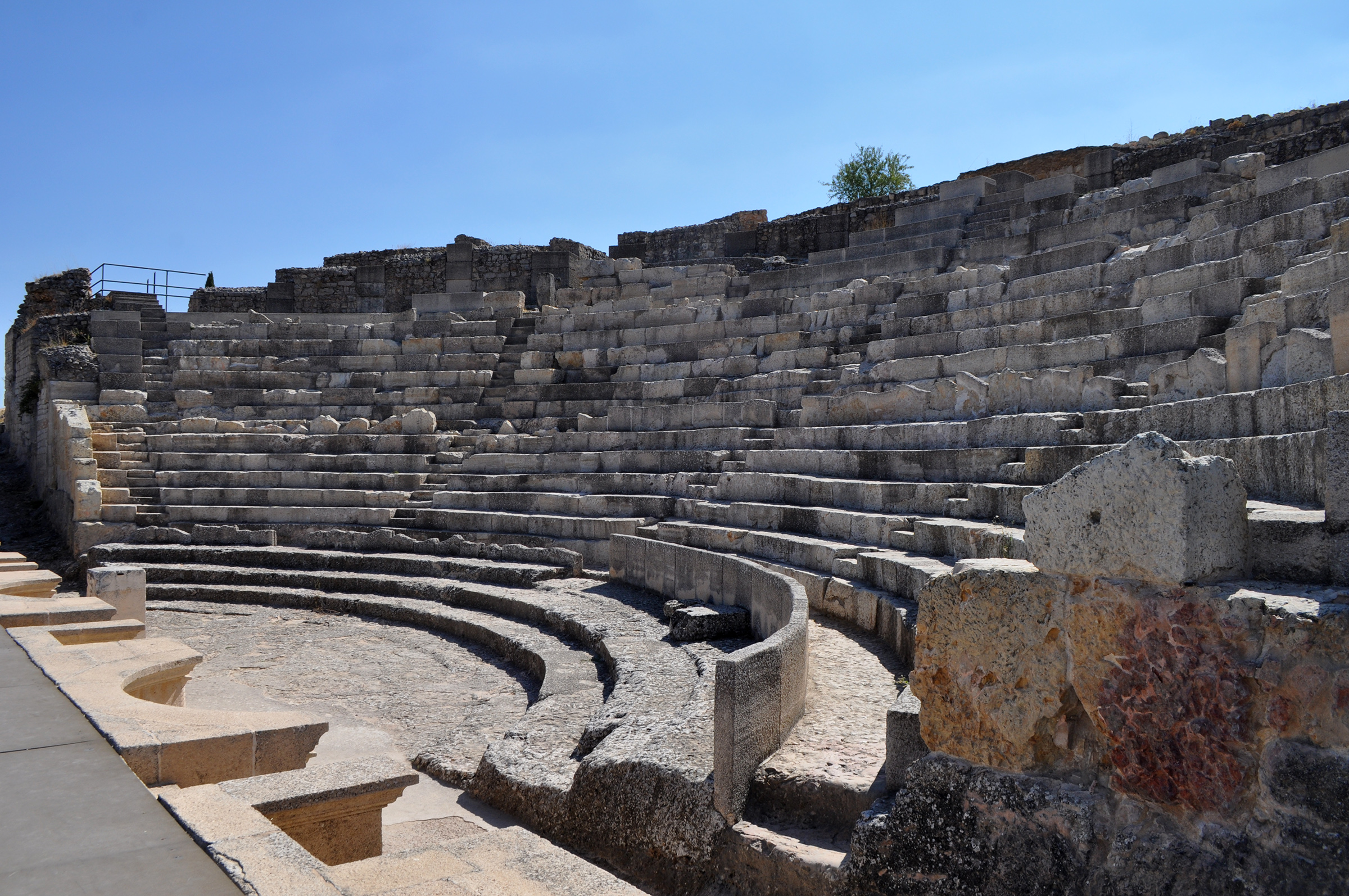
Segóbriga Theater: The Theatre was built in the first century. The orchestra had three tiers of seats for VIP's and is preserved together with seats for spectators divided into sections according to their social classes. The upper cavea was built on the city wall on a vault over a street

=== Celtiberians ===
- The necropolis (outside walls).

=== Romans ===
- The wall and the North Gate
- Amphitheater of Segóbriga
- Theater
- The Monumental Thermaes
- the theater's gym and thermae
- Forum
- The Acropolis
- The rock sanctuary of Diana (outside walls)
- The aqueduct (outside walls)
- The quarries (outside walls)
- The circus (outside walls): The most recent investigations have determined that this construction was built on a necropolis, but that it never came to an end.

=== Visigoths ===
- The basilica of Cabeza de Griego (outside walls)

== See also ==
- Archaeological Park of Segóbriga
- Antonio Tavira y Almazán
