= Tomás Osvaldo González Morales =

Chilean bishop (1935–2022)

- S.D.B.
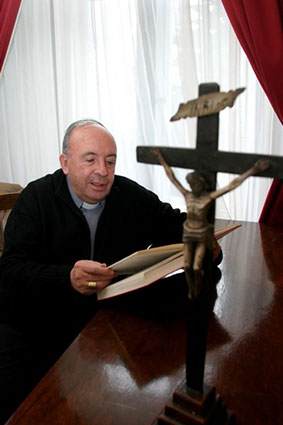
- Church: Catholic Church
- Diocese: Diocese of Punta Arenas
- In office: 28 March 1974 – 4 March 2006
- Predecessor: Vladimiro Boric Crnosija
- Successor: Bernardo Miguel Bastres Florence

Orders
- Ordination: 11 February 1963 by Maurilio Fossati
- Consecration: 27 April 1974 by Raúl Silva Henríquez

Personal details
- Born: 20 April 1935 Santiago, Chile
- Died: 12 February 2022 (aged 86) Punta Arenas, Magallanes Region, Chile

Tomás Osvaldo González Morales (20 April 1935 – 12 February 2022) was a Chilean Roman Catholic bishop.

== Biography ==
González Morales was born in Chile on 20 April 1935. He was ordained to the priesthood in 1963, before serving as bishop of the Roman Catholic Diocese of Punta Arenas, Chile, from 1974 until his retirement in 2006.

González Morales died from COVID-19 in Punta Arenas on 12 February 2022, at the age of 86, during the COVID-19 pandemic in Chile.
