= Cristián Caro Cordero =

Chilean archbishop

- Archbishop Emeritus of Puerto Montt
- Church: Catholic Church
- Appointed: 27 February 2001
- Retired: 11 June 2018
- Predecessor: Savino Bernardo Maria Cazzaro Bertollo
- Successor: Luis Fernando Ramos Pérez
- Previous posts: Titular Bishop of Arcavica (1991-2001); Auxiliary Bishop of Santiago de Chile (1991-2001)

Orders
- Ordination: 23 December 1973 by Raúl Silva Henríquez
- Consecration: 14 April 1991 by Carlos Oviedo Cavada

Personal details
- Born: 16 February 1943 (age 83) Santiago, Chile

Cristián Caro Cordero (born 16 February 1943) is a Chilean prelate of the Catholic Church who was Archbishop of Puerto Montt from 2001 to June 2018.

== Biography ==
He was ordained a priest by Cardinal Raúl Silva Henríquez on 23 December 1973. On 13 March 1991, Pope John Paul II named him titular bishop of Arcavica and Auxiliary Bishop of Santiago. He received his episcopal consecration from Carlos Oviedo Cavada on 14 April. John Paul appointed him Archbishop of Puerto Montt on 27 February 2001.

On 18 May 2018, Caro submitted his resignation to Pope Francis, as did all the Chilean bishops at the conclusion of a three-day meeting in Rome. On 11 June 2018, Pope Francis accepted his resignation as archbishop. Though Caro was not named in connection with the ongoing controversy surrounding clerical sexual abuse in Chile, Francis replaced him with an Apostolic Administrator just as he did those bishops whose resignations he accepted because of their involvement. He was accused a few days later of having failed to handle reports of sexual abuse by a priest properly, but he said appropriate procedures had been followed.

== See also ==
- Catholic Church in Chile
- Catholic sexual abuse cases in Chile
