= Aldo Maria Lazzarín Stella =

Aldo Maria Lazzarín Stella OSM
- Vicar Apostolic of Aysén
- Church: Catholic Church
- See: Apostolic Vicariate of Aysén
- In office: 15 May 1989 – 19 January 1998
- Predecessor: Savino Bernardo Maria Cazzaro Bertollo
- Successor: Luigi Infanti della Mora
- Other post: Titular Bishop of Tigisi in Numidia (1989-2010)

Orders
- Ordination: 8 April 1950 by Luigi Traglia
- Consecration: 13 August 1989 by Savino Bernardo Maria Cazzaro Bertollo

Personal details
- Born: 13 December 1926 Selva del Montello, Volpago del Montello, Province of Treviso, Kingdom of Italy
- Died: 16 October 2010 (aged 83)

Aldo Maria Lazzarín Stella (13 December 1926 – 16 October 2010) was the Italian-born in Selva di Volpago del Montello, Italy. Roman Catholic bishop of the Roman Catholic Apostolic Vicariate of Aisén, Chile. He died in Aysen, Chile.
