= Savino Bernardo Maria Cazzaro Bertollo =

Savino Bernardo Maria Cazzaro Bertollo O.S.M.
- Archbishop of Puerto Montt
- Church: Catholic Church
- Archdiocese: Archdiocese of Puerto Montt
- In office: 8 February 1988 – 27 February 2001
- Predecessor: Eladio Vicuña Aránguiz
- Successor: Cristián Caro Cordero
- Previous posts: Vicar Apostolic of Aysén (1963-1988); Titular Bishop of Pyrgos (1963-1988)

Orders
- Ordination: 16 April 1949
- Consecration: 13 February 1964 by Gregorio Pietro Agagianian

Personal details
- Born: 28 November 1924 Villa del Conte, Veneto, Kingdom of Italy
- Died: 13 August 2017 (aged 92) Vicenza, Veneto, Italy

Savino Bernardo Maria Cazzaro Bertollo O.S.M. (28 November 1924 – 13 August 2017) was an Italian prelate of the Catholic Church. He was archbishop of Puerto Montt in Chile from 1988 to 2001.

== Biography ==
Cazzaro was ordained a priest on April 16, 1949. Pope Paul VI appointed him Vicar Apostolic of Aysén on December 10, 1963. He participated at the third and the fourth session of the Second Vatican Council until 1965. In February 1988, Cazzaro was appointed archbishop of Puerto Montt by Pope John Paul II. He retired from this post on February 27, 2001.
