= Archaeological Park of Segóbriga =

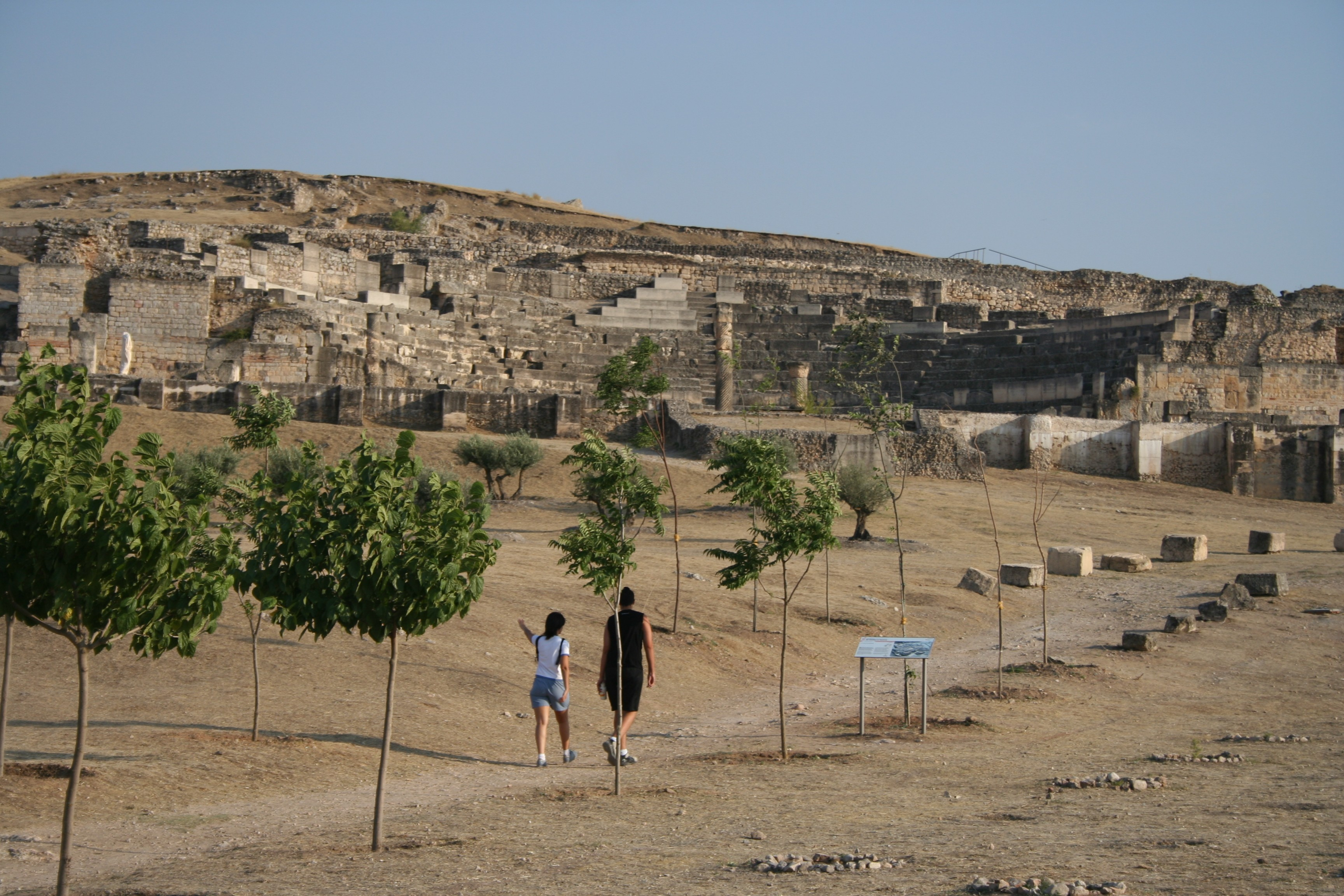
The walkway into the site with the theatre in the background

Segóbriga is a former Roman city near Saelices, in the province of Cuenca in Spain. It is possibly one of the most important archaeological sites of the Spanish Meseta.

The name Segóbriga derives from two words: "Sego" meaning victory and "briga" meaning city fortress. The translation would be "City of the Victory" or "Victorious City".

The site includes an amphitheatre, theatre, the city walls and gates, two thermal buildings or Roman baths, and the Forum. There is also a necropolis, and the circus (Roman race track) is being excavated - its outline can be seen from the top of the hill.

== Amphitheatre ==
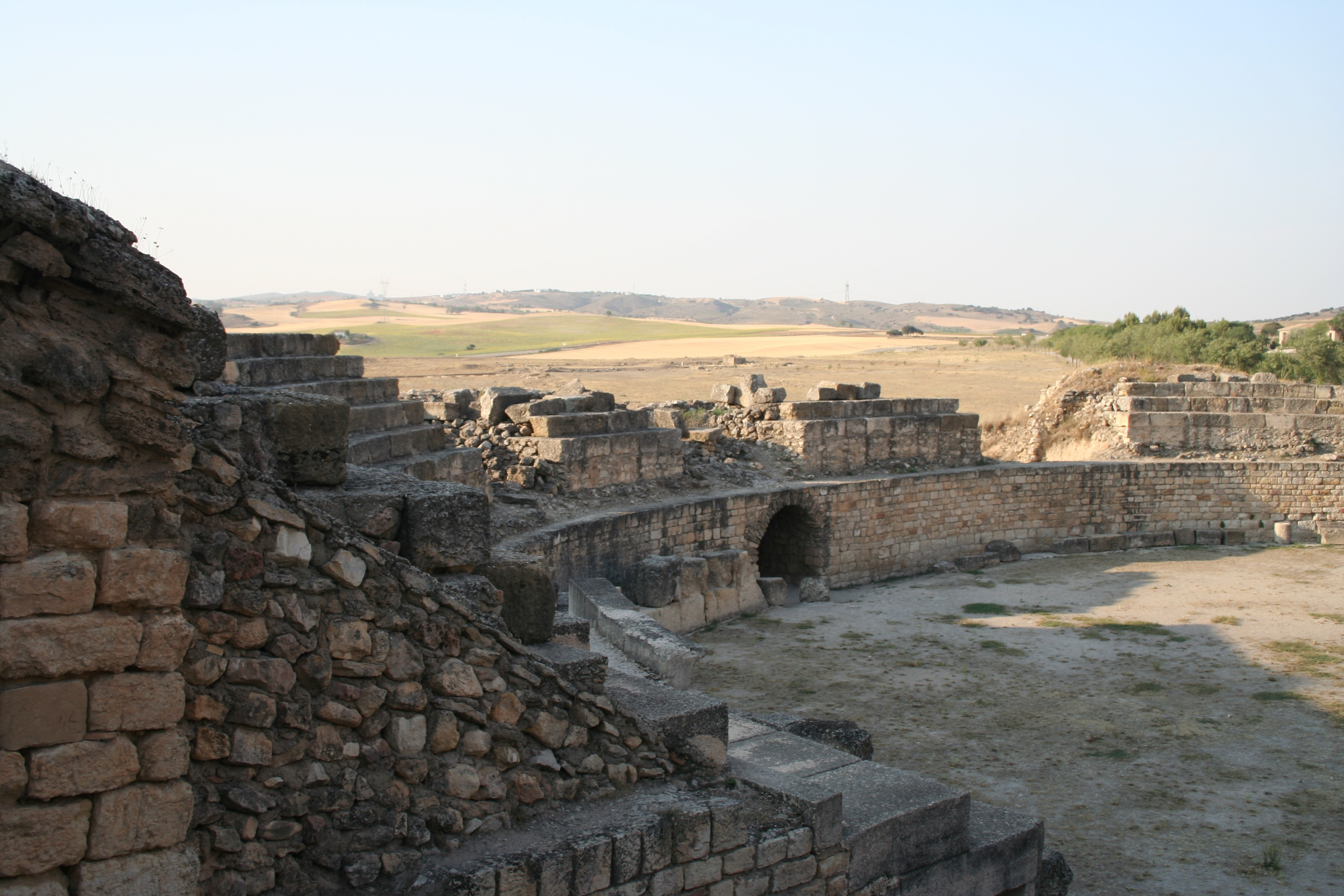
Amphitheatre of Segóbriga

The amphitheatre was built in front of the theatre with both flanking the gates of the city. The shape is an irregular elliptical form; being 75 metres long it is the biggest monument of Segóbriga with a capacity for 5,500 spectators. Two gates lead into the amphitheatre's arena. A covered corridor links these gates with the rooms where the wild animals were kept.

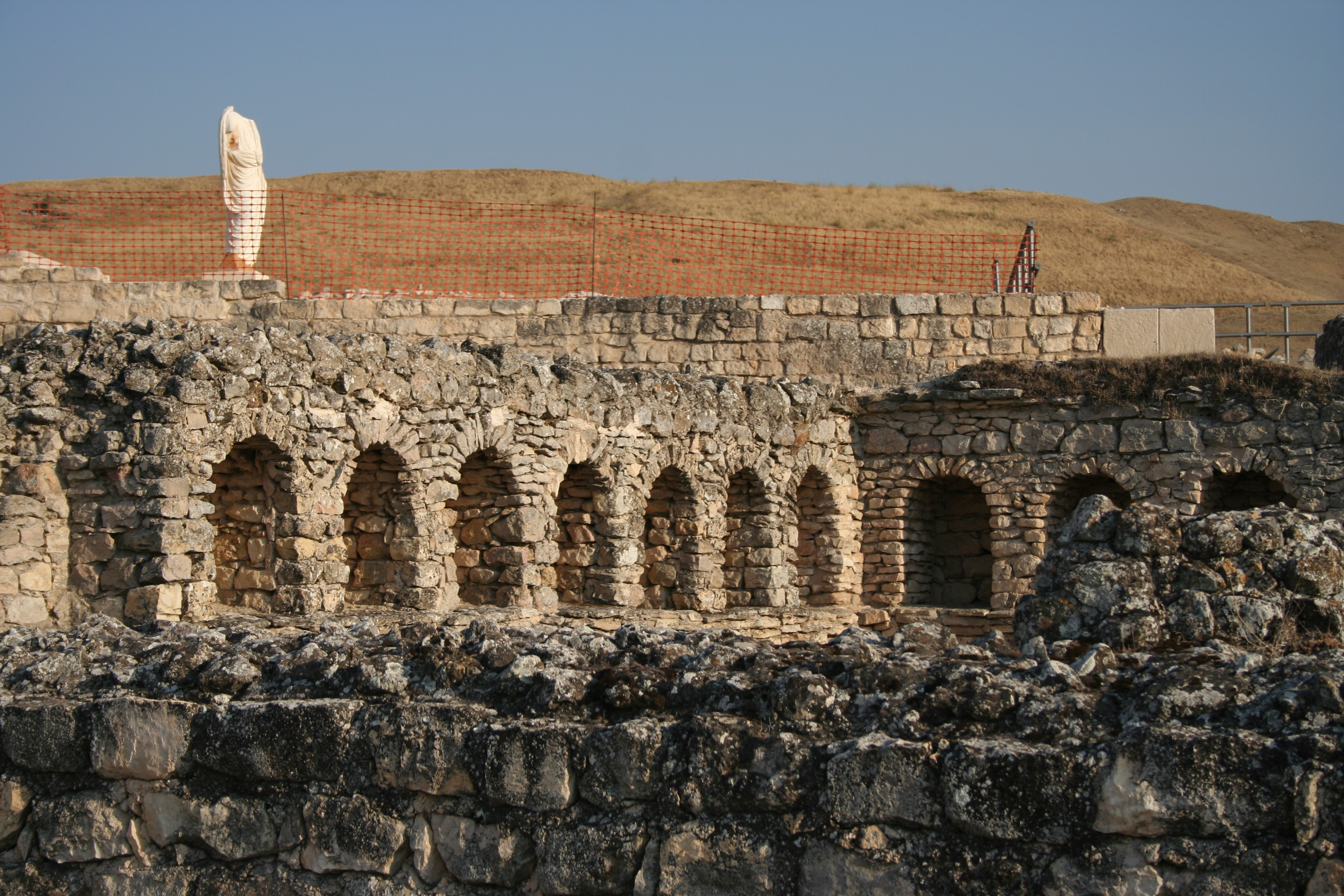
Part of the ruins

== Theatre ==
Construction of the theatre began under the emperor Tiberius and was completed during the Flavian dynasty, circa AD 79.

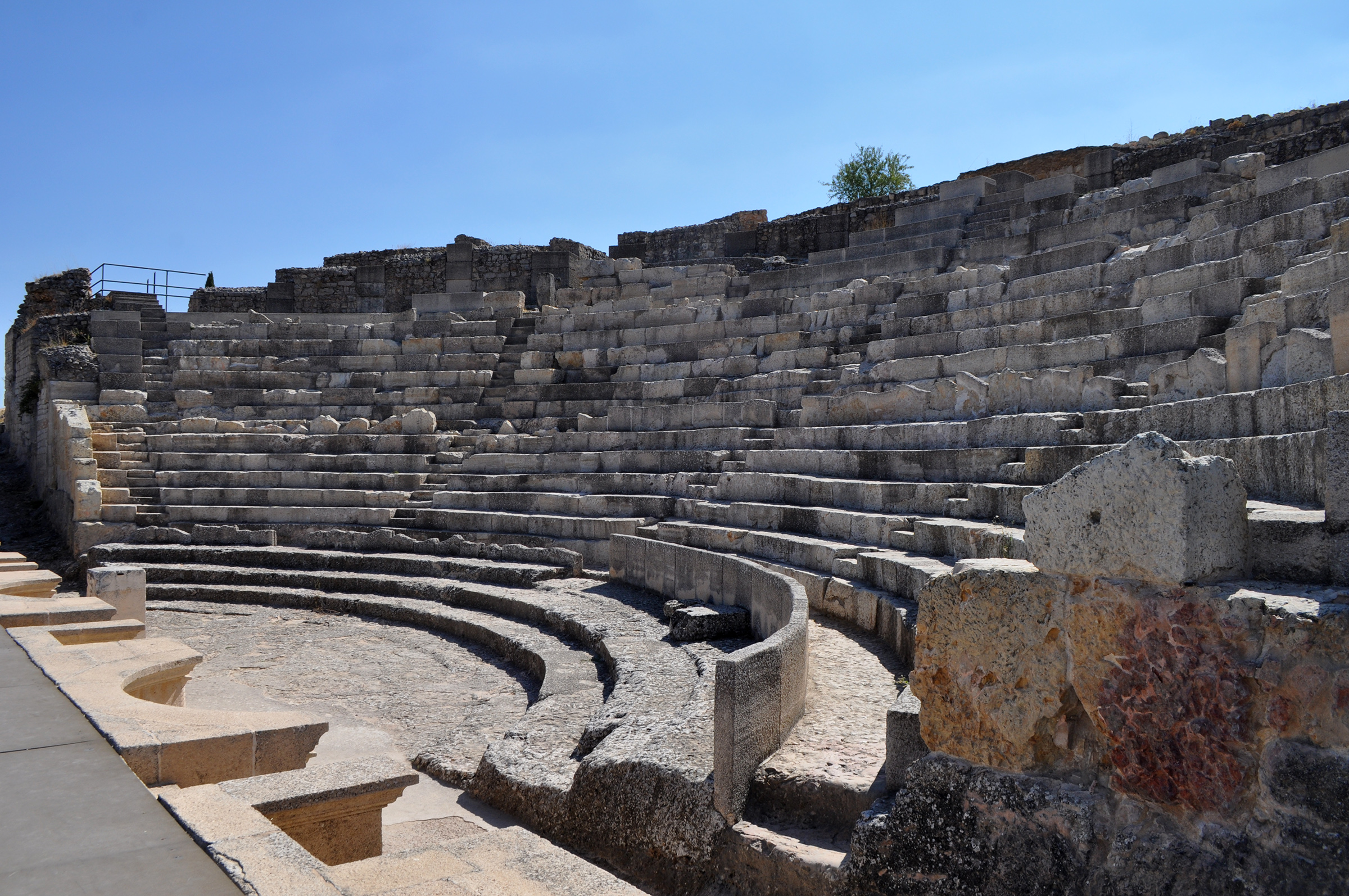
Segobriga Theatre
