= Apostolic Vicariate of Aysén =

Catholic missionary jurisdiction in Chile

Apostolic Vicariate of Aysén Vicariatus Apostolicus Aysenensis Vicariato Apostólico de Aysén

Location
- Country: Chile
- Metropolitan: Immediately exempt to the Holy See

Statistics
- Area: 109,865 km^{2} (42,419 sq mi)
- Population: Total; Catholics: (as of 2010); 97,000; 76,000 (78.4%)

Information
- Denomination: Catholic Church
- Sui iuris church: Latin Church
- Rite: Roman Rite
- Established: 17 February 1940 (85 years ago)
- Cathedral: Cathedral of Our Lady of Sorrows in Coyhaique
- Patron saint: Immaculate Conception

Current leadership
- Pope: Francis
- Apostolic Vicar: Luigi Infanti della Mora

The Apostolic Vicariate of Aysén (Latin: Vicariatus Apostolicus Aysenensis) is a Latin Church missionary ecclesiastical territory or apostolic vicariate of the Catholic Church in Chile. Originally, it was established as an apostolic prefecture on 17 February 1940 by Pope Pius XII and was subsequently elevated to apostolic vicariate on 8 May 1955. Its current bishop (Vicar Apostolic) is Mgr. Luigi Infanti della Mora, O.S.M.

== Diocesan statistics ==
The vicariate, which comprises the entire Region of Aisén (Aisén) in southern Chile, covers a territory of 109,865 km^{2} and has 6 parishes. It is estimated than 79% of the inhabitants of the vicariate are Catholic. This figure represents about 72,000 Catholics out of a total population of 90,000. The vicariate is entrusted to the priests of the Lombardo-Veneto province (Italy) of the Servite Order. The mother church of the diocese is the Cathedral of Santa Teresita in the city of Puerto Aisén.

== Bishops of the vicariate ==
- Antonio María Michelato Danese † (5 April 1940 – September 1958 resigned)
- Cesar Gerardo Vielmo Guerra † (19 December 1959 – 16 June 1963, died)
- Savino Bernardo Maria Cazzaro Bertollo (10 December 1963 – 8 February 1988 appointed archbishop of Puerto Montt)
- Aldo Maria Lazzarín Stella † (15 May 1989 – 19 January 1998 resigned)
- Luigi Infanti della Mora (30 August 1999 – )

== Parishes ==
- Santa Teresita, Cathedral - Puerto Aysén

Communities comprised in the parish: Sagrado Corazón, El Buen Pastor, El Carmen, Nuestra Señora de Guadalupe, Catedral, Jesús Nazareno, Puerto Chacabuco. Comunidades Rurales: El Salto, Los Torreones, El Balseo, Villa Mañihuales, Alto Mañihuales

- Nuestra Señora de los Dolores, Co-cathedral - Coyhaique

Communities comprised in the parish:

Urban: Co-catedral, Maria Inmaculada, Santuario Del Carmen, Sagrada Familia, San José, Cristo Obrero, Siete Santos Fundadores, Santos Juan Y Pablo, Santuario Jesús Nazareno, Santa Teresita de los Andes.

Rural: Balmaceda, El Blanco, Puerto Ibáñez, Levican, Cerro Castillo, Lago Pollux, Valle Simpson, Villa Frei, Seis Lagunas, Lago Atravesado, Alto Baguales, Villa Ortega, El Gato, Ñirehuao

- Nuestra Señora del Carmen - Chile Chico

Communities comprised in the parish: Chile Chico, Fachinal, Mallin Grande, Puerto Guadal, Puerto Bertrand, Río Tranquilo, Bahía Murta, Puerto Sánchez.

- Estrella del Mar - Puerto Aguirre

Communities comprised in the parish: Puerto Aguirre, Caleta Andrade, Estero Copa

- San José Obrero - Cochrane

Communities comprised in the parish: Cochrane, Caleta Tortel, Villa O'Higgins

- Nuestra Señora del Trabajo - Puerto Cisnes

Communities comprised in the parish: Puerto Cisnes, Villa Amengual, La Tapera, Lago Verde, La Junta, Puyuhuapi, Puerto Raúl Marín Balmaceda, Puerto Gala, Puerto Gaviota.
