= Tetci =

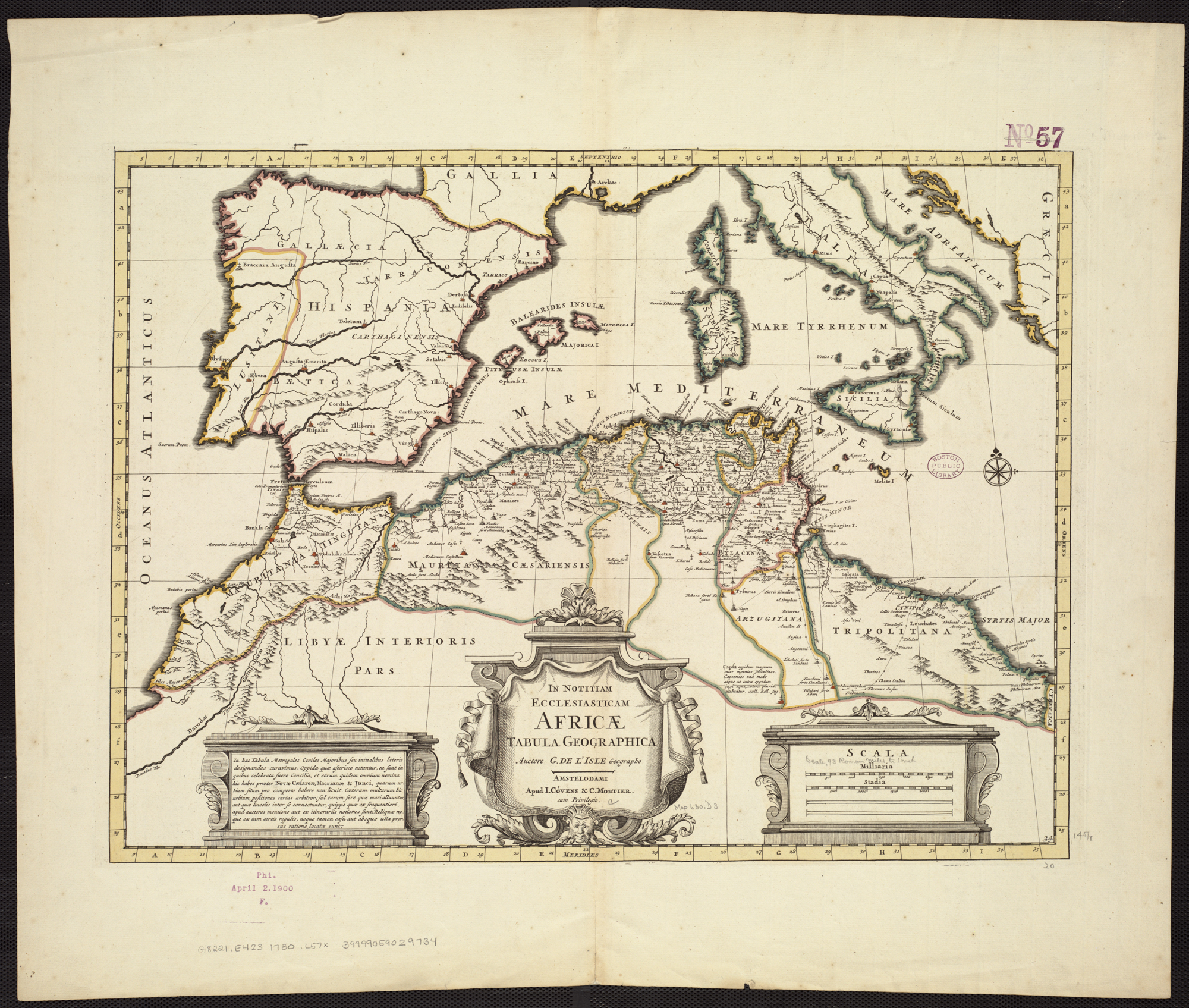
In notitiam ecclesiasticam Africæ tabula geographica.

The diocese of Tetci (Latin: Dioecesis Tetcitana) is a suppressed and titular see of the Roman Catholic Church. An exact location of the town is now lost to history but it was in today's Tunisia.

Tecti was an ancient bishopric of the Roman province of Byzacena.

The only known bishop of this African diocese is Rustico, who took part in the synod assembled in Carthage in 484 by the Arian King Huneric the Vandal, after which Rustico was exiled. Three years later a council called by Pope Felix III (487) had an African bishop named Rustico participate, but without mentioning the place of residence; may be the bishop of Tetci or the bishop of Tipasa of Numidia.

Today Tetci survives as a titular bishopric with the current bishop, Luis Fernando Ramos Pérez, auxiliary bishop of Santiago de Chile.
