= Eladio Vicuña Aránguiz =

Eladio Vicuña Aránguiz (June 2, 1911 – June 29, 2008) was a Chilean prelate of the Roman Catholic Church. He was born in Santiago de Chile. He had his priestly ordination on September 22, 1934.

During his religious career, Aránguiz worked as the Bishop of Chillán (1955–1974) and as the Archbishop of Puerto Montt (1974–1987). In the latter position, he was succeeded by Savino Bernardo Maria Cazzaro Bertollo.
