= Luis Fernando Ramos Pérez =

Chilean prelate of the Catholic Church (born 1959)

- Archbishop of Puerto Montt
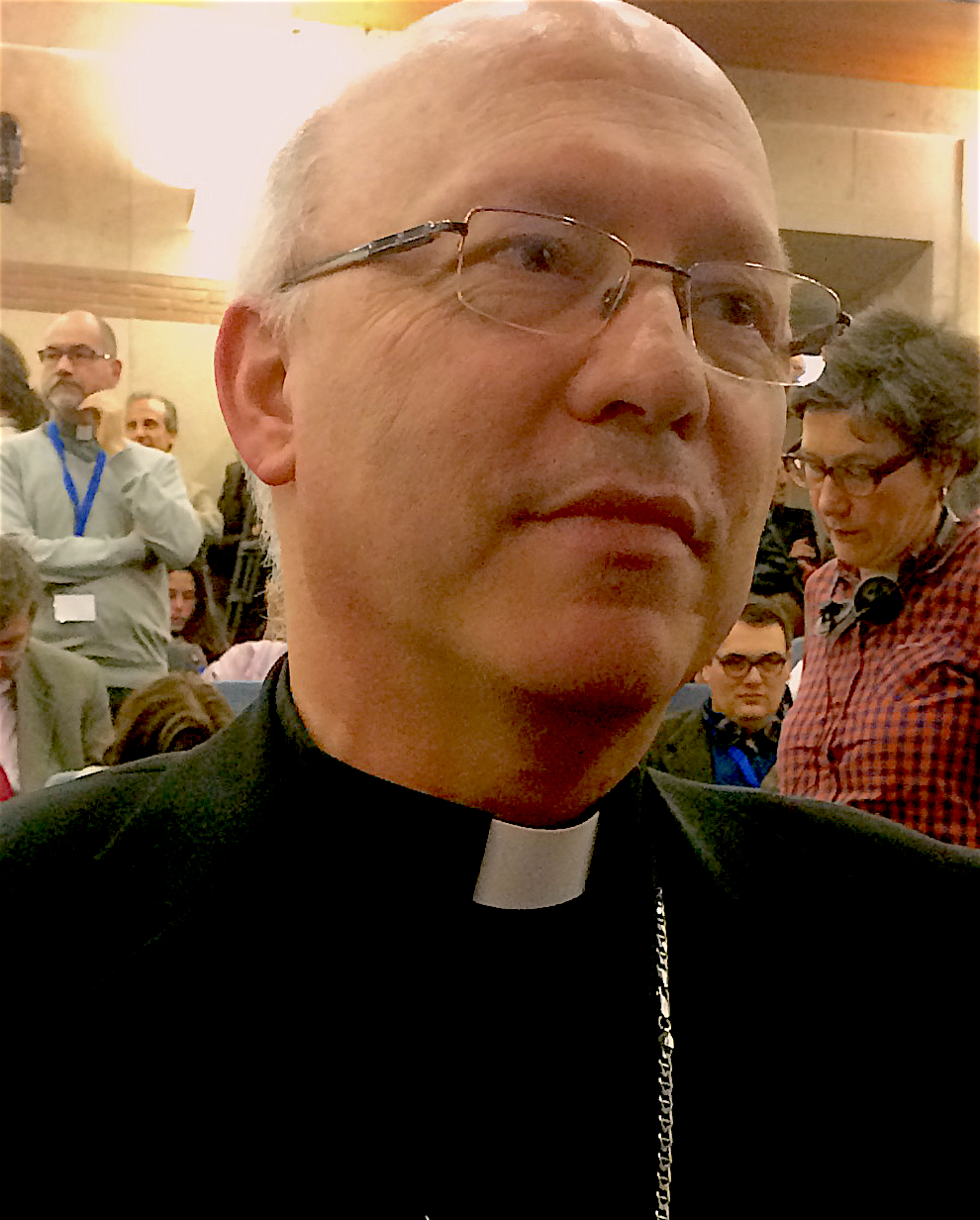
- Church: Catholic Church
- Archdiocese: Archdiocese of Puerto Montt
- Appointed: 27 December 2019
- Predecessor: Cristián Caro Cordero
- Previous posts: Apostolic Administrator of Rancagua (2018-2020); Titular Bishop of Tetci (2014-2019); Auxiliary Bishop of Santiago de Chile (2014-2019)

Orders
- Ordination: 5 May 1990 by Carlos Oviedo Cavada
- Consecration: 10 May 2014 by Ricardo Ezzati

Personal details
- Born: 2 January 1959 (age 67) Santiago, Chile

Luis Fernando Ramos Pérez (born 2 January 1959) is a Chilean prelate of the Catholic Church who was named Archbishop of Puerto Montt in December 2019.

== Biography ==
Ramos Pérez was born in Santiago on 2 January 1959. He earned a degree in engineering at the University of Chile. He then completed his philosophical and theological studies at the Major Seminary of Santiago and obtained his doctorate in theology with a specialization in sacred scripture from the Pontifical Gregorian University. He was ordained a priest on 5 May 1990. As a priest his assignments included Prefect of Philosophy in the Major Seminary of Santiago from 1990 to 1993, Parochial Vicar of the parish of Cristo Emaús from 1990 to 1993, and Parochial Vicar of the parish of Santo Toribio de Mogrovejo in 1993. From 1999 to 2007, he worked in Rome on the staff of the Congregation for Bishops. Returning to Santiago, he was Episcopal Vicar of the archdiocese for education in 2007, and Rector of the Major Seminary of Santiago from December 2007 to 2014 and Episcopal Vicar for the clergy from 2011 to 2014.

On 1 February 2014, Pope Francis named him Auxiliary Bishop of Santiago de Chile in the Titular Bishop of Tetci. He received his episcopal consecration on 10 May 2014 from Cardinal Ricardo Ezzati Andrello.

In November 2016 he became general secretary of the Bishops Conference of Chile. On 28 June 2018 he was made Apostolic Administrator of Rancagua.

He was appointed Archbishop of Puerto Montt on 27 December 2019.
