= Roman Catholic Diocese of Punta Arenas =

Diocese of the Catholic Church

Diocese of Punta Arenas Dioecesis Punta Arenas Diócesis de Punta Arenas

Catholic
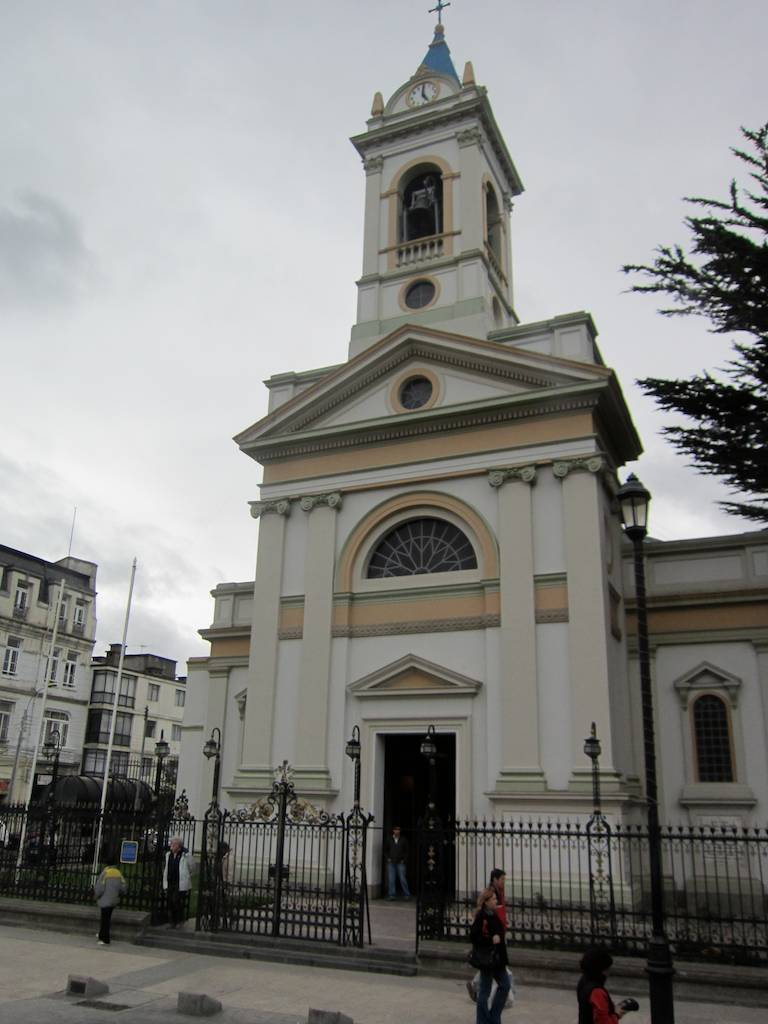
- Cathedral of the Sacred Heart

Location
- Country: Chile
- Ecclesiastical province: Puerto Montt
- Metropolitan: Puerto Montt

Statistics
- Area: 112,310 km^{2} (43,360 sq mi)
- Population: Total; Catholics: (as of 2004); 150,826; 120,208 (79.9%)

Information
- Rite: Latin Rite
- Established: 16 November 1883 (142 years ago)
- Cathedral: Cathedral of the Sacred Heart in Punta Arenas
- Patron saint: Mary Help of Christians

Current leadership
- Pope: Leo XIV
- Bishop: Óscar Hernán Blanco Martínez, O.M.D.
- Metropolitan Archbishop: Luis Fernando Ramos Pérez
- Bishops emeritus: Bernardo Miguel Bastres Florence

Website
- www.iglesiademagallanes.cl

The Diocese of Punta Arenas (in Latin: Dioecesis Punta Arenas) is a suffragan diocese of the Archdiocese of Puerto Montt, in Chile. Its current bishop is Mgr. Óscar Hernán Blanco Martínez, O.M.D.

== History ==
In 1883 the Holy See established the Apostolic Prefecture of Patagonia Meridional, Tierra del Fuego e Islas Malvinas, which was entrusted to the Salesian congregation. In 1916, the prefecture was upgraded and its name changed to Apostolic Vicariate of Magallanes e Islas Malvinas, and on 17 January 1947, Pope Pius XII erected the diocese proper by means of the Bulla "Ut in amplissimo Patagoniae Chilensis territorio". In 1952, the Apostolic Prefecture of the Falkland Islands was separated from the diocese.

All the bishops of the diocese of Punta Arenas belonged to the Salesian congregation between 1916 and 2022.

== Diocesan statistics ==
The diocese, which comprises the entire Chilean region of Magallanes (Magallanes y Antártida Chilena), covers a territory of 112,302 km². It is estimated than 79% of the inhabitants of the diocese are Catholic. This figure represents about 120,000 Catholics out of a total population of 151,000.

Punta Arenas is the southernmost diocese in the whole Roman Catholic Church and its parish Nuestra Señora del Carmen, in Puerto Williams (Navarino island), is the southernmost Catholic parish in the world.

The mother church of the diocese is the Cathedral of El Sagrado Corazón (Sacred Heart) in the city of Punta Arenas.

== Bishops ==
- Abraham Aguilera Bravo, S.D.B. † (22 December 1916 – 24 October 1924 appointed bishop of San Carlos de Ancud)
- Arturo Jara Márquez, S.D.B. † (29 January 1926 – 1938 resigned)
- Cándido Rada Senosiáin, S.D.B. † (13 December 1947, did not take effect)
- Vladimiro Boric Crnosija, S.D.B. † (1 February 1949 – 29 August 1973 died)
- Tomás Osvaldo González Morales, S.D.B. † (28 March 1974 – 4 March 2006 retired)
- Bernardo Bastres Florence, S.D.B. (4 March 2006 – 22 December 2021 resigned)
- Óscar Hernán Blanco Martínez, O.M.D. (13 July 2022 – present)

=== Other priest of this diocese who became bishop ===
- Alejandro Goić Karmelić, appointed Auxiliary Bishop of Concepción (Santissima Concezione)

== Parishes ==
- Sagrado Corazón (Cathedral), Punta Arenas
- María Auxiliadora, Punta Arenas
- Cristo Obrero, Punta Arenas
- San Miguel, Punta Arenas
- Nuestra Señora de Fátima, Punta Arenas
- María Auxiliadora, Puerto Natales
- San Francisco de Sales, Puerto Porvenir (Tierra del Fuego)
- Nuestra Señora del Carmen, Puerto Williams (in Navarino island)
- Padre Hurtado, Cerro Sombrero
