= Vladimiro Boric Crnosija =

Chilean cleric (1905–1973)

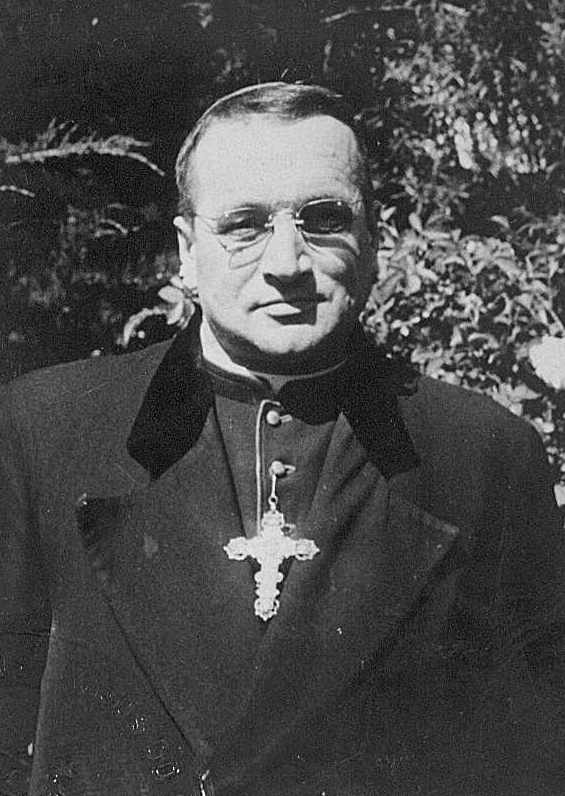
- Appointed: 1 February 1949

Orders
- Ordination: 2 October 1949 by Pope Pius XII

Personal details
- Born: Vladimiro Américo Jorge Boric Crnosija; 23 April 1906 Punta Arenas, Chile
- Died: 29 August 1973 (aged 67) Santiago, Chile

Vladimiro Américo Jorge Boric Crnosija (Croatian: Vladimir Borić Crnošija; 23 April 1905 – 29 August 1973) was a Chilean cleric and bishop for the Roman Catholic Diocese of Punta Arenas.

He was born to Juan (Ive) Boric and Natalia Crnosija, both Croatian immigrants, and completed his primary studies at the San José School. He became ordained in 1930 and was appointed bishop in October 1949 by Pope Pius XII, becoming the first bishop of his hometown of Punta Arenas. He died in Santiago on 29 August 1973, at the age of 68, less than two weeks before the 1973 Chilean coup d'état. His grandnephew, Gabriel Boric Font, is the former president of Chile.
