= Saelices =

- Municipality
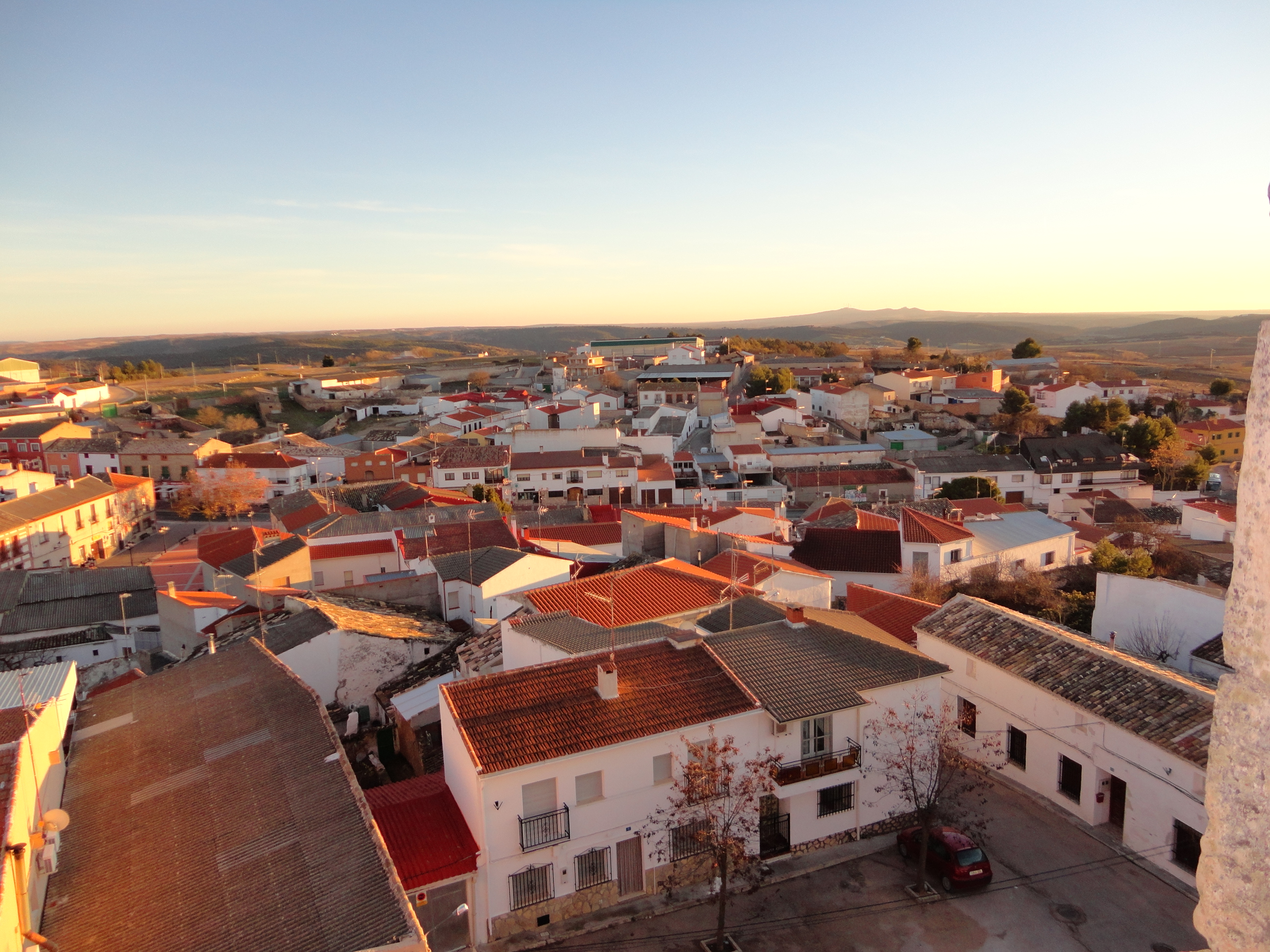

- Flag Coat of arms

- Location within Spain Location within Castilla-La Mancha
- Coordinates: 39.9197°N 2.80389°W
- Country: Spain
- Autonomous community: Castile-La Mancha
- Province: Cuenca

Area
  - Total: 80 km^{2} (31 sq mi)

Population (2025-01-01)
  - Total: 475
  - Density: 5.9/km^{2} (15/sq mi)
- Time zone: UTC+1 (CET)
  - Summer (DST): UTC+2 (CEST)

Saelices is a municipality located in the province of Cuenca, Castile-La Mancha, Spain. According to the 2004 census (INE), the municipality has a population of 649 inhabitants.

Segobriga, the remains of a Celtic and Roman city, is 6 km (3.7 mi) south of Saelices.
