= Ercavica =

- Location within Castilla-La Mancha Location within Spain
- 40.4318°N 2.6693°W
- Location: Spain
- Region: Castile–La Mancha

Ercavica (or Arcavica) was an important Roman City whose remains are visible today at the archaeological site. It is situated on the hill of Santaver near Cañaveruelas in Spain.

== History ==
The site of the Roman city of Ercávica is located on a promontory near the river Guadiela. The Celtiberian city stood a few kilometres away on the opposite bank of the river, and was a military camp during the Sertorian War.

Ercávica is mentioned for the first time in connection with the campaign of 179 BC of Tiberius Gracchus on the lands of Celtiberians. Livy recounts how the powerful and famous city of Ercávica, scared by the disasters suffered by neighbours, decided to open its doors to the Romans.

The Roman city was developed from the 2nd century BC with regular street plan, a city wall and public and private buildings. The Augustan period saw the transformation of Ercávica with the construction of sophisticated buildings such as a forum, basilica and temple(s), and the grant of status of municipium as shown by coins issued by its mint. It reached its apogee of prosperity during the first and second centuries AD. From the 3rd century the city began a slow decline that led to the abandonment of the site between the fourth century and the fifth century. Then the site appears to be reoccupied again, but under the name of Arcávica mentioned in the Councils of Toledo as an episcopal see, before it was moved to Cuenca.

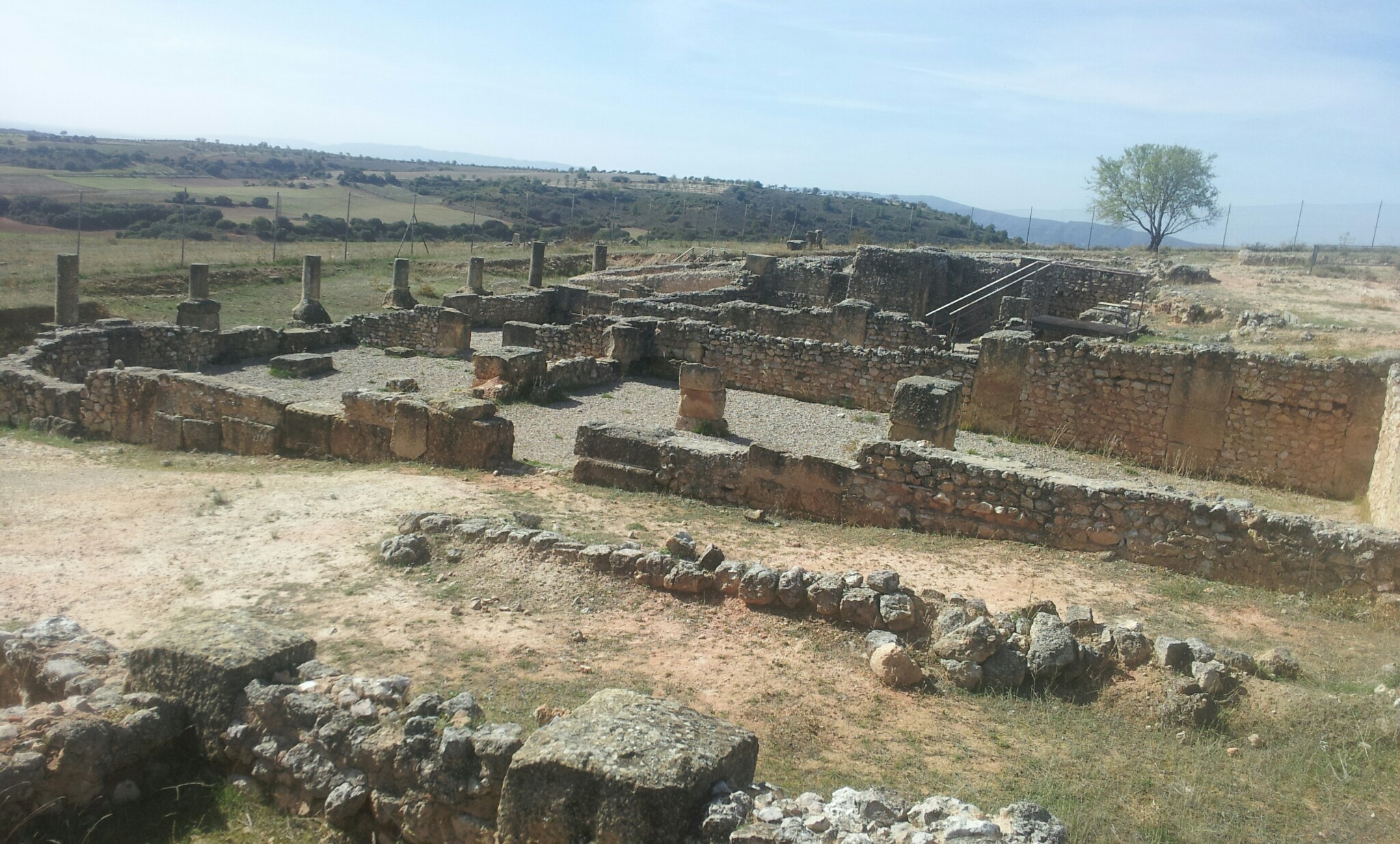
The public baths

== The Site ==
The Forum, as the public and civic centre, is composed of a set of monumental buildings. The square is rectangular, paved with large stone slabs surrounded by arcades, and on its southern side the basilica for judicial functions. On the western side is a group of small houses or shops, open to the main road (cardo maximus) that ran from north to south. A monumental base and an extension of the forum on the eastern side stand over a two-storey cryptoporticus. The town's houses in insulae are defined by cobbled streets and arcaded main roads perpendicular to the axis. The best known is the so-called Medical House, its rooms surrounding the atrium with impluvium with four columns.
