= Cañaveruelas =

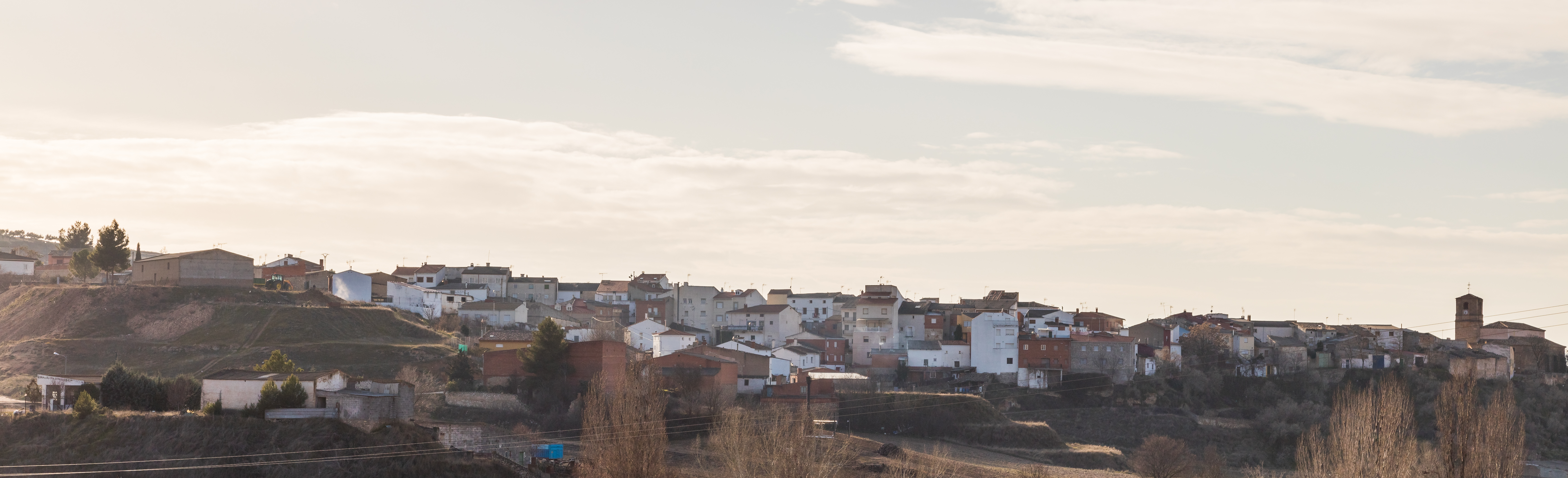

- Coat of arms

- Location of Cañaveruelas Cañaveruelas (Spain)
- Coordinates: 40°25′54.5″N 2°40′09.5″W
- Country: Spain
- Autonomous community: Castile–La Mancha
- Province: Cuenca

Government
  - Mayor: María de los Ángeles Sierra Gamboa

Area
  - Total: 33.57 km^{2} (12.96 sq mi)
- Elevation: 815 m (2,674 ft)

Population (2025-01-01)
  - Total: 110
- Postal code: 16537

Cañaveruelas is a municipality in Cuenca, Castile-La Mancha, Spain. It has a population of 223.

== Arcavica ==
Within the territory of the present-day municipality once stood the town of Ercavica (or Arcavica), an episcopal see whose bishop Petrus signed the acts of the Council of Toledo of 590. The last known bishop of Arcavica was Gabinius, who was of the late 7th century. His signature appears in the acts of the 16th Council of Toledo in 693. It is thought that Arcavica was destroyed in the Saracen invasion.

No longer a residential bishopric, Arcavica is today listed by the Catholic Church as a titular see.
