= Archdiocese of Puerto Montt =

Archdiocese in Chile

Coordinates: 41.4717°S 72.9367°W

Archdiocese of Puerto Montt Archidioecesis Portus Montt Arquidiócesis de Puerto Montt

Catholic
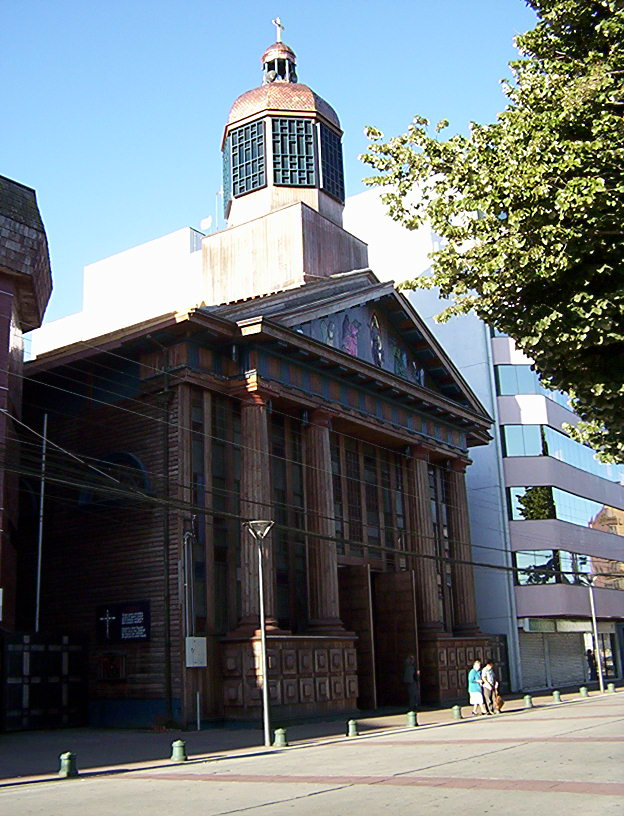
- Cathedral of Our Lady of Mount Carmel

Location
- Country: Chile
- Ecclesiastical province: Puerto Montt

Statistics
- Area: 17,664 km^{2} (6,820 sq mi)
- Population: Total; Catholics: (as of 2023); 459,570; 328,960 (71.6%)
- Parishes: 33

Information
- Denomination: Catholic Church
- Sui iuris church: Latin Church
- Rite: Roman Rite
- Established: 1 April 1939; 87 years ago
- Cathedral: Cathedral of Our Lady of Mount Carmel in Puerto Montt
- Patron saint: Our Lady of Mount Carmel
- Secular priests: 53 (35 Diocesan, 18 Religious Orders)

Current leadership
- Pope: Leo XIV
- Metropolitan Archbishop: Luis Fernando Ramos Pérez
- Bishops emeritus: Cristián Caro Cordero

Website
- www.arzobispadodepuertomontt.cl

The Archdiocese of Puerto Montt (in Latin: Archidioecesis Portus Montt) is a Metropolitan See of the Roman Catholic church, in Chile. Its suffragan dioceses are: Osorno, San Carlos de Ancud and Punta Arenas.

== History ==
The diocese of Puerto Montt was created with territory carved out of the diocese of San Carlos de Ancud, on 11 April 1939, by Pope Pius XII and elevated to Archdiocese and Metropolitan on 10 May 1963. The "Virgen del Carmen" is the patroness saint of the archdiocese.

== Diocesan statistics ==
The archdiocese, which comprises the entire province of Llanquihue in the Los Lagos region of Chile, covers a territory of 17,664km^{2} and has 33 parishes. The estimated catholic population of the diocese is about 328,960 out of a total population of 459,570. The diocesan cathedral, located in the city of Puerto Montt, was built in 1870 in the doric style and is dedicated to the "Virgen del Carmen".

== Ordinaries of Puerto Montt ==
=== Bishops of Puerto Montt ===
- Ramón Munita Eyzaguirre (29 April 1939 – 23 November 1957), appointed Bishop of San Felipe)
- Alberto Rencoret Donoso (21 March 1958 – 10 May 1963 see below)

=== Archbishops of Puerto Montt ===
- Alberto Rencoret Donoso (see above 10 May 1963 – 18 May 1970), resigned
  - Apostolic Administrator Francisco Valdés Subercaseaux, O.F.M. Cap. (February 1974 – 18 August 1974), Bishop of Osorno
- Eladio Vicuña Aránguiz (16 July 1974 – 13 May 1987), retired
- Savino Bernardo Maria Cazzaro Bertollo, O.S.M. (8 February 1988 – 27 February 2001), retired
- Cristián Caro Cordero (27 February 2001 – 11 June 2018), retired
  - Apostolic Administrator Ricardo Basilio Morales Galindo, O. de M. (11 June 2018 – 29 February 2020)
- Luis Fernando Ramos Pérez (27 December 2019 – Present)

=== Auxiliary bishop ===
- Jorge Maria Hourton Poisson (1969-1974), appointed Auxiliary Bishop of Santiago de Chile

== Parishes and Sanctuaries ==
Parishes:

- Matriz Nuestra Señora del Carmen, (Cathedral) Puerto Montt
- San Pedro, Puerto Montt (Angelmó)
- Cristo Rey, Puerto Montt
- San Antonio de Padua, Puerto Montt (Bellavista)
- Cristo Crucificado, Puerto Montt
- María Madre y Reina, Puerto Montt
- San Pablo, Puerto Montt
- Buen Pastor, Puerto Montt
- Nuestra Señora de Fátima, Puerto Montt
- San Miguel Arcángel, Calbuco-Puluqui
- María Inmaculada, Cochamó
- Santo Toribio, Las Quemas
- San Pedro, Los Muermos
- San José, Llanquihue
- Espíritu Santo, Fresia
- Inmaculada Concepción, Frutillar
- Nuestra Señora del Rosario, Maullín
- Santa Rosa, Nueva Braunau
- Nuestra Señora de Fátima, Puerto Chico
- Sagrado Corazón de Jesús, Puerto Varas
- Inmaculada Concepción, Río Frío
- San Pedro, Rolecha
- San Andrés, Tegualda

Sanctuaries:

- Sanctuary (Gruta) "Nuestra Señora de Lourdes", Puerto Montt
