= Los archivos del cardenal =

Chilean TV series

- Genre: Drama, action, suspense
- Created by: Josefina Fernández
- Written by: Josefina Fernández; Nona Fernández; Luis Emilio Guzmán
- Directed by: Nicolás Acuña; Juan Ignacio Sabatini
- Starring: Benjamín Vicuña; Daniela Ramírez; Néstor Cantillana; Alejandro Trejo; Paulina García; Francisco Melo
- Theme music composer: Silvio Rodríguez
- Opening theme: "Santiago de Chile" by Los Bunkers
- Composer: Camilo Salinas
- Country of origin: Chile
- Original language: Spanish
- No. of seasons: 2
- No. of episodes: 24

Production
- Executive producers: Sergio Gandara; Leonora Gonzalez; Rony Goldschmied
- Editor: Javier Estévez

Original release
- Network: TVN
- Release: 21 July 2011 – 25 May 2014

Los archivos del cardenal (The Archives of the Cardinal) is a Chilean TV series that premiered on 21 July 2011 on Televisión Nacional de Chile (TVN) and was based on the human rights defense work carried out by the Vicariate of Solidarity during the dictatorship of General Augusto Pinochet (1973–1990). The first season had 12 episodes, achieving an audience rating of 17.5 points for its first chapter. The last episode of the season got 8.0 points, and was broadcast live at the Museum of Memory and Human Rights before more than 2,000 people in a giant screen projection.

After sweeping the 2012 Altazor Awards (Best Screenplay, Best Director, Best Actress, and Best Actor), its director Nicolás Acuña announced the renewal of the series for a second season. This one, which consists of 12 episodes, was released on Sunday, 9 March 2014, achieving an average of 6.5 points, but generating discomfort among the cast and crew due to its filming schedule.

== Plot ==
Los archivos del cardenal is a work of fiction, but it is based on real events.

The series tells the story of lawyer Ramón Sarmiento (Benjamín Vicuña) and social worker Laura Pedregal (Daniela Ramírez), both workers of the Vicariate of Solidarity, an organization founded by Cardinal Raúl Silva Henríquez and whose mission was to advise families of the victims of human rights abuses during the Chilean military dictatorship which existed between 1973 and 1990. In this institution, the social assistants had the task of receiving persecuted politicians and their relatives, especially of the disappeared detainees. Subsequently, the lawyers had the job of filing recurso de amparo legal actions that were aimed at protecting people.

The first season of the series starts with Ramón Sarmiento, a lawyer and member of a high class family who had suffered the expropriation of his haciendas during the agrarian reform under the government of Eduardo Frei Montalva. Investigating the appearance of bones on a farm near his own, Sarmiento meets Laura Pedregal, who works at the Vicariate with her father, Carlos Pedregal (Alejandro Trejo). Together they begin to get involved in the stories of those persecuted by the security agents of the dictatorship, such as the Central Nacional de Informaciones, under the direction of the vicar Cristián (Francisco Melo), a role inspired by the story of priest Cristián Precht.

== Origin ==
The original idea belongs to Josefina Fernández, whose father was an external lawyer of the Vicariate of Solidarity. After reading the three volumes of the book Chile: La memoria prohibida (1989), written by Eugenio Ahumada, Augusto Góngora and Rodrigo Atria – one of the first documents about the human rights violations that occurred during the dictatorship and prior to the Rettig Report – she realized that the testimonies, due to their intensity and drama, could perfectly become chapters of a series.

== Ratings ==
Season	Day and hour	Episodes	Debut		Finale	
Season	Day and hour	Episodes	Date	Rating	Date	Rating
1	Sunday 22:00	12	21 July 2011	17.5	13 October 2011	8.0
2	Sunday 22:00	12	9 March 2014	6.5	25 May 2014	6.2

== Cast ==
=== Season 1 main cast ===
- Benjamín Vicuña as Ramón Sarmiento
- Daniela Ramírez as Laura Pedregal
- Néstor Cantillana as Manuel Gallardo / Comandante Esteban
- Paulina García as Mónica Spencer
- Francisco Melo as Cristián Precht
- Iván Álvarez de Araya as Mauro Pastene
- Consuelo Holzapfel as Julia Correa
- Edgardo Bruna as Marcos Sarmiento
- Carmina Riego as Norma Allende
- Alejandro Trejo as Carlos Pedregal
- Natalia Grez as Francisca Sarmiento
- Víctor Montero as Troglo
- Claudia Cabezas as Alicia Carvallo / Fabiana
- Mateo Iribarren as Lawrence Martínez
- Daniel Kiblisky as Juan José Sarmiento

=== Season 1 guests ===
- Luz Jiménez as Doña Ana
- Claudia Cabezas as Alicia Carvallo / Fabiana
- Paula Zúñiga as Rosa Mardones
- Elvis Fuentes as Rafael Ríos
- Francisca Gavilán as Susana Pérez
- Gonzalo Canelo as Pablo Catrileo
- Omar Morán as Fabián
- José Luis Aguilera as Juan Ahumada
- Francisco Celhay as Federico
- Luz Croxatto as Rafaella Troncoso
- Alejandro Goic as Jaime Troncoso
- Óscar Hernández as Victorino
- Manuela Oyarzún as Marta Soto
- María Paz Grandjean as Olga Marambio
- Mario Ossandón as Thomas Parker
- Marcelo Valdivieso as Wilson
- Mauricio Dell as Alejandro
- Loreto González as Nicole
- Mauricio Rojas as Pedro Jofré
- Patricia Velasco as Mother of Fabián
- Hugo Vásquez as Padre Pierre
- Víctor Rojas as The Cardinal (Raúl Silva Henríquez)
- Luis Arenas as Judge
- Juan Quezada as Campesino
- Jessica Vera as Maricarmen
- Blanca Turrientes as Monja
- Sidharta Corvalán as Perito

=== Season 2 main cast ===
- Daniela Lhorente as Andrea Fuentealba
- Francisco Reyes as Juez Eduardo Varela
- Roberto Farías as Marcelo Alarcón
- Juan Pablo Miranda as Javier Bustos
- Erto Pantoja as Guillermo Esteban Reyes, "El Rucio"
- Elvira Cristi as Estela Rossi
- Gregory Cohen as Padre Marchant
- José Secall as Vicario Sergio
- Liliana García as Isabel
- Sissi Fuentealba as Teresa
- Tito Bustamante as Fiscal Robles
- Hernán Cubillos as Pedro
- Vittorio Yaconi as Julio Santelices
- Nicolás Zárate as Raúl
- Sebastián Plaza as Antonio
- Carlos Morales as Braulio
- Patricio Ordenes as Mocito
- Rodrigo Gijón as Francisco "Pancho" Jiménez
- Alex Rivera as Daniel Petit
- Carlos Araya as Fuenzalida
- Jaime Omeñaca as Octavio García
- Hellen Cáceres as Doctor Vargas
- Rodrigo Soto as Derek
- Ramón González as Comandante Francisco
- Eduardo Burlé as Gabriel
- María José Illanes as Olivia
- Natalia Reddersen as Gabriela
- Gonzalo Durán as Frentista
- Ana Burgos as Pilar
- Lucas Balmaceda as Roberto
- Constanza Araya as Mariela
- Clara María Escobar as Silvia
- Joaquín Guzmán as Salvador
- Agustín Moya as Magistrate

== Creative team ==
- Josefina Fernández – original idea
- Nicolás Acuña – director
- Rony Goldhmied – executive producer
- Nona Fernández – screenwriter
- Luis Emilio Guzmán – screenwriter
- Enrique Videla – screenwriter
- Valeria Vargas – screenwriter
- Larissa Contreras – screenwriter

== Investigation of the actual events ==
The series is fiction, but it is based on real events. The Center for Research and Publications (CIP) of Diego Portales University's Faculty of Communication and Literature seeks to rescue, through the website Los Casos de la Vicaría, those real cases and some of the protagonists, as well as accounting for how the events were covered by the mainstream media of the time.

== Reception ==
The president of National Renewal, Carlos Larraín, took advantage of a meeting of the expanded political committee that was held at La Moneda Palace to express his annoyance over the TVN broadcast of Los archivos del cardenal.

The series takes events that happened exactly 40 years ago, but that have obvious political connotations; the left as a victim, and that is what gives it fuel to act in politics with a sense of superiority.

— Carlos Larrain, 13 July 2011

He added: "How interesting would have been a TV series of what would have happened if the admirers of Lenin, Stalin, and Fidel Castro had asserted themselves in power."

The day after the premiere, the National Renewal deputy Alberto Cardemil put a hard question to TVN following the exhibition of Los archivos del cardenal.

During the last 20 years, a hard center left and leading journalistic class (using expression as a synonym of that assigned to politicians), which manages the editorial, informative, and reporting line with a clear favorable intention to the Concertación or what is left of it, was organized in that medium.

— Alberto Cardemil, 22 July 2011

Regarding the series, Cardemil expressed in his column:

The context and intention of the series (technically admirable, with pure and ill-spoken terrorist youth, non-pedophile priest, idealistic girl, farmer ashamed of being a boss, judge implacable with the uniforms, suspense in background music and environmental nicotine that brings to mind the good French cinema) is an abuse of public silver, and violates, from end to end, TVN's own "programmatic and editorial orientations", which obliges it to present balanced facts and opinions, recognizing the diversity of perspectives and sensitivities that occur in the country, in addition to promoting "unity", "pluralism", "objectivity", and "rigor in the explanation of the facts".

— Alberto Cardemil, 22 July 2011

The PPD deputy Tucapel Jiménez Fuentes referred to the criticisms of his colleague Cardemil, saying that "a country without memory has no future." The son of trade unionist Tucapel Jiménez Alfaro, murdered by state agents in 1982, he also responded to the criticism of the deputy RN:

Today the voice is raised by those who were silent when in our country the most atrocious crimes were committed, justifying in any way the human rights violations committed when they were part of the dictatorship. Those who say they have not heard about what happened in the country, those who lived that time and have forgotten it and especially the young. All of us who want a healthy country of the soul with truth, with justice, without erasing our past, so that Chile never returns to live through the horrors that it had to survive for 17 years.

— Tucapel Jiménez Fuentes, 22 July 2011

== Soundtrack ==
To promote the series, a music video was produced of the group Los Bunkers, who interpret the central theme of Los archivos del cardenal. The song "Santiago de Chile" by Silvio Rodríguez was composed in 1975 and is part of Los Bunkers' tribute album to the Cuban singer-songwriter, Música libre, which they play other compositions from when the episodes end.

- Santiago del Nuevo Extremo – "A mi ciudad" (main theme)
- Los Jaivas – "Mira niñita" (theme of Laura and Manuel)
- Santiago del Nuevo Extremo – "Simplemente"
- Los Bunkers – "Ángel para un final"
- Francis Cabrel – "La quiero a morir"
- Roberto Carlos – "Cóncavo y convexo"
- León Gieco – "Solo le pido a Dios"
- Los Bunkers – "La Era está pariendo un corazón"
- Quilapayún – "Yo Te Nombro Libertad"
- Manuel García – "Dejame Pasar la Vida" (final song of the last chapter)

== Season 1 ==
=== Cultural event at the Museum of Memory ===
On 13 October 2011, at the Museum of Memory and Human Rights, the filmmaking team of the series joined with a large number of people, members of human rights organizations, to show the last chapter of the series' first season. Before the screening, a letter of greeting was read by Estela Ortiz, widow of José Manuel Parada, one of the three murdered professionals, a former official of the Vicariate of Solidarity, whose case inspired the last chapter. The director Nicolás Acuña was present to thank the filmmaking team and the actors. The singer Manuel García closed the day, who together with the musician Camilo Salinas interpreted the songs "Déjame pasar la vida" and "Te recuerdo Amanda" by Víctor Jara.

In attendance was the daughter of José Manuel Parada, Javiera, who before the last chapter of the series, said: "It is very difficult to see events that marked my life, which meant the end of my childhood, which meant a break in my family from which one does not recover, but at the same time it is very exciting to see it in a Chile that is making changes today." Deputy Tucapel Jiménez Fuentes, son of union leader Tucapel Jiménez Alfaro, whose case was recreated in one of the chapters, commented on the meaning of this series for a sector of citizens: "There are people who lived through these years of dictatorship and horror and forgot, and there are people who lived those years and never believed what they were living through in Chile. So for them I think it's important." Also present was the former president of the Association of Families of the Detained-Disappeared, Viviana Díaz, who praised "the contribution that Televisión Nacional is making to the recovery of memory in our country. It's very important. I think that this series will help young people who did not live through this hard and difficult time in our country, to get to know it."

=== Book and DVD launch at the Museum of Memory ===
On 15 December 2011, at the Museum of Memory and Human Rights, the DVD of the first season of the series was launched along with the book Los archivos del Cardenal: Casos Reales, which brings together 18 investigations carried out by School of Journalism of Diego Portales University (UDP) in collaboration with CIPER on the facts and the work of the Vicariate of Solidarity that inspired the series broadcast by TVN. The book and the DVD were presented by UDP rector Carlos Peña and the director of the Centro de Estudios Públicos (CEP), Arturo Fontaine Talavera, as well as director Nicolás Acuña and journalist Andrea Insunza, who headed the Casos de los Archivos del Cardenal project. The team that created the articles compiled in the book was directed by Andrea Insunza and Javier Ortega, both UDP researchers, and depended on the participation of CIPER director Mónica González and the journalists Francisca Skoknic, Juan Cristóbal Peña, Alejandra Matus, and Ana María Sanhueza. In addition, students Daniel Arrieta, Javiera Matus, and Jordan Jopia joined the investigations.

=== 2012 Altazor Awards ===
Los archivos del Cardenal received Altazor Awards in the categories of Audiovisual Arts, Television: Direction, corresponding to Nicolás Acuña and Juan Ignacio Sabatini; Screenplay for the team formed by Josefina Fernández, Nona Fernández, and Luis Emilio Guzmán; Best Actress for Daniela Ramírez; and Best Actor for Alejandro Trejo.

== Season 2 ==
The second season of the series begins with the reunion of Laura and Ramón 15 months after the end of the first season. Ramón has taken the role that Carlos Pedregal left at the Vicariate of Solidarity, now counting on the help of two new lawyers, Andrea and Javier. Monica begins to demand justice in the case of her husband, a case that must be investigated by a judge (Judge Varela played by Francisco Reyes). This role is inspired by Judge José Canóvas who investigated the Degollados case, as well as Judge Carlos Cerda. Vicario's new role was assumed by the actor José Secall, who for the years in which this second season takes place is inspired by the work of vicar Sergio Valech. The second season consists of 12 episodes. On Sunday, 25 May 2014, the last chapter of the second season was presented. It was two episodes that were broadcast the same day, in a follow-up. This chapter had 6.2 units of average online rating, a figure that was below the 11.6 points achieved in the first season.

=== Book and DVD launch at the Santiago Book Fair ===
On 8 November 2014, at the Santiago International Book Fair, the DVD of the second season of the series was launched along with the book Los archivos del Cardenal 2: Casos Reales, which gathered the journalistic investigations carried out by the investigative team of the Casos Vicaría website. The book and DVD were presented by the TVN press director Alberto Luengo and the Jesuit priest Felipe Berrios. The editors of this investigation are journalists Andrea Insunza and Javier Ortega.

== See also ==
- Human rights violations in Pinochet's Chile
- Documentation and Archive Foundation of the Vicariate of Solidarity
