= Cristián Precht Bañados =

Chilean Catholic former priest (born 1940)

- Born: 1940 (age 85–86)
- Citizenship: Chile
- Education: Seminario Pontificio de Santiago
- Occupation: Roman Catholic priest
- Years active: 1967–2018
- Religion: Roman Catholic
- Ordained: 6 August 1967
- Laicized: 12 September 2018
- Offices held: Exec. Secy. of the Comité Pro Paz, Vicariate of Solidarity, Vicar of eastern Santiago, Pastoral Secy. of the archdiocese, Vicar general of Ministry, V.P of the national papal commission, Vicar of Youth Ministry of Santiago, Episcopal Vicar for the Southern Zone, Executive Secy. of the Canonization Commission, Vicar General of Ministry of the Archdiocese of Santiago, Adjunct General Secy. of the Episcopal Conference of Latin America.

Cristián Precht Bañados (born 23 September 1940) is a Chilean Catholic former priest, known for his work during the military dictatorship in defense of human rights. He was vicar of the Vicariate of Solidarity between 1976 and 1979. In September 2018, he was laicized for his participation in cases of child sexual abuse.

== Career ==
Precht gained national recognition in the 1980s when he served as head of the Church's Vicariate of Solidarity human rights group that challenged ex-dictator Augusto Pinochet to end the practice of torture in Chile.

In 1976, Precht was instrumental in the creation of APSI, a Chilean periodical opposed to the Pinochet regime which published until 1995.

He was accused of molesting boys, including those who came to him for confession, while visiting facilities of the Catholic religious institute the Marist Brothers, whom Chilean police have investigated regarding claims of sex abuse at many of the group's facilities.

Precht was suspended from ministry between 2012 and 2017 after being convicted by the Congregation for the Doctrine of the Faith. On 12 September 2018, Precht was convicted of sexually abusing minors and adults, and Pope Francis laicized him.

== See also ==
- APSI
- Catholic Church in Chile
- Catholic Church sex abuse cases by country
- Catholic sexual abuse cases in Chile
- Human rights in Chile
- Los archivos del cardenal
- Marist Brothers
- Roman Catholic Archdiocese of Santiago de Chile
