= Ana González de Recabarren =

Chilean human rights activist (1925–2018)

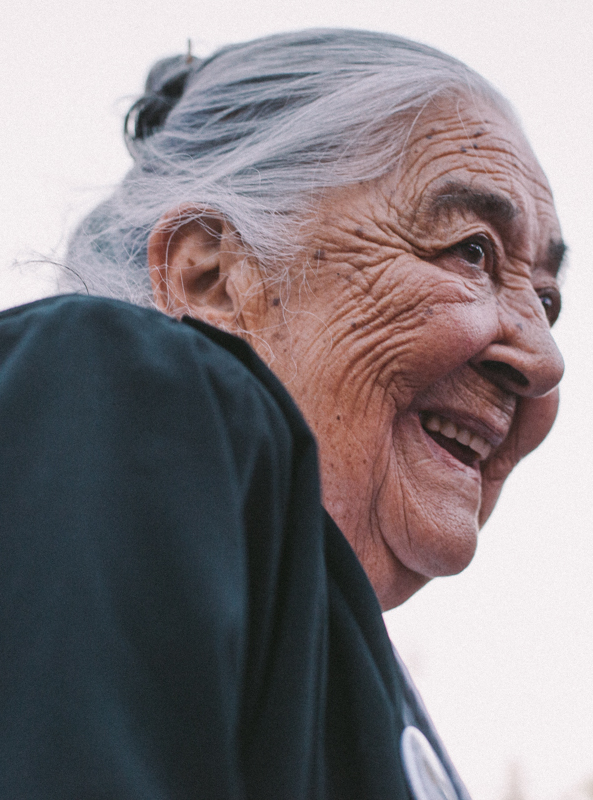
- Ana González de Recabarren in 2013
- Born: Ana González González; 25 July 1925; Toco, Tocopilla Province, Chile
- Died: 26 October 2018 (aged 93); San José Hospital, Santiago, Chile
- Education: University of Chile
- Occupation: Human rights activist
- Known for: Co-founder of the Association of Families of the Detained-Disappeared
- Political party: Communist Party of Chile (1942–2002)
- Spouse: Manuel Segundo Recabarren Rojas (m. 1944)
- Children: 6

Ana González de Recabarren (25 July 1925 – 26 October 2018) was a Chilean human rights activist and co-founder of the Association of Families of the Detained-Disappeared. Two of González's sons, pregnant daughter-in-law and husband were forcibly disappeared in April 1976 by the Chilean Military dictatorship.

== Early life ==
Ana González González was born on 25 July 1925 in Toco, a nitratine mine in Tocopilla Province, Chile. In the 1930s the González's family moved to Tocopilla and later to Renca, Santiago. González attended the School of Applied Arts at the University of Chile.

In 1942, González joined the Communist Party, remaining a member until 2002. In 1944, González married Manuel Segundo Recabarren Rojas, a graphic designer, union leader and fellow member of the Communist Party. During the Allende government Recabarren Rojas was the president of the San Miguel Supply and Price Control Board. Together González and Recabarren had 6 children, including Luis Emilio González Recabarren, a former union leader and graphic design technician, and Manuel Guillermo González Recabarren, a plumber or gasfitter. Luis Emilio married Nalvia Rosa Mena Alvarado, a Communist Youth activist and housewife.

== Activism ==
=== Forced disappearance of relatives ===
On 29 April 1976 at approximately 7:30 pm, Mena Alvarado and 2 year old Luis Emilio "Porotito" Recabarren Mena arrived, following a prenatal checkup and a visit to her mothers, at the Santiago print shop where the González Recabarren brothers worked. Both brothers and Mena Alvarado were members of the Communist Party.

At approximately 9 pm the family was arrested at a bus stop on Avenida Santa Rosa by DINA agents. During the arrest Mena Alvarado, who was 3 months pregnant and holding Recabarren Mena in her arms, was beaten in the stomach with the butt of a machine gun and rendered unconscious. Luis Emilio and Manuel Guillermo were beaten and the family was separated into three separate vehicles, with Recabarren Mena being separated from his parents and paternal uncle. Recabarren Mena was later abandoned by DINA agents near the family home at around 11:30 pm, and was discovered and returned home by a neighbour who heard him crying. The brothers and Mena Alvarado were subsequently taken to the Villa Grimaldi, Cuartel Simón Bolívar and Cuatro Álamos DINA detention and torture centres. On 30 April around 7:10 am, Recabarren Rojas was arrested by DINA agents as he attempted to board a bus to search for his missing relatives. Recabarren Rojas was taken to the Villa Grimaldi detention center, and was last seen in August 1976.

The remains of Nalvia Rosa Mena Alvarado, Luis Emilio González Recabarren, Manuel Guillermo González Recabarren and Manuel Segundo Recabarren Rojas have never been located. Lists kept by the Chilean Army suggest that body of Luis Emilio González Recabarren was thrown into the sea during a death flight.

=== Legal action ===
González reported her relatives disappearances to the Vicariate of Solidarity on 30 April, and a recurso de amparo was subsequently filed at the Santiago Court of Appeals on the behalf the Recabarren González brothers, Mena Alvarado and Recabarren Rojas. On 1 June 1976, the Court rejected the Recabarren González family appeal without further action.

In June 2000, González filed a formal complaint against Augusto Pinochet for the disappearance of her family 26 years prior.

=== Association of Relatives of the Disappeared Detainees ===
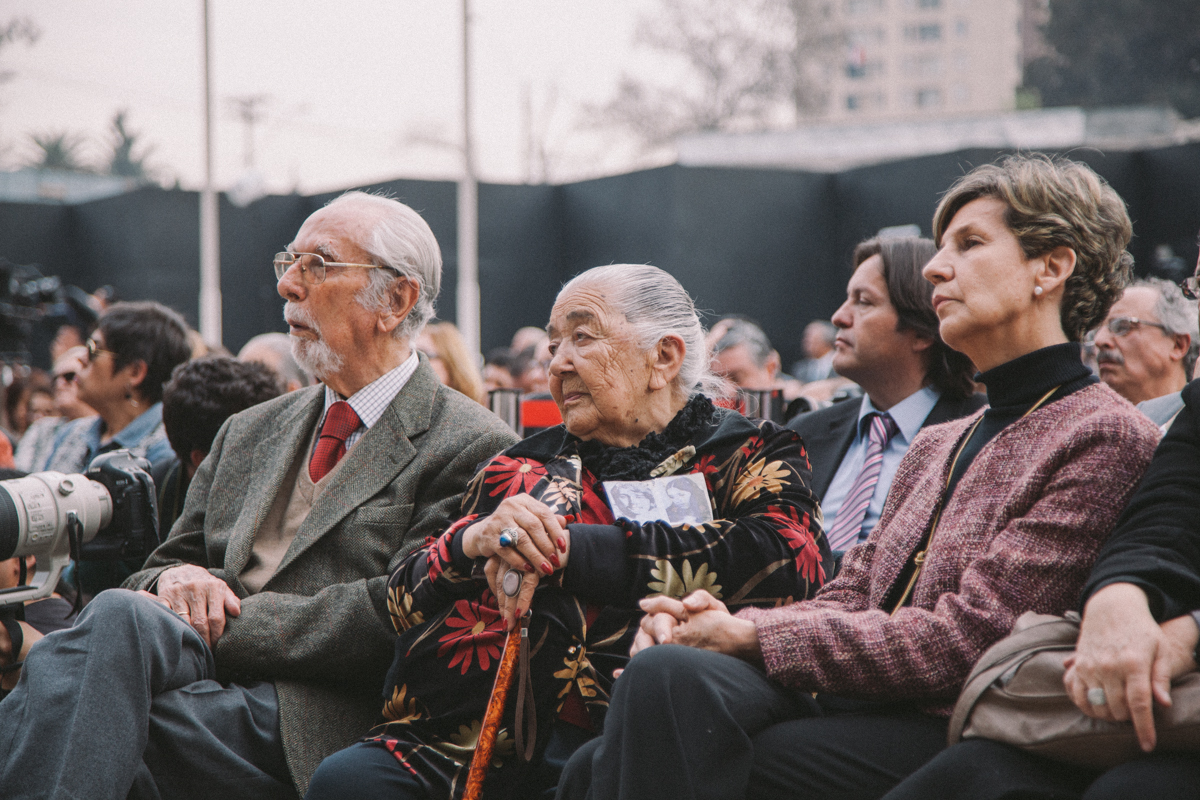
Andrés Aylwin, Ana González de Recabarren (centre) and Isabel Allende at the Museum of Memory and Human Rights 40th anniversary of the 1973 Chilean coup d'état, 2013

Following the forced disappearance of her relatives, González joined the Association of Relatives of the Disappeared Detainees (AFDD) and became one of its primary leaders alongside Sola Sierra, Viviana Díaz, and Clotario Blest. She participated in a hunger strike at the United Nations Economic Commission for Latin America and the Caribbean headquarters in Santiago. With Gabriela Bravo and Ulda Ortiz, González represented the AFDD at various international organizations such as United Nations, Organization of American States, International Red Cross, International Commission of Jurists, the Holy See, and Amnesty International.

In 1996, she was the focus of the Televisión Nacional de Chile-broadcast documentary Quiero llorar a mares and in 2001 won the Premios Ondas for Ibero-America for the Best Program or Professional or Television Station.

== Personal life ==
On 26 October 2018, González died aged 93 at San José Hospital in Santiago, Chile. González is buried at the Cementerio Católico de Santiago.
