= Human Rights Archive of Chile =

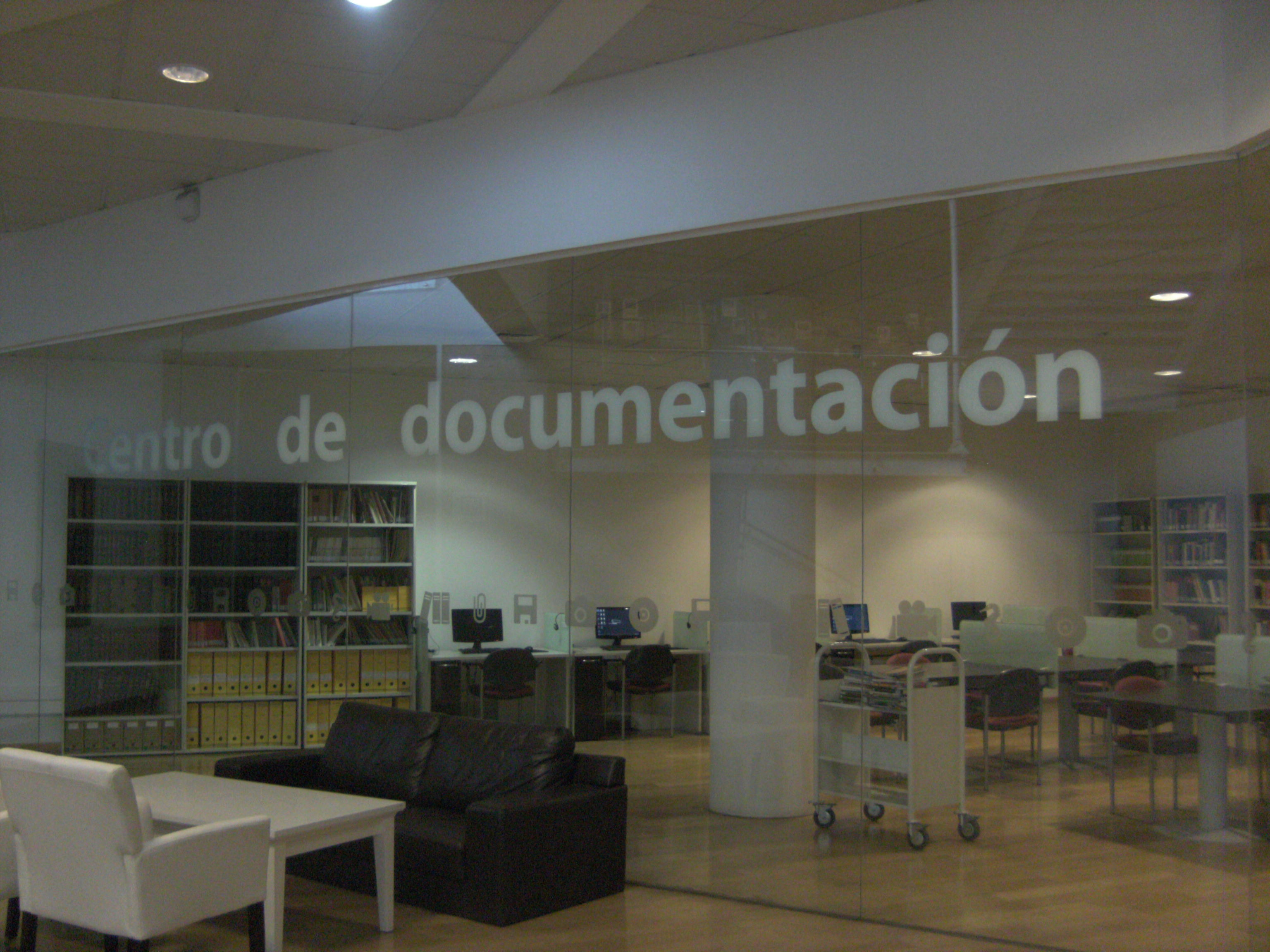

The Human Rights Archive of Chile is a documentary archive containing information on human rights violations during the Chilean military dictatorship. It was added to the UNESCO Memory of the World international register in August 2003. The archive has been used as evidence in human rights cases.

== Content ==
The archive contains information about 3,877 human rights violation cases that were heard by Chile's Truth and Reconciliation Commission. This includes around a thousand photographs of missing detainees, as well as audiovisual and press material published between 1973 and 1995 on human rights violations committed during the regime of Augusto Pinochet. It also includes editions of the news program Teleanálisis.

The records that make up the archive belong to eight institutions:

- Association of Families of the Detained-Disappeared (AFDD)
- Corporation for the Promotion and Defense of People's Rights (Codepu)
- Vicariate of Solidarity
- Justice and Democracy Corporation
- Foundation for Social Aid of Christian Churches (Fasic)
- Foundation for the Protection of Children Victims of States of Emergency (Pidee)
- Chilean Commission on Human Rights
- Teleanálisis

In 2002 the archive was nominated for the UNESCO Memory of the World international register, to which it was accepted in 2003. The nomination statement argued that protecting the archive was important for maintaining wider discussion about democracy: "To understand the raison d’être of democracy and respect for human rights, it is necessary to know and remember how the dictatorships functioned."

In the following years, the families and organisations who had contributed to the archive campaigned for the government to give it a permanent home. When the Museum of Memory and Human Rights was opened in January 2010, the archive became one of its collections.

== See also ==
- Documentation and Archive Foundation of the Vicariate of Solidarity
