= Association of Families of the Detained-Disappeared =

Chilean human rights group

- Agrupación de Familiares de Detenidos Desaparecidos
- Formation: 1975; 51 years ago
- Founder: Clotario Blest
- Founded at: Santiago
- Type: human rights organization
- Official language: Spanish

The Association of Families of the Detained-Disappeared (AFDD) (Spanish: Agrupación de Familiares de Detenidos Desaparecidos), is a Chilean human rights group that formed in Santiago in 1974 in the wake of detentions and disappearances of thousands of people by the military dictatorship of General Augusto Pinochet.

The main focus of the group was to maintain awareness of the desaparecidos in the public eye, and to pressure the regime to release information about them. The goals and pressure brought to bear by the Association played an influential role in the establishment of the Truth and Reconciliation Commission after the reestablishment of democracy in Chile and the 1989 election of President Patricio Aylwin.

== Background ==
On 11 September 1973 a military junta toppled President Salvador Allende in a coup d'état and installed General Augusto Pinochet as head of the new regime. This was a dictatorial, authoritarian regime which trampled on human rights with the use of torture, disappearances, illegal and secret arrest, and extrajudicial killings. Thousands were being detained, and hundreds killed by the regime. It was in this context, that the first opposition to the Pinochet regime appeared in 1973, when several religious groups led by the Archdiocese of Santiago organized the Committee of Cooperation for Peace in Chile in 1973 in order to support human rights of those persecuted by the regime of General Augusto Pinochet.

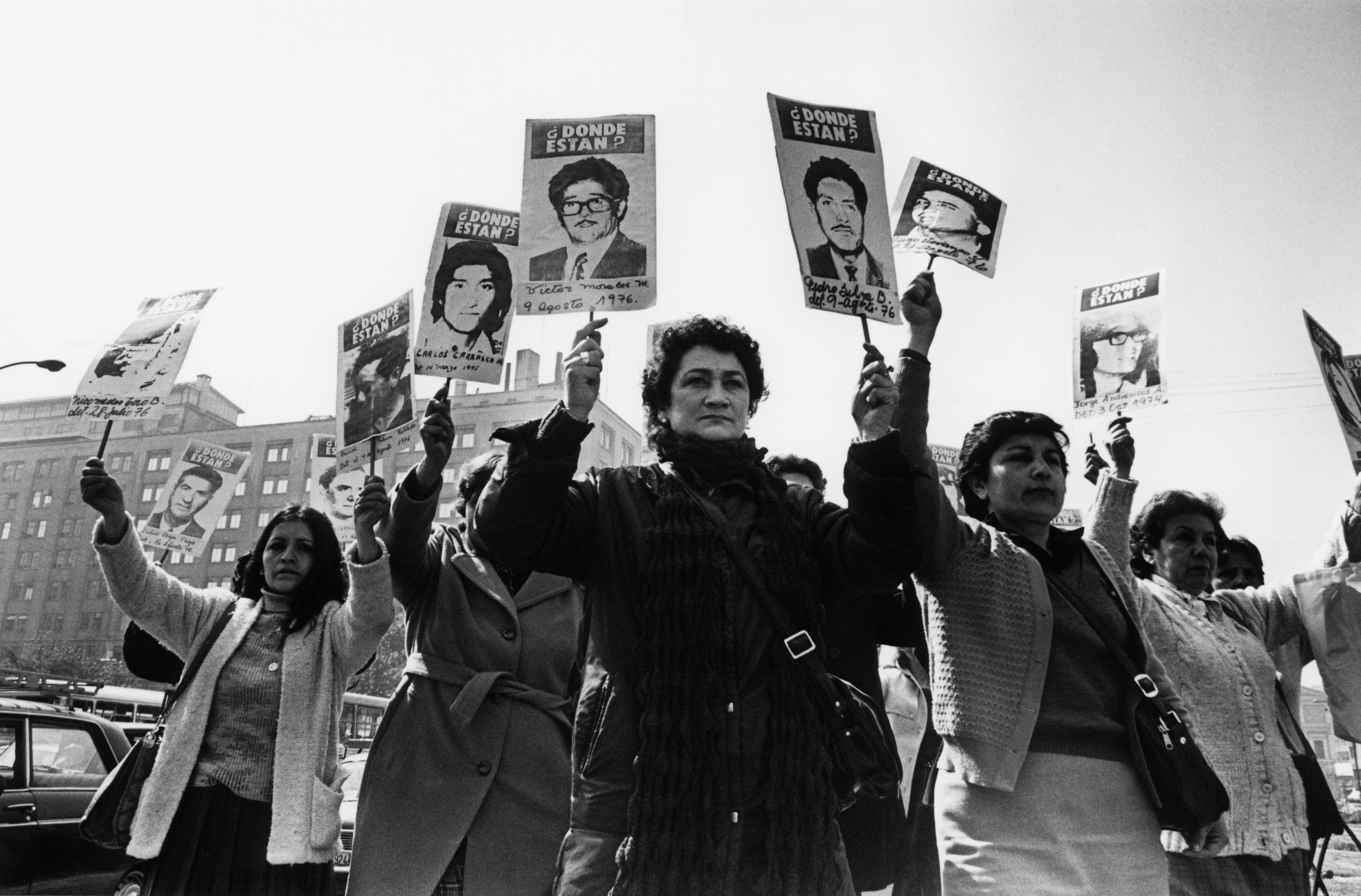
Women of the Association of Families of the Detained-Disappeared demonstrate in front of La Moneda Palace during the Pinochet military regime.

== Founding ==
At the end of 1974, a group of mostly women applied to the Committee of Cooperation for Peace in Chile to find out the whereabouts of their missing family members, the desaparecidos (Engl: the disappeared), who had been detained or killed by the brutal Pinochet regime. The new Association coalesced unofficially out of this group of people. Clotario Blest formally established the Association of Families of the Detained-Disappeared in 1975 out of his home in central Santiago.

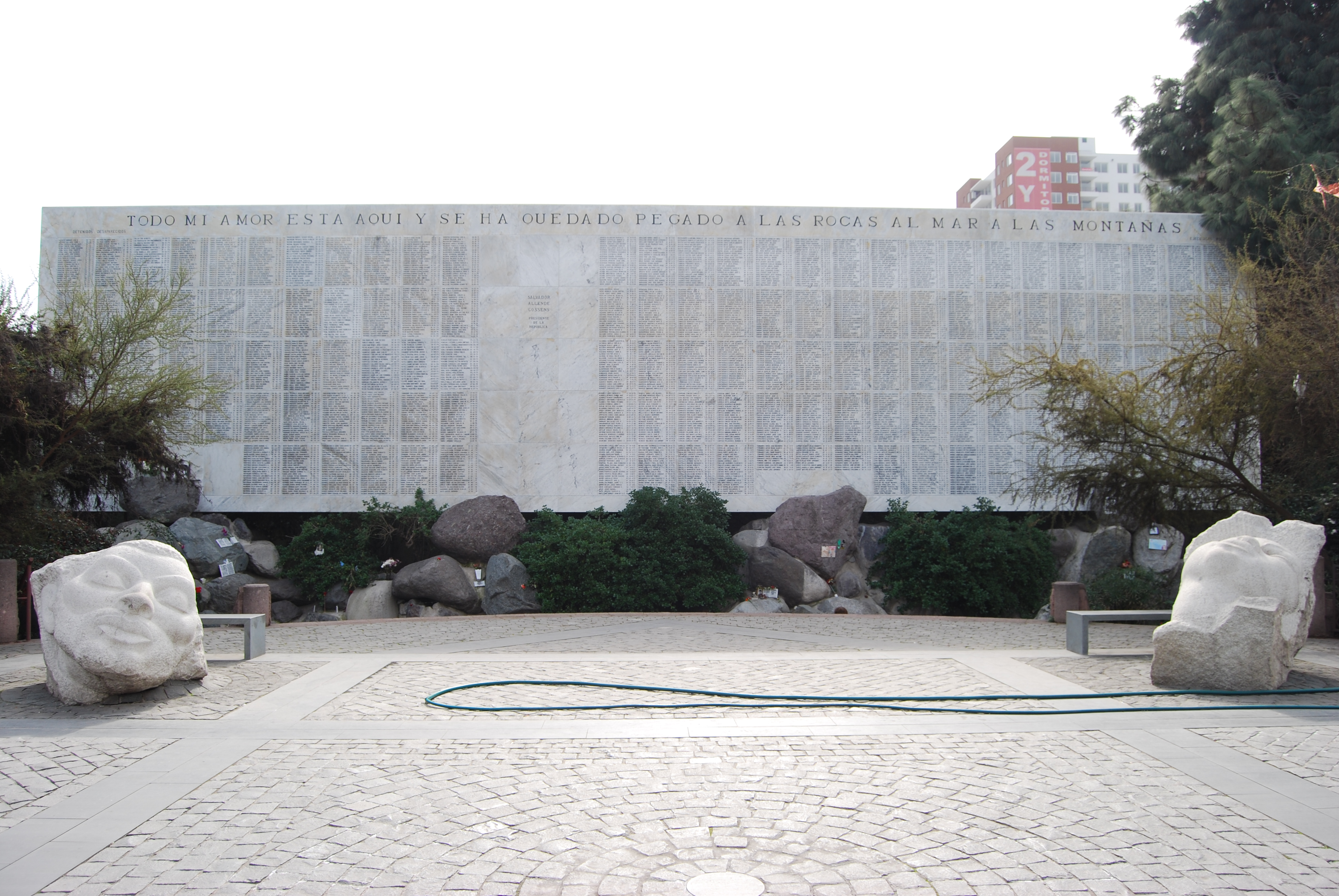
Memorial to the desaparecidos in the Cementerio General de Santiago

== Activities ==
After the opening of the notorious detention centers like Tres Álamos failed to produce any leads about their missing kin, they staged several hunger strikes to pressure the government into giving out information. In 1978, UNICEF and the Catholic Church became involved, and sent information about 613 cases to the Ministry of the Interior but there was no reply. In December, bodies of some of the desaparecidos were found in Lonquén. They had been seen being taken away by uniformed men in 1973. In February 1979, the group made a pilgrimage to the site where the bodies had been found.

In order to try to pressure the government to release information, members of the group chained themselves to the fence of the National Congress, where the Ministry of Justice was located. There was no response from the government.

== Return to Democracy ==
The Chilean return to democracy culminated in March 1990 with the election of Patricio Aylwin as President. The Association was represented in the ceremonies on inauguration day, March 11, 1990, and in the celebrations at the National Stadium of Chile the next day. The pressure they applied for information about the desparecidos played a key role in the establishment of the Truth and Reconciliation Commission under the new administration.

During the period of military rule under the Pinochet government, the Association never ceased searching for information about the detention and destiny of their family members, in the face of continual silence or rebuffs from the government. With the advent of democracy, this goal did not change but now that they had a democratically elected president sympathetic to their goals, the focus of how best to achieve their goals shifted. Both the Association and the new government sought a public airing of the facts of disappearances as state policy during the Pinochet years, establishment of human rights as a basic value and distinguishing factor between dictatorship and democracy. But they didn't agree on how best to advance and balance the goals of truth and justice. In addition to continuing their public demonstrations to raise and maintain awareness, they now also held meetings with high officials, including Justice Minister Cumplido, Interior Minister Krauss, and President Aylwin.

Aylwin strongly supported the Commission, which exposed the government's brutal repression of its citizens during the military dictatorship.

== See also ==
- APSI
- Arpilleras
- Caravan of Death
- Catholic Church in Chile
- Documentation and Archive Foundation of the Vicariate of Solidarity
- 1973 Chilean coup d'état
- Government Junta of Chile (1973)
- Human rights in Chile
- Human rights violations in Pinochet's Chile
- List of human rights organizations in Chile
- Los archivos del cardenal
- Military dictatorship of Chile (1973–90)
- Operation Condor
- Religion in Chile
- Rettig Report
- They Dance Alone
- Valech Report
- Vicariate of Solidarity
