= Committee of Cooperation for Peace in Chile =

Chilean peace organization (1973–1975)

- Comité de Cooperación para la Paz en Chile, Comité Pro Paz
- Successor: Vicariate of Solidarity
- Formation: October 9, 1973
- Founder: Raul Silva Henriquez
- Founded at: Santiago
- Dissolved: November 11, 1975
- Type: human rights organization
- Purpose: legal support; human rights
- Region served: Chile
- Official language: Spanish

The Committee of Cooperation for Peace in Chile (Spanish: Comité de Cooperación para la Paz) was a Chilean peace organization founded in October 1973 by an inter-religious group led by the Archdiocese of Santiago in order to support human rights of those persecuted by the regime of General Augusto Pinochet.

It was the first active human rights organization in Chile and it lasted for two years, supporting thousands of people persecuted by the regime. It dissolved under pressure from the regime in November 1975, but the Vicariate of Solidarity was formed in its wake shortly thereafter, and it took up the baton of protection of human rights in Chile.

== Background ==
On 11 September 1973 a military junta toppled President Salvador Allende in a coup d'état and installed General Augusto Pinochet as head of the new regime. This was a dictatorial, authoritarian regime which trampled on human rights with the use of torture, disappearances, illegal and secret arrest, and extrajudicial killings. Thousands were being detained, and hundreds killed by the regime. It was in this context, that the first opposition to the Pinochet regime appeared.

== Founding ==
The first organized opposition to the regime came from the churches. The committee, more commonly known as "Committee for Peace" (Spanish: Comité Pro Paz; also Comité Pro Paz en Chile) was founded by the Catholic, Methodist, Lutheran, Eastern Orthodox, and Pentecostal Churches, as well as the Jewish community in Chile.

It was formalized by Archbishop Raul Silva Henriquez in Order 158-73 on 9 October 1973, with the goal of "helping Chileans, who, as a result of recent political events, are in dire economic or personal straits," and also to provide "legal, economic, technical, and spiritual" assistance. Its charter also called for ecumenical links to other religions to help carry out its work in favor of those who were persecuted by the regime. The Committee carried out its pro-human rights activity in the face of harassment and intimidation by the government, and was a risky proposition for those involved.

A year later, a couple dozen members of the committee, mostly women who were looking for their "disappeared" relatives, went on to form a new group focused on pressuring the government for information about their "disappeared" relatives. This was formalized into a new group, the Association of Families of the Detained-Disappeared by Clotario Blest the next year.

== Activities ==
The chief activity of the Committee of Cooperation for Peace in Chile was the legal support for those persecuted by the government, as well as people arrested for political reasons without a trial. It also played a support role for those who lost their job for political reasons, and provided medical care. In the two years of its operation, it provided legal services to over 17,000 people, and medical care for an equal number.

== Links with other groups ==
The Committee was the first such human rights group, but others followed, to the point where there were at least fifteen human rights groups operating in Chile by the mid-1980s. One that grew directly out of the Committee, was the Association of Families of the Detained-Disappeared.

At the end of 1974, a group of mostly women applied to the Committee for Peace to find out the whereabouts of their missing family members, the desaparecidos (the disappeared), who had been detained or killed. The Association of Families of the Detained-Disappeared coalesced unofficially out of this group of people. Clotario Blest formally established the group in 1975 out of her home in central Santiago.

== Dissolution ==
When the Committee was dissolved at the demand of the government. At the same time as the government was arresting its lawyers, Pinochet wrote to Cardinal Raul Silva Henriquez on 11 November 1975 claiming that the Committee was being "used by Marxist-Leninists" to cause an appearance of division between the government and the Roman Catholic Church, and used this as an excuse to demand its dissolution.

== Follow-up ==
The Archbishop established its successor organization, the Vicariate of Solidarity in January 1976, which took over the responsibility of defending human rights in Chile and was less subject to pressure than the Committee for Peace had been, because it was under the full protection of the Roman Catholic Church.

== See also ==
- APSI
- Los archivos del cardenal
- Association of Families of the Detained-Disappeared
- Documentation and Archive Foundation of the Vicariate of Solidarity
- 1973 Chilean coup d'état
- Government Junta of Chile (1973)
- Human rights in Chile
- Human rights violations in Pinochet's Chile
- Military dictatorship of Chile (1973–90)
- Operation Condor
- Religion in Chile
- Rettig Report
- Valech Report
