= Las Bordadoras de Isla Negra =

Chilean women's sewing group

Las Bordadoras de Isla Negra (English: The Embroiderers of Isla Negra) were a women's sewing group from the coastal town of Isla Negra, Chile. The group achieved worldwide recognition in the late-1960s and early-1970s for embroidered tapestries that depicted scenes from the women's personal experience, everyday life, and local and national histories. The group was led by Leonor Sobrino de Vera, an artist and prominent resident of Isla Negra. The naïve art pieces produced by the Bordadoras were well-received locally, nationally, and internationally. In the years following two successful exhibits in Chile, the women's tapestries would be exhibited at museums and galleries around the world, including the Gallerie du Passeur in Paris and the Institute for Contemporary Arts in London. The Bordadoras de Isla Negra are said to have influenced the more well-known Chilean arpillerista groups of the 1970s (who were known for their arpilleras), though there is some disagreement as to the validity of such claims.

The group was still active as of 2016.
