= Peace committee =

Organization

A peace committee is an association of persons who support peace in a situation of conflict. Many such groups have existed. Some are associations of concerned persons; some are propaganda fronts for national, sectional, or sectarian interests; others are devoted to disputes within organizations. This is a very incomplete list:

== International committees ==
- World Peace Congress, a "non-governmental organization dedicated to constructing an institutional basis for world peace", 2007–present
- World Peace Council, an organization that advocates "universal disarmament, sovereignty and independence and peaceful co-existence", 1950–present
- Soviet Peace Committee or Soviet Committee for the Defense of Peace, a committee of the U.S.S.R., 1949–1991
- Peace Council (Ghana) (https://www.peacecouncil.org), a group of spiritual leaders who "work for the common cause of humanity", 1995–present
- Women's International League for Peace and Freedom, founded in 1915 during World War I, advocates "world disarmament, full rights for women, racial and economic justice, an end to all forms of violence".
- Board of Peace (BoP), intergovernmental organization chaired by Donald Trump

== National and local committees ==
- East Pakistan Central Peace Committee, a group opposed to the rebellion that resulted in the independence war of East Pakistan (now Bangladesh) in 1971
- Australian Peace Committee, "aimed at promoting disarmament, human rights, justice, development and peace"
- Committee for a Just Peace in Israel and Palestine, advancing "the cause of peace and justice for both Palestinians and Israelis"
- Comité Pro Paz, an interreligious group founded in Chile in 1973 to oppose the Pinochet regime's human rights abuses; gave way to the Vicariate of Solidarity in 1976

== Intra-organizational committees ==
- Southern Baptist Convention Peace Committee (http://www.baptist2baptist.net/b2barticle.asp?id=65), a committee to resolve conflicts within the Southern Baptist Convention, 1987
