= Human rights in Chile =

Concerns about human rights in Chile include discrimination against indigenous populations; societal violence and discrimination against women, children, and lesbian, gay, bisexual, and transgender (LGBT) people; child labor; and harsh prison conditions and treatment. Additional human rights concerns in the country include use of excessive force and abuse by security forces, isolated reports of government corruption, and antisemitism. Authorities generally maintain effective control over the security forces. However, security forces occasionally commit human rights abuses. The government generally takes steps to prosecute officials who commit abuses. Nevertheless, many human rights organizations contend that security officials accused of committing abuses have impunity.

Human rights violations by the military and security forces in Chile were widespread during the rule of General Augusto Pinochet (1973–1990). Estimates of the number killed and "disappeared" during the Pinochet regime range as high as 17,000.

== History ==
=== Background ===
Early efforts for human rights in Latin America grew out of the Catholic Church. Major social breakdowns in Latin America had increased the number of human rights violations. The feelings of many Latin Americans had changed, with a concern for human rights growing out of their Catholic faith. According to Oxfam, the "vast majority" of citizen advocates first acquired experience in taking control of their lives through Christian communities in the 1960s and 1970s. Advocates of human rights criticize governments and attempt to raise public awareness of government repression, torture, and denial of habeas corpus. These efforts were spurred on by the Medellin Conference of Catholic bishops in 1968, itself a response to Vatican II. The bishops urged the church to "favor the efforts of the people to create and develop their own grassroots organizations for the redress and consolidation of their rights."

Human rights organizations in Latin America were unknown or existed only on paper before the 1960s. In Chile, the tiny Committee for the Defense of Human Rights led by labor leader Clotario Blest existed in 1972, a year before the coup but was inactive. Movements to defend human rights in Latin America lagged behind the military takeovers, with the exception of Chile, where activities in response to the 1973 Chilean coup d'etat began almost immediately.

=== 1973 coup d'etat ===
On 11 September 1973 a military junta toppled President Salvador Allende in a coup d'état and installed General Augusto Pinochet as head of the new regime. This was a dictatorial, authoritarian regime which trampled on human rights with the use of torture, disappearances, illegal and secret arrest, and extrajudicial killings. Thousands were being detained, and hundreds killed by the regime. It was in this context, that the first organized opposition to the Pinochet regime appeared.

=== 1970s NGOs ===
Opposition to the military dictatorship began within days of the coup, and the first organization appeared within a month. As was the case elsewhere, this began in Chile with the Catholic Church.

The first organized opposition to the regime came from the churches. The Committee of Cooperation for Peace in Chile was founded by five Christian churches and the Jewish community in Chile on 9 October 1973 and led by Archbishop Raul Silva Henriquez with a stated goal of "helping Chileans, who, as a result of recent political events, are in dire economic or personal straits," and also to provide "legal, economic, technical, and spiritual" assistance. The Committee for Peace carried out its human rights activity in the face of harassment and intimidation by the government, and was a risky proposition for those involved. In the two years of its operation, it provided support for 17,000 people persecuted by the government, as well as people detained for political reasons without trial. It also played a support role for those who lost their job for political reasons, and provided medical care. The committee was shut down under direct pressure from Pinochet in November 1975, but it contained the seeds for the founding of other organizations.

The Association of Families of the Detained-Disappeared (AFDD) is a Chilean human rights group that coalesced in Santiago in 1974 and was launched formally by Clotario Blest in 1975. It grew out of a group of members, mostly women, of the Committee of Cooperation for Peace in Chile. The main focus of the AFDD was to maintain awareness of the desaparecidos (English: the disappeared) in the public eye, and to pressure the government to release information about them. After the reestablishment of democracy in Chile and the 1989 election of President Patricio Aylwin, the goals and pressure brought to bear by the AFDD on the new, democratic government played an influential role in the establishment of the Truth and Reconciliation Commission in 1990.

== Respect for the integrity of the person ==
=== Arbitrary or unlawful deprivation of life ===
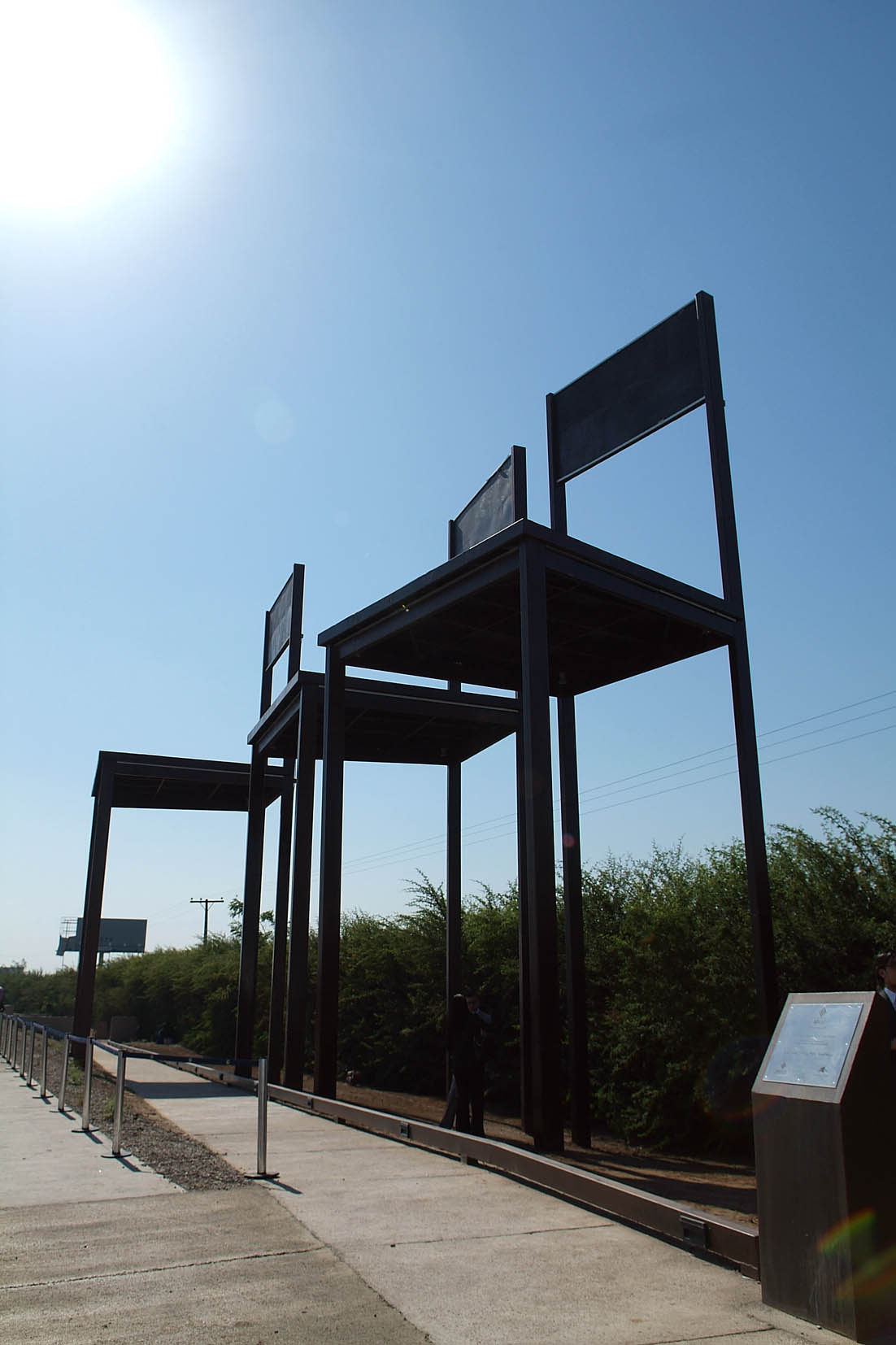
A monument inaugurated in 2006 to commemorate the Caso Degollados, the slaying by police forces of three Communist Party members in 1985.

There were no reports that the government or its agents committed arbitrary or unlawful killings during 2013. The external mechanism to investigate abuses by Carabineros is the military justice system, while the regular criminal justice system investigates accusations of abuse by investigative police (PDI) officers.

On January 3, authorities arrested six of eight former army officers indicted for the 1973 torture and subsequent execution of singer Victor Jara in the Estadio Chile in Santiago. On March 28, the Santiago Appellate Court approved bail for four of the eight. On October 11, the judge indicted and arrested a ninth former army officer. The case remained pending at year's end.

In June 2012 the Santiago Appellate Court ruled that Judge Mario Carroza should investigate the killing of U.S. citizen Ronnie Moffit in a Washington, D.C. car bombing in 1976. The case was pending at year's end.

According to the Diego Portales University (UDP) Law School's 2013 annual report on human rights, as of July the Supreme Court had ruled in 153 criminal cases of dictatorship-era human rights violations and confirmed 140 convictions, while 1,350 cases against more than 800 perpetrators remained under investigation or pending in the courts.

On March 25, a military prosecutor indicted former Carabinero sergeant Miguel Millacura for using unnecessary force and Lieutenant Claudia Iglesias for complicity in covering up Carabinero involvement in the 2011 killing of 16-year-old Manuel Gutierrez. Millacura was free on bail, and Iglesias reportedly continued on active duty. The status of the case in the military justice system against Millacura was unknown at year's end. Cases involving alleged unlawful conduct by Carabineros, including human rights abuses against civilians, were generally tried in the military court system, as were allegations where the accused is a member of the armed forces.

=== Disappearance ===
There were no reports of politically motivated disappearances.

In August 2012 Judge Jorge Zepeda indicted eight former Carabineros and army patrol members for aggravated kidnapping in the 1985 disappearance case of U.S. citizen Boris Weisfeiler. The case remained pending at year's end; those charged remained free on bail.

=== Torture and other cruel, inhuman, or degrading treatment or punishment ===
Although the constitution prohibits such practices, credible nongovernmental organizations (NGOs) received multiple reports of excessive force, abuse, and degrading treatment by Carabineros, PDI members, and prison guards, few of which resulted in convictions.

On June 13, 2013 Carabineros entered the downtown central campus of the University of Chile, allegedly without authorization and in a violent manner, in search of connections to several violent activities that took place the day before during an authorized student protest. According to the local press, police seriously injured two female students resisting the unauthorized entrance. The head of the police unit involved was transferred to another unit after an internal investigation revealed a violation of protocol regarding the use of force. No further disciplinary action was taken.

On December 30, 2013 PDI officer Flavio Torres was charged in a Santiago court for unlawful coercion and computer crimes for his alleged role in the beating during the interrogation of a minor following a student protest in May. Torres was accused of participating in a group of approximately 10 officers who struck the minor's neck and face, photographed him in his underwear, and forced him to reveal his Facebook log-in credentials. The prosecutor said she was unable to determine the identities of others alleged to have been involved due to the invocation by the PDI of a provision of the country's National Intelligence Law. The judge, who remanded Torres into custody during the case's investigative phase, called the alleged crimes “among the most serious” contemplated by Chile's laws because they involved a state agent. The case was pending at year's end.

The National Institute of Human Rights (INDH) and media outlets reported on the alleged inappropriate use of force by prison guards in breaking up a protest at a prison in Valdivia in January 2013, resulting in injuries to 21 inmates. The Court of Appeals of Valdivia subsequently made a special order of protection on behalf of the inmates. The Court of Appeals of Antofagasta ruled that prison guards violated the constitutional rights of 10 inmates and breached the Convention Against Torture and Other Cruel, Inhuman or Degrading Treatment or Punishment during a violent encounter in July when the guards beat and shot pellets at prisoners, resulting in injuries.

==== Prison and detention center conditions ====
Prison conditions were harsh. Human rights organizations reported that violence, including torture, occurred and that prison officials were aware of the problem and worked to address it. Violence among inmates was also common.

Physical Conditions: Prisons were overcrowded. The government reported that at the end of September 2013, 45,510 prisoners were in prisons designed to hold 41,034 inmates. Prisoners included 3,540 women (held in separate sections of the same facilities as men or in separate facilities). At the end of August, 3,054 minors were in prisons or detention centers (held separately from the adult population). Many prisons were antiquated and offered substandard sanitary conditions, inadequate food, and insufficient medical services. Inadequate heating in some prisons remained a serious problem, and inadequate lighting and ventilation also affected inmates at some prisons. The government reported that access to potable water was limited in several prisons.

Officials reported 186 prisoner deaths during 2013. Violence among inmates accounted for 67 deaths, while three inmates died while attempting to escape prison. On August 13, a fire broke out in a prison in Quillota, located near the coastal city of Valparaiso, after two rival gangs started a fight. Although the fire was contained, approximately 24 inmates were injured in the incident, five due to stab wounds that occurred during the intergang violence.

Prisoners with HIV/AIDS and mental and physical disabilities reportedly failed to receive adequate medical attention in some prisons. Adequate accommodations for those prisoners with physical disabilities were made.

According to the rights organization Movement for Homosexual Integration and Liberation (MOVILH) and various media outlets, in November 2012 an official commission reported that in several prisons, LGBT prisoners were separated from the general population to prevent possible attacks. The commission noted that these separate facilities were overcrowded and lacked adequate basic hygienic services. Administration: Recordkeeping on prisoners was generally adequate, and authorities used alternative sentencing for nonviolent offenders, such as conditional release for community service. There were no prison ombudsmen. Prisoners and detainees had reasonable access to visitors and could observe their religious practices. Authorities permitted prisoners and detainees to submit complaints to judicial authorities without censorship and to request investigation of inhumane conditions. Authorities generally investigated credible allegations and documented the results in a publicly accessible manner. The government usually investigated and monitored prison and detention center conditions.

Independent Monitoring: The government permitted prison visits by independent human rights observers, and such visits took place at both government and privately operated facilities. Prisoner and human rights groups continued to investigate alleged use of abuse or excessive force against detainees, while the media covered some such allegations.

Improvements: Overcrowding decreased by almost 25 percent as of the end of September 2013, compared with levels at the end of 2012. The government transferred inmates between prisons and issued pardons to certain inmates to reduce overcrowding. Two prisons were completely renovated, while several others underwent repairs and upgrades. Improved health measures were also implemented, including increased spending on meals. Nutritionists were hired to advise on healthy meal plans, leading to new nutrition programs in all prisons. The Human Rights division of the Gendarmeria held human rights-focused workshops, seminars, and other training programs at various prisons for current and future prison guards. The government also carried out an exhaustive survey of inmates from 75 prisons throughout the country to understand prisoners’ perceptions of shortcomings in the penitentiary system, with the ultimate goal of improving the quality of life for prisoners. Based on those results, the Gendarmaria's human rights division planned to create a subdivision to monitor progress in efforts to address deficiencies and promote training of prison system personnel.

Gendarmeria officials participated in two educational sessions organized by NGOs aimed at instilling in prison employees respect for diversity and skills for handling LGBT-related issues in prisons. The Gendarmeria and MOVILH signed an agreement in December 2013 to facilitate the voluntary work of certain prisoners for MOVILH, with the aim of enhancing the quality of life for LGBT prisoners by increasing tolerance in more of the general prison population through education and exposure to LGBT-related matters.

The National Institute of Human Rights noted marked improvement in overall prison conditions.

=== Arbitrary arrest or detention ===
The constitution prohibits arbitrary arrest and detention, and the government generally observed these prohibitions.

==== Role of the police and security apparatus ====
Carabineros and the PDI have responsibility in law and practice for law enforcement and maintenance of order within the country. The Ministry of the Interior oversees both forces.

Civilian authorities generally maintained effective control over Carabineros and the PDI, and the government has mechanisms to investigate and punish abuse and corruption. There were allegations of impunity involving security forces during 2013. Cases from prior years remained pending in courts, while rights organizations criticized the security apparatus for failing to carry out sufficient internal reviews of allegations of abuse by their members and to take forceful enough action where wrongdoing was established. The 2012 Human Rights Watch country report noted continued concern that military courts were not fully independent and that investigations and trials of police accused of abuses against civilians continued to be conducted under the military justice system.

The external mechanism to investigate abuses by Carabineros is the military justice system, while accusations of abuses by PDI officers are investigated in the regular criminal justice system. The INDH stated in its 2013 annual report that there were 1,775 complaints against Carabineros in 2012 for “unnecessary violence” but that less than 2 percent of that number ended in convictions in the military justice system during the period. Carabineros accused of use of “unnecessary violence” are often reassigned within the institution where an internal investigation reveals wrongdoing. The INDH reported that government actions to reform the security forces were lacking.

==== Arrest procedures and treatment of detainees ====
Only public officials expressly authorized by law can arrest or detain citizens and generally did so openly with warrants based on sufficient evidence brought before an independent judiciary. Authorities must immediately inform a prosecutor of an arrest and generally did so.

The prosecutor must open an investigation, receive a statement from the detainee, and ensure that the detainee is held at a local police station until the detention control hearing. Detention control hearings are held twice daily, allowing for a judicial determination of the legality of the detention within 24 hours of arrest. Detainees must be informed of their rights, including the right to an attorney and the right to remain silent until an attorney is present. Public defenders are provided to detainees who do not hire their own lawyer. Authorities must expedite notification of the detention to family members. If authorities do not inform the detainees of their rights upon detention, during the detention control hearing the judge can declare the process unlawful.

The law allows judges to set bail, grant provisional liberty, or order continued detention as necessary for the investigation or the protection of the prisoner or the public. The law affords detainees 30 minutes of immediate and subsequent daily access to a lawyer (in the presence of a prison guard) and to a doctor to verify their physical condition. Regular visits by family members are allowed.

Pretrial Detention: Through September an average of 150 days passed between the time of arrest and presentation of charges against persons accused of a crime.

=== Fair public trials ===
The constitution provides for an independent judiciary, and the government generally respected judicial independence.

The constitution and law provide for the right to a fair trial, and an independent judiciary generally enforced this right.

Defendants enjoy a presumption of innocence and have a right of appeal. They have the right to be informed promptly of charges, have time to prepare their defense, and not be compelled to testify. The law provides for the right to a fair trial, and an independent judiciary generally enforced this right. National and regional prosecutors investigate crimes, formulate charges, and prosecute cases. Three-judge panels form the court of first instance. The process is oral and adversarial; trials are public; defendants have the right to be present and consult with an attorney in a timely manner; and judges rule on guilt and dictate sentences. Defendants do not enjoy the right to a trial by jury. Court records, rulings, and findings were generally accessible to the public.

The law provides for the right to legal counsel, and public defenders’ offices across the country provided professional legal counsel to anyone seeking such assistance. When human rights organizations or family members requested, the NGO Corporation for the Promotion and Defense of the Rights of the People and other lawyers working pro bono assisted detainees during interrogation and trial. Defendants can confront or question adverse witnesses and present witnesses and evidence on their behalf, although the law provides for secret witnesses in certain circumstances. Defendants and their attorneys generally have access to government-held evidence relevant to their cases.

For crimes committed prior to the implementation of the 2005 judicial reforms, criminal proceedings are inquisitorial rather than adversarial. At end 2013 one inquisitorial criminal court remained open and had an extensive wait for trials.

=== Political prisoners and detainees ===
There were no reports of political prisoners or detainees, although some indigenous Mapuche convicted of criminal offenses claimed to be political prisoners.

=== Civil judicial procedures and remedies ===
There is an independent and impartial judiciary in civil matters, which permits individuals to seek civil remedies for human rights violations; however, the civil justice system retained antiquated and inefficient procedures. The average civil trial lasted approximately five years, and civil suits could continue for decades. Administrative and judicial remedies are available for alleged wrongs. Cases involving violations of an individual's human rights may be submitted through petitions by individuals or organizations to the Inter-American Commission of Human Rights (IACHR), which in turn may submit the case to the Inter-American Court of Human Rights. The court can order civil remedies including fair compensation to the individual injured.

=== Regional human rights court decisions ===
Chile is subject to the jurisdiction of the Inter-American Court for Human Rights. On August 28, 2013 the court determined that the government was guilty of “undue delay” in investigating the exoneration claim of Leopoldo Garcia, who was tortured and exiled under the Pinochet government and submitted his request in 1993. The court ordered Chile to pay $32,000 in moral damages and to complete his investigation in a reasonable time. This was the first time the court ruled on a case involving the living survivor of human rights abuses from the Pinochet era.

=== Interference with privacy, family, home, or correspondence ===
The constitution prohibits arbitrary interference with privacy, family, home, or correspondence, and the government generally respected these prohibitions.

== Respect for civil liberties ==
=== Freedom of speech and the press ===
The constitution provides for freedom of speech and press, and the government generally respected these rights. An independent press, an effective judiciary, and a functioning democratic political system combined to promote freedom of speech and of the press.

Although the independent media were active and expressed a wide variety of views without restriction, the 2013 Freedom House and Reporters Without Borders reports expressed concern with media concentration, whereby most media outlets are in the hands of two major family companies, Copesa and El Mercurio, and the unregulated distribution of government funded advertising. No legal framework exists to guarantee fair distributions of frequencies to different broadcast media.

The penal code carries criminal sentences of six months to five years in jail for libel or slander. Press freedom groups called on the government to modify antiterrorism laws to limit their use on Chilean and foreign reporters, for example, on those who covered issues concerning Mapuche communities.

=== Film censorship ===
In 1974, during General Augusto Pinochet's dictatorship (1973–1990), a film censorship decree allowed the banning of films. During the years when film censorship existed in Chile, 1,092 films were banned in the country. The Chilean film censorship system has not changed significantly until November 1996 when after United International Pictures requested that The Last Temptation of Christ be rated, the film was allowed for audiences over 18. However, an ultra-conservative religious group filed an injunction to reverse the decision and in June 1997 the Supreme Court banned the film. In September 1997 a civil liberties group took the case to the Inter-American Commission on Human Rights. In February 2001 the Inter-American Court of Human Rights ruled that Chile was in violation of the American Convention on Human Rights and that it should lift the ban on the film and modify its legislation to comply with the convention. In August 2001 a constitutional reform eliminated film censorship and the film appeared on video stores. In January 2003 a new film rating law was published and the film was given an "over 18" rating. The film premiered on 13 March 2003 at a theater in Santiago.

=== Internet freedom ===
There were no government restrictions on access to the Internet or credible reports that the government monitors e-mail or Internet chat rooms without appropriate legal authority. According to the International Telecommunication Union (ITU), approximately 41 percent of households had access to the Internet in 2012.

=== Academic freedom and cultural events ===
There were no government restrictions on academic freedom or cultural events.

=== Freedom of assembly ===
The government routinely granted permits for marches and demonstrations, occasionally refusing permission for certain routes, citing a concern for public safety. Police used tear gas and water cannons and forcibly removed or detained some protesters when participants vandalized property.

Since the 2019–2021 Chilean protests reports on police brutality have increased, like using rubber bullets to deliberately blind protestors, shooting tear gas shells directly against protestor's bodies, causing serious injuries, unlawful killing of unarmed protestors, rapes inside police building, simulation of executions carried by the Chilean army and tortures, all of these reports are related to protests against the government.

=== Freedom of association ===
The constitution provides for freedom of association, and the government generally respected this right.

=== Freedom of religion ===
This section contains information from the report International Religious Freedom Report for 2012 prepared by the State Department of the United States.

The constitution and other laws and policies protect religious freedom and, in practice, the government generally respected religious freedom. The trend in the government's respect for religious freedom did not change significantly during the year.

There were reports of societal abuses or discrimination based on religious affiliation, belief, or practice. Incidents of antisemitism included online harassment, verbal slurs, and increased vandalism.

U.S. embassy officials discussed religious tolerance with the National Office of Religious Affairs (ONAR) and leaders of numerous religious groups, focusing on the value of deepening institutional cooperation. The embassy organized an iftar with an ecumenical group of religious leaders, and embassy officers attended interfaith events.

==== Government respect for religious freedom ====
The constitution and other laws and policies protect religious freedom. Church and state are officially separate. The law prohibits religious discrimination. The ONAR is part of the executive branch and is responsible for promoting religious freedom and tolerance. The office's mandate is to work with all religious organizations to implement constitutional provisions on religious freedom.

The law allows any religious group to apply for religious nonprofit status. The Ministry of Justice may not refuse to accept a registration petition, although it may object to the petition within 90 days if all legal prerequisites for registration are not satisfied. The petitioner then has 60 days to address objections the ministry raises or challenge the ministry in court. Once registered, the state cannot dissolve a religious entity by decree. The semiautonomous Council for the Defense of the State may initiate a judicial review, but the government has never de-registered a legally registered group. The law allows religious group to adopt a charter and bylaws suited to a religious group rather than a private corporation. Religious groups may establish affiliates (schools, clubs, and sports organizations) without registering them as separate entities. There are more than 2,700 registered religious groups.

An Anti-Discrimination Law approved on July 24 gives civil legal remedies to victims of various types of discrimination, including those based on religion or belief. The law also increases criminal penalties for acts of violence based on discrimination.

Publicly subsidized schools must offer religious education for two teaching hours per week through high school. Parents may have their children excused from religious education. Local school administrators decide how funds are spent on religious instruction. The majority of religious instruction in public schools is Catholic, although the Ministry of Education has approved curricula for 14 other religious groups. Schools must teach the religion requested by the parents. Parents may homeschool their children for religious reasons or enroll them in private schools.

The law grants religious groups the right to have chaplains in public hospitals, prisons, and military units. Regulations for the armed forces and law enforcement agencies allow officially registered religious groups to appoint chaplains to serve in each branch of the armed forces, in the national uniformed police, and the national investigative police.

The ONAR trains clergy of various religions on hospital protocol and issues government identification badges. A new accreditation process implemented in June for representatives of all religions improves the access of hospital patients to their preferred religious representatives. The prison system has both Catholic and Protestant staff chaplains and a large number of volunteer chaplains.

The government observes the following religious holidays as national holidays: Good Friday, the Feast of the Virgin of Carmen, the Feast of Saints Peter and Paul, the Feast of the Assumption, National Day of Evangelical Churches, All Saints’ Day, the Feast of the Immaculate Conception, and Christmas.

==== Government practices ====
There were no reports of abuses of religious freedom.

Catholicism was the dominant religion in public schools, prisons, hospitals, and the military. Representatives from the ONAR held regular roundtable meetings with Protestant leaders to discuss mechanisms to increase Protestant pastoral presence in these institutions. Catholic chaplains outnumbered Protestant chaplains in all branches of the armed forces, and Protestant leaders continued to advocate for more paid chaplain positions.

The celebration of Catholic mass frequently marked official and public events. At military events, all members of participating units were obliged to attend. Government officials attended Catholic events, and major Protestant and Jewish ceremonies.

In October President Pinera announced the appointment of a rabbi as one of three chaplains serving La Moneda Palace, joining the Catholic and Protestant chaplains there. He also thanked the Jewish community for its many contributions to Chilean society. Members of the Jewish Community of Chile (CJCH) told the press the appointment reflected the country's movement toward greater tolerance and diversity.

Enforcement of the requirement to provide non-Catholic education when parents requested it was weak. As part of a two-phase program, ONAR officials traveled to various regions and met with educators and religious leaders to stress that non-Catholic religion classes, specifically Protestant classes, must be offered when requested. The ONAR also provided assistance to municipal offices of religious affairs to develop community-supported curricula in public schools.

==== Societal respect for religious freedom ====
There were reports of societal abuses or discrimination based on religious affiliation, belief, or practice. Antisemitic incidents included verbal slurs, online harassment, and an increase in vandalism. Jewish government officials reported receiving antisemitic correspondence. Authorities and Jewish community groups noted an increase in antisemitic comments, including via social media.

Street protests over education and other social issues led to increased levels of graffiti including swastikas and other expressions of antisemitism in major cities. In January 2012 antisemitic comments in social media spiked following claims that an Israeli tourist had started a forest fire. Protests in response to events in the Middle East, which normally took place at the Israeli embassy, expanded to the CJCH Center. On January 21, three youths beat and verbally harassed a 23-year-old Jewish man at a party in Ritoque. Others at the party refused to assist the victim or to transport him to the hospital. The CJCH condemned the act.

On August 19, 2012 a neo-Nazi group in the Araucania Region attacked a 14-year-old boy and drew a swastika on his stomach with a syringe. In September, coinciding with the Jewish holidays of Yom Kippur and Rosh Hashanah, the CJCH in Santiago reported that vandals marked synagogues and schools with swastikas and the phrase "Juden raus", meaning "Jews out". The Jewish community noted an increase in antisemitism throughout the year and leaders took precautions to ensure their safety.

On August 24, 2012 the president of the Palestinian Federation of South America, which represented more than 300,000 Chileans of Palestinian descent, made anti-Semitic remarks to the media, comparing Zionists to Nazis. Neo-Nazi and skinhead groups engaged in gang-type criminal activities and anti-Semitic rhetoric.

=== Freedom of movement ===
The constitution provides for freedom of internal movement, foreign travel, emigration, and repatriation, and the government generally respected these rights. The government cooperated with the Office of the UN High Commissioner for Refugees and other humanitarian organizations in providing protection and assistance to internally displaced persons, refugees, returning refugees, asylum seekers, stateless persons, and other persons of concern.

=== Protection of refugees ===
The law provides for the granting of asylum or refugee status, and the government has established a system for providing protection to refugees. During the first nine months of 2013, six individuals received recognized refugee status, bringing the total number of refugees living in the country to 1,722.

== Respect for political rights ==
=== The right of citizens to change their government ===
The law provides citizens the right to change their government peacefully, and citizens exercised this right through periodic, free, and fair elections based on universal suffrage.

=== Elections and political participation ===
Recent Elections: On December 15, 2013 Michelle Bachelet was elected president in a free and fair run-off election. On November 17, in elections generally considered free and fair, voters elected 20 of 38 senators and all members of the Chamber of Deputies. A first-round presidential election took place the same day, but no candidate received more than the required 50 percent to win in the first round. For the first time since a June reform law, regional counselors were also elected nationwide. Newly elected officials are to take office in March 2014. In October 2012 mayors and city council members were elected nationwide in free and fair elections, the first following a 2011 change in election laws making voter registration automatic and voting voluntary.

Participation of Women and Minorities: There were 17 women in the 120-seat Chamber of Deputies and five women in the 38-seat Senate. There were six women in the 21-member cabinet. Indigenous people were active at the municipal level. Social, institutional, and cultural barriers limited indigenous participation in national elections, however.

== Corruption and lack of transparency in government ==
The law provides criminal penalties for corruption by officials, and the government generally implemented these laws effectively. There were isolated reports of government corruption during the year, which was more prevalent at the local level than the national level.

Corruption: On July 5, 2013 authorities disclosed that Carabineros deleted wire-tap logs planned for use as evidence in a 2012 case in which 10 PDI detectives were charged with detaining suspects, giving false testimony, drug trafficking, and extortion. The National Prosecutor's Office began an immediate investigation, which delayed proceedings in the 2012 case against Carabineros.

On September 5, 2013 after a three-year investigation, a court convicted the mayor of Hualpen of tax fraud and bribery and sentenced him to three years’ probation, during which he cannot hold public office.

On November 25, 2013 four members of Carabineros were arrested for alleged ties to drug trafficking. In response, Carabineros named a new counternarcotics chief and announced a plan to restructure the counternarcotics department.

The Transparency Council is an autonomous government entity functioning to promote transparency in the public sector, monitor compliance, publish information on public offices, and guarantee access to information. The institution collaborated with civil society, operated effectively and independently, and had sufficient resources. It regularly published statistics on government compliance with the 2009 transparency law.

Whistleblower Protection: The law provides protection to public and private employees for making disclosures of illegality through the National Public Defender's Office or the local police. Few cases have been brought under the law.

Financial Disclosure: A regulation subjects public officials to financial disclosure and assigns responsibility to the comptroller for conducting audits of government agencies and to the Public Prosecutor's Office for initiating criminal investigations of official corruption. The law requires that all declarations be made public, provides sanctions for noncompliance, and clearly identifies which assets must be declared; however, it does not mandate a unit to monitor disclosures.

Public Access to Information: The constitution requires the government and its agencies to make all unclassified information about their activities available to the public. The government granted citizens and noncitizens, including foreign media, access to all unclassified information. The law regulates government transparency and provides public access to information. The law applies to ministries; regional, provincial, and municipal level governments; the armed forces, police, and public security forces; and public enterprises where the state owns more than 50 percent or holds a majority of appointments on the board of directors. The law has a list of five exceptions for nondisclosure. Responses to any requests for information must be delivered within 20 business days, and there is no cost for the request. In cases of noncompliance, the head of the organization is subject to a fine between 20 percent and 50 percent of his or her monthly salary. The autonomous Transparency Council provides for the right of access to information and issues rulings on cases in which information is denied.

== Investigation of alleged violations of human rights ==
A number of domestic and international human rights groups generally operated without government restriction, investigating and publishing their findings on human rights cases. Government officials were generally cooperative and responsive to their views, although some indigenous rights groups claimed their views were disregarded.

Government Human Rights Bodies: The INDH, an autonomous government entity, operated independently, issued public statements, and proposed changes to government agencies or policies to promote and protect human rights. INDH's 2013 annual report noted concern over several human rights problems, including access to justice; excessive police force; violence against women and children; societal abuses against youth, immigrants, transgender persons, and other minorities; and the continued application of the antiterrorism law, including in cases involving members of indigenous communities. The Senate and Chamber of Deputies also have standing human rights committees responsible for drafting human rights legislation.

== Discrimination, societal abuses, and trafficking in persons ==
The constitution states the all persons are born free and are equal in terms of the law and dignity; however, it does not specifically identify groups protected from discrimination. The 2012 Anti-Discrimination Law provides civil legal remedies to victims of discrimination based on race, ethnicity, nationality, socioeconomic situation, language, ideology or political opinion, religion or belief, association or participation in union organizations or lack thereof, gender, sexual orientation, gender identification, marriage status, age, affiliation, personal appearance, and sickness or physical disability. The law also increases criminal penalties for acts of violence based on discrimination, but such discrimination continued to occur.

=== Women ===
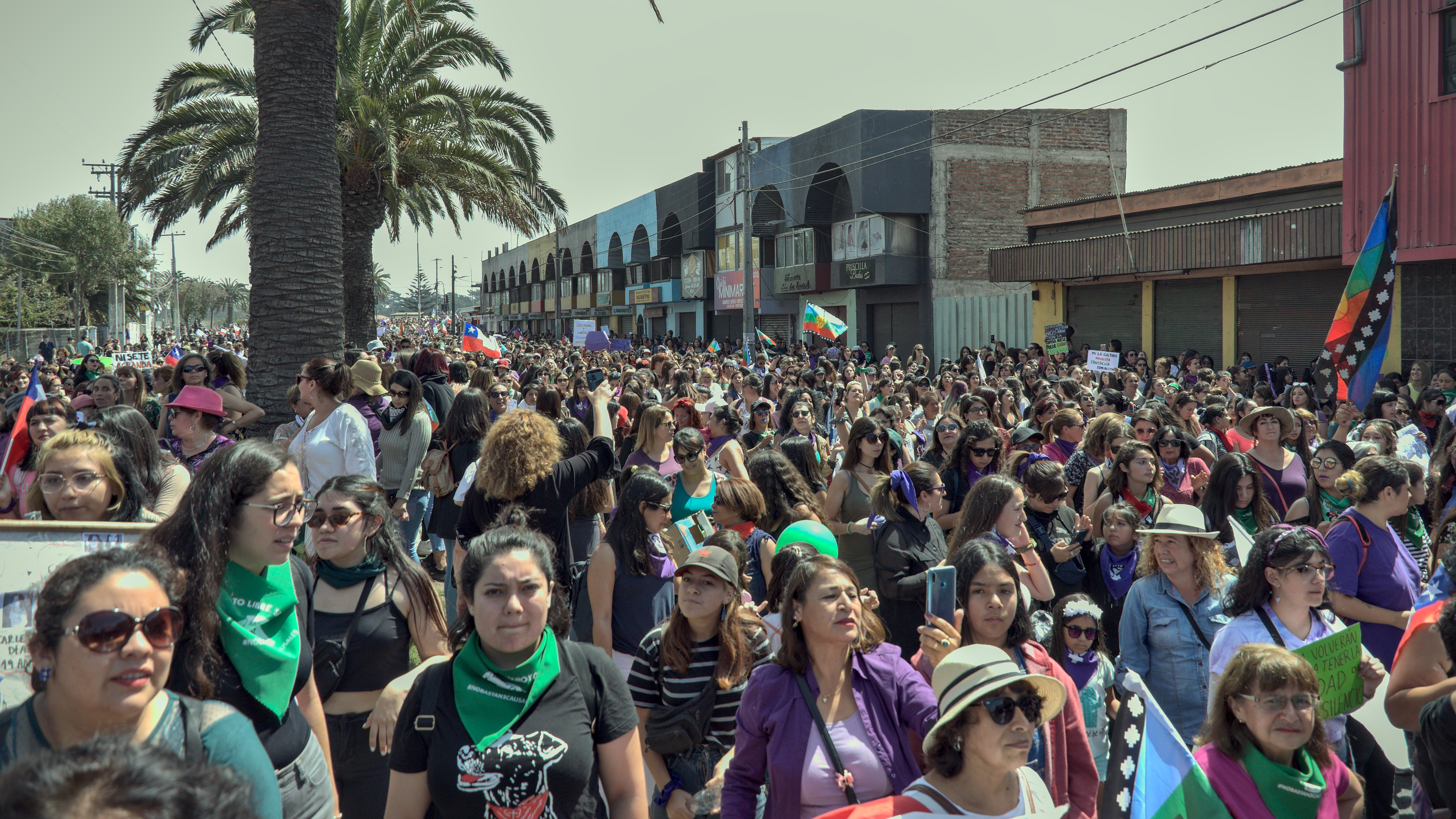
International Women's Day march in San Antonio, Chile

Domestic violence against women is a serious problem. One study reported 74 percent of married women had suffered physical violence. Rape, including spousal rape, is a criminal offense; the government generally enforced the law. Experts believe that most rape cases went unreported. Although adult prostitution is legal, bordellos are not.

Sexual harassment generally was recognized as a problem. A 2005 law against sexual harassment provides protection and financial compensation to victims and penalizes harassment by employers or co-workers. Most complaints are resolved quickly, resulting in action against the harasser in 33 percent of cases.

Women enjoy the same legal rights as men, including rights under family law and property law. The quadrennial 2004 National Socio-Economic Survey suggested that the overall gender income gap remained at 33 percent, and women's workforce participation rose to 42 percent. The labor code provides specific benefits for pregnant workers and recent mothers.

A 2005 study by Corporacion Humana and the University of Chile's Institute of Public Affairs revealed that 87 percent of women surveyed felt that women suffered discrimination.

=== Children ===
The government is committed to children's rights and welfare. Education is universal, compulsory, and free from first through 12th grade. The government provided basic health care through a public system, with equal access for girls and boys. Violence against children was a problem. A 2003 study by the Citizens' Peace Foundation indicated that 60 percent of children surveyed between the ages of seven and 10 had suffered some type of aggression against them or their belongings either inside or outside their homes. Child prostitution was a problem (see Human trafficking in Chile), as was child labor in the informal economy (see Labor rights in Chile).

=== Trafficking in persons ===
The law does not specifically prohibit trafficking in persons, and there were isolated reports that persons were trafficked to, from, and within the country for the purposes of sexual exploitation and involuntary domestic servitude. The law criminalizes promoting the entry into or exit from the country of persons for the purpose of facilitating prostitution, as well as the prostitution of children and corruption of minors.

Most trafficking victims were minors trafficked internally for sexual exploitation. Law enforcement authorities stated that small numbers of victims were trafficked to the neighboring countries of Argentina, Peru, and Bolivia, as well as to the United States, Europe, and Asia. Anecdotal reports suggested that young women were the primary targets for trafficking to other countries. Traffickers looking for children also targeted economically disadvantaged families, convincing the parents that they were giving the child the opportunity for a better life.

The government makes substantial efforts to prevent trafficking and to assist trafficking victims.

=== Persons with disabilities ===
The law prohibits discrimination against persons with physical and mental disabilities, but such persons suffered forms of de facto discrimination. The law mandates access to buildings for persons with disabilities, but a Ministry of Housing and Urban Planning study based on a 2002-03 census showed that 70 percent of the buildings in the country designated as public or multiuse failed to meet that standard. An improved public transportation system in Santiago provided wheelchair access on major "trunk" routes. Some local "feeder" routes also provided low-rise buses with access ramps. Subway lines in the Santiago metropolitan area provided limited access for persons with disabilities. Public transport outside of Santiago was problematic.

In April 2005, the government released its First National Study of Disability, which revealed that twice as many persons with disabilities were in the lower socioeconomic brackets as in the middle and upper brackets. Approximately 100,000 persons with disabilities under the age of 27 did not receive any special care or education.

=== Indigenous people ===
The 2002 census recorded approximately 692,000 self-identified persons of indigenous origin (5 percent of the total population). The law gives indigenous people a voice in decisions affecting their lands, cultures, and traditions and provides for bilingual education in schools with indigenous populations. Approximately one-half the self-identified indigenous population remained separated from the rest of society. Indigenous people also experienced some societal discrimination and reported incidents in which they were attacked and harassed. In 2011, the Inter-American Commission charged the Chilean government with racism for using the country's Anti-Terrorist Law against the Mapuche indigenous people.

=== LGBT rights ===
Since 1998, both male and female same-sex sexual activity have been legal in Chile. Same-sex marriage has been available for homosexual couples as of 2022.

However, police abuse in Chile remains an issue for the LGBT community.

=== Intersex rights ===
In 2015, Chile briefly became the second country to protect intersex infants and children from unnecessary medical interventions, following Malta, however, the regulations were superseded the following year by guidance permitting intersex medical interventions.

== Housing rights ==
Chile has long struggled to find adequate housing for all of its citizens despite decades of commitment to orthodox, market-based policy prescriptions. Historically, marginalized communities lacking legitimate housing have been pushed to organize land seizures in order to secure their place near the opportunity of the city.

After the success of a military coup led by General Augusto Pinochet to unseat the democratically-elected government of socialist President Salvador Allende on September 11, 1973, the Pinochet regime “disproportionately repressed” many of the occupied neighborhoods. Many of the pobladores initially spared would later be forcefully displaced through massive slum removal programs throughout the late 1970s, contributing to overcrowding on the periphery of Chile’s cities where the marginalized communities were forced to live in uniform housing with unacceptably low lot sizes. However, following a severe economic crisis in 1981, many pobladores re-organized for good, as the dictatorship reluctantly employed land titling programs to enable the seized land to be developed legitimately; with this, “[t]he dictatorship ultimately accepted, however grudgingly, the idea that housing was a right.”

Chile’s troubling history with dictatorship and harsh experience with the extremes of neoliberal policymaking does not mean that Chile has not historically developed some Keynesian models to encourage home ownership. As early as 1906, Chile used national legislation to ensure housing access for its growing working class. Later in 1925, Chile passed further legislation aimed at safeguarding access to affordable housing. By mid-century, Chile had used its functioning liberal democracy to develop a broad public housing program under the tutelage of a national Housing Corporation (known by its Spanish-language acronym, “CORVI”). These programs enabled many Chileans to leave the transitory nature of informal housing behind, finding a defined living space to focus instead on improving their daily lives.

Since the end of dictatorship and a return to Chile’s traditional democratic order, “the government’s subsidies for housing have helped to spur a massive building boom in low-income areas, especially in Santiago.” Over many years, the Progressive Housing Programme (1994-2016) allowed for coordination of a wider government effort to address the housing gap, which incorporated incremental housing solutions. Despite this, seizures have persisted to some extent, as inequalities produced during the dictatorship continue to cast long shadows in modern Chile. Today, despite the hard-fought right to housing once earned by pobladores, many Chileans still live precariously in informal housing while facing “a flexible and insecure labor market, in which they tend to carry heavy debt burdens.

== Labor rights ==
Workers have the right to form and join trade unions without prior authorization, and approximately 10 percent of the total work force is unionized. The law allows unions to conduct their activities without interference, and the government protects this right in practice. While employees in the private sector have the right to strike, the government regulates this right, and there are some restrictions. The law prohibits forced or compulsory labor, and there have been no reports that such practices occurred. The law restricts child labor, but it is a problem in the informal economy. There are reports that children are trafficked. The minimum wage is set by law and is subject to adjustment annually. The law sets the legal workweek at six days or 45 hours; the maximum workday length is 10 hours. The law establishes occupational safety and health standards.

== Human rights organizations ==
The first human rights organization operating in Chile was the Committee of Cooperation for Peace in Chile formed by an interreligious group in 1973 in response to the torture, killings, and other violations of human rights following the 1973 Chilean coup d'etat. When the Pinochet regime forced its dissolution in November 1975, it was followed a few months later with the establishment of the Vicariate of Solidarity by the Roman Catholic Archdiocese of Santiago. The Lutherans established a similar organization, the Foundation for Social Assistance of the Christian Churches (FASIC). Next to appear in 1974, were the Association of Families of the Detained-Disappeared, and Families of the Executed for Political Reasons; the Chilean Human Rights Commission appeared in 1978, the Commission for the Rights of the People in 1980, the National Commission Against Torture in 1982, and others.

== See also ==
- Human Rights Archive of Chile
