= Arpilleras =

Embroidered patchwork picture

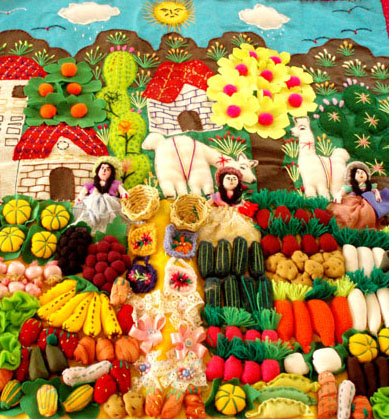
A 3D arpillera

An arpillera, which means burlap in Spanish, is a brightly colored patchwork picture made predominantly by groups of women (also known as arpilleristas). The construction of arpilleras became popular in Chile during the military dictatorship (1973–90) of Augusto Pinochet. Arpilleras were made in workshops organized by a committee of the Chilean Catholic Church and then secretly distributed abroad through the church's human rights group, the Vicariate of Solidarity. The production of arpilleras provided a vital source of income for the arpilleristas, many of whom had been left in a state of financial insecurity due to widespread unemployment and forced disappearances of their husbands and children, who became known as desaparecidos.

Arpilleras are typically constructed from simple materials such as burlap and scraps of cloth. Arpilleras usually depicted expressly political themes through the demonstration scenes of impoverished living conditions and government repression. These scenes served to denounce the human rights violations of the Pinochet regime. In response, the Chilean government sought to punish those who created arpilleras and those who supported the creation of arpilleras. Arpilleras are currently recognized as an example of subversive women's art in an authoritarian political context. However, contemporary arpilleras reflect less political themes, such as idealized rural life.

== Historical background ==
=== Pinochet regime ===
In September 1973, following months of political tensions and social unrest in Chile, the democratically elected socialist government of Salvador Allende was overthrown in a US-backed coup d'etat. The coup d'etat was carried out by the Chilean military forces under Augusto Pinochet in response to Allende's leftist reforms and the perceived threat of communism. From its first days in power, the Pinochet regime was characterized by widespread human rights violations. In the period immediately following the coup, the junta declared a state of emergency and engaged in arbitrary arrests and abolished all political parties and unions, with tens of thousands of people facing torture, interrogation, and execution in the following years. There is some debate about exactly how many people were killed or "disappeared" into the regime's prisons, torture chambers and unmarked graves for suspected political reasons over Pinochet's 16 years in power. In 1991 the National Commission for Truth and Reconciliation Report found that the Pinochet Regime killed over 2000 people, and the 2005 Valech Report which focused on detentions reported that 38,254 people had been imprisoned for political reasons and that most of those detained had been tortured.

Additionally, the rapid shift from Allende's socialist policies to Pinochet's neoliberal reforms entailed a "shock treatment" on the Chilean economy, which saw a rapid decline in social spending and substantial layoffs in the civil service, resulting in an 18.7 percent unemployment rate by 1975. As a result, Chileans became further impoverished and suffered from food shortages. Additionally, Chileans with little or no income could not pay for utilities previously granted by the government, such as water and electricity. These utilities were transformed by the government into sources of profit to fund the military. In regards to the Pinochet regime's treatment of Chilean women, restrictive doctrines more oppressively promoted the Pinochet regime's perspective that women should maintain silent and politically inactive roles as wives and mothers.

==== Impact on women ====
Especially affected by the implementation of neoliberal policies were women from poor and working-class households. Many of these women were left without a source of income due to widespread unemployment and political disappearances. Therefore, these women were forced to seek work outside the home for the first time. Additionally, Pinochet's ascent to power affected opportunities for women's organization and visibility in politics, both among supporters and opponents of the regime. Upper-class women, especially those with ties to the military, were upheld by the government as examples of moral virtue and were incorporated into efforts to praise female domesticity and the patriarchal family model through participation in pro-government organizations such as the Centros de Madres and the Secretaría Nacional de Mujeres. Conversely, numerous groups with substantial women's participation emerged both out of opposition to the Pinochet government's repressive tactics and the need for economic subsistence. These groups included explicitly political groups that advocated for human rights and justice for the desaparecidos, mutual aid organizations that provided meals and taught practical skills, and communal workshops organized by the Catholic Church designed to provide employment opportunities.

== Origins of the arpillera workshops ==
=== Isla Negra ===
Before arpillera workshops became more popular during Pinochet's regime, the philanthropist Sra. Leonora Soberino de Vera created a workshop in the rural area of Isla Negra. The women who worked in this workshop struggled with issues of poverty, unemployment, and alcoholism. The arpilleras in this workshop, which were inspired by folklore and arpilleristas' memories, portrayed themes on the joys of life and the desire to live a pastoral life. The women gained customers from a global market through the support of the government and museums. However, a great increase in demand for these arpilleras, which occurred through the support of Pablo Neruda and Violetta Parra, burdened the women as well. Regardless, through the continued support of Sra. Leonora, the women continued to gather at the workshops to create arpilleras.

=== Santiago ===
Shortly after the 1973 coup d'etat, various Catholic Church groups, inspired by liberation theology, began to organize in opposition to the military regime. One such group, which also helped develop the first arpillera workshops in Santiago, was the Committee of Cooperation for Peace in Chile (Spanish: Comité de Cooperación para la Paz). When the first arpillera workshops were developed in Santiago, the arpilleristas in these workshops gained inspiration from the work developed in the Isla Negra workshops. However, the Isla Negra women's wool embroidery methods were viewed as too expensive and time-consuming, so the Santiago women developed their own methods. Regardless, in 1975, this church was forced to dissolve.

The Vicariate of Solidarity was set up under the auspices of the Chilean Catholic Church, and took up the struggle for human rights in Chile where the Committee of Cooperation left off. It was a vocal opponent of the military regime and a voice for human rights, and worked to provide assistance to Chilean citizens in the form of legal aid, health care, food, and employment. In March 1974, under the leadership of Valentina Bonne, a church official, the first arpillera workshops held by the Vicariate of Solidarity were established to provide unemployed women with a modest income, create a community for emotional support, and draw international attention to the repressive political situation through the sale of denunciatory artwork. The Vicariate also provided supplies for women to craft arpilleras. Women would meet in discreet locations such as church basements in order to evade government detection. Although arpilleras were mainly crafted in workshops, there are some instances where arpilleras were made from prison as well. An estimated 14 women, many of whom hailed from the shantytowns of Santiago, participated in the initial workshops. There were ten workshops in Santiago by 1975. At the height of the arpillera movement, approximately 200 workshops were held in Santiago, each with roughly 20 participants and three meetings per week.

At these workshops, women would gather together and stitch arpilleras in exchange for funds. Also, when the arpilleristas gathered, they would talk about the use of proper skill, design, and themes for arpilleras to ensure proper management of the quality and quantity of arpilleras produced. At the end of each gathering, a treasurer would collect the arpilleras for sale overseas to human rights organizations, NGOs, and groups of Chilean exiles. Usually, unless an arpillerista was undergoing dire economic struggle, she was only allowed to make and offer one arpillera per week. In cases of urgent economic need, women were allowed to make and offer two arpilleras per week. If a committee of six arpilleristas from the workshop determined that any of the group's arpilleras met quality requirements, the approved arpilleras were collected and sold once a month for $15 each after being brought to the Vicariate. During the dictatorship, arpilleras gained international attention through their distribution by the Catholic Church and organizations such as Amnesty International and Oxfam UK. The primary purchasers of arpilleras were North American and European human-rights activists who wished to express their solidarity with victims of the regime, as well as Chilean exiles living abroad who hoped to raise international opposition to poverty and political repression in Chile. After receiving compensation for her arpilleras, each woman would contribute 10% of her payment to a collective fund to ensure the workshop's survival.

== Form and thematic content ==
=== Form ===
Rules on the amount of figures permitted in an arpillera and the required sizes, composition, proportion, colors, and themes were decided by the committee and afterward by the Vicariate.

Arpilleras were intended to be formally simple and accessible to everyday women with no artistic training. Given the scant resources of the Vicariate of Solidarity and the individual workshop participants, arpilleras were made from the cheapest available materials. Materials used to make arpilleras included flour sacks or wheat sacks typically made of jute, flax, or hemp fibers, scraps of cloth, used thread, and discarded objects. Most arpilleras were constructed from thick hessian canvasses, with colorful pieces of fabric stitched and embroidered together in appliqué style to form flat images of people, buildings, city streets, and landscapes.

Many also included three-dimensional elements, such as small dolls stitched atop the fabric. These dolls are meant to represent the unique qualities of the individuals they are inspired by. Arpilleristas also included more three-dimensional elements by using pieces of tin to serve as pots and pans, matchsticks and broom handles, and parts of plastic pill casings as bowls.

Also, arpilleristas sometimes chose to elaborate on the meaning of their arpillera by placing a paper written description into a small pocket sewn onto the back of the arpillera. Generally, these descriptions expressed desires for solidarity and detailed the infringement of human rights in Chlie. The paper sometimes also included the arpillerista's name, but arpilleristas usually did not write their names to remain safe.

There are currently three different types of styles used to create an arpillera:

1. The Flat of Planar Method: Embroidery stitches from the surrounding area of the arpillera are used to fasten fabric materials to the surface.
2. The Raised or Relief Method: Dolls and objects in the arpillera are slightly lifted from the surface through embroidery stitches.
3. The Glue Method: Contrasting wool that has been glued is used to border the fabric materials that have been glued to the surface.

When an arpillera is finished, it is framed by a wool crocheted border and varies in size from 9" x 12" to 12" x 18" inches.

=== Thematic content ===
Although arpilleras sometimes depicted scenes of joyful memories, they mostly demonstrated scenes of oppression. Because workshop attendants encouraged discussion about political repression and economic injustice, and at times explicitly stated their goal of generating sufficient international outrage to necessitate a return to democratic rule, the arpilleristas often depicted expressly political themes that may have been chosen by the group. Sometimes, murals were formed by sewing arpilleras together with common themes. Arpilleras were often characterized by the tension between the vibrant, colorful imagery created by the woven pieces of fabric and their serious imagery and somber political messages. For example, colorful scraps of material were usually cut into triangular pieces and placed along the horizon of an arpillera to represent the wealth and beauty of Chile through various regions and seasons. However, somber messages of injustice in living conditions, lifestyle, or economic opportunities and messages depicting a change in a situation were portrayed through a separating figure, such as a building, street, river, or fence.

Therefore, in addition to everyday scenes of Santiago's shantytowns and the Andean landscape, the arpilleras often referenced human rights violations and state violence, poverty, and the lack of women's political rights. For example, some arpilleras portrayed bones, body bags, and individuals being interrogated by the military police. Also, some arpilleras would depict scenes of village children eating from large soup pots in communal kitchens or individuals attempting to obtain food by waiting in a line. Other arpilleras also showed women outside the prisons where their friends and family were imprisoned and depict these women chaining themselves to the prison fence.

Arpilleras also commonly bore the faces of the arpilleristas' disappeared family members. Marjorie Agosín, a Chilean-American writer and arpilleras scholar, has compared the visual language with which the arpilleristas demanded justice for the desaparecidos with that of the Mothers of the Plaza de Mayo in Argentina, who wore photographs of their disappeared children during the Dirty War. Many arpilleras also included text stitched into the fabric, with short political messages that demanded to know the fate of the desaparecidos and decried the lack of women's political and economic rights.

Sociologist Jacqueline Adams has noted that in the early 1980s, the Catholic Church grew less vocally critical of the Pinochet regime and dismissed the Vicariate's more radical staff members, which she contends led to a shift in the content of the arpilleras. She argues that the arpilleristas grew less denunciatory in their work and shifted focus from political themes to tranquil images of everyday life, knowing that the Vicariate would reject any work deemed too subversive. Regardless, the images in these arpilleras, such as of individuals diverting power lines to obtain electricity and individuals obtaining water from a pump, still demonstrate the effects of political and economic oppression.

== Impact ==
=== Women ===
While an estimated 80 percent of the arpilleristas came from poor or working-class households, the remaining 20 percent came from upper-middle-class households. The upper-middle-class women were primarily motivated by the disappearances of family members and the desire to show solidarity with the victims of political violence. While some of the participants arrived at the workshops with preexisting political inclinations, a number having been supporters of Salvador Allende, the majority had been previously uninvolved in politics and subsequently developed leftist and pro-democracy leanings through the political atmosphere fostered by the workshops and conversation about the shared experience of having lost family members to the regime. As women continued to engage in conversations about the regime, they learned more about the systems of power that control Chile. As a result, women would learn more about their rights by going to lectures and would then protest through hunger strikes, marches, and other means.

Regarding domestic matters, the funds that women earned from selling arpilleras allowed women to increase their families' educational opportunities, health, and well-being. However, the work women performed in arpillera workshops contradicted the societal notion that women were only supposed to be involved in domestic affairs. As a result, women suffered verbal and physical abuse from their husbands. However, there were some cases where arpillera crafting was performed by women's children and husbands to allow women more leisure time.

=== Government response ===
The Pinochet government maintained widespread censorship policies over artistic expression. During the early days of the workshops, Chilean police forces confiscated numerous arpilleras, while members of the military denounced them as defamatory 'tapestries of infamy' after discovering a parcel of arpilleras en route to Europe at Santiago's airport.

Due to the threat of censorship and government repression, most arpilleras were made anonymously, representing a collective voice of female suffering. Women sought to prevent themselves from being caught by the military police by crafting arpilleras under candlelight behind thickly draped windows. Also, in case the police ever searched their homes, women attempted to avoid arrest or punishment by hiding arpilleras in the lining of their bedspreads. Additionally, when women brought their arpilleras to the Vicariate, they sought to avoid being caught by hiding the arpilleras in their coats and skirts.

Arpilleras faced censorship for the portrayal of subversive themes and were thus rarely sold locally or displayed in domestic galleries. They were eventually outlawed entirely, though the workshops continued through the end of Pinochet's rule.

Eventually, the government decided to manufacture its own arpilleras because the current arpillera workshops would not cease production and international demand was difficult to meet for current arpilleristas. Scenes of the Chilean flag, historical sites, and nature were all crafted into government-sponsored arpilleras by individual artists. The government claimed these arpilleras were "official" and also used these arpilleras to create posters.

=== Legacy ===
Since the transition to democracy, arpilleras have been shown internationally in the United States and throughout Europe. Capital cities around the world, such as Washington D.C., and Chilean government-sponsored curio shops also currently possess arpilleras manufactured by Pinochet's regime. The arpillera movement has been lauded for its visual representation of life under the Pinochet regime and its subversive treatment of human rights and gender issues, having been displayed in the Victoria and Albert Museum's 2014 Disobedient Objects exhibit. Also, about 500 arpilleras were repatriated to Chile to create an exhibit in The Museum of Memory and Human Rights. Chilean novelist Isabel Allende has remarked of the arpilleras, "With leftovers of fabric and simple stitches, the women embroidered what could not be told in words, and thus the arpilleras became powerful forms of political resistance... the arpilleras flourished in the midst of a silent nation, and from the inner patios of churches and poor neighborhoods, stories made of cloth and yarn narrated what was forbidden."

While the formal workshops ceased in 1989 with the reestablishment of Chilean democracy, the tradition continued through the work of independent arpilleristas. Modern arpilleras mostly depict an idealized version of Chilean rural life. These modern arpilleras are also produced by machines and sold as wall hangings, cards, coin purses, table runners, bibs, and other types of souvenirs in street markets and tourist shops like the Chile Crafts Foundation (Fundación Artesanía de Chile). The foundation established stores in downtown Santiago and the airport to expose tourists to Chilean culture and to provide arpilleristas with the opportunity to sell their work for income. Nonetheless, modern arpilleras have also received criticism because they are believed to depict a generic portrayal of Chile and disregard the political history of arpilleras. However, arpilleras in Chile in 2011 did express political themes that condemned the treatment of the indigenous Mapuche people by the Chilean government. Arpilleras have also inspired stylistically and thematically similar works of art in other countries that have faced state violence, such as Colombia, Peru, Zimbabwe, and Northern Ireland.

== See also ==
- Violence against women
