= Guillo =

Chilean satirist (born 1950)

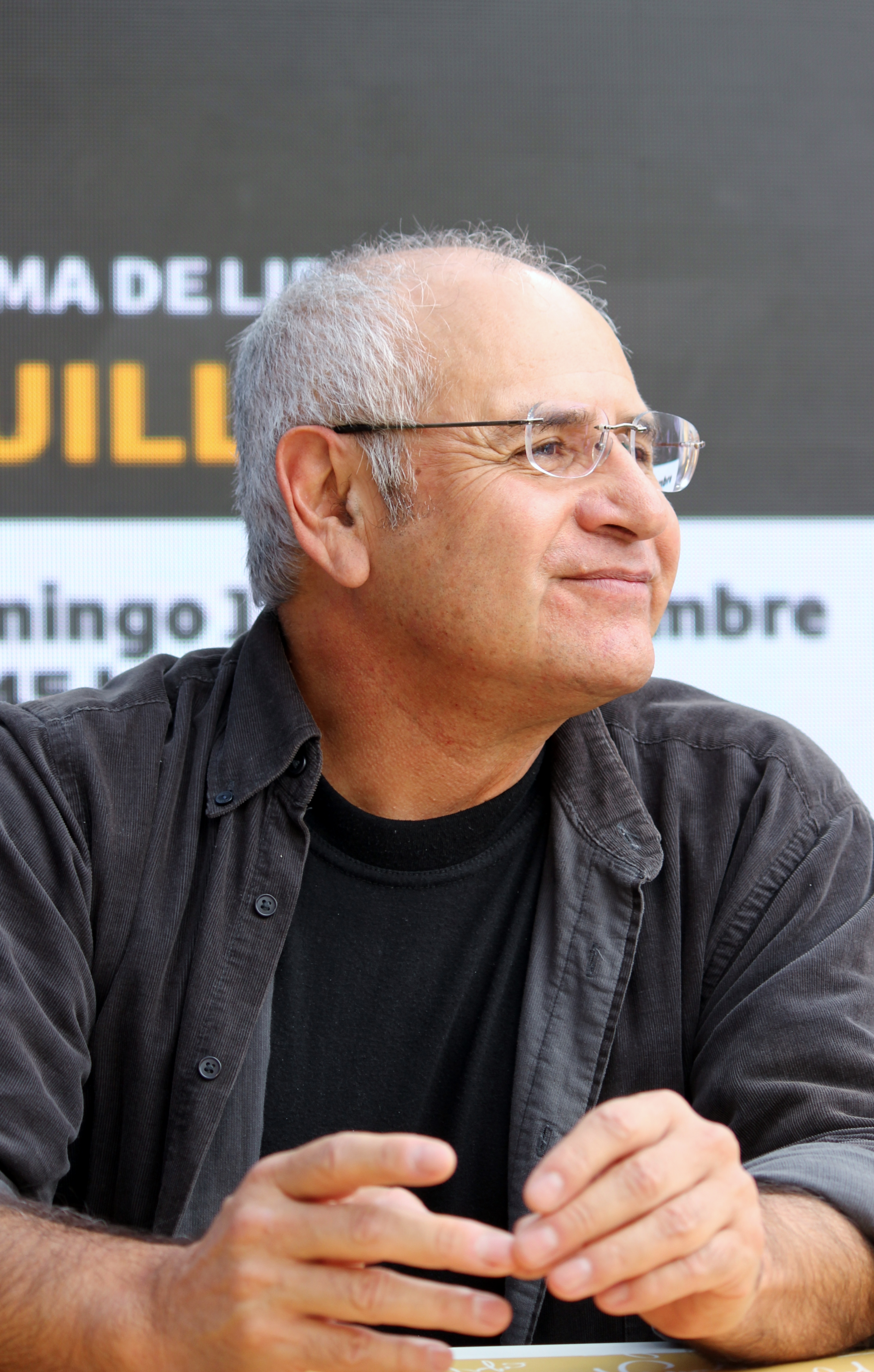
Guillo

Guillo is the pen name of the graphical satirist Guillermo Bastías. He published drawings in APSI in the 1980s. On one occasion a picture of dictator Pinochet posing as Louis XIV led the whole staff of APSI to be imprisoned and the newspapeter to be censored out of the newsagent's shop and its staff imprisoned.

In 1992 he won Premio 500 años by Sociedad Nacional de Caricatura and in 2009 he won the Premio Apes.
