= Sola Sierra =

Chilean human rights activist (1935–1999)

Sola Sierra Henríquez
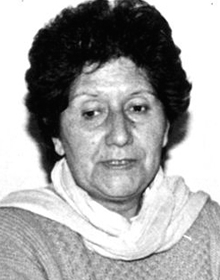
- Born: 1 December 1935; San Miguel, Chile
- Died: 1 July 1999 (aged 63)
- Occupation: Human Rights Activist

Sola Sierra Henríquez (1 December 1935 – 1 July 1999) was a Chilean human rights activist. She was director of Relatives of the Detained-Disappeared organization, and campaigned to find out the truth about the people who were violently disappeared during Augusto Pinochet's dictatorship.

== Life and career ==
Sierra was born in San Miguel, a residential neighborhood in Santiago, on 1 December 1935.

She joined the Chilean Communist Party when she was young and focused on promoting health for the poor.

When Augusto Pinochet overthrew the Chilean government in 1973 and assumed power, Sierra and her husband, Waldo Pizarro, a fellow communist, stayed in the country. After her husband and a friend disappeared after they were arrested by the police on 15 December 1976, she became the president of a campaign group called Relatives of the Detained-Disappeared. The group campaigned to find out the truth about what happened to hundreds of people who disappeared during Pinochet's reign and bring the people responsible to justice. Despite the danger, they campaigned throughout his reign until he lost power. Even after a new government came to power, Sierra and other people with missing relatives were not told the truth and due to an amnesty agreement, those responsible were protected from punishment and so continued to campaign.

After Pinochet was arrested in October 1998 Sierra traveled to London to help a Spanish prosecutor campaign for his extradition.

She died on 1 July 1999 of a heart attack while recovering from back surgery.
