= Alejandra Matus =

Chilean journalist, writer, and communist activist (born 1966)

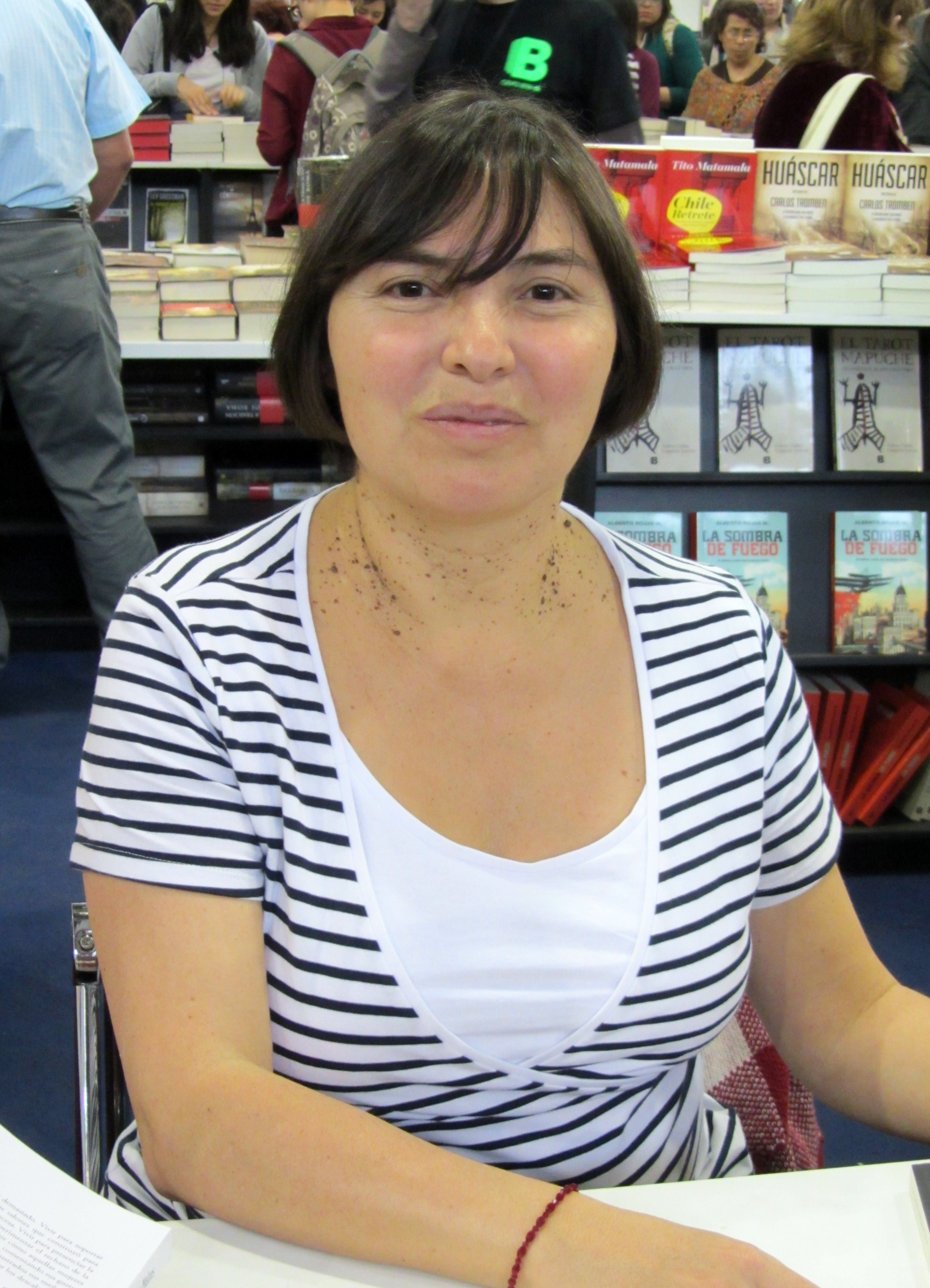
- Matus signing books at Santiago International Book Fair in 2015
- Born: January 11, 1966 (age 60); San Antonio, Chile
- Education: Pontifical Catholic University of Chile; Harvard Kennedy School
- Occupations: journalist, writer
- Awards: Ortega y Gasset (1996); Vasyl Stus (2000); Hellman/Hammett (2000)

Alejandra Matus Acuña (San Antonio, January 11, 1966) is a Chilean journalist and writer recognized for her disclosure of human rights abuses that occurred during the dictatorship of Augusto Pinochet.

While working at the defunct Chilean newspaper La Época, she covered news on the judicial branch of Chile. This work inspired the investigation that she would later publish in El libro negro de la justicia chilena. The available copies of the book were confiscated one day before the planned release and Matus was accused of contempt by Servando Jordán, minister of the Supreme Court of Chile, in violation of State Security law. This prompted Matus to seek political asylum in the United States. The case led to the desacato article to be removed from the law with the new Ley de Prensa (Press Law) that was signed on May 25, 2001, which allowed Matus to return to Chile. Despite the new law the book continued to be banned until October 2001 when the Corte de Apelaciones (Appellate Court) removed the ban.

In 2013 she published the book Doña Lucía, a biography about Lucía Hiriart.

== El libro negro de la justicia chilena ==
During her journalistic work in the judicial field, she gathered information for a book chronicling the branch's performance. The book included information such as the behavior of judges during the dictatorship of Augusto Pinochet and the crimes that some committed for being members of the Supreme Court, which put them in a position of abuse of power in certain circumstances. The publishing house that would distribute the book took the risk in publishing the work. One day before its launch, Minister Servando Jordán requested to confiscate all copies, accusing the author of violating the State Security Law.

Faced with this conflict, the journalist was politically asylumed in the United States. Meanwhile, legal actions were carried out that would end with the drafting of a law that would protect journalists and their sources.

In 2016, Matus re-released the book in a new, corrected, and expanded version.
