= Ciper =

Chilean nonprofit news organisation

- Founded: 2007
- Type: Nonprofit
- Purpose: Investigative journalism
- Location: Santiago, Chile
- Key people: Mónica González, John Dinges
- Website: ciperchile.cl

Ciper also known as CIPER Chile is a Chilean alternative media of digital journalism. Ciper is the Spanish acronym for "Journalistic Investigation Center" (Centro de Investigación Periodística). It is a nonprofit organization.
