= Documentation and Archive Foundation of the Vicariate of Solidarity =

The Documentation and Archive Foundation of the Vicariate of Solidarity (Fundación de Documentación y Archivo de la Vicaría de la Solidaridad) is a non-governmental organization whose main goal is to preserve and manage the documents, publications, images, and media clippings collected by the former and by the organization that replaced it, the Vicariate of Solidarity. These files are considered part of the history and heritage both of Chile and the Church of Santiago. They are available to the public as instruments of reconciliation and cooperation, with the aim of building a society based on truth, justice and the respect for human rights. The organization also collaborates with the judiciary and the information contained in its files has been used to prosecute crimes against human rights in Chile's recent history.

== History ==
In October 1973, Cardinal Raúl Silva Henríquez, along with representatives from other churches, created the (Comité Pro Paz), an organization that provides legal and social help to the victims of Chile's military dictatorship and their families. The Committee for Peace was replaced on January 1 of 1976 by the Vicariate of Solidarity, which has continued the work started by the Comité Pro Paz. It worked throughout the military dictatorship and finally closed on December 31, 1992. The 20-year project documenting the cases of victims contain valuable information and represents the biggest sources of information about human rights in Chile. When the Vicariate of Solidarity closed, it in turn was replaced by the, which was founded on January 1, 1993. It was created to preserve the documents and information collected by the Vicariate of Solidarity and the Committee for Peace about human rights violations committed between September 1973 and March 1990.

== Files and archive ==
One of the Foundation's goals is to collaborate in the reconciliation and creation of a society based on truth, justice and respect for human rights. In line with this, it created a national archive that brings together the biggest collection of evidence (documents, pictures, forensic reports, testimonies and physical samples) from the military regime. The files were all collected during the period when the human rights violations were taking place and the organizations that collected them are highly regarded both in Chile and abroad, which makes them a highly valued source of evidence for governmental, judiciary, parliamentary and NGO organisations among others. The files have being organized and classified according to their type and use:

- 1.- Legal Information Centre

Contains 45,000 legal files, each representing one person attended by the Vicariate of Solidarity or its predecessor. These documents are generally copies but in many cases they are unique originals and include habeas corpus files, extradition processes, investigations into torture, kidnap, murder and forced disappearances. It also includes complaints to international organizations. In total, there are more than 85.000 documents.

- 2.- Microfilm Centre

Contains microfilm of confidential documents or documents from the Legal Information Centre that are more difficult to copy.

- 3.- Digital File

Contains information about repressive action that occurred after 1984 and the legal action taken in these cases. There is also information about human rights violations that ended in death or disappearing of the victim. It covers the period from 1973 to 1990.

- 4.- Public Document Centre

A library containing: 4,200 human rights titles; 4,000 human rights documents edited by the Vicariate itself and other Chilean and international organizations; 84 journal titles (59 Chilean and 25 foreign); 687,000 clippings from the Chilean media from 1973 to the present, classified by topic; and a photo and video archive holding more than 200 documentaries and films about human rights.

== Semi-annual report ==
In order to share information and report on human rights violations, the "Documentation and Archive Foundation of the Vicariate of Solidarity collects and publishes the most relevant figures every half year. These reports are available to the public and can be consulted by Chileans or by foreign persons or organizations related to the cause of the human rights.

== See also ==
- Vicariate of Solidarity
- Chile under Pinochet
- Human rights violations during the Military government of Chile
- Rettig Report
- Valech Report
- History of Chile
