= APSI =

- Director: Arturo Navarro (1976–1978)
- Categories: News magazine
- Frequency: Weekly
- First issue: June 1976
- Final issue: 1995
- Country: Chile
- Based in: Santiago
- Language: Spanish
- ISSN: 0716-1212

APSI (an abbreviation of "Agencia Publicitaria de Servicios Informativos") was a Chilean magazine aimed as means of political opposition to the Pinochet dictatorship. It was headquartered in Santiago.

== History ==
One of the tactics of the dictatorship was to isolate the public from international news and outside influences in order to maintain its stranglehold on information. Following the 1975 shutdown of the human rights organization Comité Pro Paz in response to a political offensive by the Pinochet regime, Precht, then Vicar, allowed the ex-employees to issue grant requests to European commissions. One of the European applications was a project to create a news agency about international news. This request by Arturo Navarro, an ex-Comité employee, resulted in a grant of seven thousand dollars, and APSI was born.

APSI was published on a weekly basis. Due to the climate of censorship in Chile the magazine focused initially on international news. APSI was published with support of the Popular Unitary Action Movement until late 1978. In 1979 the magazine began reporting on local issues including the numerous human rights violations of the dictatorship.

== See also ==
- Book burnings in Chile
- Guillo
- Human rights violations in Pinochet's Chile
