= Viviana Díaz =

Chilean activist (born 1950)

Viviana Elisa Díaz Caro
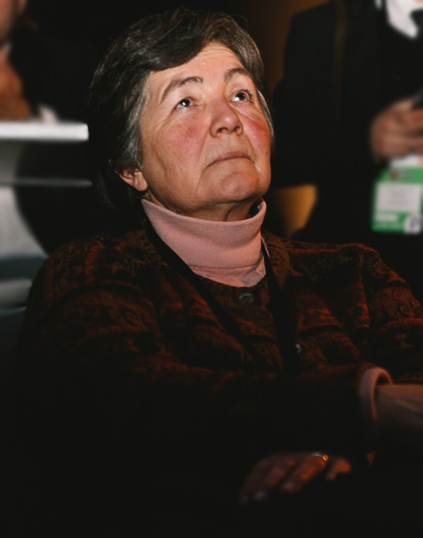
- Born: October 26, 1950 (age 75); Chile
- Occupation: Human rights campaigner
- Known for: President of the Agrupación de Familiars de Detenidos Desaparecidos (Association of the Relatives of the Disappeared)
- Parent: Victor Diaz (father)

Viviana Elisa Díaz Caro (born October 26, 1950) is a Chilean human rights campaigner who became widely known in the struggle for human rights in Chile as the president of the Agrupación de Familiars de Detenidos Desaparecidos (Association of the Relatives of the Disappeared). She is the daughter of Víctor Días sub-secretary of the Communist Party of Chile who disappeared after he was arrested by security forces in 1976.

Díaz was one of the most prominent campaigners to support the arrest of Pinochet in London in 1998 and was opposed to Pinochet's return claiming that in Chile he would never face justice. Whilst Pinochet was under house arrest in London she was subjected to threats and intimidation by right-wing organisations and a death threat by the ultra-right-wing extremist group Frente Nacionalista Patria y Libertad.

On January 7, 2001 President Ricardo Lagos made public information released by the Chilean Armed Forces which detailed the fate of 180 people from the list of the disappeared. Díaz's father, Víctor Días, appeared listed among those who were killed and had their bodily remains thrown into the Pacific Ocean.

In 2006 Díaz expressed public support for what the Michelle Bachelet government had achieved in the area of human rights in Chile. She principally noted that Bachelet had been willing to listen to their demands and meet with the AFDD personally; something no previous concertación government had done. However, Díaz noted that there was much work to be done, including the annulment of the Amnesty Law (initiated and enacted by Pinochet to prevent prosecutions against members of his regime), adherence to the International Criminal Court and the creation of the National Institute of Human Rights.
