= Raúl Silva Henríquez =

Chilean Roman Catholic prelate (1907–1999)

His Eminence Raúl Silva Henríquez S.D.B.
- Cardinal; Archbishop Emeritus of Santiago de Chile
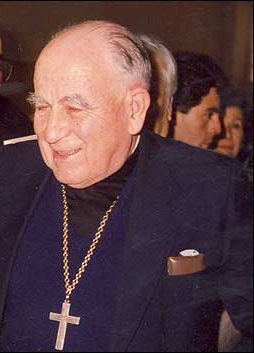
- Church: Roman Catholic Church
- Archdiocese: Santiago de Chile
- See: Santiago de Chile
- Appointed: 14 May 1961
- Installed: 24 June 1961
- Term ended: 3 May 1983
- Predecessor: José María Caro Rodríguez
- Successor: Juan Francisco Fresno Larraín
- Other post: Cardinal-Priest of San Bernardo alle Terme (1962–99)
- Previous post: Bishop of Valparaíso (1959–61)

Orders
- Ordination: 3 July 1938 by Maurilio Fossati
- Consecration: 29 November 1959 by Opilio Rossi
- Created cardinal: 19 March 1962 by Pope John XXIII
- Rank: Cardinal-Priest

Personal details
- Born: Raúl Silva Henríquez; 27 September 1907 Talca, Chile
- Died: 9 April 1999 (aged 91) La Florida, Santiago, Chile
- Buried: Santiago de Chile, Chile
- Denomination: Catholic (Roman Rite)
- Education: Salesian Pontifical University; Pontifical Catholic University of Chile
- Motto: Caritas Christi urget nos
- Coat of arms

Raúl Silva Henríquez SDB (27 September 1907 – 9 April 1999) was a Chilean prelate of the Catholic Church, a cardinal from 1962. He served as Archbishop of Santiago de Chile from 1961 to 1983 and as Bishop of Valparaíso from 1959 to 1961. Both as Archbishop and in retirement, he was an advocate for social justice and democracy and a forthright vocal critic of the military dictatorship of Augusto Pinochet—"a constant thorn in the Government's side".

== Biography ==
Born in Talca, Silva Henríquez was the sixteenth of nineteen children. His father, Ricardo Silva Silva, was a farmer and industrialist of Portuguese descent, and his mother was Mercedes Henríquez Encina. After studying at the Catholic University of Chile where he obtained his doctorate in law, Silva joined the Salesians of Don Bosco on 28 January 1930. He studied at the Salesian Pontifical University in Turin and earned a doctorate in theology and in canon law. He was ordained to the priesthood in Turin on 3 July 1938.

He taught in Chile from 1939 to 1945 and then became director of the Salesian College La Cisterna. From 1951 to 1959 he headed Caritas Chile while also serving as director as Salesian theological studies.

On 24 October 1959, Pope John XXIII named Silva Bishop of Valparaíso. He received his episcopal consecration on 29 November from Archbishop Opilio Rossi, with Archbishop Emilio Tagle Covarrubias and Bishop Vladimiro Boric Crnosija SDB, as co-consecrators. He was named Archbishop of Santiago on 14 May 1961.

Pope John made him Cardinal-Priest of S. Bernardo alle Terme at the consistory of 19 March 1962. He was on good terms with industry leaders and government officials, including both future dictator Augusto Pinochet and the incoming President Salvador Allende, whose Marxist views he opposed but did not find alarming because Allende, he said, "was always prepared to talk". He once said: "There are more of the Gospel's values in socialism than there are in capitalism."

In Santiago he quickly established his reputation as an advocate of far-reaching and immediate social reform. He distributed land on large estates owned by the Church to the peasants who worked on them, saying, "These lands have served God for a long time, but I believe that the needs of the workers on these lands are greater."

After the first meeting between Church and Freemasonry which had been held on 11 April 1969 at the convent of the Divine Master in Ariccia, he was the protagonist of a series of public handshakes between high prelates of the Roman Catholic Church and the heads of Freemasonry.

When Fidel Castro visited Chile in 1972, Silva gave him 10,000 Bibles to distribute in Cuba.

Silva attended the Second Vatican Council from 1962 to 1965. In October 1964, he joined the prelates who signed a petition asking Pope Paul VI to support the council's drafts of declarations on the Church's attitude toward the Jews and on religious liberty and to resist conservative attempts to weaken them.

He was one of the cardinal electors in the 1963 papal conclave, which elected Pope Paul VI. He participated in the conclaves of August and October 1978, which elected Popes John Paul I and John Paul II respectively.

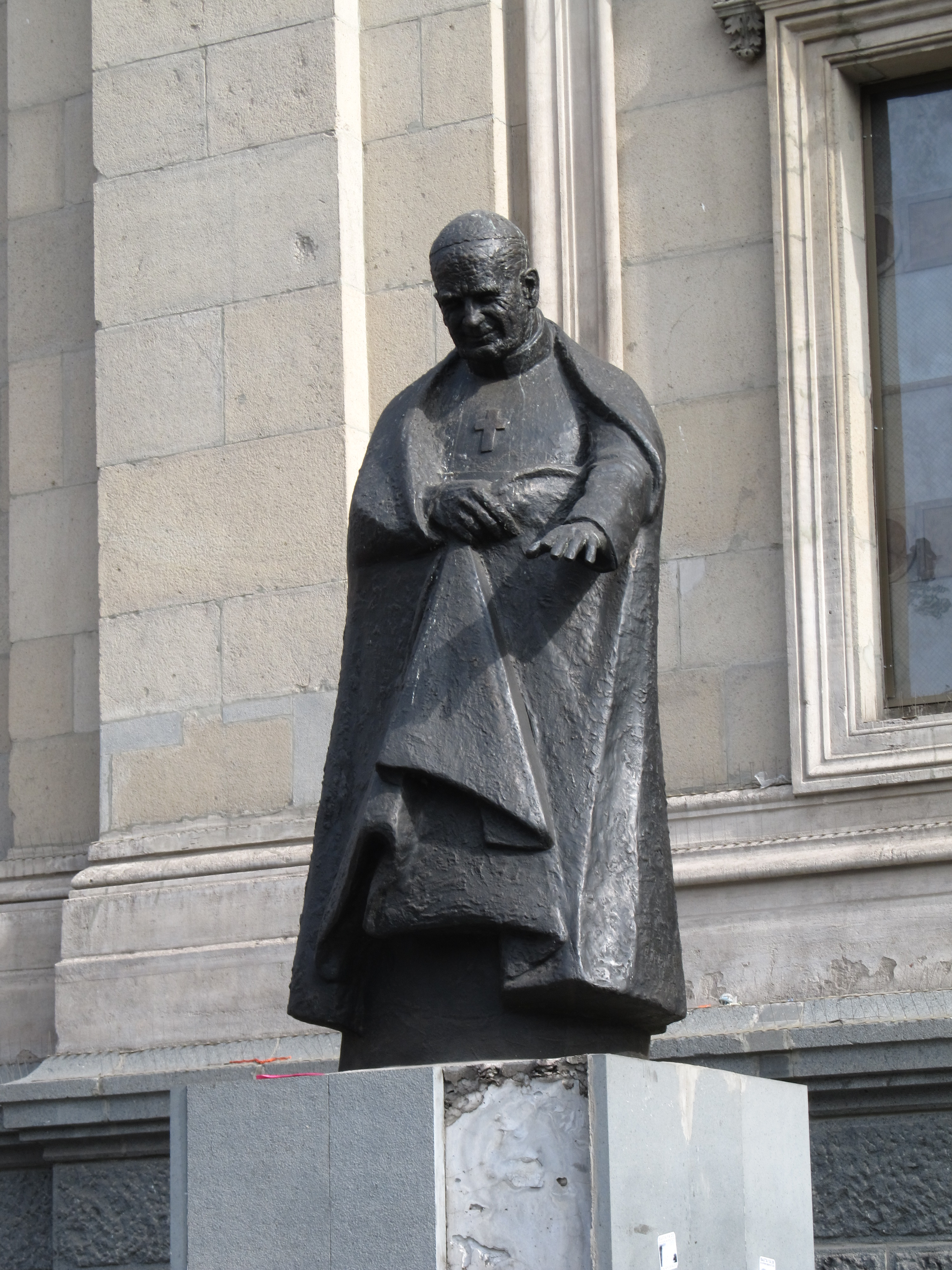
A statue of Silva in front of the cathedral in Santiago

He was an outspoken opponent of General Augusto Pinochet, the military ruler who came to power in a 1973 coup and ruled until 1990, though he initially imagined he could use his friendship with Pinochet to moderate his policies. He eventually became the regime's chief critic. In April 1974, on behalf of Chile's bishops, he issued a statement denouncing the regime for political persecution and economic policies that burdened the poor, calling for ideological reconciliation. He called for the restoration of democracy, aid victims of political persecution in finding employment, and provided legal assistance to political prisoners. He compared Pinochet's oppression of the Church to that experienced by the early Christians at the hands of the Roman Emperors. In the absence of political opposition that had been silenced, imprisoned or exile, the church under his leadership became "the effective resistance to the regime". When the government shut down an ecumenical group fostering social conciliation that Silva founded, Silva re-established it the next day as the Vicariate of Solidarity, headquartered inside the cathedral in Santiago. When the government adopted a conciliatory tone and allowed Silva to visit political prisoners, he collected information on human rights abuses and government-sponsored torture that served as the basis for a report after Pinochet fell from power that listed more than 3,000 Chileans who were killed in prison or disappeared. Government supporters threatened him by desecrating his parents' grave and shooting at his house.

Silva is believed to have played a key role in persuading the governments of Chile and Argentina to allow Pope John Paul II to mediate their border dispute and avoid war in 1978.

Pope John Paul II accepted his resignation as Archbishop of Santiago on 3 May 1983, after twenty-one years of service. Pinochet's wife Lucía Hiriart greeted his retirement with the words "¡Al fin Dios nos ha escuchado!" (At last God has heard us!"). When Chilean Church officials criticized the Pinochet regime the next month, it defended dissent and called for reconciliation, but dropped Silva's direct criticism of the government and his calls for democracy. In 1986, when U.S. Senator Edward M. Kennedy, who sponsored a 1976 amendment banning military assistance to Chile and a critic of the Chilean government, visited Chile. Silva met with Kennedy while his successor as archbishop refused to.

In December 1978, the Vicariate for Solidaity was awarded the United Nations Prize in the Field of Human Rights. The Bruno Kreisky Prize for Services to Human Rights in 1984.

He founded the Academy of Christian Humanism in 1988, an outgrowth of his effort beginning in 1975 to bring intellectuals together to discuss politics, society, economy and culture in Chile.

Silva suffered from Alzheimer's disease near the end of his life and died of a heart attack at a Salesian retirement house in La Florida, at age 91, and was buried in the Metropolitan Cathedral of Santiago. His death left Franz Cardinal König as the only surviving cardinal elevated by John XXIII. The government of Chile declared five days of national mourning after his death and President Eduardo Frei said Silva's death was "a deep pain for the entire nation". The Guardian headlined his obituary: "Pinochet's turbulent priest" and crowds at his funeral chanted "Raul, amigo, el pueblo esta contigo" (Raul, friend, the people are with you).

== Selected writings ==
- El Cardenal Raúl Silva Henríquez nos dijo, 2 volumes (Editorial Tiberíades, 2002) (in Spanish)

Catholic Church titles
Preceded by Rafael Lira	Bishop of Valparaíso; 1959–1961	Succeeded by Emilio Tagle
Preceded by José María Caro	Archbishop of Santiago de Chile; 1961–1983	Succeeded by Juan Francisco Fresno
