= Vicariate of Solidarity =

Chilean human rights organization

The Vicariate of Solidarity (Spanish: La Vicaría de la Solidaridad) was a human rights organization in Chile during the military dictatorship of Augusto Pinochet. A Catholic organisation, it was created by Pope Paul VI at the request of cardinal Raúl Silva Henríquez to replace the Committee of Cooperation for Peace in Chile. The Vicariate of Solidarity aimed to provide assistance to the victims of the Pinochet dictatorship and their families.

== Background ==
On 11 September 1973 a military junta toppled Chilean President Salvador Allende in a coup d'état and installed General Augusto Pinochet as head of the new regime. This was a dictatorial, authoritarian regime which trampled on human rights with the use of torture, disappearances, illegal and secret arrest, and extrajudicial killings. Thousands were being detained, and hundreds killed by the regime. It was in this context, that the first opposition to the Pinochet regime appeared.

The first organized resistance to emerge was in 1973 with the establishment of the Committee of Cooperation for Peace in Chile, or Comité Pro Paz. An ecumenical organization with the support of many religious communities in Chile, the Committee for Peace was active from 1973 to late 1975, until the Pinochet regime demanded its dissolution.

At the same time as the government was arresting its lawyers, Pinochet wrote to Cardinal Raul Silva Henriquez on 11 November 1975 claiming that the Committee was being "used by Marxist-Leninists" to cause an appearance of division between the government and the Roman Catholic Church, and used this as an excuse to demand its dissolution. The Cardinal was obliged to accede to this request, and shut down the Committee.

== Introduction ==
The Vicariate of Solidarity was an agency of the Chilean Catholic Church under the Archdiocese of Santiago. At the request of Cardinal Raul Silva Enriquez, the vicariate's first director, it was set up by Pope Paul VI in 1976 to stop the abduction and ill treatment of Chilean citizens by the government. It ceased operation in 1992, after the military dictatorship of Augusto Pinochet had fallen. From there, the Vicariate of Solidarity was formed as an integral part of the Church that would assume legal defense and human rights issues. The Vicariate began operating on January 1, 1976 as a part of the Catholic Church but only had jurisdiction in Santiago. It continued the work begun by the peace commission and aimed to be a voice against Augusto Pinochet's arbitrary military dictatorship. It stood against the persecution of Chilean citizens and took care of the families of 'desaparecidos' – people who had been disappeared by the government. It received funds from international organizations and collated valuable information during the years of the military regime.

People used secret passages to enter the Vicariate from the adjacent Cathedral to avoid being discovered and although the organization was supposed to be protected from government victimization as an agency of the Catholic Church in Chile, government agents attacked the Vicariate in 1976.

During the fourteen years of its existence, the Vicariate provided a variety of services to the Chilean people including spiritual support, legal services, employment opportunities and health care. The Vicariate received a number of awards for its work in the defense of human rights, including the 1986 Prince of Asturias Award for Peace.

== Activity ==
Through its work under its various directors, the Vicariate became a symbol for the struggle for human rights in Chile. The organization strove to end the military dictatorship of General Augusto Pinochet through a number of ways. It took an aggressive stance for human rights in the face of the dictatorship's blatant disregard for human rights. Over fourteen years, the Vicariate provided legal services for over 250,000 people and opened many legal cases in the defense of accused individuals to decry abuse. Between 1975 and 1979, it is documented to have provided a combination of legal, nutritional and occupational services to about 700,000 Chileans with the aid of international funding.

The Vicariate's records of over 19,000 cases of human rights abuse were used in the years after Chile's return to democracy by the Chilean truth commission. It has provided the largest information base for human rights in the country.

The Vicariate funded anti-Pinochet artwork known as arpilleras and established arpillera workshops where this art could be made. This was one of the few avenues for self-expression in Chile and many women who had 'disappeared' family members came to the workshops to express themselves. The Vicariate carried on funding these workshops until 1992, after Chile had returned to a democracy. It was responsible for providing supplies (fabric, thread etc.), a meeting venue and buying the finished products from the arpilleristas (the manufacturers) to sell them abroad. The tradition of Arpilleras has continued to flourish despite Chile's transition back to democracy.

The Vicariate of Solidarity published a biweekly magazine with a circulation of about 33,000 called Solidaridad. Solidaridad, while also an evangelical tool, reported statistics on everything from unemployment and malnutrition. Solidaridad also documented statistics on individuals who had been arrested or disappeared by the regime. It denounced the human rights abuse by the regime. It contained 24 pages and was free. The Vicariate was composed of departments, which were responsible for implementing its various services and programs.

The Vicariate also published books and brochures. Its activities were deemed hostile toward the government and led to the prosecution, exile, imprisonment and even murder of people associated with it. Jose Manuel Parada, the head of the Department of Analysis of the Vicariate was kidnapped on the street along with a schoolteacher named Manuel Guerrero on March 28, 1985. Their dead bodies were found five days later in a criminal case known as the Caso degollados.

== Guiding principles ==
When not much was being done to combat the human rights violations occurring in Chile, the Vicariate of Solidarity stood up in defense of human rights, with the belief that they were integral teachings of the Christian gospel and therefore part of the Church's to protect in the world. According to its records, "the fundamental inspiration for the Vicariate is the Word of the Lord in its totality, but especially as found in the parable of the Good Samaritan as written in St Luke 10: 25-37." The pastoral principles of the organization at its inception were Solidarity, Witness, Preference for the Poor, Human Rights, A Central Ministry, Integral View of Human Rights and Promotion and Defense. The Vicariate does not discriminate based on religion, however, and its services apply to those of all faiths whose rights have been violated. In return, it does not ask for any benefits, ideological or organizational. In 1981, a committee met to highlight the main characteristics of the Vicariate as an institution of the Church. The report they came up with in the end emphasized:

- Its promotion and defense of human rights, understood integrally, but with special preference for the poor.

- The promotional nature of its solidarity work, which implies a strong role as an educator for justice.

- Its witness as the Church incarnate, the Church in the world.

- Its condition as a sacrament of communion, a prophetic sign of contradiction, and a voice of the voiceless.

- The special way it combines hierarchy and laity, with an ecumenical and pluralistic spirit these being the signs of a missionary Church carrying out a "frontier" ministry.

== Leadership and structure ==
=== Legal Department ===
The Legal Department within the Vicariate is responsible for the defense and promotion of human rights, which is carried out through two means: the legal route and public denunciation. It follows a couple of guidelines to keep it in check, as well as so those who seek its help know whether or not it will be able to provide it to them. First, it abides by the fact that "the right to life is sacred, and predominates over any other consideration". Second, only those who ask for assistance will be given it. Third, the principal criterion of gaining the assistance of the Vicariate is that the person who is requesting aid has been the victim of a human rights violation. Fourth, the Vicariate does not provide legal defense aid for common crimes or "behavior affecting the human rights of innocent third parties". People seeking help for these issues will be directed to an alternative legal service, however. Lastly, the truth is always adhered to, due to the nature of what is being defended, and also to protect the reputation of the Vicariate's proceedings. Some characteristic features of the Vicariate are legal action that is free, the right to an intransigent defense, prompt and efficient representation, solidary representation, professional and scientific rigor, educational perspective, historical legacy, activities derived from the absence of democracy, and security of legal aid.

=== Department of Zones ===
The Department of Zones is concerned with spreading the benefits of the Vicariate to those who would not usually be reached by help. The help provided generally includes projects assisting the poor and marginalized who have been victims of human rights violations in the various pastoral zones that comprise the Archdiocese. The Department coordinates zone teams and the provision of certain services designed to improve zones while saving resources. It works with the Church of Santiago to organize and coordinate support for people who have been affected by problems such as unemployment, hunger, health housing, education, and others. The Department follows the guidelines indicated by the Council in Apostolicam Actuositatem No. 8, which states that it will "Respond to demands for justice before all else so that these demands are not confused with those of charity; suppress the causes, and not only the effects, of evil and organize relief in such a way that those who receive it are progressively liberated from external dependency, thereby becoming more and more sufficient unto themselves."

=== Department of the Magazine Solidaridad ===
This department is responsible for the bi-weekly publication of the magazine Solidaridad, which is used as an evangelizing tool of the Church of Santiago. The magazine is also a testimony to all of the services the Vicariate offers, and is used as a form of social communication through the church to inform people freely, objectively, opportunely and truthfully, in a manner that was not being provided by other media sources during the coup. It is referred to by the Church as "the voice of those without voice." The magazine attempts to "oppose ideological manipulation, transculturation, and the propaganda of materialism" to educate readers on what it considers the true values of justice, liberty, peace, truth and solidarity views to be.

The magazine has nine sections: Editorial, National, Main Reports, The Church in the World, Culture, Workers, Young World, The Past Two Weeks, and Short Notices, along with an insert titled "Let's Learn in Solidarity."

=== Department of Solidary Education ===
This department was created on May 2, 1983, to ensure that the Vicariate's activities, both individual and collective, obtain an educational perspective whenever possible.

=== Support Department ===
This department's main focus is supporting the other departments in the Vicariate with Documentation, Publication, and Administration.

The Documentation Center contains national and foreign material concerning the Church and human rights. It serves both the Vicariate and other religious, academic, journalistic and research institutions.

The Publications Unit edits the material the Vicariate needs to work.

The Administration Unit is responsible for all administrative duties, including upkeep and maintenance, equipment and installations, and safety. It distributes publications, magazines and carries other general duties. It is also in charge of organizing special events.

=== The Finance Department ===
This department consists of two Units: The Projects Unit and the Accounts and Budgets Unit. Overall, the criteria regarding finances is conservative, with the objective of minimizing possible financial risk.

=== Structure ===
The Vicariate is structured in the following way: at its head is the Vicar, who has the Vicar's Council and Executive Secretary under him. The Executive Secretary controls all of the Departments, as well as the Council of Department Heads, the Personnel Unit and the Public Relations Unit.

=== Key leaders ===
Cardinal Raúl Silva Henríquez: founder.

Cardinal Juan Francisco Fresno

Vicar of Santiago Rev. Juan de Castro

== See also ==
- Chile under Pinochet
- Human rights violations in Pinochet's Chile

== Bibliography ==
1. Walker, Kristen (27 December 2013). "Chilean Women's Resistance in the Arpillera Movement". Centre tricontinental.
2. "Chile. Religion in Historical Perspective". country-data.com.
3. Louis Bickford; Debra Schultz (2009). "Memory and Justice: a Brief and Selected History of a Movement". Memory and justice. Archived from the original on 3 December 2011.
4. "José Manuel Parada". Memoria Chilena, Biblioteca Nacional de Chile (in Spanish).
5. "1988 - Vicaría de Solidaridad". UN. Archived from the original on 30 September 2004.
6. "Stages of Repression and Legal Strategy for the Defense of Human Rights in Chile: 1973-1980". Remember-Chile. 11 September 1973.
