= Carlos Pedraza Olguín =

Chilean painter

- Born: December 31, 1913; Taltal, Chile
- Died: November 20, 2000 (aged 86); Santiago, Chile
- Education: University of Chile
- Occupation: Painter

Carlos Pedraza Olguín (31 December 1913 – 30 November 2000) was a Chilean painter. He won the National Prize of Art of Chile in 1979.

Pedraza was born in Taltal on 31 December 1913. He began his studies at Barros Arana National Boarding School where he was classmates with Jorge Millas, Luis Oyarzún Peña, and Nicanor Parra. The three of them began publishing Revista Nueva in 1935. After completing his studies there he attended the School of Fine Arts at the University of Chile. He became an assistant in Jorge Caballero's class.

Pedraza was a member of the Generation of '40, a group of students who trained at the University of Chile and participated in the Official Salon of 1941. Other member included Augusto Barcia, Ximena Cristi, and Aída Poblete. He was noted for his still lifes and flowers as well as landscapes. His work had expressive use of color applied in a thick impasto.

Between 1955 and 1958 he was Secretary of the Faculty of Fine Arts at the University of Chile. From 1960 to 1963 he served as Director and then as Dean of the Faculty of Fine Arts between 1963 and 1966.

He became a full member of the Chilean Academy of Fine Arts on 30 August 1977.

Pedraza was included in many group exhibits in Chile and abroad. Of special note are the 1942 exhibition at the Toledo Museum of Art and the First São Paulo Biennial in 1956. His paintings have been included in museum collections in Chile and elsewhere, such as the Hermitage Museum in Saint Petersburg, Russia.

Pedraza died in Santiago on 20 November 2000.

== Awards ==
- "Friends of Art" Award at the Salón Oficial de Artes Plásticas (1936)
- First Prize, Official Salon, Santiago (1941)
- First Medal Painting National Salon (1949)
- First prize, XVI Viña del Mar Summer Salon (1949)
- "Carlos Ossandón G." Office Award at the National Salon (1949)
- "Rafael Molina Gamboa" Award at the National Salon (1949)
- "University of Chile" Prize at Official Salon (1954)
- University of Chile Painting Prize at the Salón Oficial de Artes Plásticas (1964)
- National Art Prize (1979)
