= Chilean art =

Chilean art refers to all kinds of visual art developed in Chile, or by Chileans, from the arrival of the Spanish conquerors to the modern day. It also includes the native pre-Columbian pictorial expression on modern Chilean territory.

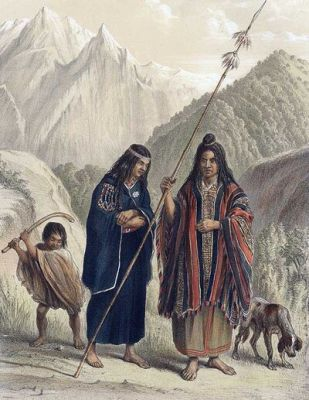
Mapuches expressed their art through weaving and clothing. Machi attire was important in ceremonies.

== Pre-Columbian art ==
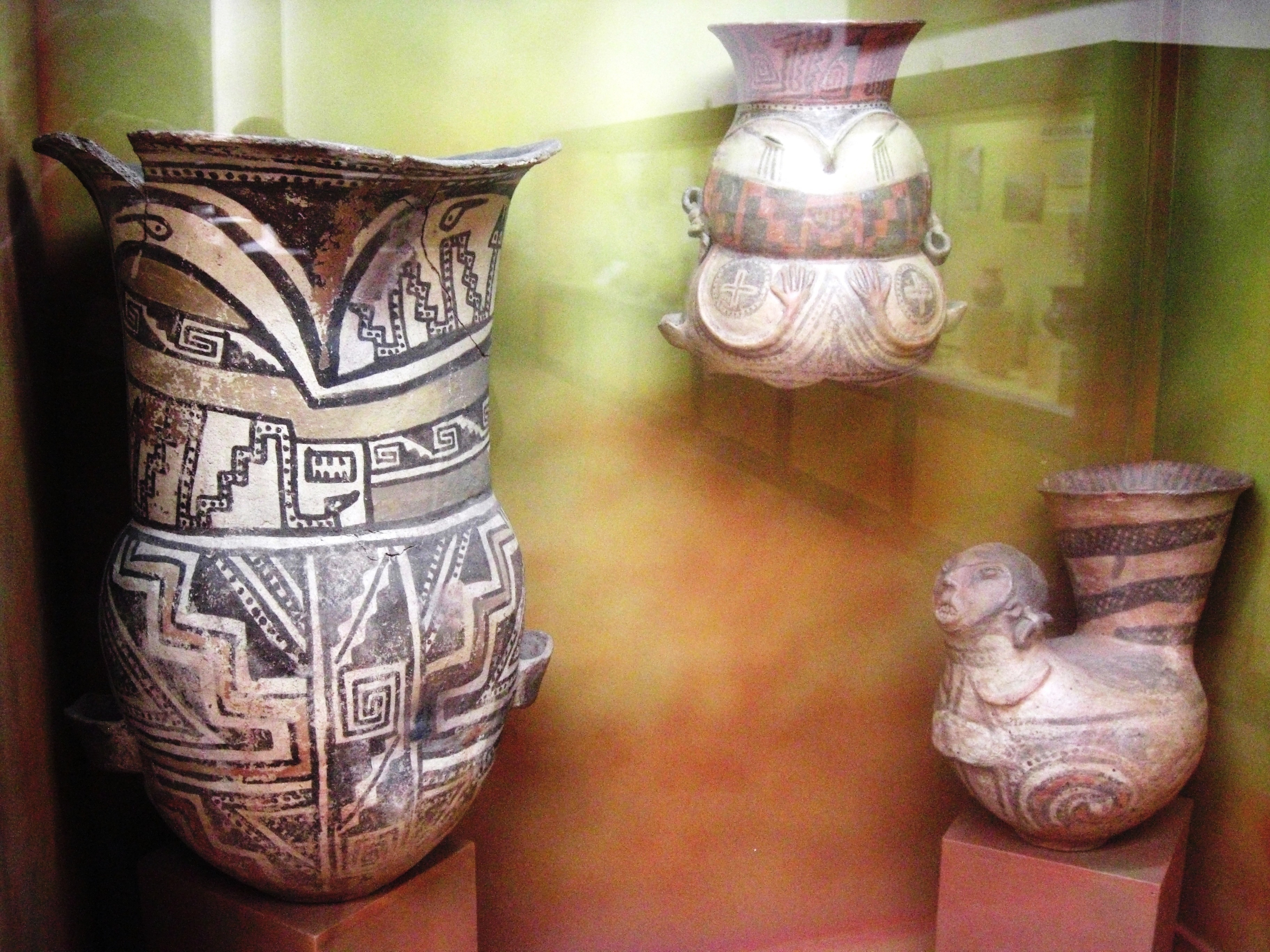
Ceramics were the greatest artistic contribution of the northern peoples. These examples of Diaguita ceramics show this people's fascination with geometric figures.

Prehistoric painting in Chile, also called pre-Columbian Chilean painting, refers to any type of painting or painting technique used to represent objects or people during the period before the Spanish conquest. Developed prior to the existence of written sources, study of this period is based on the material remains and vestiges of the cultures that developed.

The beginning of pre-Columbian art in Chile coincided with the appearance of indigenous cultures in the territory, and ended around the start of the Spanish conquest of Chile around 1500AD. After this period, indigenous art was virtually eliminated by the Catholic community as part of the process of converting native people. (see also: Catholic Church and the Age of Discovery, Spanish missions in South America).

Prehistoric art is closely related to the cave paintings and petroglyphs developed during the prehispanic period, especially in the extreme North of Chile.

=== History ===
Art historian Luis Álvarez Urquieta was one of the first authors to raise the issue of pre-Columbian art in his book Pintura en Chile ("Painting in Chile"). The author explains that most of the painting developed before the arrival of the Spanish was done by the Atacameño and Araucano cultures, and also identified Diaguita and Inca influences.

The use of art in this time could be aesthetic, practical, ritual or religious, depending on the culture and the resources available. Animal figures and symbols abound but images of people did not appear unless they were important or had some magical significance for the tribe.

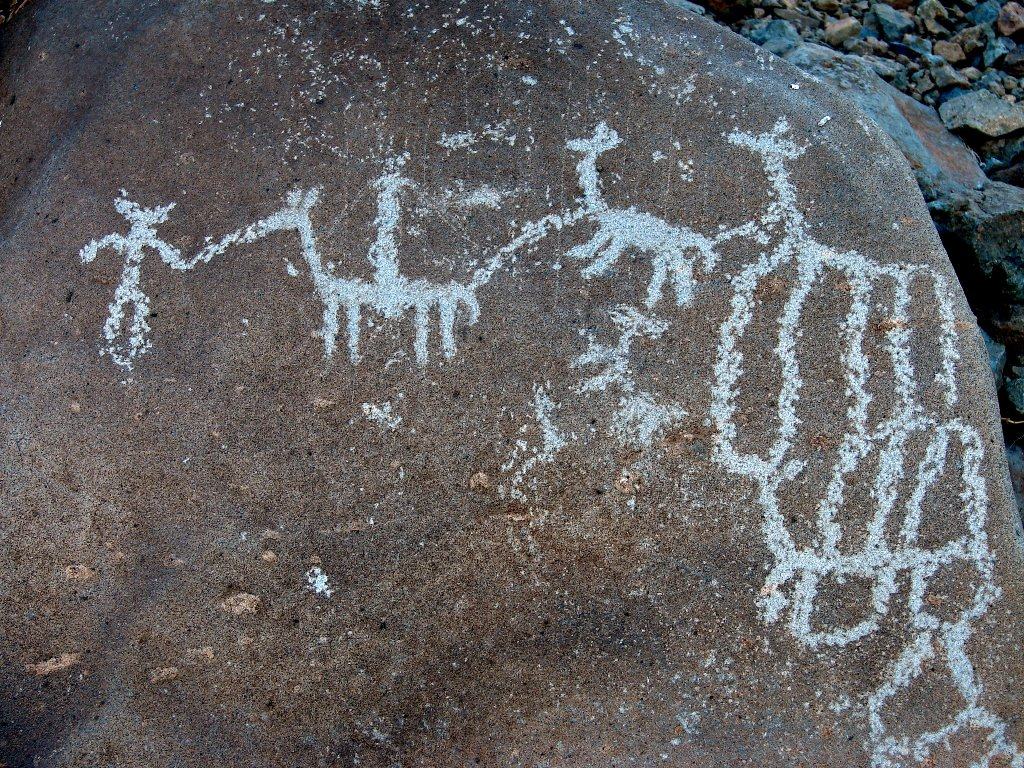
Petroglyphs south of Atacama, Chile, near to the facilities of La Silla Observatory, Atacama Region, northern Chile.

The cultural references varied depending on the area where the people lived. Northern cultures, like the Diaguita, preferred geometric figures and used pottery and petroglyphs extensively. The Mapuche people, based in the centre of the modern Chilean territory, were more focused on the rituals performed by the machi (the Mapuche shamans), as well as their gods and deities. They developed colourful ritual textiles, used by the machi, and pottery specifically designed for use in burials. Their designs did also include some northern influences.

In the far south, there is some evidence of petroglyph art but less than in the north. Notable among the southern cultures was the artwork of the Selkʼnam people, also known as Ona, who decorated their bodies as part of a religious ritual.

Overall, prehistoric native art throughout the Americas was almost entirely destroyed by the Spanish conquerors, and Chile did not escape this. Some remains were preserved in the north, where, thanks to the preservative qualities of the arid Atacama Desert, certain objects of pictorial heritage value have survived preserved in time.

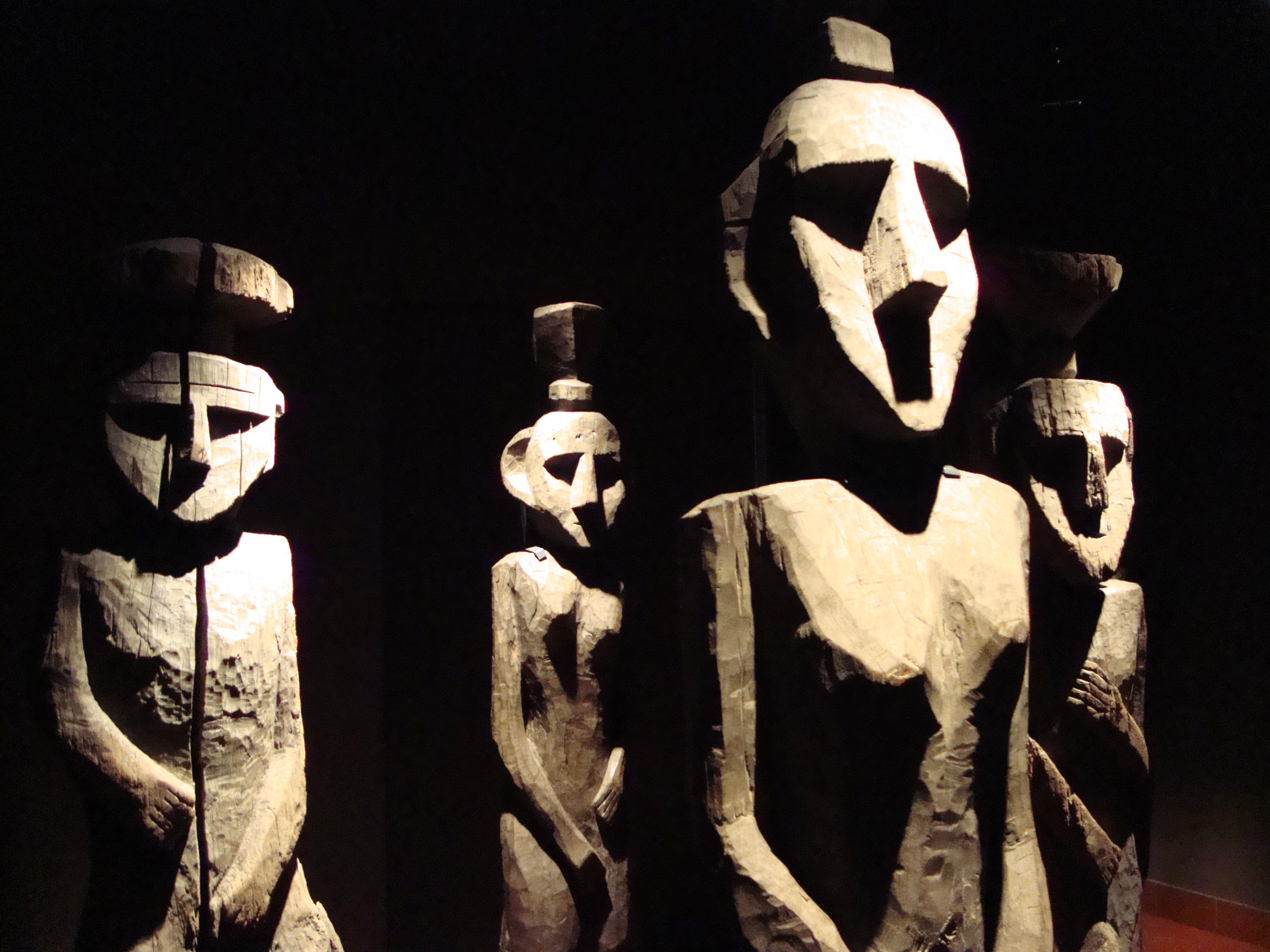
Wooden Mapuche sculptures in the Museo Chileno de Arte Precolombino, Santiago.

== Colonial art ==
Chilean colonial art refers to art produced in the Chilean colonial period that extended from 1598 AD to 1810 AD. The period saw a mixing of European techniques with native cultural heritage.

Artistically, the period began around the mid-17th century and was led at first by the Spanish Jesuits and by working artisans who lacked specialized artistic training. It was directly influenced by European artistic trends such as Mannerism and Baroque, but, like all other Chilean culture that developed during this period, it was also influenced by native art and culture, creating a new style. Art was seen as vital for the education and religious conversion of the indigenous people and played an important role in the transmission of Spanish dominance and Catholic world vision.

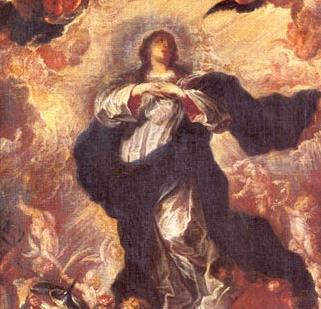
The Immaculate Conception (Anonymous), produced about 1680. Currently the “Day of the Immaculate Conception” is celebrated on December 8 in Chile. It is noteworthy that the first paintings in Chile were almost entirely related to religion, with painting seen as a tool for educating and evangelizing the indigenous people.

=== History ===
Colonial painting developed in a time when South American countries were not politically or geographically grouped as they are today and had not yet formed national identities, art and cultural individuality. Just as it is difficult for historians to define the indigenous art of each country, because there were no geographical demarcations or pictorial characteristics endemic to the modern territories, it is also difficult to speak precisely of Peruvian, Argentinian or Chilean colonial art. Some countries, like Mexico, Ecuador and Peru, had their own art schools where local artists could work and study. Chile did not, however, because it did not represent a major interest for the Spanish government, so it relied on importing pieces from foreign art schools.

Overall, colonial painting in Chile and across all Latin America was influenced by Spanish art, which taught the anatomical study of bodies, the chiaroscuro style, and subjects clothed in aristocratic attire. For the Spanish conquerors, craft and artisan work was seen as demeaning and antithetical to nobility, so they chose to leave this work to the “mestizos” and native peoples, instead importing and admiring European art.

According to art historian Luis Álvarez Urquieta, Spanish painting of the time incorporated Asian influences as a result of Spanish trade with the far east. It is from here, he claims, that Spanish painting inherited its color palette, the expressionless faces of its subjects, and the profusion of golden shades. The same author also emphasizes the influence of indigenous people on Chilean art, which can be seen in the simplicity of the composition of religious scenes, as well as local traditions, customs and mannerisms represented in the paintings.

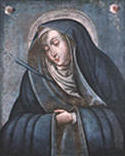
The Virgin of Sorrow. The collector and art historian Luis Álvarez Urquieta, believed that this painting was the first made by any artist in Chilean territory. The influence of the Quito school is noticeable, it shows the abnormal distribution of forms and the artist's lack of knowledge of perspective. This is partly because most of the painters of the time were not professional but amateur.

In the opinion of Álvarez Urquieta, technical skill was somewhat neglected in early colonial painting, with more importance given to the objects being painted and their educational use. Most American colonial painting shows a lack of study of light and shade and poor use of perspective and proportion, though it has been praised for its liveliness and use of colour, as well as its documentary value in representing the social integration of the Spanish and American peoples.

Art historians Ivelíc and Galaz agree that painting in the early Americas lost some of the academic rigor and technique of Europe in the process of mixing with native styles, as Álvarez Urquieta has also claimed.

=== Main influences ===
Jesuit influences

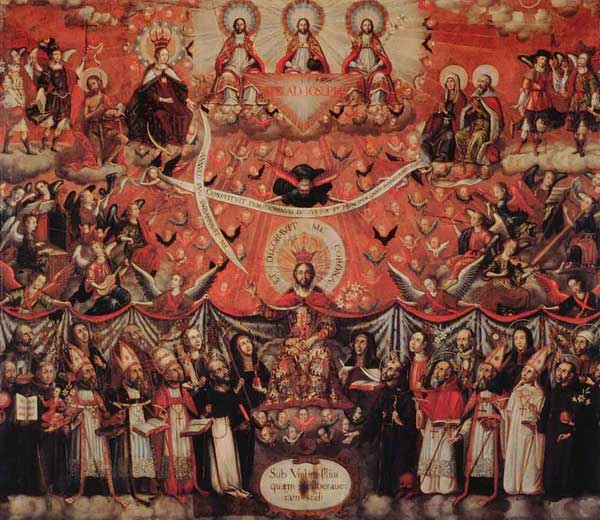
There are not many colonial art museums, because of the small number of works produced during these years. However, the Society of Jesus, faithful to their artistic tradition, stored some old pictures on the walls of their monasteries, churches and convents.

Chilean artists primarily focused on religious themes, which were most in demand and therefore more lucrative. Religious paintings tended to be displayed in churches, cloisters and convents - their logical destination, considering that the majority were commissioned by members of the church or as donations to the church. They are known for their lack of facial expression and proportion in their portrayal of human figures, and the lack of interest they show for subjects like landscape or nature.

The Compañía de Jesús (Jesuits) were one of the most influential religious groups, contributing to the expansion of the fine arts throughout Latin America as well as the monastic educational tradition. The Jesuits were among the first to teach the native peoples European artistic techniques and worked to preserve the symbolism of the Christian artistic legacy. They also provided excellent conditions for the preservation of artwork (in churches, cloisters, etc.), until they were expelled from the Latin American territories by the Spanish authorities.

The Jesuits promoted and developed skills such as clock making, carpentry, silversmithing, sculpture and portrait painting. One such skilled Jesuit was Ignacio Andía y Varela, who would later sculpt the Spanish coat of arms that now sits upon Cerro Santa Lucía hill in Santiago, among other works.

Many of the colonial artworks preserved until present day by the Jesuits are found in their churches, such as the high altar at the San Francisco Church, Santiago de Chile which holds the Virgen Dolorosa (Virgin of Sorrow, 1576), one of the first colonial paintings ever produced in Chile.

San Francisco Church also holds another of the most important paintings of the period, the Genealogía de los Franciscanos (Genealogy of the Franciscans), an oil of over four meters length and width. The canvas has 644 small portraits, crowned by the Virgin Mary, and reads: "For the honour and glory of our Lord and the Holy Mother Church, this tree of the religion is dedicated to the parents of the order." The artist who produced the work is anonymous, as decreed by the Jesuit code of humility, with only the date the work was finished included in the signature. Another notable Jesuit painting is the Mesa de la Cena (Supper Table, 1652), five meters high by three meters wide, which was formerly hung in the sacristy of Santiago Cathedral.

One important Jesuit artist was the Bavarian monk Carlos Haymhausen, who arrived in Chile in the mid-18th century. The monk was a great lover of the arts and, along with Ambrosio Santelices and Fermin Morales, he is one of the first professional painters recorded in the former Chilean territory. The historian Uriqueta viewed Haymhausen as a model for future generations of painters because, in addition his own talent as an artist, he brought with him other foreign artists who would pave the future of Chile's national art.

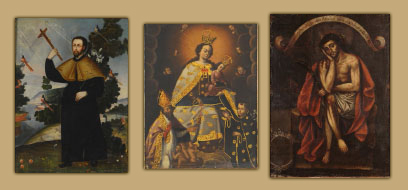
The Casa del Arte gallery in Concepción keeps examples Chilean of colonial painting. Note that the paintings are anonymous according to the custom of the Society of Jesus.

Quito School

The “Escuela Quiteña” (Quito School) was also influential in the colonial period. Ever since the conquest of the Americas, Quito, Ecuador had attracted a large number of artists from Europe, contributing to the founding of an important school that would influence art across Latin America, including Chile.

The school was founded by Franciscan friars in Quito and was deeply religious. The most important painter from this school is Miguel de Santiago, considered one of the most noteworthy painters of the entire colonial period. Miguel de Santiago raised Latin American painting to a higher level, leaving behind a great number of fine paintings.

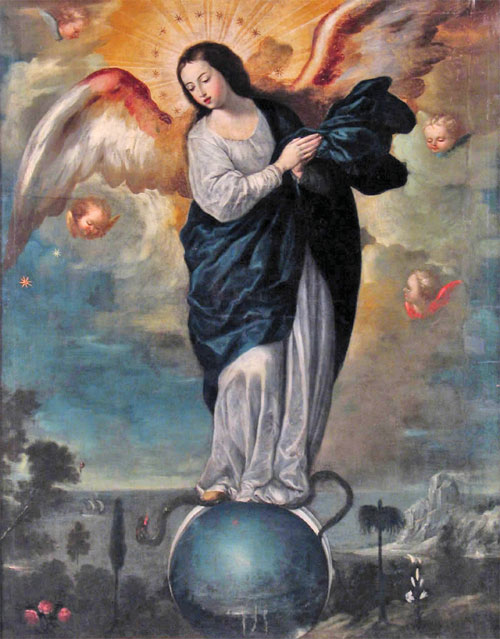
Winged Virgin of the Apocalypse by Miguel de Santiago, one of the leading exponents of the Quito School of the seventeenth century, and an important influence on the Chilean art of the time.

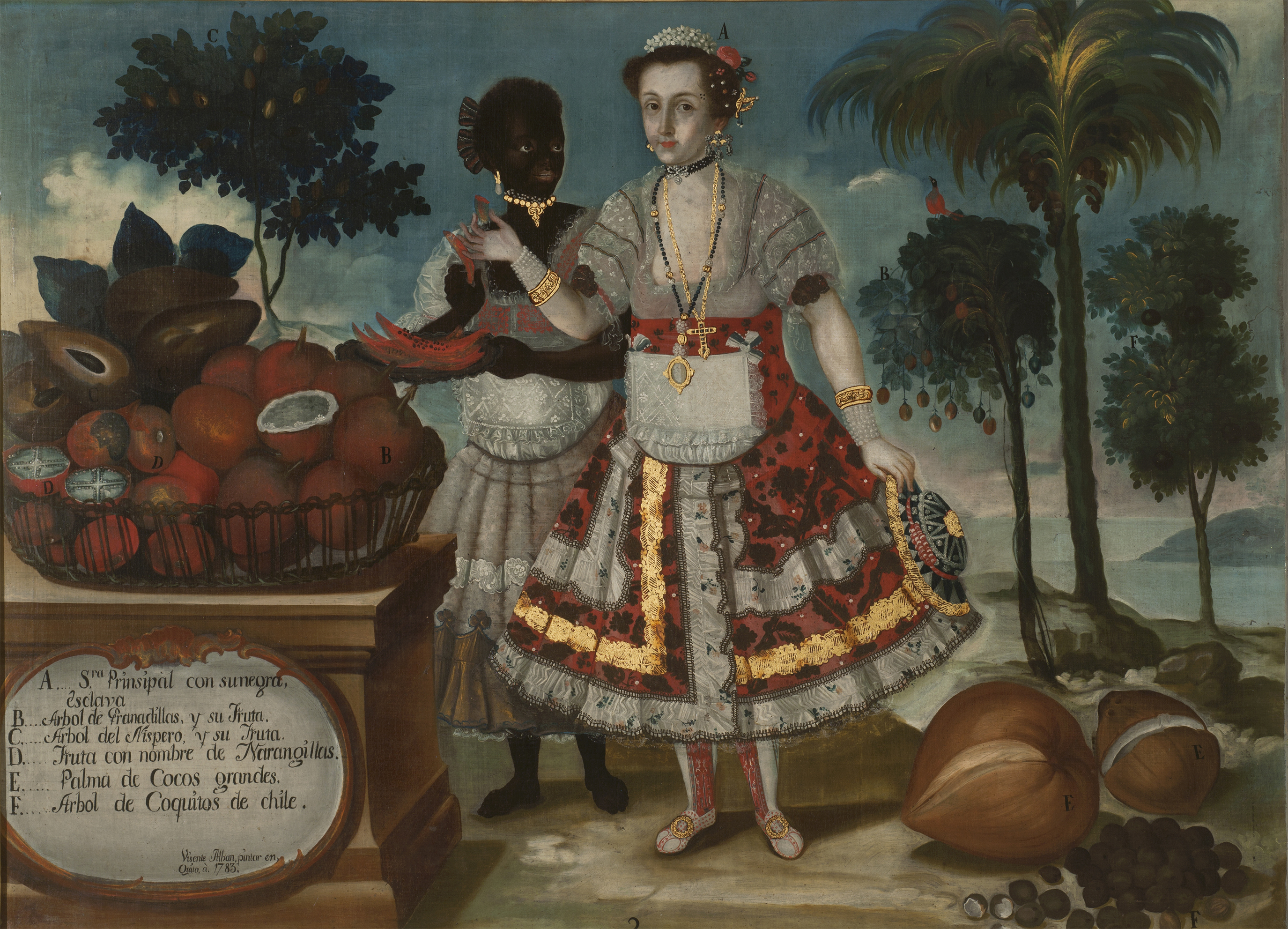
Quito lady, portrayed with her black slave. Vicente Alban, 18th century.

However, the greatest Quito pieces tended to be kept by the artistic patrons of Ecuador and Peru and few filtered through to Chile. According to the historian Álvarez Uriqueta, Chile's Spanish rulers did not have the resources to spend on art, preoccupied as they were with Chile's extreme geography and defiant Mapuche people, who continued to fight the conquistadors throughout the colonial period. Because of this, while the influence of Quito school is undeniable in Chile, it is not as strong as in other Latin American countries.

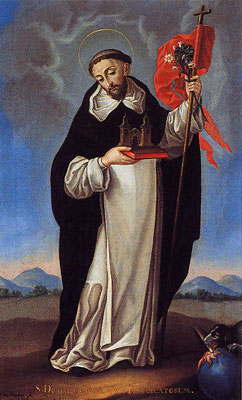
Santo Domingo, 1817, by Peruvian artist José Gil de Castro. Gil de Castro is known by art historians as a transition painter. His arrival in Chile marks the end of colonial painting and the beginning of the traveller painters of the nineteenth century, also called precursors of Chilean painting.

European influences

During the government of Isabella I of Castile and Carlos V in Spain, art was considered a vital tool for the religious conversion and education of the people in Spain's conquered territories in the Americas. The prevailing artistic style at the time was the Mannerism, which represented the Christian ideals of the age.

However, as wealthy Europeans began to commission portraits of themselves and their families, reducing their donations to the church, this decreased the production of religious art in Europe and its Latin American territories during the 18th century. Painting of aristocratic origin stopped being a tool for social change and education and started to become a symbol of wealth.

The Flemish School, with its use of Chiaroscuro, also influenced colonial art in Chile. Among its exponents were the Italian painters Angelino Medoro, Bernardo Bitti and Mateo Perez de Alessio who brought the first engravings and religious prints to Chile.

=== Legacy ===
The colonial period marked a profound change in Chilean art from the previous pre-Columbian period, with a concerted effort to eliminate the vestiges of the pagan culture that existed prior to the conquest. However, pre-Columbian painting survived due to the process of integration that occurred during this period, whereby the symbols and customs found expression in colonial work. Generally, the colonial period is considered to end with the appearance of José Gil de Castro, an important painter of Peruvian origin, which began the tradition of the traveling painters in Chile.

=== Gallery ===
Some José Gil de Castro paintings
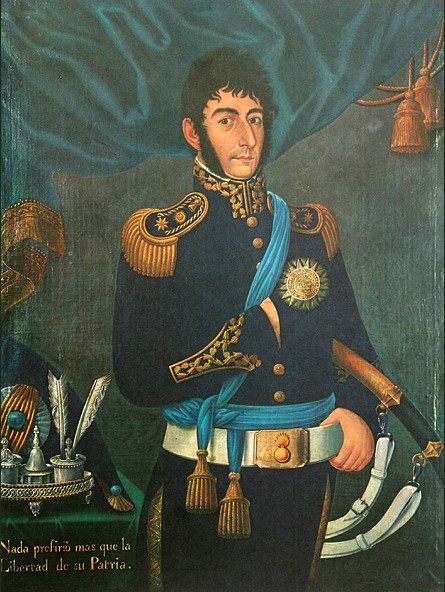
José de San Martín was an Argentine general and the primary leader of the southern part of South America's successful struggle for independence.

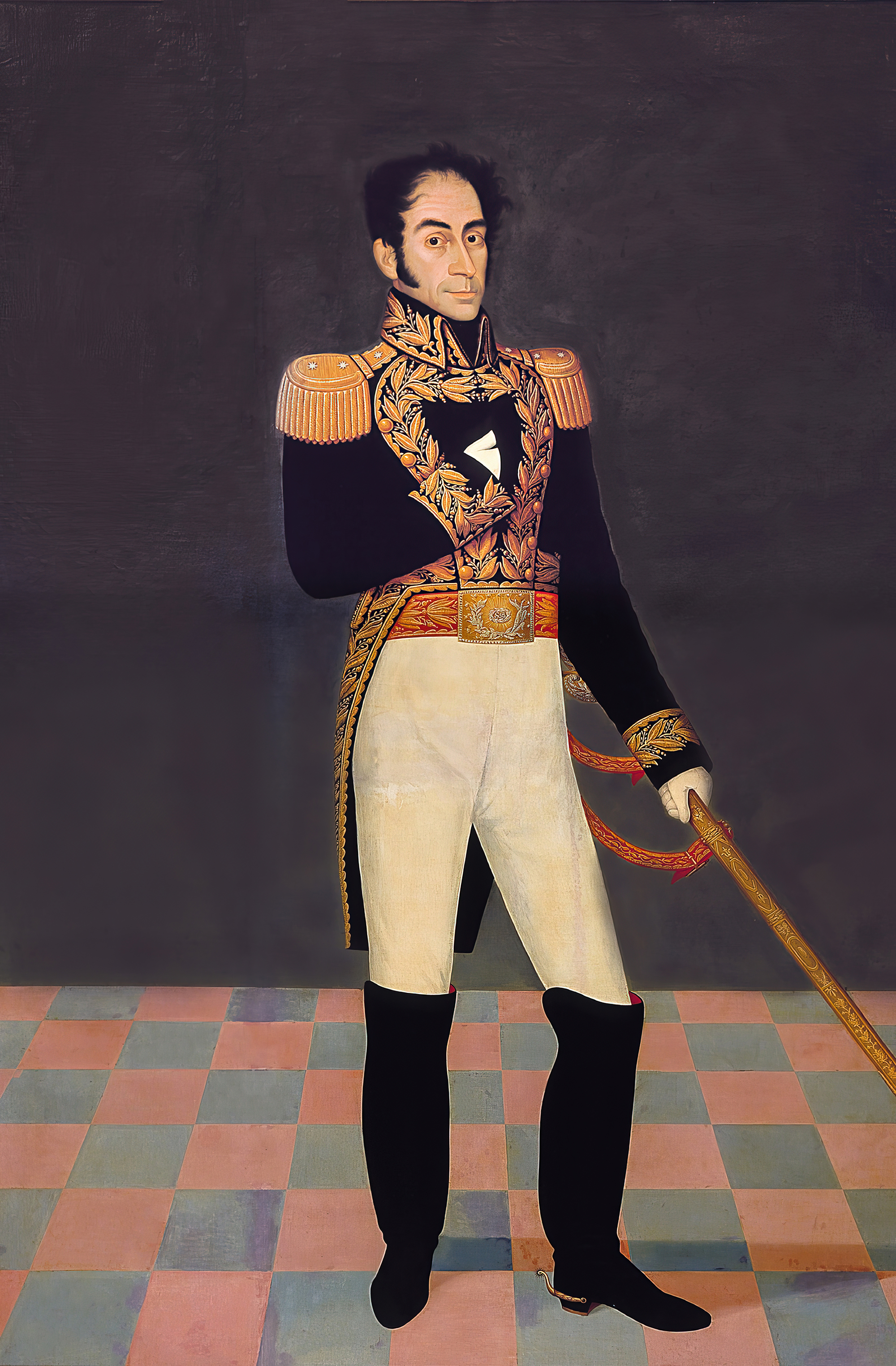
A portrait of Simón Bolivar painted in Lima in 1825 by José Gil de Castro. Bolivar was a Venezuelan military and political leader who played a key role in Latin America's successful struggle for independence.

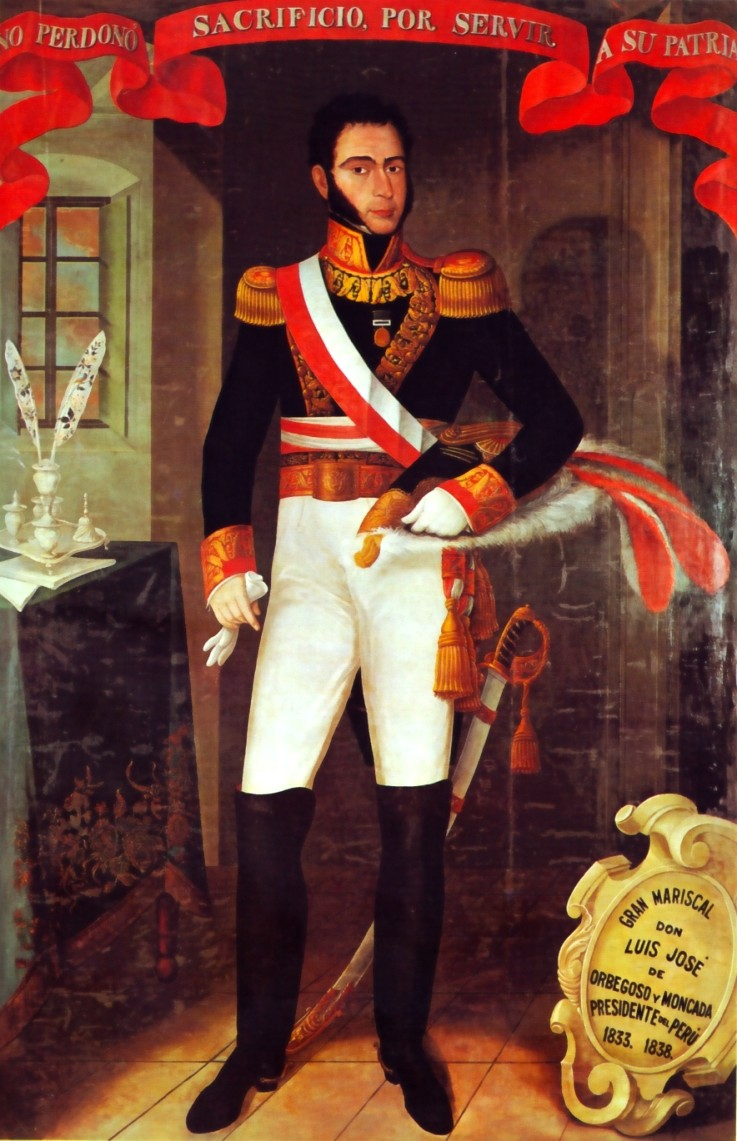
Luis José de Orbegoso, a Peruvian soldier and politician, was president of Peru from 1833 to 1836.

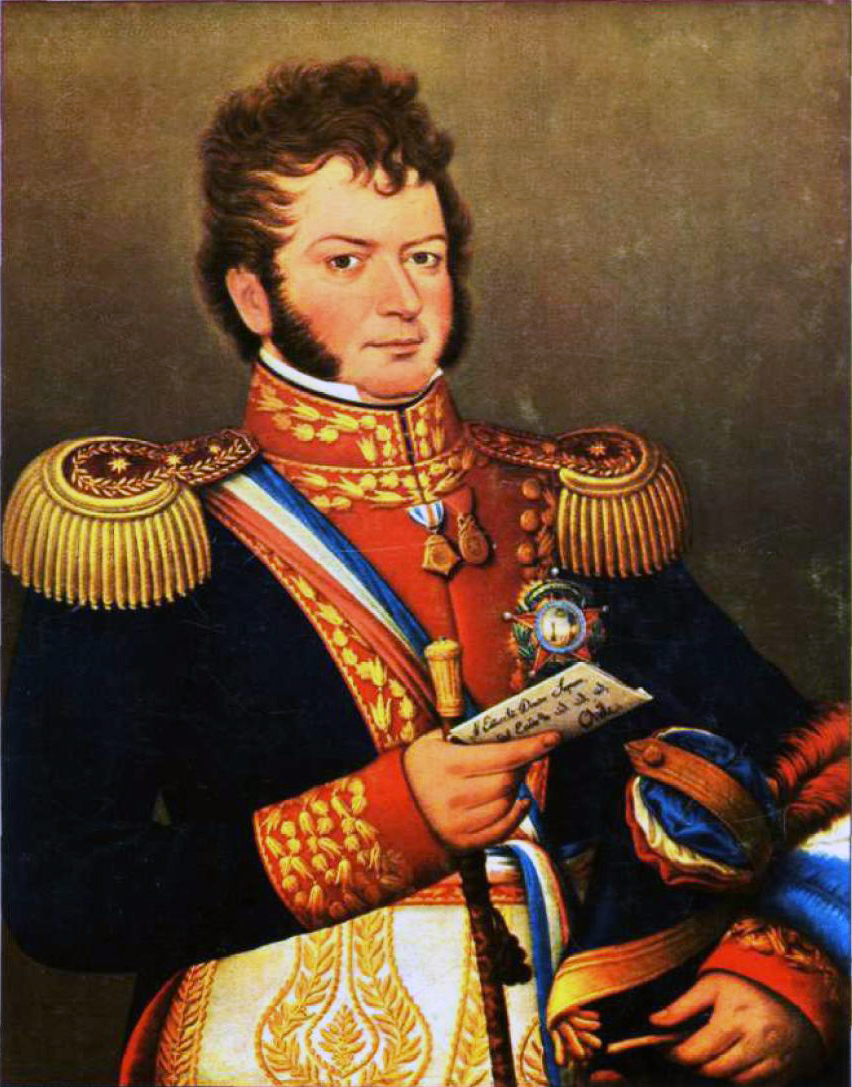
Bernardo O'Higgins was a Chilean independence leader, considered one of Chile's founding fathers.

== 19th Century - The Traveller-Artists ==
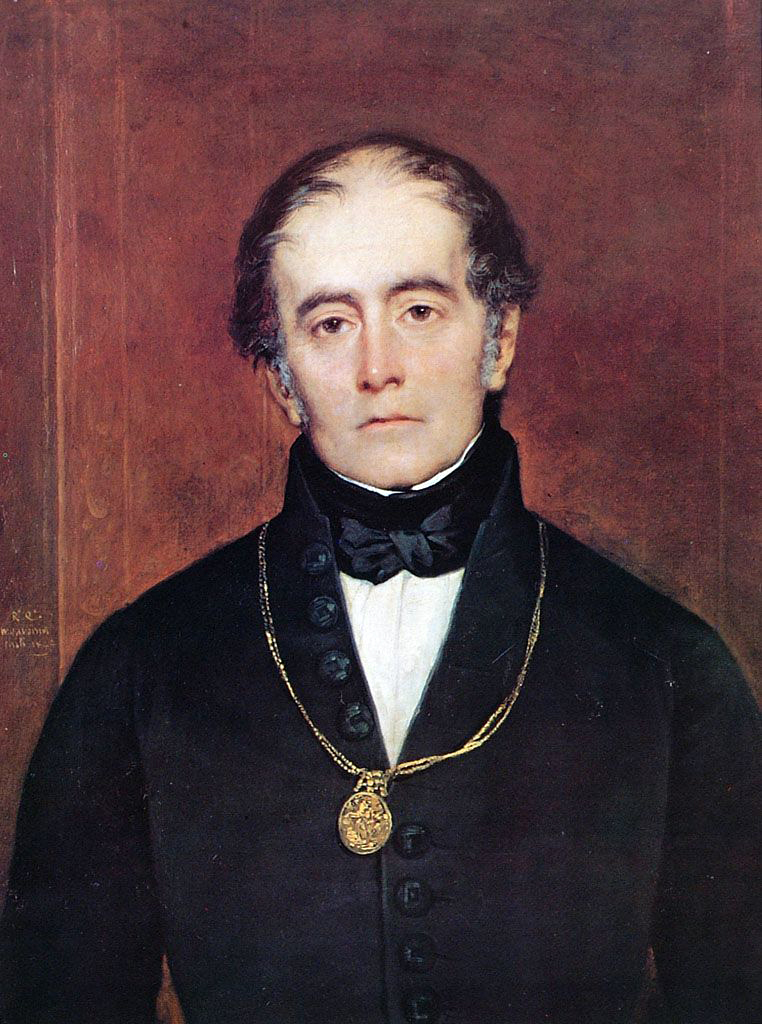
Portrait of Andrés Bello by Raymond Monvoisin

"The traveller-artists of the 19th century", as they were known, began working at the start of Chile's independence and their influence remains to this day. The paintings and sketches created by these artists were, and continue to be, important in helping to understand, in a didactical way, the early years of republican existence, and are a graphic documentation of the battles that occurred during the country's independence and conflicts with neighbouring countries.

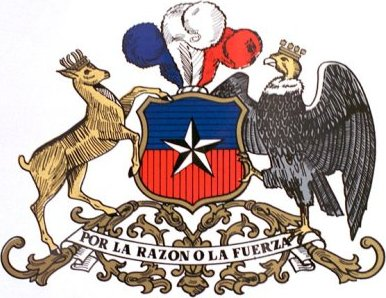
Chilean Coat of Arms, designed by Charles C. Wood Taylor.

According to the authors Ivelíc and Galaz, this artistic period should not be referred to as a "generation" or a "movement" as the precursors of Chilean painting did not form a group. They are related only in a chronological sense as they arrived in the country in close succession of one another.

History

The beginning of the independence revolution forced Chilean art into the background for a short period. However, soon after the process of independence began, various foreign artists came to Chile on scientific expeditions and to make documentaries, bringing with them their tastes and thematic frameworks, that would go on to influence the future direction of Chilean painting.

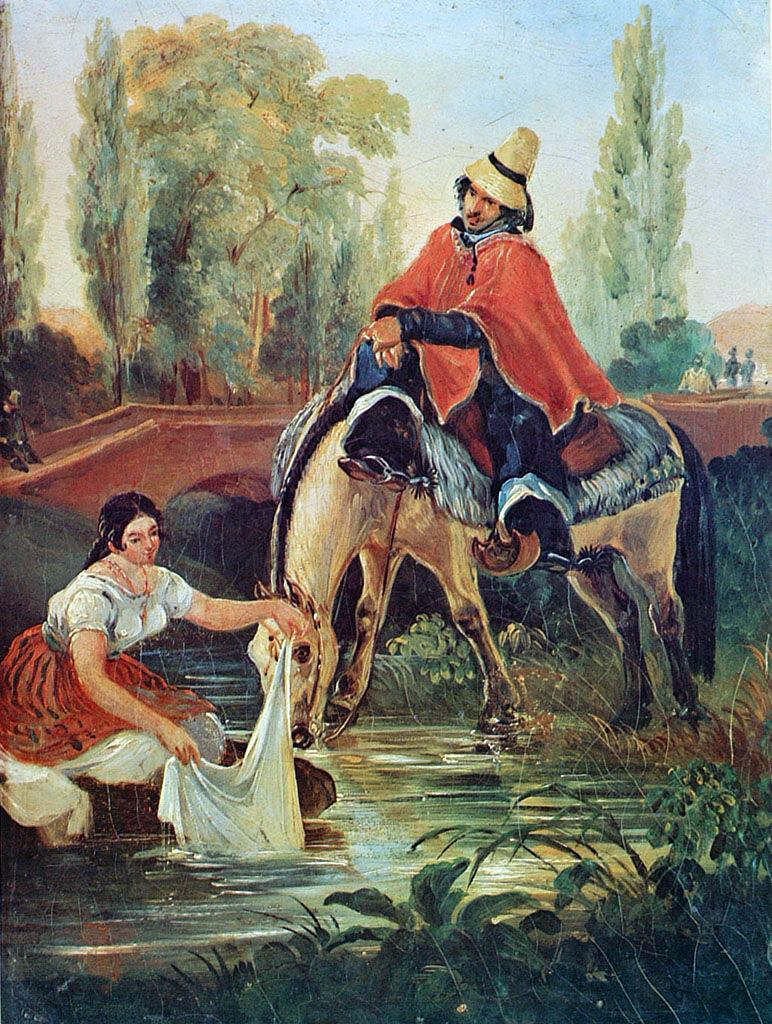
El huaso y la lavandera (Huaso and the Laundress) by Mauricio Rugendas

This process created the initial signs of Chilean nationality and the consequent ideas of Chilean style. However, this originality would not be clearly recognisable in Chile until well into the 19th century. The concept of “Pintores viajeros del siglo XIX” (Traveller-Artists of the 19th century) was created by historian Luis Álvarez Urquieta, referring to the group of painters who arrived independently of one another in Chile towards the end of the 17th and the beginning of the 18th century. There is a big difference between the style and themes of colonial art and those of this particular period, which lasted until approximately the 19th century. The latter was more varied and rich, ranging from portraits of famous people by artists such as José Gil de Castro and Raymond Monvoisin to the representation of folkloric scenes of independence by the Chilean Manuel Antonio Caro and the German Mauricio Rugendas, [C1] to scientific and bibliographic representation of plants, animals and cities by Claudio Gay, Charles Thorold Wood and the scientist Charles Darwin.

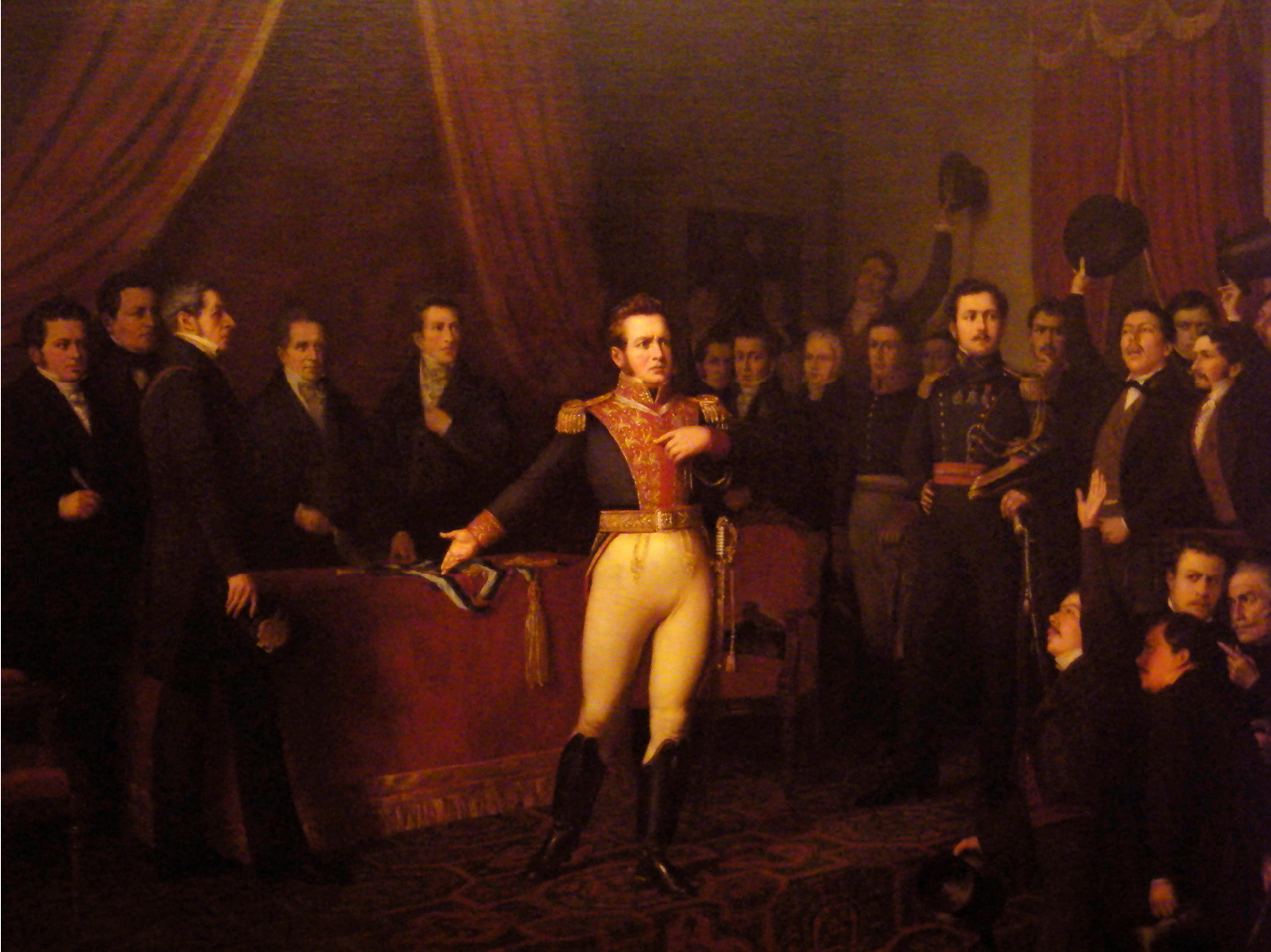
The Abdication of Bernardo O'Higgins by Manuel Antonio Caro. The work represents the moment when O'Higgins was forced to resign his office

Painting in the previous period was characterised by its functionality in the task of evangelisation and education. The new trend, however, appreciated art for its intrinsic aesthetic importance, and in this way, painting was no longer regarded as a complement to other arts and science and gained its own value.

Chilean art suffered through the civil conflict, and it is very difficult to identify a particular trend or style from that era. During the period of the traveller-artists, realism, neoclassicism and romanticism coexisted without overshadowing one another, except in some cases where certain styles prevailed but for short periods only.

Chronologically speaking, this was a period of profound upheaval in Chilean art. While at the beginning artists maintained a neoclassic Italian style, at the end of the fight for independence, romanticism became more popular as a technique among the patriotic and wealthy circles, which then give way to realism, a style that would prevail until 1840.

== Foreign Precursors of Chilean painting ==
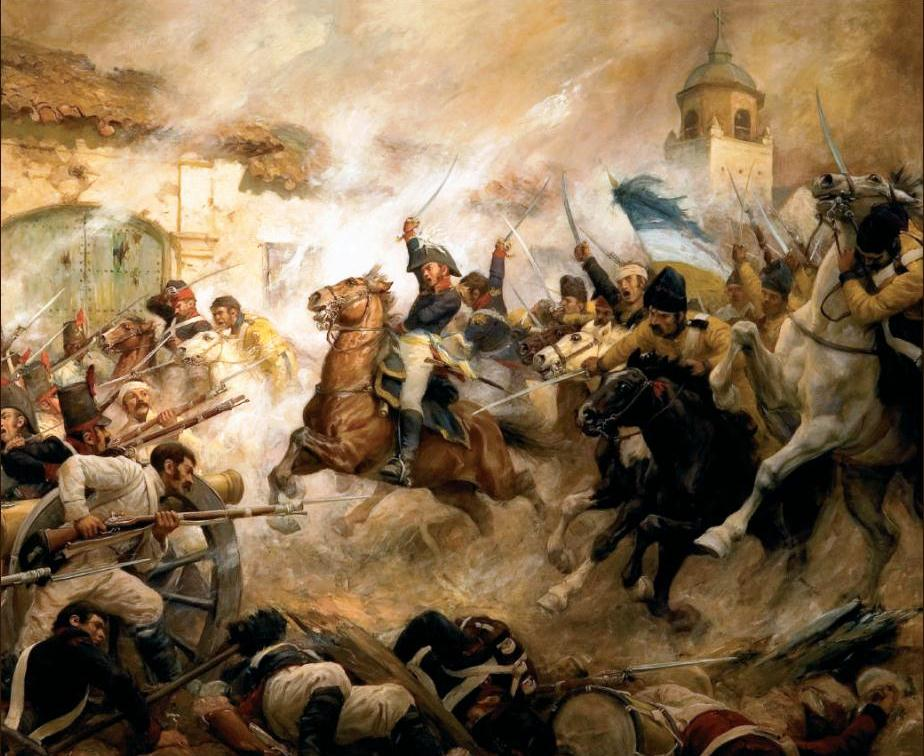
The Charge of Bernardo O'Higgins at the Battle of Rancagua, by Pedro Subercaseaux.

Among historians, it is established that the beginning of the arrival of foreign artists to Chile is marked by the arrival of the Peruvian artist José Gil de Castro. The popular painter was dedicated to painting portraits of the leaders of the revolution against the Spanish, such as Ramón Freire, Bernardo O'Higgins, Isabel Riquelme, José de San Martín and Simón Bolivar. His technique largely resembles the Cuzco School so his portrayal of faces was not particularly accurate, appearing flat and lacking in expression. Regardless of his skill as a portrait painter, the decorative details of his work are appreciated by Ricardo Bindis in his book History of Chilean Painting, who praises the way the artist treated the medals and other details present on the Caudillos and Revolution leaders’ outfits.

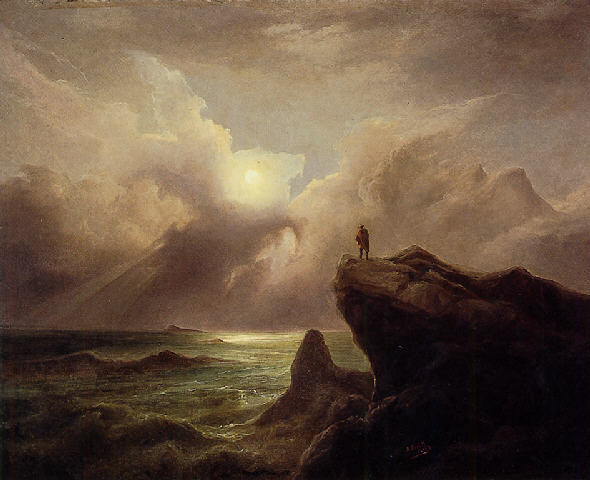
Antonio Smith, Crepúsculo marino (Ocean Twilight)

Another foreign painter of great importance to the newly formed nation was Charles Wood, an English painter who specialised in nautical scenes and contributed a large collection of paintings of remarkable historical value. Among his most famous works are Naufragio del Arethusa (Shipwreck of Arethusa) Toma de la fragata Esmeralda por la Escuadra de Chile de Lord Cochrane (The Capture of the Frigate Emerald by the Chilean Fleet of Lord Cochrane) and El General Baquedano en Campaña (General Baquedano on Campaign). According to literature, Charles Wood personally witnessed the capture of the Esmeralda frigate and he later created several reproductions of this scene. He is also credited with the design of the national coat of arms of Chile, an important contribution to the Chilean Republic.

Both the German artist Mauricio Rugendas and the French artist Ernesto Charton de Treville had an important role in portraying the typical customs of the country. Their travel through Chile produced many pictorial scenes of the birth of the newly formed republic. Among the most popular works of these artists, we find Fiesta campestre (Country Festival), La Batalla de Maipu (Battle of Maipu), and El huaso y la lavandera (Huaso and the Laundress) from Rugendas; and Plaza de Armas de Santiago (Central Square of Santiago) and La Casa de la Moneda (House of La Moneda) from Charton. Both artists are examples of travelling painters who documented what they saw.

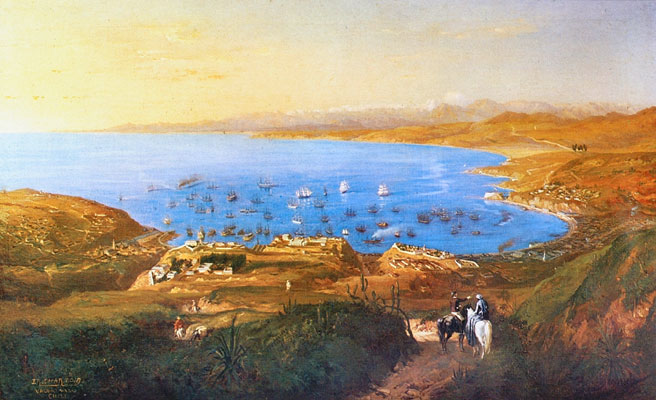
Valparaíso, by Ernesto Charton de Treville

One of the most renowned painters in Chile was French artist Raymond Monvoisin, the pioneer of the portrait in Chile. His work focused on the representation of the top aristocrats of his time, most notably Carmen Alcalde y Velasco Cazotte, General and President Manuel Bulnes, Mariano Egaña and Venezuelan politician Andrés Bello who became a Chilean national. The French artist popularised portrait painting within the Chilean elite; his direct disciples were Francisco Javier Mandiola and Jose Manuel Ramirez Rosales who inherited much of his technique and his colour schemes as well as a fascination with French culture. Mandiola, unlike Rosales and Monvoisin, preferred to portray peasants, children and homeless people, depicting the lower Chilean classes. Monvoisin was asked several times to assume the role of Director at the Academy of Fine Arts which the government looked to found but the artist had refused on several occasions previously, before Alejandro Ciccarelli finally took the position.

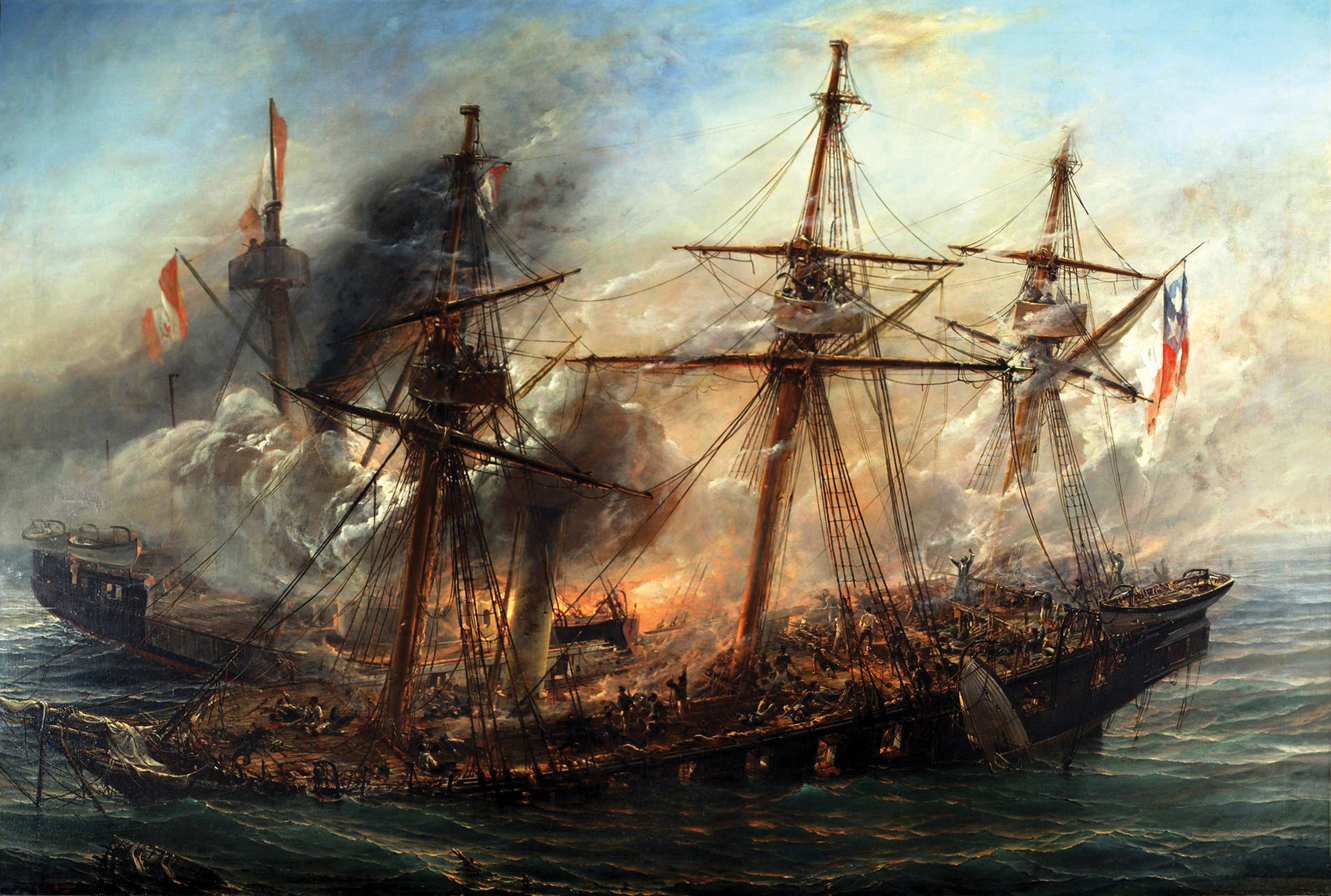
Combate Naval Iquique (The Battle of Iquique), Thomas Somerscales

Foreign Artists belonging to this group

- Claudio Gay = French botanist and naturalist, one of the first students of Chilean wildlife.
- José Gil de Castro = Transition artist whose arrival in Chile marked the beginning of the period; pioneer portraitist of America's independence heroes, such as Bernardo O'Higgins, José de San Martín and Simón Bolívar.
- Charles Thorold Wood = English documentary painter and designer of the national emblem of Chile at the time, adding the huemul and Andean condor.
- Mauricio Rugendas = German painter and illustrator, toured several Latin American countries detailing their culture and wildlife. Worked with the father of modern geography, Alexander von Humboldt.
- Raymond Monvoisin = French portrait painter, contributed to the formation of a national painting academy in Chile. Left several famous portraits in Chile including those made for Andrés Bello and Manuel Ramirez Rosales.
- Ernesto Charton de Treville = French painter whose works depict the folklore and customs of Chile.
- Otto Grashof = German painter, illustrator and portraitist.
- Thomas Somerscales = English seascape painter, famous for paintings such as The Naval Battle of Iquique.

There are also other less famous painters that are little known but belong to the same period, including: John Searle, María Graham, Johan Heinrich Jenny, Francis Martín Drexel, Camilo Domeniconi, Augusto Borget, Procesa del Carmen Sarmiento, Juan Bianchi, Clara Filleul, Alexander Simón, Giovatto Molinelli and Theodor Ohlsen.

== Chilean Precursors of Chilean painting ==
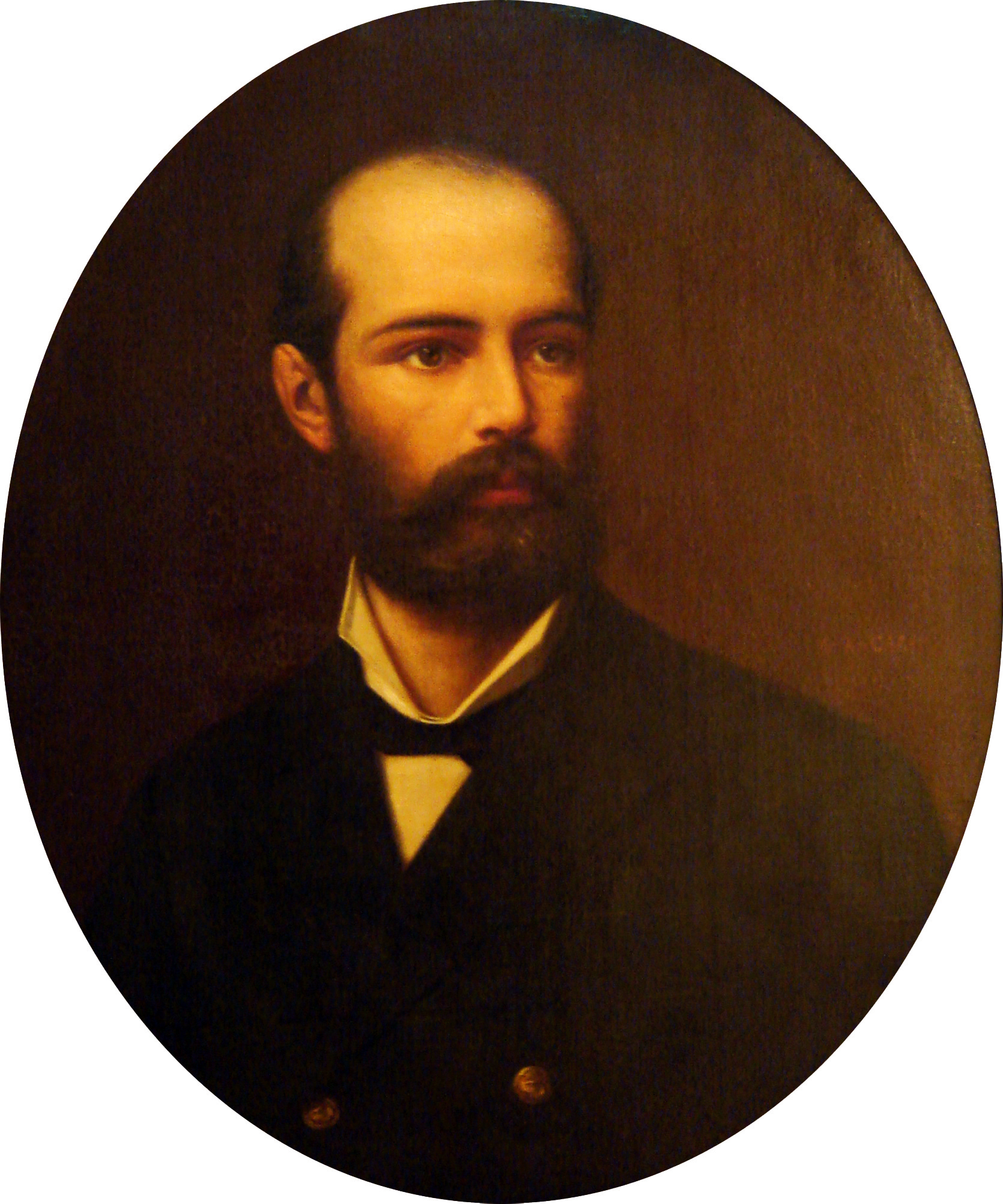
Arturo Prat, Chilean lawyer and navy officer, by Manuel Antonio Caro

The Chilean precursors of Chilean painting were, like their foreign contemporaries working in Chile, influenced by European art. The Chilean painters of this generation, like their predecessors, did not share a particular style but were active during the same period. However, they were all instrumental in introducing a new era of Chilean art with the creation of the Chilean Academy of Painting. Galaz and Ivaelic wrote that “they share the proximity of their painting with the soil, men and costumes of Chile”.

Some of the Chilean painters forming part of this movement

- Manuel Antonio Caro = Considered the most remarkable Chilean painter of this period, his style was realistic and portrayed customs and folkloric scenes. Among his most famous paintings are “La Zamacueca” and “The Abdication of O’Higgins”. Caro would also become a member of the new academy.
- Francisco Javier Mandiola= Portrayed local customs; considered the most talented pupil of Raymond Monvoisin.
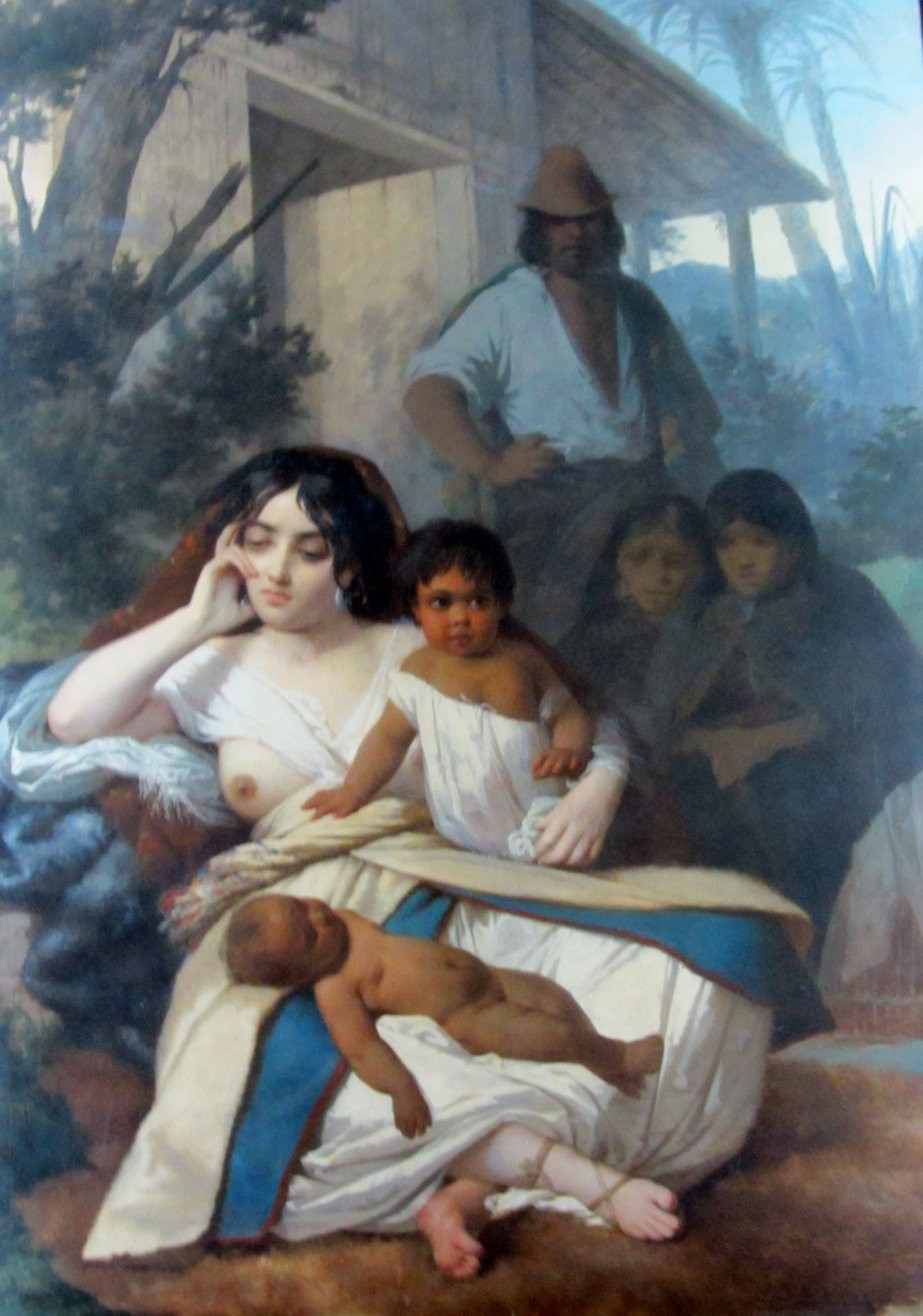
- Elisa Bravo in captivity by Raymond Monvoisin
  Vicente Pérez Rosales = Businessman and adventurer who dedicated part of his life to painting; pupil of Raymond Monvoisin.
- Antonio Gana Vargas= Born in Santiago, there is only one of his paintings still in existence, kept by the Chilean National Museum of Fine Arts.

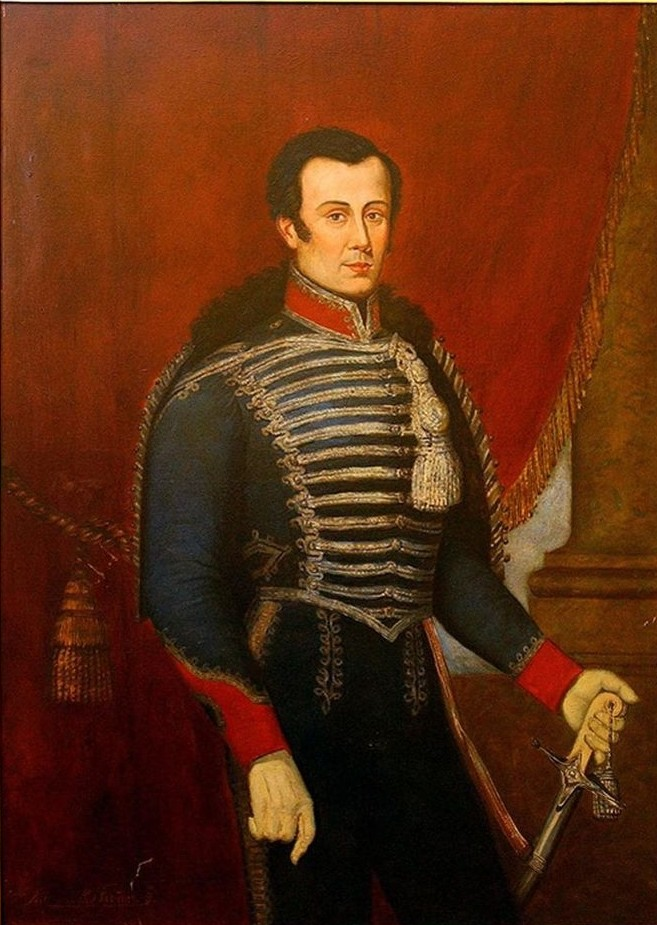
José Miguel Carrera, considered one of the founders of independent Chile, by Francisco Javier Mandiola

=== Legacy ===
During this period, the aristocracy developed a taste for fine art, leaving behind the lack of technical precision in art which had defined colonial times. The national artists still did not gain their own clear identity during this period, however, as painting remained dedicated predominantly to portraits, nature and representing the most important historical events. Historians Galaz and Ivelic wrote that while Europe discovered America during the 15th century, America did not look at Europe until the beginning of the 19th century, explaining the Americans’ fascination with European art in this period.

The end of this artistic era was marked by the founding of the new Chilean Academy of Painting in 1849, which allowed artists to study in Chile for the first time rather than having to travel to Europe. Although the Chilean Academy did not see the fruits of its labour until well into the 19th century, its importance for Chilean art become noticeable in the generation labelled by Antonio Romera as the "Generación del medio siglo" (mid-century generation).

=== Gallery ===
A selection of paintings from this period
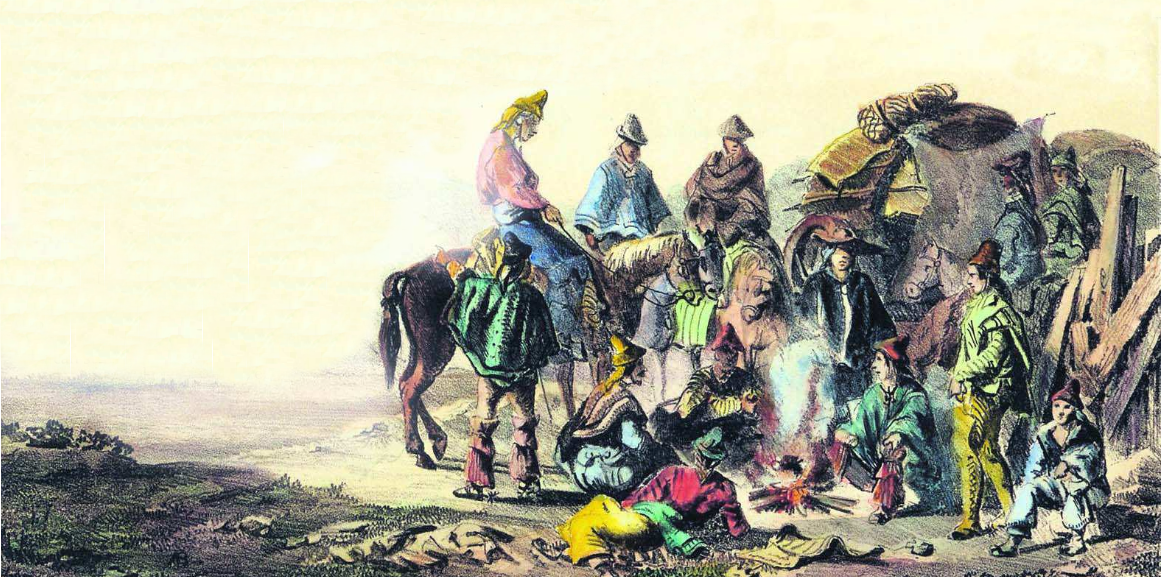
Traditional scene from the Atlas of Claude Gay

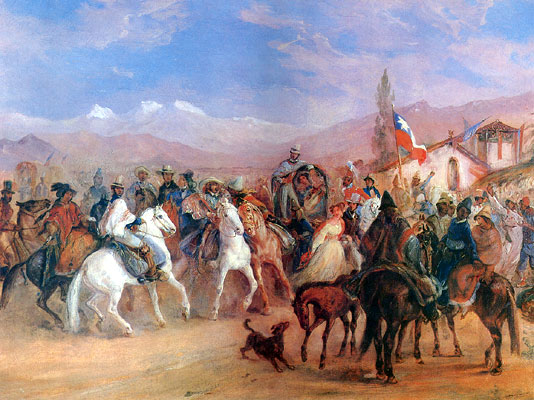
Patriotic scene by Mauricio Rugendas

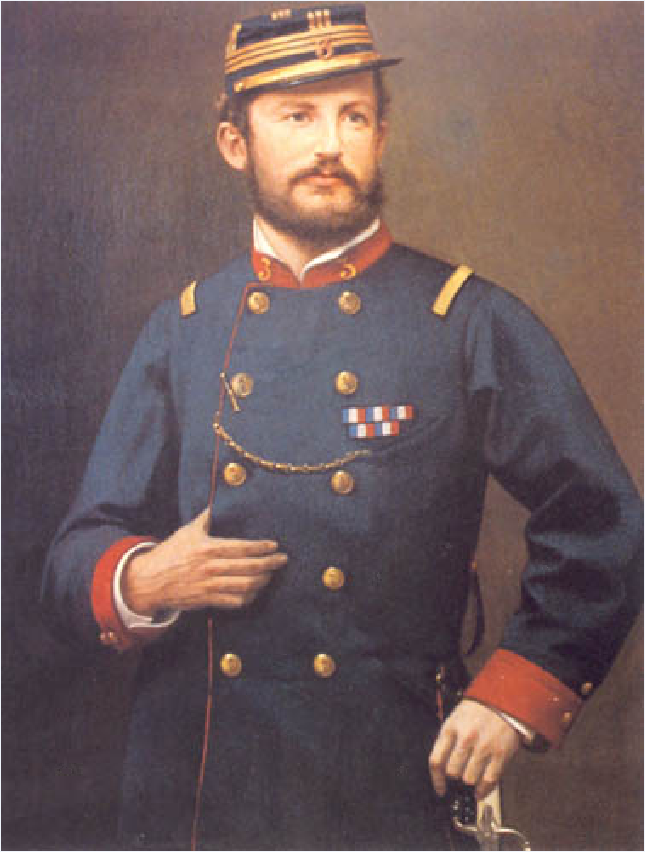
Capitán Ricardo Serrano Montaner by Manuel Antonio Caro

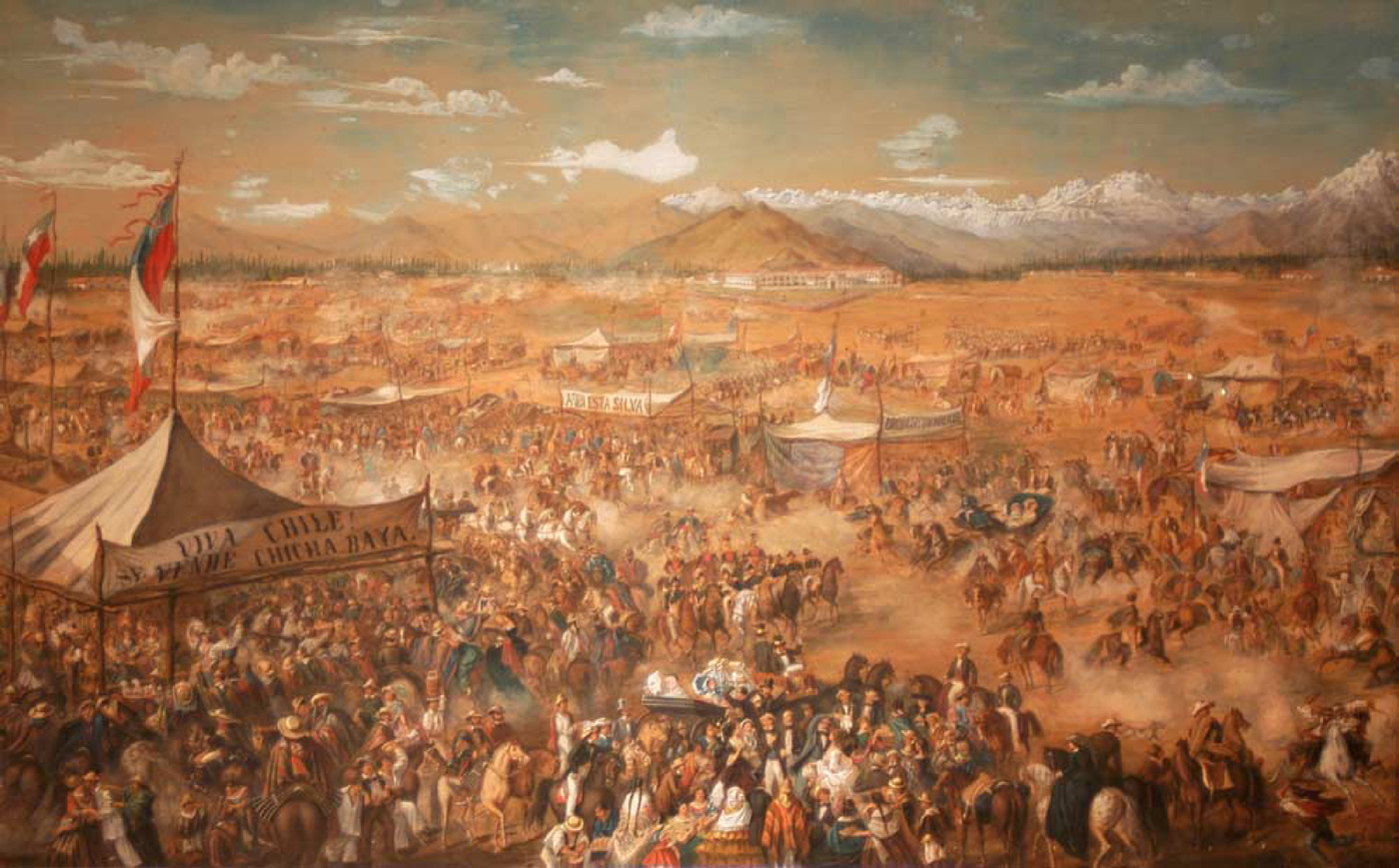
Cousiño Park, known today as O'Higgins Park, by Ernest Charton

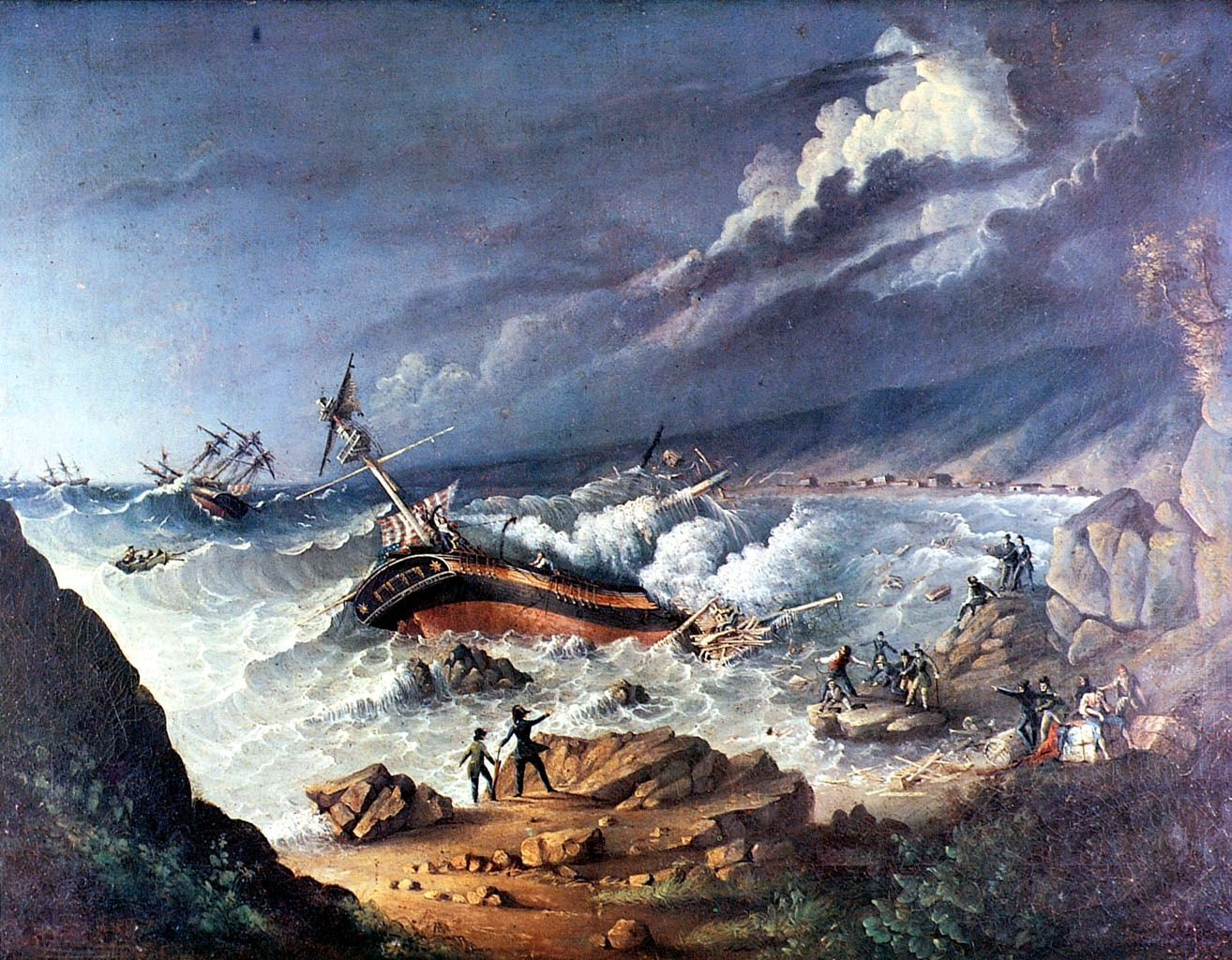
El naufragio del Arethusa (Shipwreck of the Arethusa) by Charles C. Wood Taylor

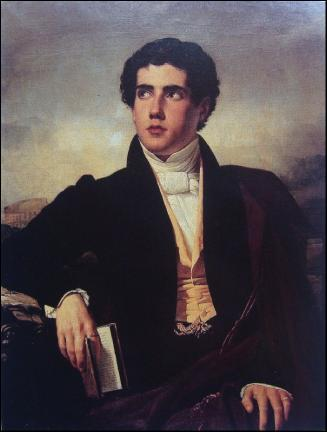
Portrait of Rosales by José Manuel Ramirez

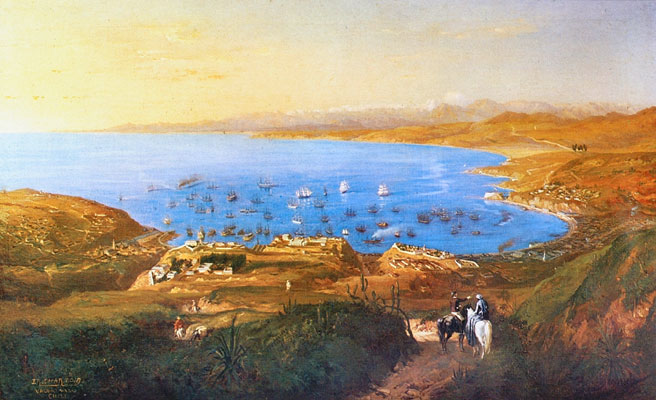
Valparaíso, by Charton de Treville

== Academy of Painting, Santiago ==
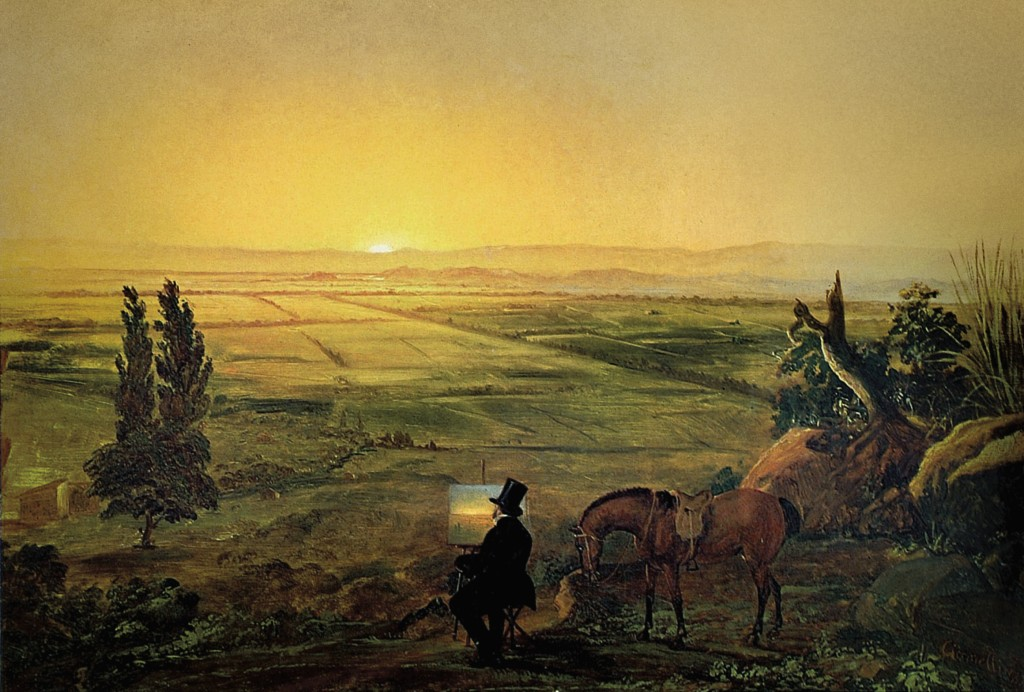
Vista de Santiago desde Peñalolén (View of Santiago from Peñalolen) by Alejandro Ciccarelli, the first director of the Chilean Academy of Painting

The Academy of Painting, Santiago was the first institution to teach art professionally in Chile. It opened on 17 March 1849 and was sponsored by the government of Manuel Bulnes as part of a state plan to promote fine art and other intellectual activities to the young Chilean population. In this period, the University of Chile (1842) was also founded along with the School of Arts and Crafts (1849), the Conservatory of Music (1850) and architecture and sculpture classes at the University of Chile, under the direction of French architect François Brunet Debaines and French sculptor Auguste François respectively. The academy was originally located in the building belonging to the San Felipe University, in what is today the Municipal Theatre of Santiago. Various changes led the academy to merge with the Museo Nacional de Bellas Artes (Chilean National Museum of Fine Arts) in 1910, and then later to hand its administration over to the University of Chile in 1932.

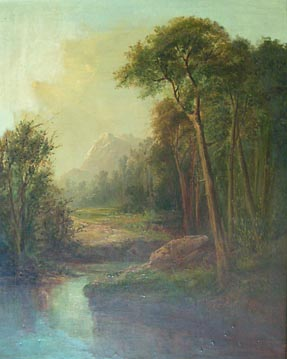
Landscape in oil by the Chilean Antonio Smith

The academy would produce the country's first national artists. It would be the starting point for some of the most prominent Chilean painters, including the four great masters of Chilean painting (Pedro Lira, Juan Francisco González, Alfredo Valenzuela Puelma and Alberto Valenzuela Llanos), their pupils, and also the future “Generación del 13” (13 Generation). The academy's first directors were the Neapolitan artist Alejandro Ciccarelli; the German artist Ernst Kirchbach; the Florentine Juan Mochi; Cosme San Martín, the first Chilean to hold this position; and the Chilean sculptor Virginio Arias.

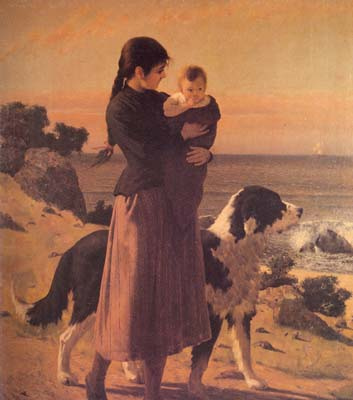
Escena de playa con figura (Beach Scene with Figure) by Pedro Lira

With the establishment of the Academy of Painting, under the direction of Ciccarelli, came the first attempt at the unification and creation of a unique national style, with the academy promoting a neoclassical style. In Europe, academies focused on uniformity, establishing fixed and strict rules to ensure “the true art” followed a straight path. The Chilean academies tried to implement this idea using French methodology. To begin with, courses consisted of three classes. The first class was “Studies of heads, extremities and the human form”, the second was “Sculpture”, and the third, “Life drawing, natural attire and anatomy”. Later, after the Academy joined forces with the National Institute, courses were extended and more teachers were taken on due to the growing number of students.

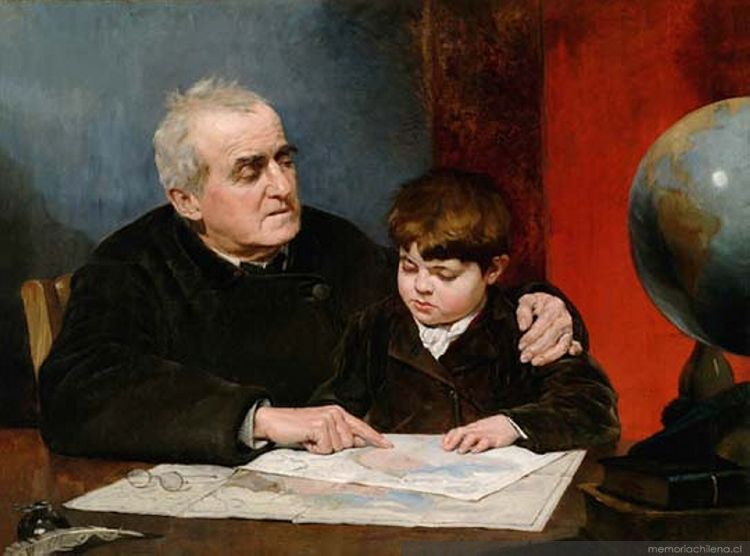
La lección de geografía (Geography lesson) by Alfredo Valenzuela Puelma

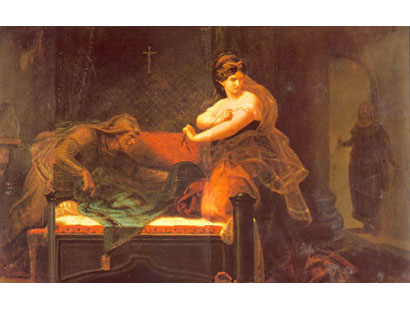
Escena Dramatica (Dramatic Scene) by Ernesto Kirchbach

=== Critics of the Academy ===
Despite the significance of the Academy, some art historians criticised this period as one of the dullest in the history of Chilean art. These authors based their criticism on Ciccarelli's attempt to copy the European model of teaching. In Europe, teachers were plentiful and the continent had vast art collections and plentiful patrons to draw upon. In contrast, Chile had only recently began its foray in the art world and was a country with almost no native art movement or established national identity, as well as a very modest national art collection, with people unable to afford fine art. The attempt to bring the European model to Chile by replicating its techniques has been seen as a failure in terms of the number of artists produced, especially for Ciccarelli, who presided over the academy for over 20 years.

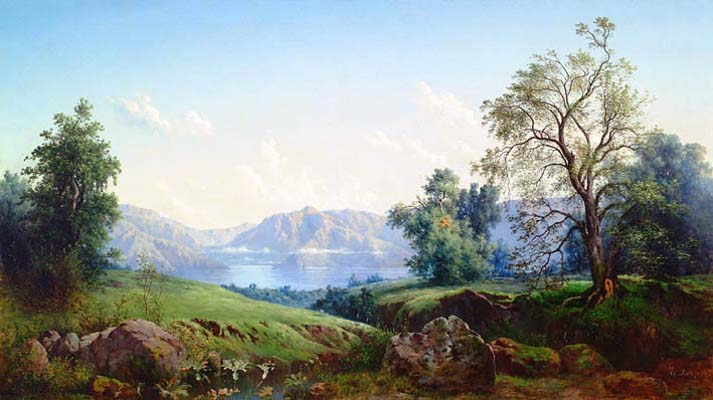
Laguna de acúleo (Acúleo Lagoon) by Onofre Jarpa

In the words of the art historian Antonio Romera, Ciccarelli was: "A dogmatic master, inflexible in defence of his aesthetic ideal, lacking the necessary ductility and eclecticism to allow students to follow their own path: that marked out by their own sensibility; by vocation; their intimate stimulation..." The same author states that Ciccarelli was unable to create the following and discipleship of his teachings that he wished for. Instead, his most successful students, such as Pedro Lira and Antonio Smith, did not care for his teachings and migrated towards other styles and workshops of their own.

Pedro Lira also agreed that with these criticisms of Ciccarelli. In the mid-19th century, the Chilean aristocrat possessed little artistic knowledge inherited from the “Precursors of Chilean painting". The complicated nature of his teaching, his over-ambitious neoclassical pretensions, and his lack of flexibility earned him criticism from several of his students, but it also created a new appetite for neoclassical painting in Chile.

=== Students of Ciccarrelli (1849–1869) ===
The outdated neoclassical style developed by Ciccarelli and imposed on his students is manifested in themes which had never been seen before in Chilean painting, like mythology, ancient history and the Classics. Some of his students resisted his teachings, the most prominent being Pedro Lira and Antonio Smith, who, independent of their studies at the academy, developed their own style and gained great recognition. The following are some of the most noteworthy of Ciccarelli's students:

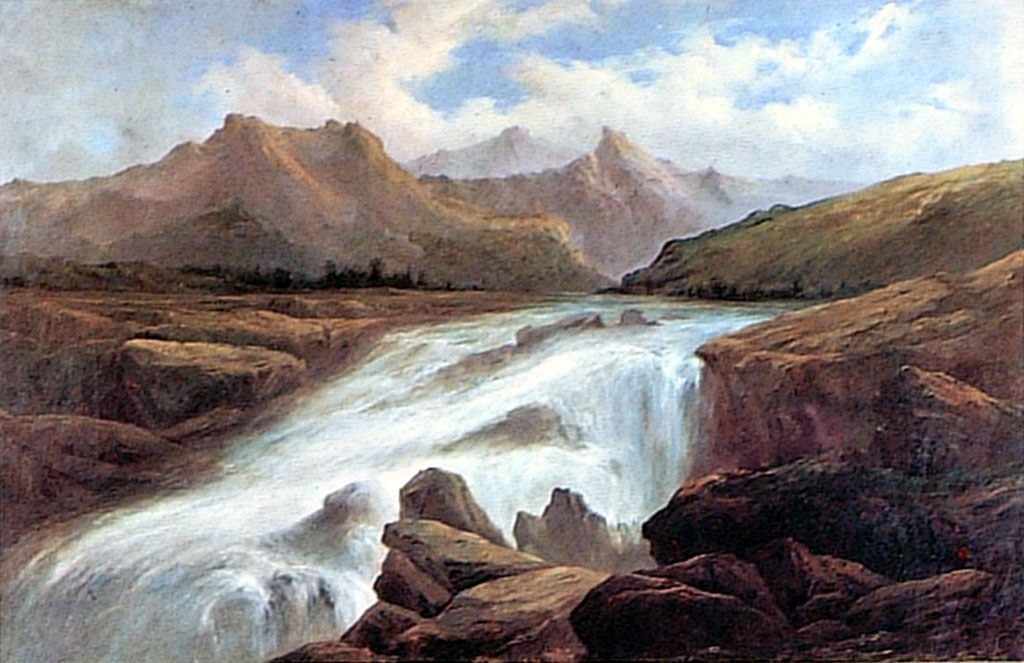
"Rio Cachapoal" (Cachapoal River), by Antonio Smith. Smith, disappointed with Ciccarelli's academic rigidity, decided to form his own art workshop to teach landscape painting. Outstanding Chilean artists like Valenzuela Puelma, Lira, Orrego Luco and Pedro León Carmona studied simultaneously with Smith and Ciccarelli, demonstrating that the Academy was not the only place able to teach art in Chile.

- Pedro Lira: Considered the natural leader of the academy by the book Chilean Painting, 200 years by Ricardo Bindis. Lira is the first and best-known of the four great masters of Chilean painting. Historians like Romera consider him part of the "mid-century generation."
- Antonio Smith: Romantic painter, creator of the national landscape school and the first Chilean cartoonist. Also worked on the Correo literario (Literature Mail magazine). One of the harshest critics of Ciccarelli.
- Manuel Antonio Caro: Painter of historical customs and traditions and part of the “precursors of Chilean painting” group. Painter of The Abdication of O'Higgins and Zamacueca.
- Pascual Ortega Portales: Painter. His art is originality, romanticism and realism.
- Onofre Jarpa Labra: Romantic landscape painter.
- Cosme San Martín: outstanding artist; would become the first Chilean director of the Chilean Academy.
- Abraham Zañartu: Generre painter and portraitist.
- Miguel Campos: Outstanding student of the Academy with a distinguished career as an illustrator in Paris.

In 1859, under the direction of Ciccarelli, the Academy became the School of Fine Arts at the University of Chile, merging with the architecture and sculpture classes already on offer there. During the same year, a new government decree reorganised and divided the sculpture course into two different sections, statues and monuments. In 1869, after 20 years, the Italian finally left his position, leaving the door open for the German Ernesto Kirchbach. Kirchbach imposed a very strict academic teaching style and a new style for his pupils - romanticism.

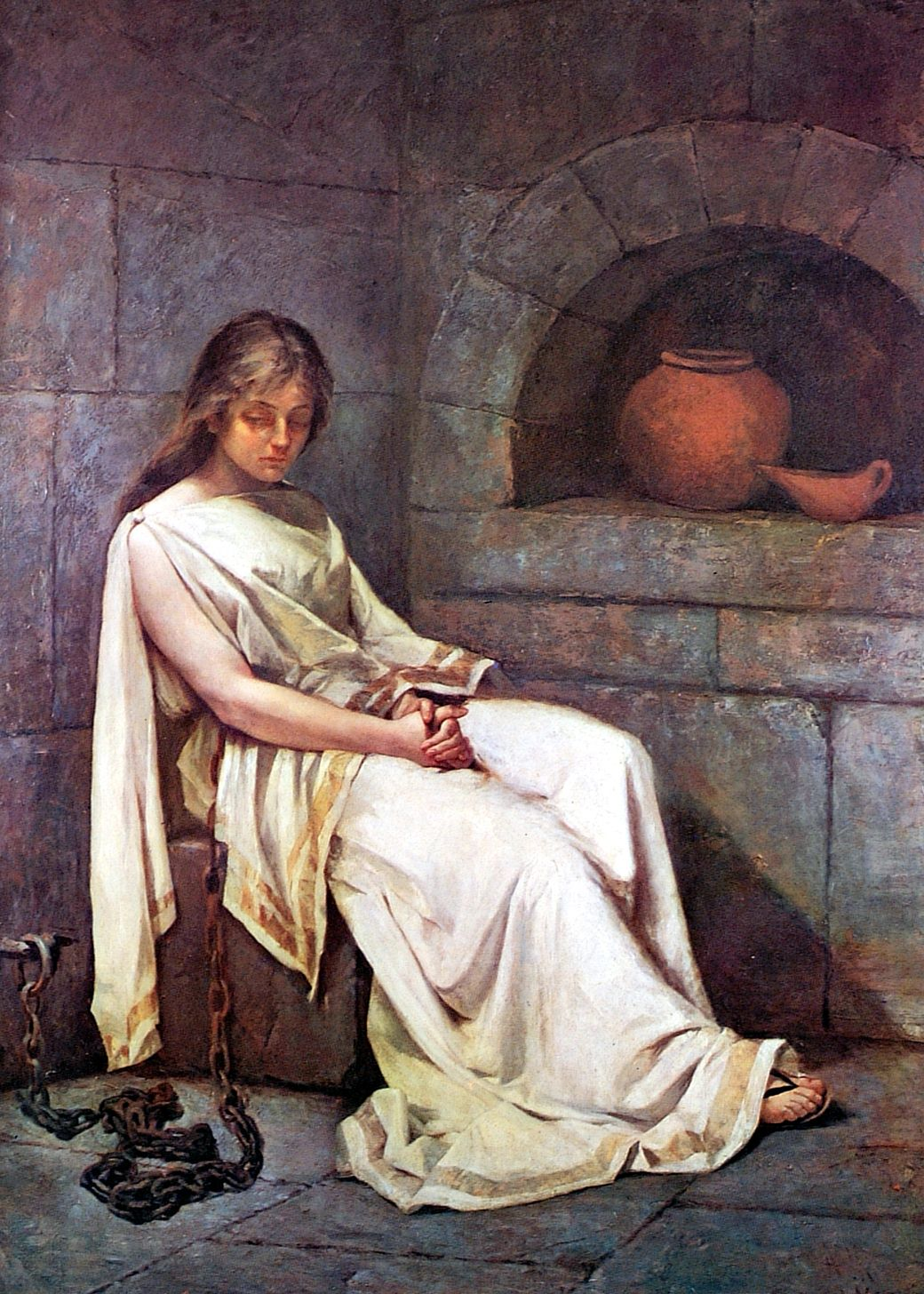
Agrippina Metella chained, oil on canvas, 200 x 143 cm, Banco Chile, Chile

=== Legacy ===
During this period, everything that had given Chilean art its identity before the establishment of the Academy - pre-Columbian art; the educational and socially unifying efforts of colonial art; and the eclecticism of the period of the travelling artists - was lost.

The academy, and therefore painting and sculpture, became a privilege for the upper classes, with pictures that could only be understood by having already seen the work of the European masters.

For historians, this meant that while the early years of the academy saw the first effort made in Chile to improve the quality of the arts, they were also a springboard for several independent artists who tired of academic dogmatism and started to look elsewhere for new styles, techniques and inspiration.

The Academy left a legacy of students who awoke in society an intellectual interest in Chilean art, with groups like "The 13 Generation" and "The Great Chilean Masters" formed mostly by Academy students. Many of the works produced at the academy are now in the hands of private collectors, but are also displayed in Chilean museums and public spaces throughout the country.

== The Great Chilean Masters ==
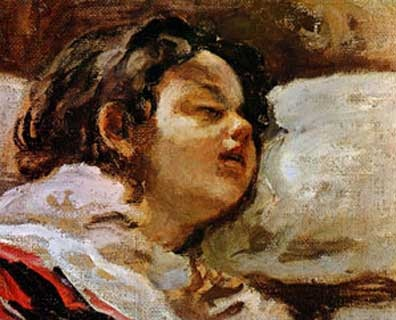
El Niño Dormido (The Sleeping Child) by Juan Francisco González

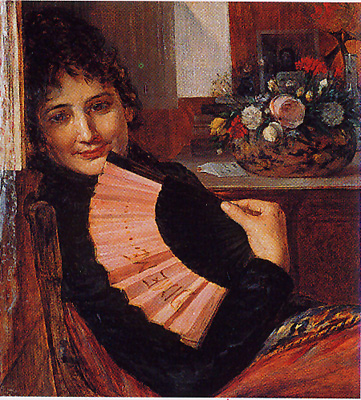
Coquetería (Coquetry) by Alfredo Valenzuela Puelma

The art historian Antonio Romera highlights the four most prominent and important painters in the development of Chilean art in the late 19th and early 20th centuries:

- Alfredo Valenzuela Puelma
- Pedro Lira Rencoret
- Alberto Valenzuela Llanos
- Juan Francisco González

First generation students of the Academy, the four refined their artistic technique in France and took on the role of ‘master’ for other art students. At some point they all moved away from the academy in order to adopt new trends. Despite having deep aesthetic and stylistic differences, they were contemporaries of one another and would have known each other.

While the work of Alfredo Valenzuela Puelma and Pedro Lira can be classified as naturalist, Alberto Valenzuela Llanos and Juan Francisco González adopted new modern trends. Some historians, such as Gaspar and Ivelic, also chose to add the artist Alfredo Helsby to the list of the Masters, but there is no absolute consensus on this.

The Great Masters of Chilean painting
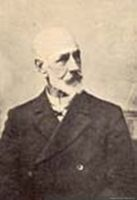
Pedro Francisco Lira Rencoret

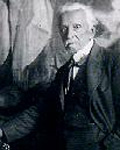
Juan Francisco González

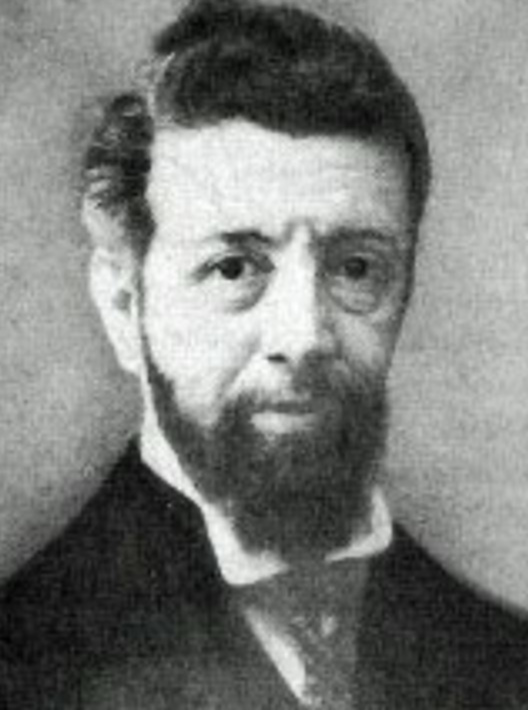
Alfredo Valenzuela Puelma

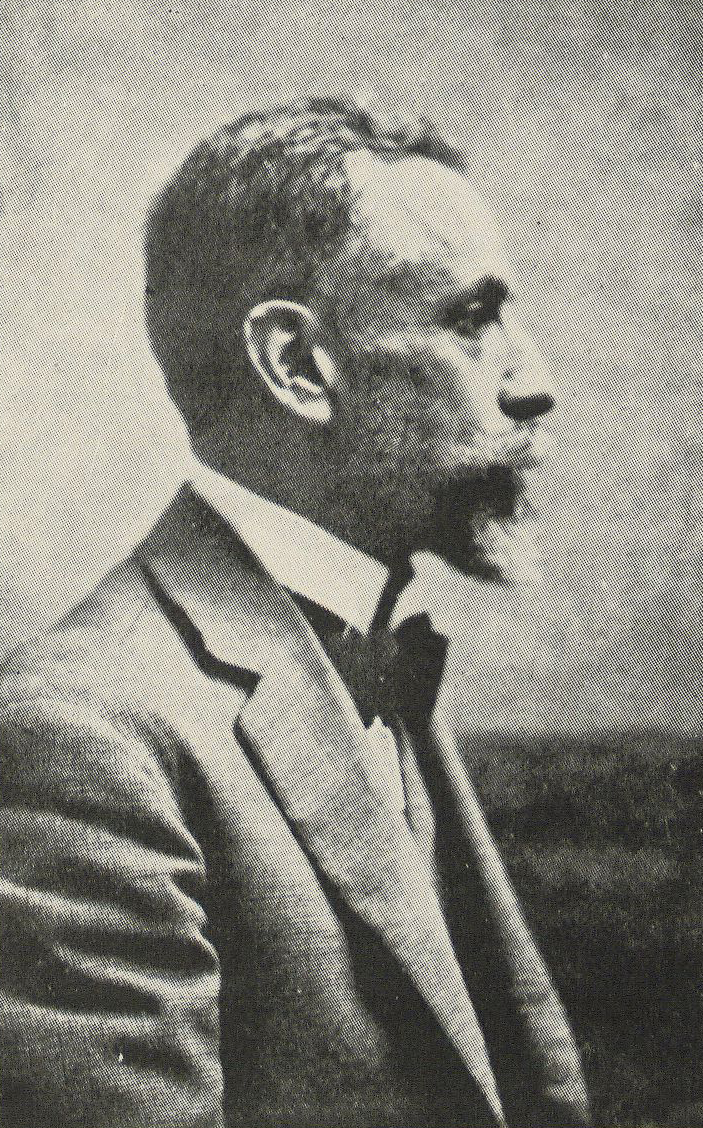
Alberto Valenzuela Llanos

== The 13 Generation ==
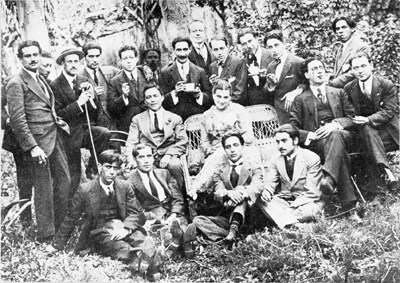
Members of The 13 Generation. From left to right, standing: Exequiel Plaza, Claudio de Alas, Tony Rogers (theatre operator), Alberto Lobos, Alberto Romero, Pedro Luna, José Backhaus, Lautaro García, Julio Ortiz de Zárate, Camilo Mori and Alfredo Lobos. Sitting in the middle: Julio Vásquez Cortés, Carmen Tórtola Valencia, Carlos Predes Saldías and Luis Johnson. Sitting on the floor: Enrique Lobos, Manuel Gallinato, Fernando Meza and Julio Walton.

The 13 Generation was Chile's first true artistic group or movement. They got their name from a joint exhibition held in 1913 in the offices of the Chilean newspaper El Mercurio. The group was characterised by a fascination with pre-Columbian art and customs, social critique and the portrayal of a group of people never seen before in Chilean painting: the working class. As with the founders of Romanticism, they were bohemian but engaged in work of a more social nature. With most of them coming from humble beginnings, they made little money from painting and mostly lived in poverty, causing many to die young from diseases such as malaria and tuberculosis.

The 13 Generation emerged from the country's poorest neighbourhoods. Initially, its members studied with Pedro Lira and were influenced by the Spaniard Álvarez de Sotomayor, who, in turn, inherited a similar style to Velázquez.

This group is also known as the “Centenary Generation” or “Centenary Group” because some of its members unveiled their paintings at the International Exposition of 1910. They were also sometimes called “The Tragic Generation” because of the bohemian and miserable life that led many to a very early grave. Pablo Neruda called them a “heroic captaincy of painters” in recognition of the effort to portray the life of the working classes and the customs of the Mapuche people.

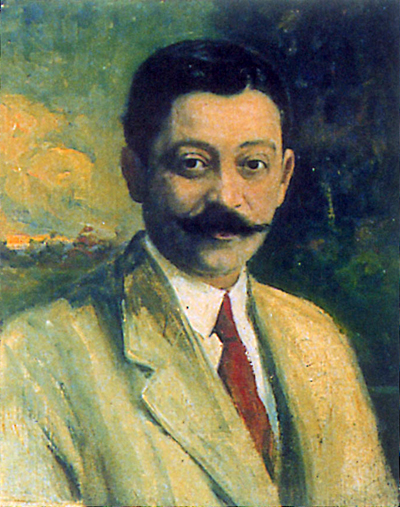
Fernando Álvarez de Sotomayor

=== Notable members of this group ===
Although there is not an exhaustive list of the 13 Generation, several authors have noted that the most representative were:

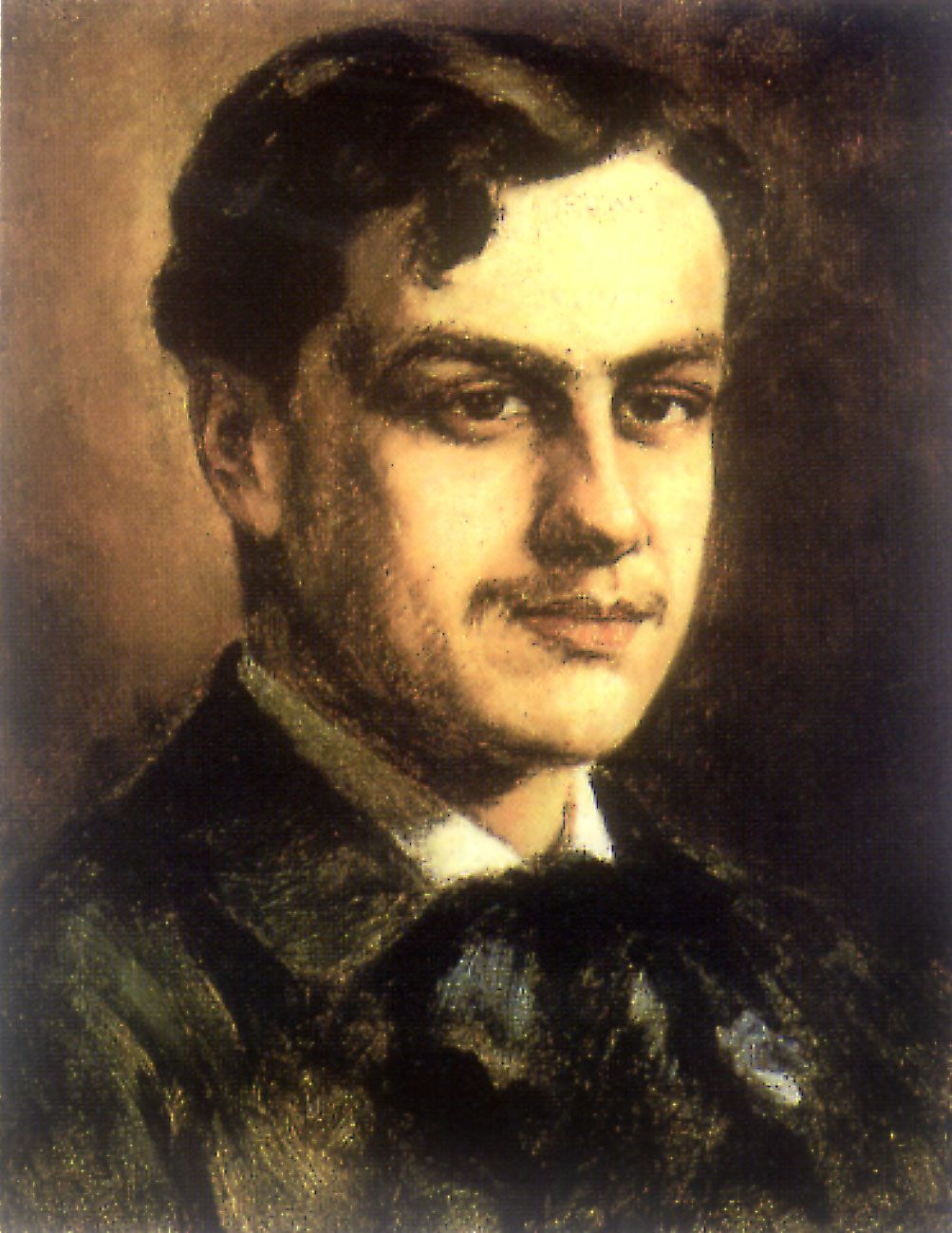
Portrait of Augusto d'Halmar by Juan Francisco González

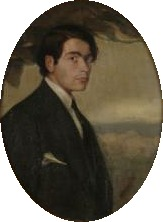
Alberto Lobos, Self-portrait

- Agustín Abarca (1882–1953):
- Francisco Alcalde (1885–1946)
- Judith Alpi (1893–1938):
- Gilberto Avendaño (1891–1964):
- Enrique Bertrix (1895–1915):
- Albelardo Bustamante (1888–1934):
- Jerónimo Costa (1880–1967):
- Manuel Gallinato:
- Otto Georgi (1890–1969):
- Ricardo Gilbert:
- Arturo Gordon (1883–1944):
- Carlos Isamitt (1887–1974):
- Humberto Izquierdo
- The Lobos brothers:
  - Enrique Lobos (1887–1918):
  - Alfredo Lobos (1890–1927):
  - Alberto Lobos (1892–1925):
- Pedro Luna (1892–1956):
- Andrés Madariaga (1879–1920):
- Fernando Meza (1890–1929):
- Elmina Moisan (1897–1938):
- Enrique Moya (1892–1918):
- Ezequiel Plaza (1892–1947):
- José Pridas y Solares (1889 -?):
- Jaime Torrent (1893–1925):
- Ulises Vásquez (1892–1942).

Lesser known members of the group

- Carlos Ludstedt
- Óscar Millán
- Estela Ross Mujica
- Guillermo Vergara

=== Gallery ===
Some 13 Generation paintings
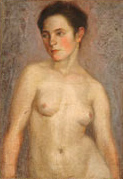
Desnudo (nude) by Abelardo “Pashin” Bustamante.

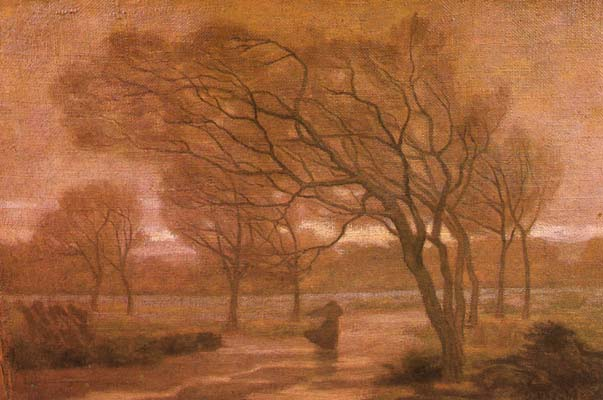
Viento puelche (Puelche (wind)) by Ulises Vásquez.

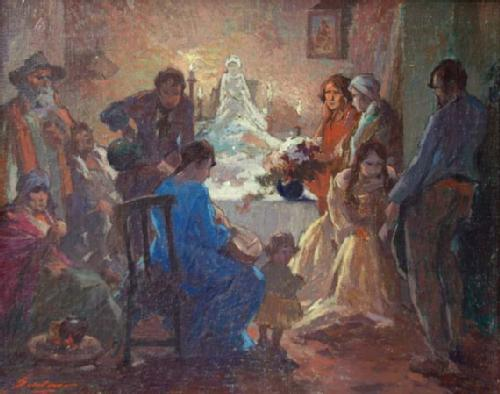
Velorio de un angelito (Funeral of a Little Angel) by Arturo Gordon.

== The Montparnasse Group ==
The Montparnasse Group was a Chilean art collective, formed in 1922 by artists strongly influenced by the European trends of Post-Impressionism, especially the works of Paul Cézanne, and Fauvism.

The group took their name from a visit to France, where they stayed in the Parisian neighbourhood of Montparnasse, a social hub for the art avant-garde. During this visit, they met the Spanish artist Juan Gris (José Victoriano González-Pérez) and took part in the Salon d'Automne in 1920.

Apart from Post-Impressionism and Fauvism trends, the group were also influenced by other styles such as expressionism and cubism, but these had a lesser effect on their style. The group expressed their opposition to academic art and romantic Criollismo imposed in Chile at that time.

=== Notable members of this group ===
- Pablo Burchard (1875–1964)
- Jorge Caballero (1902–1992)
- Isaías Cabezón (1891–1963)
- Hector Cáceres (1897–1980)
- Ana Cortés (1906–1998)
- Augusto Eguiluz (1893–1969)
- Jorge Letelier (1887–1966)
- Camilo Mori (1896–1973)
- Julio Ortiz de Zárate Pinto (1885–1943)
- Manuel Ortiz de Zárate Pinto (1887–1946)
- Henriette Petit (1894–1983)
- José Perotti (1898–1956)
- Inés Puyó (1906–1996)
- Luis Vargas Rosas (1897–1977)
- Pablo Vidor (1892–1991)
- Waldo Vila (1894–1979)
- Marta Villanueva (1900–1995)
- Álvaro Yáñez Bianchi "Juan Emar" (1893–1964)

== The 40 Generation ==
The group of artists who graduated in 1940 became known by this name after the exhibition at the Salón oficial (The Official Salon) in 1941. The exhibition was a contest organised by the executive committee of the Museum of Fine Arts, and was open to both Chilean and foreign artists, as long as their pieces were created in Chile. This contest began on 15 November each year during the Chilean spring.

The group is characterised by their affinity with Impressionism and Fauvism, and their command of drawing and harmonious composition. They are also known for remaining disassociated from the political agitation affecting the country during this period and instead focusing exclusively on art.

Members of this generation included: Augusto Barcia, Ana Cortés, Ximena Cristi, Manuel Gómez Hassan, Sergio Montecino, Fernando Morales Jordán, Eduardo Ossandón, Francisco Otta, Arturo Pacheco Altamirano, Carlos Pedraza Olguín, Tole Peralta, Maruja Pinedo, Aída Poblete, Inés Puyó, Israel Roa, Reinaldo Villaseñor and Hardy Wistuba.

== Grupo Signo (Sign Group) ==
This group was formed by Alberto Pérez, Gracia Barrios, José Balmes and Eduardo Martínez Bonati with the motto “create a casual and instinctive art”. They introduced a new form of art which focused on achieving a new visual style, giving importance to the artistic materials themselves, disregarding the representation and portrayal of subjects, and expanding the concept of painting. This resulted in the abandonment of the traditional easel painting. The four artists were selected, along with Patricio Valenzuela and Carlos Ortúzar, to participate in the Second Youth Biennial of Paris in 1961, and they consolidated as a group in 1962, when they took part in the Darro Gallery exhibition in Madrid under the name “Sign Group”.

== Escena de avanzada (Vanguard Scene) ==
This name was given by the art critic and theorist Nelly Richard to a diverse group of artists from various disciplines, whose main characteristic and aim was to modify the artistic dialogue of Chile. This scene, or movement, produced artists who, from 1977 to 1982, were against the institutions imposed by the military government at the time.

They shared a desire to create new visual languages (as had the Sign Group) under the tenets of conceptual art and a questioning attitude to the media and to other contemporary groups. Artists forming part of the Vanguard Scene included: Carlos Altamirano, Juan Castillo, Eugenio Dittborn, Diamela Eltit, Carlos Gallardo, Carlos Leppe, Gonzalo Mezza, Ximena Prieto, Lotty Rosenfeld, Francisco Smythe and the poet Raúl Zurita.

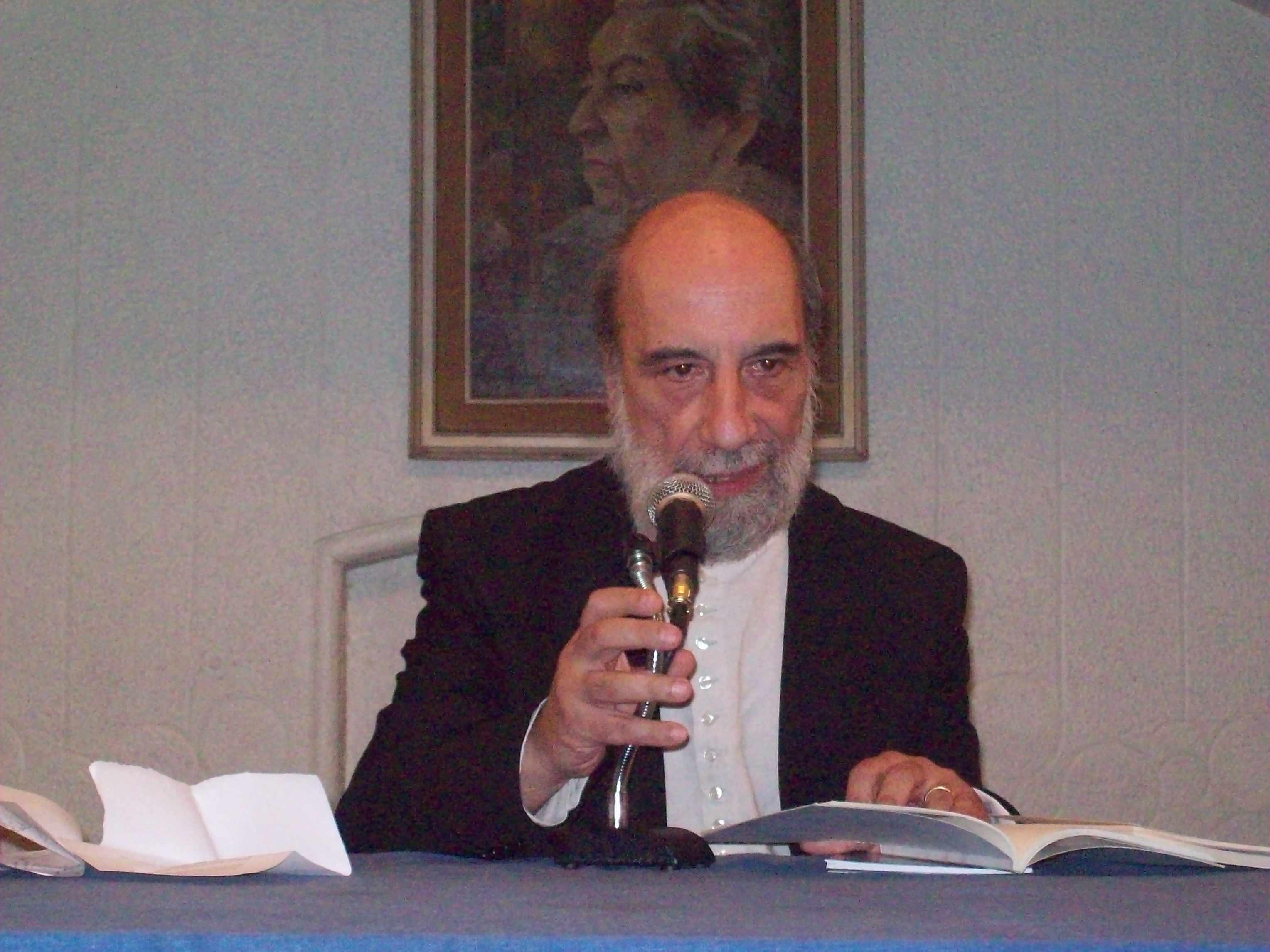
Raúl Zurita

== CADA Group ==
CADA, is an acronym which stands for Colectivo Acción de Arte (Collective Art Action). They made bold public interventions in the late 70s and early 80s. The group was formed by the writer Diamela Eltit, the poet Raúl Zurita, the sociologist Fernando Balcells and the visual artists Lotty Rosenfeld and Juan Castillo and reacted artistically to the institutions of the time. According to the American critic Robert Neustatt, CADA represented the political opposition of the time and became critics of the media.

== Promoción 80 (80s Prom) ==
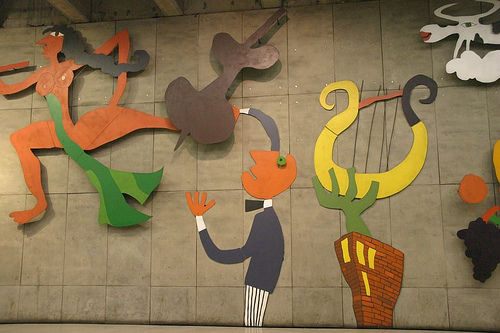
Declaracion de Amor (Declaration of Love)

Promoción 80, or Eighties Prom, was a group of artists from varied backgrounds and schools whose work was introduced onto the national scene during the 1980s. It was characterised by the search for new artistic languages and was linked with the German neo-expressionist trend.

The group mainly included students who graduated from the University of Chile’s School of Art in 1979. They held a joint exhibition at the Museum of Contemporary Art in 1980, entitled Promotion 80, under the curatorship of Milan Ivelic. The following artists took part in the exposition: Jorge Tacla, Samy Benmayor, Omar Gatica, Ismael Frigerio, Rodrigo Pascal, Victoria Calleja, Mamy Ussui and Álvaro Cortés.

Other artists considered exponents of this generation are: Patricia Figueroa, Carlos Maturana (Bororo), Carlos Bogni and Eva Lefever. There were also other artists who were not from the University of Chile’s School of Art - like the self-taught Pablo Domínguez and Gonzalo Ilabaca, the sculptor and architect Ivan Daiber, and the painter Ignacio Valdés from Catholic University of Santiago - who were also considered members of this group.

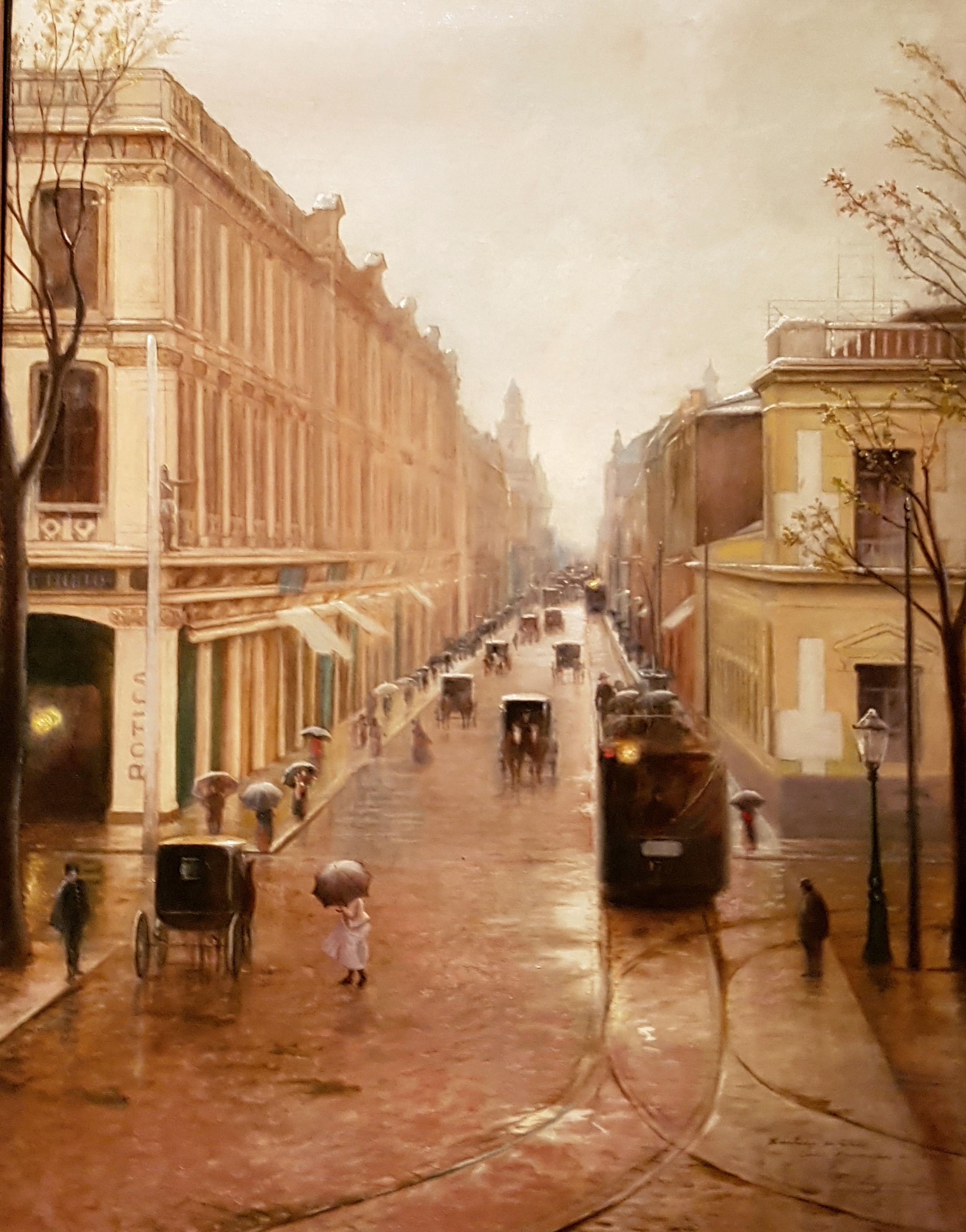
Calle Ahumada in 1902 by Enrique Lynch del Solar (1902)

== The 90s ==
Unlike their predecessors, the artists of this decade seemed to lack identity, or at least a common identity. There is no unifying element such as an aesthetic or political orientation that brings them together under one theme.

Their works can be classified as Neo-pop, realistic, abstract, landscape, ethnic and graphic, capturing multiple, loosely connected themes.

In 2004, an exhibition called The Lost Generation: Decade of the 90s brought together some of the artists that represented the decade. The exhibition was organized by the painter Jorge Gonzales Lohse and was held in a shopping mall in the south of Santiago. Gonzales Lohse, who also curated the exhibition, highlighted three main reasons for the diverse or eclectic identity of Chilean art in the 90s: the return to democracy; the emerging art market; and the opening of new art schools in recently created universities. "The 90s saw the emergence of an art with a commercial purpose within a highly structured system," Gonzalez Lohse is quoted as saying in the PortaldeArte.cl.

== Chilean Surrealism ==
Roberto Matta is one of Chile's best-known painters, met with international recognition, Matta turned the spotlight to the upcoming Chilean Surrealism. Gonzalo Cienfuegos, Aldo Alcota, and Roberto Yáñez presented the best surrealist works made in Chile at the 2005 "Derrame Cono Sur o el viaje de los argonautas" exposition which included works of surrealist from Argentina and Brazil.

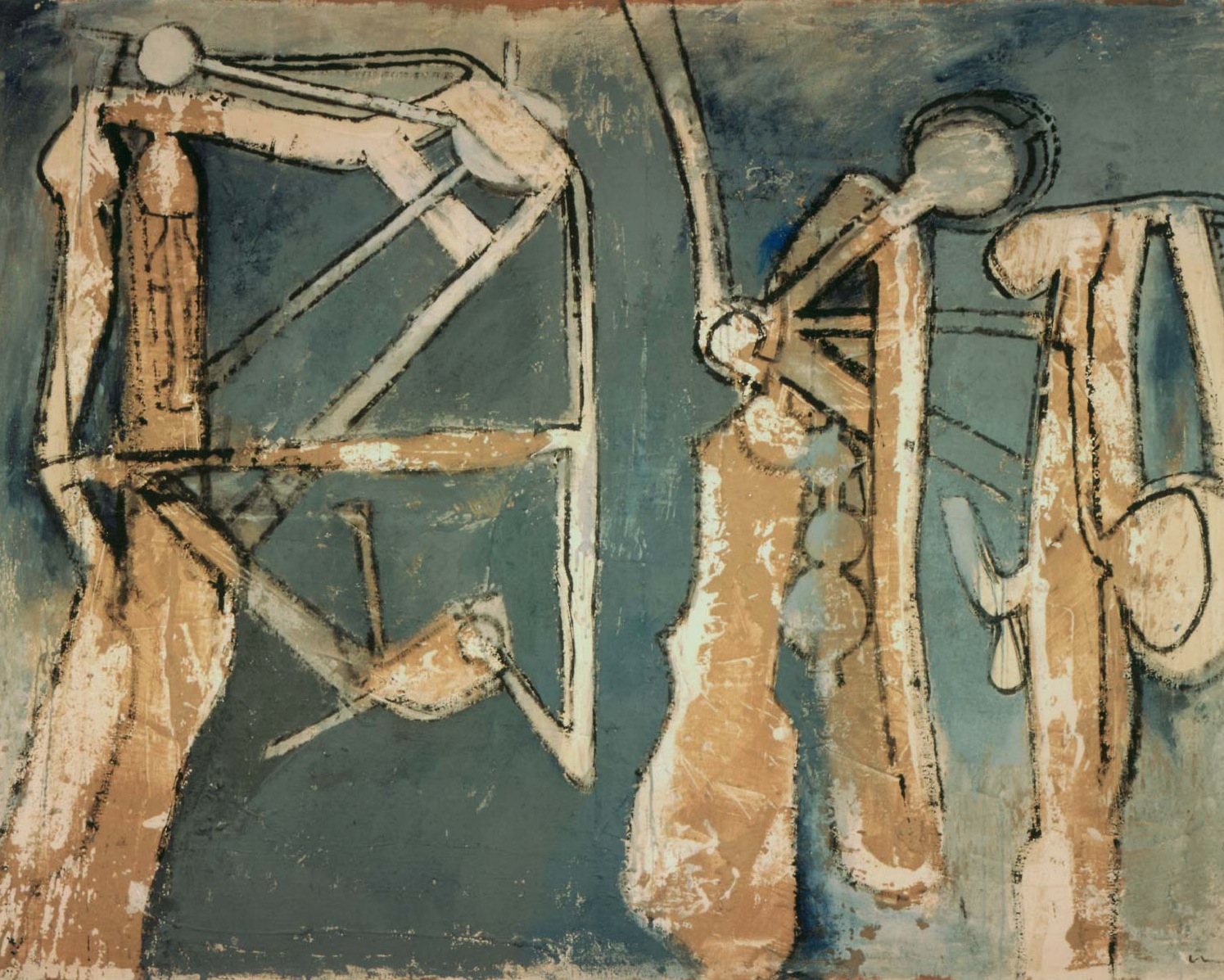
Three Figures 1958

== Bibliography ==
- ÁLVAREZ URQUIETA, LUIS.
  - La pintura en Chile : colección Luis Alvarez Urquieta, 1928 Text in Spanish
  - La pintura en Chile durante el período Colonial, 1933. Text in Spanish
  - El artista pintor José Gil de Castro, 1934. Text In Spanish
- ROMERA R., ANTONIO, Historia de la pintura chilena, 1951. Text In Spanish
- GALAZ, GASPAR AND MILÁN IVELIC, La pintura en Chile : desde la Colonia hasta 1981, 1981 Text in Spanish

== See also ==
- List of Chilean artists
- Latin American art
- Arpilleras

=== External links ===
- (Memoria Chilena) Digital library of Chile
- Database of Chilean visual artists
