= Augusto Barcia =

Chilean painter and professor (1926–2001)

- Born: Augusto Barcia Muñoz; 20 August 1926; Santiago, Chile
- Died: 8 December 2001 (aged 75); Santiago, Chile
- Education: University of Chile
- Movement: Expressionism
- Website: barcia.cl

Augusto Barcia Muñoz (20 August 1926 – 8 December 2001) was a Chilean painter and professor. A representative of the Chilean Generation of '40 (Spanish: Generación del Cuarenta), Barcia is considered one of the first expressionist painters in Chile.

== Biography ==
Barcia was born on 20 August 1926 in Santiago.

In 1943, Barcia enrolled at the Arts Faculty of the University of Chile. Specializing in painting, Barcia studied under Augusto Eguiluz, Pablo Burchard, and Gregorio de la Fuente. Until 1987, Barcia was a professor of painting and drawing at the Arts Faculty of the University of Chile. Barcia also served as director of the Association of Painters and Sculptors of Chile.

Barcia's early work focused on portraiture. Barcia later moved towards landscape painting in an expressionist style, being one of the first to paint in the style in Chile.

Barcia was a member of the Mural Workshops of 1969–1973 at the Pontifical Catholic University of Valparaíso led by Francisco Méndez. In 1991, following the Chilean transition to democracy, Barcia joined Méndez's revived Mural Workshop.

On 8 December 2001 Barcia died in Santiago, aged 75.
