= Hermógenes Pérez de Arce Ibieta =

Chilean journalist

Hermógenes Pérez de Arce
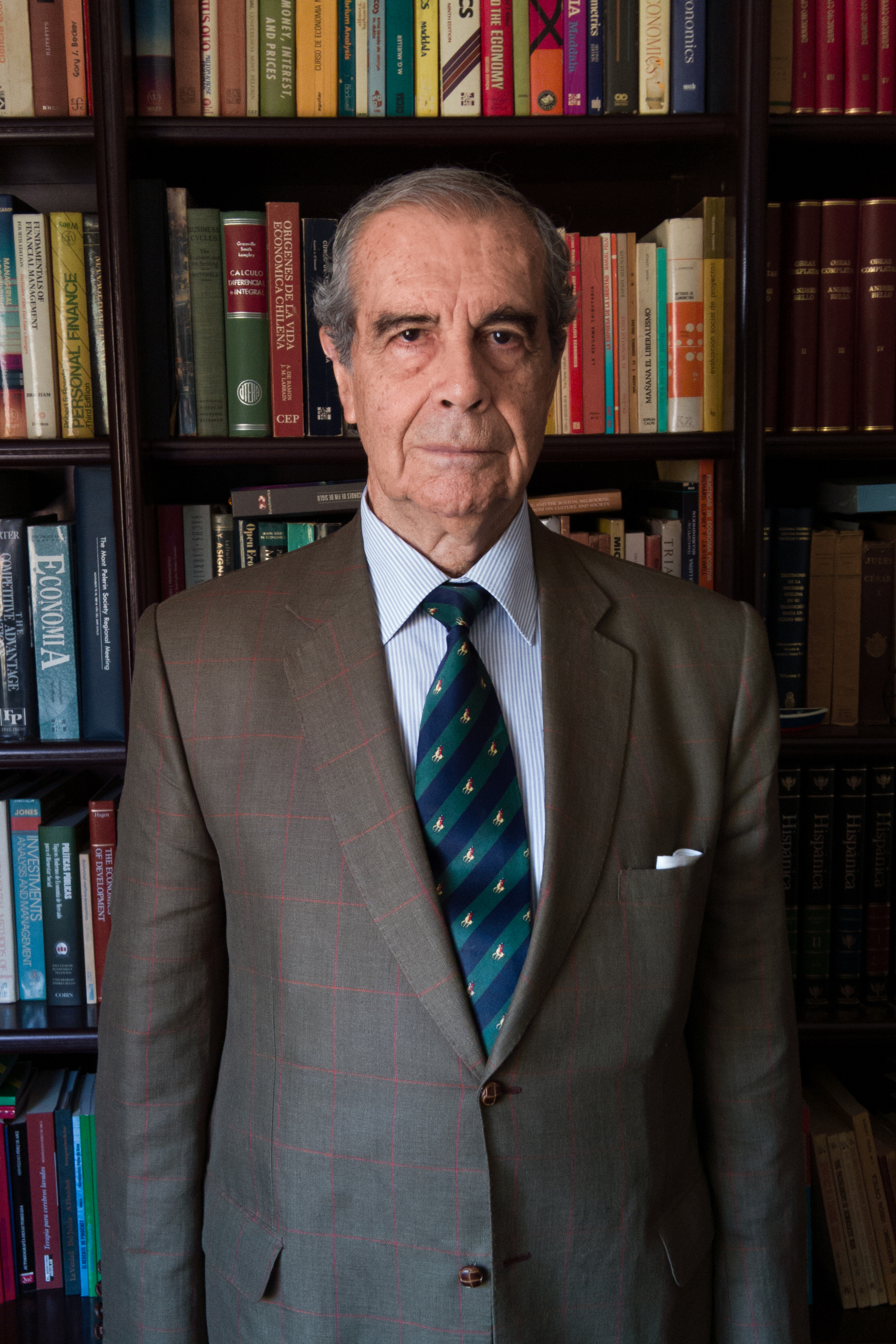
- Official portrait (2018)

Member of the Chamber of Deputies
- In office 15 May 1973 – 21 September 1973
- Preceded by: Gustavo Monckeberg Barros
- Succeeded by: Dissolution of the position (After the 1973 coup d'état)

Personal details
- Born: 10 January 1936 (age 90) Santiago, Chile
- Party: National Party (1983–1987); National Force (2019–2021); National Libertarian Party (2025–)
- Spouse: María Soledad Vial Valdés
- Children: Four
- Parent(s): Jorge Pérez de Arce Plummer; María Ibieta Egaña
- Relatives: Hermógenes Pérez de Arce Lopetegui (great-grandfather); Guillermo Pérez de Arce (uncle)
- Education: Universidad de Chile (LL.B)
- Occupation: Politician
- Profession: Lawyer

Hermógenes Pérez de Arce Ibieta (born 10 January 1936) is a Chilean lawyer and politician who served as deputy during Salvador Allende's government. He is commonly known in Chile for his continued supper of Augusto Pinochet's 1973 coup and dictatorship. He has been considered a leading denialist or rehabilitate it, at one time denying that there were ‘systematic human rights violations’ under it (see the human rights violations in Pinochet's Chile).

For long time Hermógenes Pérez de Arce was a regular columnist in El Mercurio. Prior to that, he was active in Portada, a magazine with conservative, Catholic and Francoist leanings. He is also a writer and has written several books. In 2003 he was homaged in Casa Piedra by hard-line Pinochetists for "rescuing the historical truth of Chile".

In December 2019 Pérez de Arce was expelled from the TV program Bienvenidos by hostress Tonka Tomicic for his repeated denialist comments. Subsequently, Senator Alejandro Navarro proposed a Chilean law against denialism dubbed "Ley Hermógenes".

== Biography ==
He is the son of Jorge Pérez de Arce Plummer and María Ibieta Egaña. Through his maternal line, he belongs to the Edwards family. His great-grandfather, Hermógenes Pérez de Arce Lopetegui, was one of the first editors of the newspaper El Mercurio, the same outlet where he would later work.

After graduating from Saint George's College, he studied law at the University of Chile, being admitted to the bar in 1959. He also obtained a postgraduate degree in Economics from the Pontifical Catholic University of Chile.

In 1966, the College of Journalists of Chile granted him registration number 900 as recognition, despite not having studied journalism.

He has worked as a professor of law and economics at the University of Chile and the University of the Andes, Chile.

=== Marriage and children ===
He is married to María Soledad Vial Valdés and has four children: Hermógenes, Cristián, Felipe, and Pablo Pérez de Arce Vial.

== Political activity ==
He joined the National Party in 1972, being elected deputy for Santiago (First District) of the 7th Departmental Group in the 1973 parliamentary elections. He was one of the signatories of the Agreement of the Chamber of Deputies of 22 August 1973.

After the coup d’état of 11 September 1973, like the rest of the parliamentarians, he was removed from office when the National Congress was dissolved by Decree-Law No. 27 of the Military Junta. Later, he cooperated with the legislative commissions of the Junta.

In the 1989 parliamentary elections, he was a candidate for senator for Santiago Oriente as an independent within the Democracia y Progreso coalition, but was not elected. In that constituency, his list partner Sebastián Piñera (RN) and PDC candidate Eduardo Frei Ruiz-Tagle were elected.

Since 2019, he has been a member of the emerging political party Fuerza Nacional, classified as far-right.

In May 2021, Fuerza Nacional announced Pérez de Arce’s presidential candidacy for the 2021 Chilean presidential election, even though the party was not yet legally constituted before the Servel.

He is currently a member of Johannes Kaiser's National Libertarian Party.

== Work in the media ==
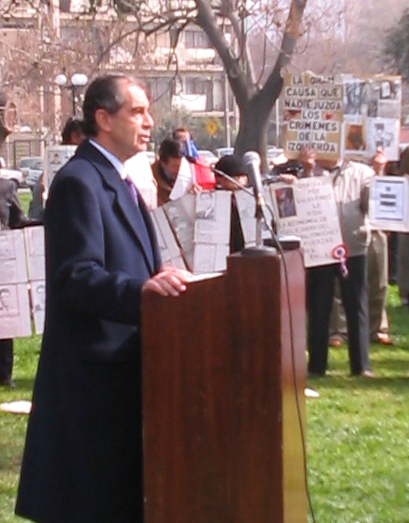
At a public event in 2006.

Right-leaning in his political stance, he became known for the controversial positions expressed in his articles, especially in El Mercurio, where he was a columnist from 1962 until 31 December 2008. From 1982 until his departure, he published a column every Wednesday, focusing mainly after the return to democracy on defending Augusto Pinochet, particularly during his detention in London, becoming a leader for the general’s supporters.

He co-founded the magazine Qué Pasa in 1971, and was director of the newspaper La Segunda between 1976 and 1981. He was also a radio commentator at Radio Agricultura in 1971 and Radio Minería in 1972, and screenwriter of the documentary Chile... y su verdad (1977). From June 1991 to January 1992, he participated in the Truth and Journalism Commission (1960–1990), organized by the College of Journalists to analyze the role of the media in relation to human rights violations in previous decades.

He has also participated in various political talk show programs, such as Polos Opuestos (Megavisión, 1999), where he was co-host along with then–Socialist Party general secretary Camilo Escalona.

Since 2010, he has maintained a blog, where he continues to write about Chilean politics. Through this medium, he claimed that then–President Sebastián Piñera intervened in the 2010 ANFP presidential election by promoting an opposition candidacy against Harold Mayne-Nicholls.
