= Marcelo Bielsa =

Argentine football manager (born 1955)

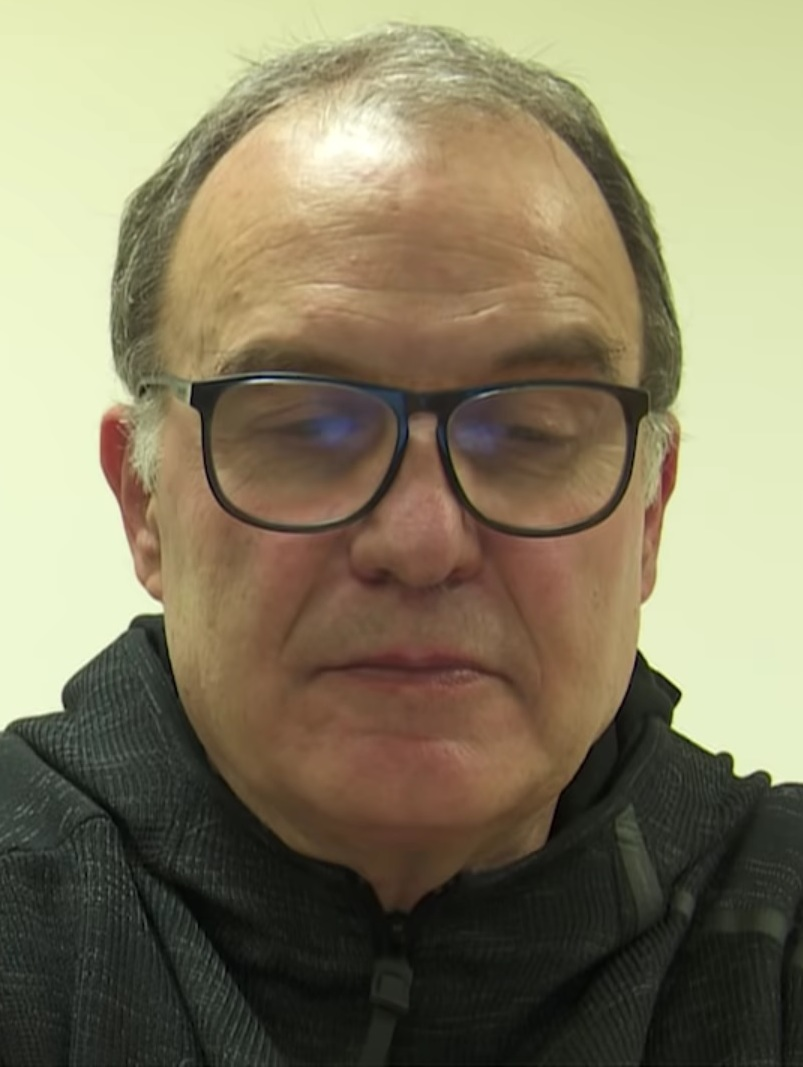
- Bielsa in 2018

Personal information
- Full name: Marcelo Alberto Bielsa
- Date of birth: 21 July 1955 (age 71)
- Place of birth: Rosario, Santa Fe, Argentina
- Position: Defender

Senior career*
Years	Team	Apps	(Gls)
1975–1977	Newell's Old Boys	25	(0)
1978–1979	Instituto	40	(0)
1979–1980	Argentino de Rosario	48	(0)
Total		113	(0)

International career
1976	Argentina U23	4	(0)

Managerial career
- 1987–1990: Newell's Old Boys II
- 1990–1992: Newell's Old Boys
- 1993–1995: Atlas
- 1995–1996: América
- 1997–1998: Vélez Sarsfield
- 1998: Espanyol
- 1998–2004: Argentina
- 2004: Argentina U23
- 2007–2011: Chile
- 2011–2013: Athletic Bilbao
- 2014–2015: Marseille
- 2016: Lazio
- 2017: Lille
- 2018–2022: Leeds United
- 2023–2026: Uruguay
- 2023–2024: Uruguay U23
Medal record
Men's football
Representing Argentina (as manager)
Olympic Games
Gold medal – first place	2004 Athens	Team
Copa América
Runner-up	2004 Peru	Team
Representing Uruguay (as manager)
Copa América
Third place	2024 United States	Team
- * Club domestic league appearances and goals

Marcelo Alberto Bielsa ([maɾˈselo alˈβeɾto ˈβjelsa], (Note: In isolation, Bielsa is pronounced [ˈbjelsa].) nicknamed El Loco Bielsa [ˈloko ˈβjelsa], meaning 'The Madman Bielsa'; born 21 July 1955) is an Argentine professional football manager and former player who most recently managed the Uruguay national team. He is widely regarded as one of the most influential coaches of all time. Bielsa played as a defender for Newell's Old Boys, Instituto, and Argentino de Rosario.

Bielsa played as a defender in Newell's Old Boys' First Division team and was a member of Argentina U23 in the 1976 Pre-Olympic Tournament, but retired when he was 25 to focus on coaching. Bielsa has managed several football clubs and also the national teams of Argentina and Chile. He developed his career as coach of Newell's Old Boys where he won several titles in the early 1990s, before moving to Mexico in 1992, briefly coaching Club Atlas and Club América. Bielsa returned to Argentina in 1997 to manage Vélez Sarsfield, leading them to the 1998 league title (Clausura).

His personality and gestures during his stint in Chile captured the attention of media and unleashed a series of minor controversies both in sports and politics. He had a two year-spell in Spain at Athletic Bilbao between 2011 and 2013, leading them to domestic and continental cup finals in the first season, though they lost both. In May 2014, Bielsa was appointed coach of Marseille, starting with good results but finishing outside the expected first three places in Ligue 1, resigning after just over a year at the French club. He remains highly regarded by Marseille fans for his offensive playing style and personality.

In June 2018, Bielsa was appointed manager of Championship club Leeds United, leading the club to promotion back to the Premier League in 2020 after a 16-year absence as a result of winning the 2019–20 EFL Championship. Leeds United is the club at which he spent the most time as manager in his career, taking charge of 170 games before departing in February 2022. He is considered a cult figure among Leeds fans.

In 2023, he became manager of Uruguay, becoming only the second non-Uruguayan manager to coach the team. He led the team to the semi-finals of the 2024 Copa América and a group stage exit from the 2026 FIFA World Cup.

== Managerial career ==
In 1980, after retiring from playing in football, Bielsa decided to start a career as a football manager. His first job was coaching the youth divisions of Newell's. In 1990, he was given the task of managing their first team, where he would go on to win the 1990 Torneo Apertura and the 1990–91 Torneo Integración, defeating Boca Juniors on penalties. Bielsa managed the squad that competed in the final of the 1992 Copa Libertadores, losing to São Paulo on penalties. Weeks after the Libertadores defeat, Bielsa and Newell's won the 1992 Torneo Clausura. After a period in Mexico, he returned to Argentina and won another league title – the 1998 Clausura – while coaching Vélez Sarsfield.

=== Argentina national team ===
In 1998, Bielsa was given the job of manager at Spanish La Liga side Espanyol, but he soon left after being offered the management of the Argentina national team later that year, taking over after a four-year period by Daniel Passarella as manager. At the 1999 Copa América, Argentina were beaten 3–0 by Colombia in a game where Argentina forward Martin Palermo missed three penalties and Bielsa was sent off. On Bielsa's post match reaction, Tim Vickery of the BBC wrote:

In the press conference he sat staring into space, refusing to make eye contact with anyone – his usual stance. He was asked what he had made of the referee's performance. If the question was predictable, the answer was anything but. "One doesn't usually have the habit of commenting on referees, but…" he said, leaving everyone to believe he would continue with a rant about a joker running amok with a whistle. Instead he proceeded with, "but in respect of my expulsion, the referee was absolutely correct because I protested in an ill mannered form."

Argentina won the qualification group for the 2002 FIFA World Cup, but did not progress through the first knockout round at the tournament. Despite this, Bielsa stayed on his position as Argentine manager. The Albicelestes were runners-up in the 2004 Copa América and won the 2004 Olympic Games' gold medal. With the latter, his team became the first Latin American team to win the Olympic title in football since 1928 (when Uruguay beat Argentina in the final), the first Argentinian Olympic gold medal in 52 years. Bielsa, however, resigned at the end of 2004, being succeeded by José Pékerman.

=== Chile national team ===
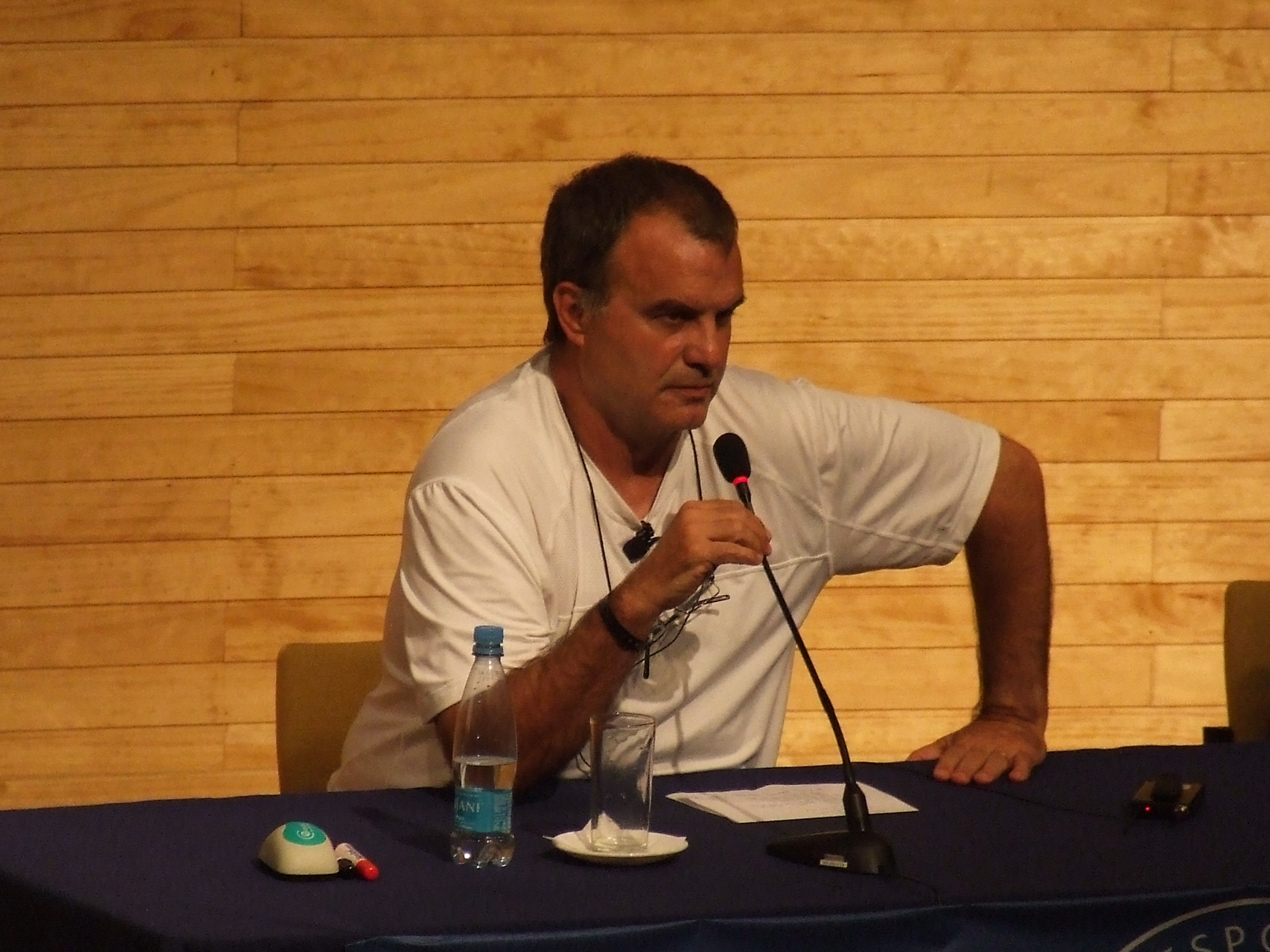
Bielsa at a press conference in 2009, Santiago, Chile

Under Bielsa's guidance, the Chile national team underwent many positive and negative historic firsts. For the first time in its history, Chile was able to earn a point playing Uruguay away in Montevideo. Chile also suffered their worst defeat ever when playing at home during qualifiers losing 3–0 against Paraguay. This historic low was repeated with a Chile loss of 3–0 against Brazil, which also marked the first home loss against Brazil in a qualification game in nearly 50 years. On 15 October 2008, however, Bielsa masterminded a 1–0 win over his native Argentina, Chile's first win ever over Argentina in an official match; Argentina's loss prompted the resignation of its coach Alfio Basile.

Chile soundly beat Peru 3–1 in Lima, a location where they last won in 1985. Bielsa then led Chile to a 2–0 win at the Defensores del Chaco Stadium against hosts Paraguay, obtaining an away triumph on this location for the first time in almost 30 years. The team continued the road to the 2010 World Cup with a victory over Bolivia, 4–0. After a 2–2 tie against Venezuela in Santiago, and travelling to Brazil to lose 2–4, Chile finally achieved qualification to the World Cup after defeating Colombia 4–2, a result that was also Chile's first ever away win against the Colombians.

By helping Chile qualify for a World Cup after two tournament absences, Bielsa attained great popularity there. His appointment brought about visible changes in the Chilean set-up, with the fast-tracking of young talents and a more attacking mindset away from home. Due to the rumors that Bielsa would not continue to lead Chile after finishing their campaign at the World Cup, Chilean fans campaigned for him to remain as coach, with the movement titled "Bielsa is NOT leaving!" Chile reached the round of 16 of the World Cup, where they were eliminated by Brazil. On 2 August 2010, Harold Mayne-Nicholls, President of the Chilean Football Board, announced that Bielsa would remain with the Chile team until 2015. Bielsa, however, stated that he would leave his position if Jorge Segovia was elected as the new President of the Chilean Football Board. He followed through on this threat, despite Segovia's election being annulled, and resigned in February 2011.

According to Hermógenes Pérez de Arce, President of Chile Sebastián Piñera had a personal long-term interest in removing Mayne-Nicholls from the Presidency of the Chilean Football Board and pushed for him to be replaced. Bielsa subsequently made headlines for his brief and cold greeting to Piñera in the farewell before the 2010 FIFA World Cup. Both Bielsa and Mayne-Nicholls had good relations with former president Michelle Bachelet, Piñera's political rival.

=== Athletic Bilbao ===
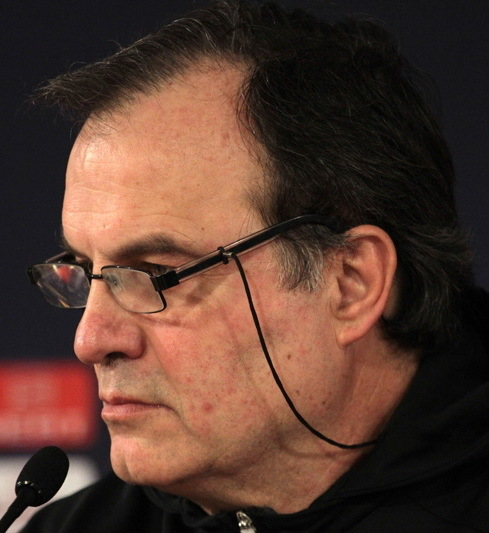
Bielsa as Athletic Bilbao manager in 2012

On 8 July 2011, Josu Urrutia announced Athletic Bilbao would appoint Bielsa as manager after Urrutia promised the appointment of Bielsa in his campaign to become president of the club. On 18 August 2011, Bielsa took charge of his first game at San Mamés, drawing 0–0 against Turkish side Trabzonspor in the UEFA Europa League play-offs.

On 3 October 2011, Bielsa, a devout Roman Catholic, visited the Poor Clares of Guernica, Spain, alongside his wife. He wanted them to pray for his team, which they continued to do. The players began to adjust to the changes as the season progressed, and following an away victory at local rivals Real Sociedad. Athletic Bilbao produced a good run of autumn form which included wins over Paris Saint-Germain, Osasuna and Sevilla, as well as credible draws with Valencia and Barcelona, then only to drop points at home to newly promoted Granada. The team also finished top of their UEFA Europa League group and defeated Lokomotiv Moscow in the last 32.

Athletic then drew Manchester United and in impressive style won 3–2 in the first leg at Old Trafford, going on to knock them out of the tournament with a 2–1 victory at home. In the quarter-final, they went to Schalke 04 and won the first leg 4–2, despite being 2–1 down after a Raúl brace on 72 minutes. Athletic drew the second leg against Schalke 2–2, going through to the semi-finals with a favourable aggregate score of 6–4 to face Sporting CP.

After Athletic lost the first leg of the semi-final 2–1 in Lisbon, they overturned this result in the return leg and ran out 4–3 winners on aggregate when Fernando Llorente scored the winner in the 88th minute. This set up a match with Atlético Madrid in an all-Spanish Europa League final. Athletic, however, would lose 3–0 in the final, played on 9 May at the Arena Națională, Bucharest. On 25 May 2012, Athletic also lost the Copa del Rey Final against Barcelona at the Vicente Calderón Stadium, falling 3–0.

The 2012–13 season was a major disappointment for Athletic: the sale of key midfielder Javi Martínez to Bayern Munich, and striker Fernando Llorente being frozen out of the club over contract disagreements, led to the Lions' performances faltering. After finishing only in 12th place in La Liga, on 7 June 2013 Athletic's president revealed that Bielsa would not be offered a new contract. When it expired on 30 June 2013, he left the club.

=== Marseille ===
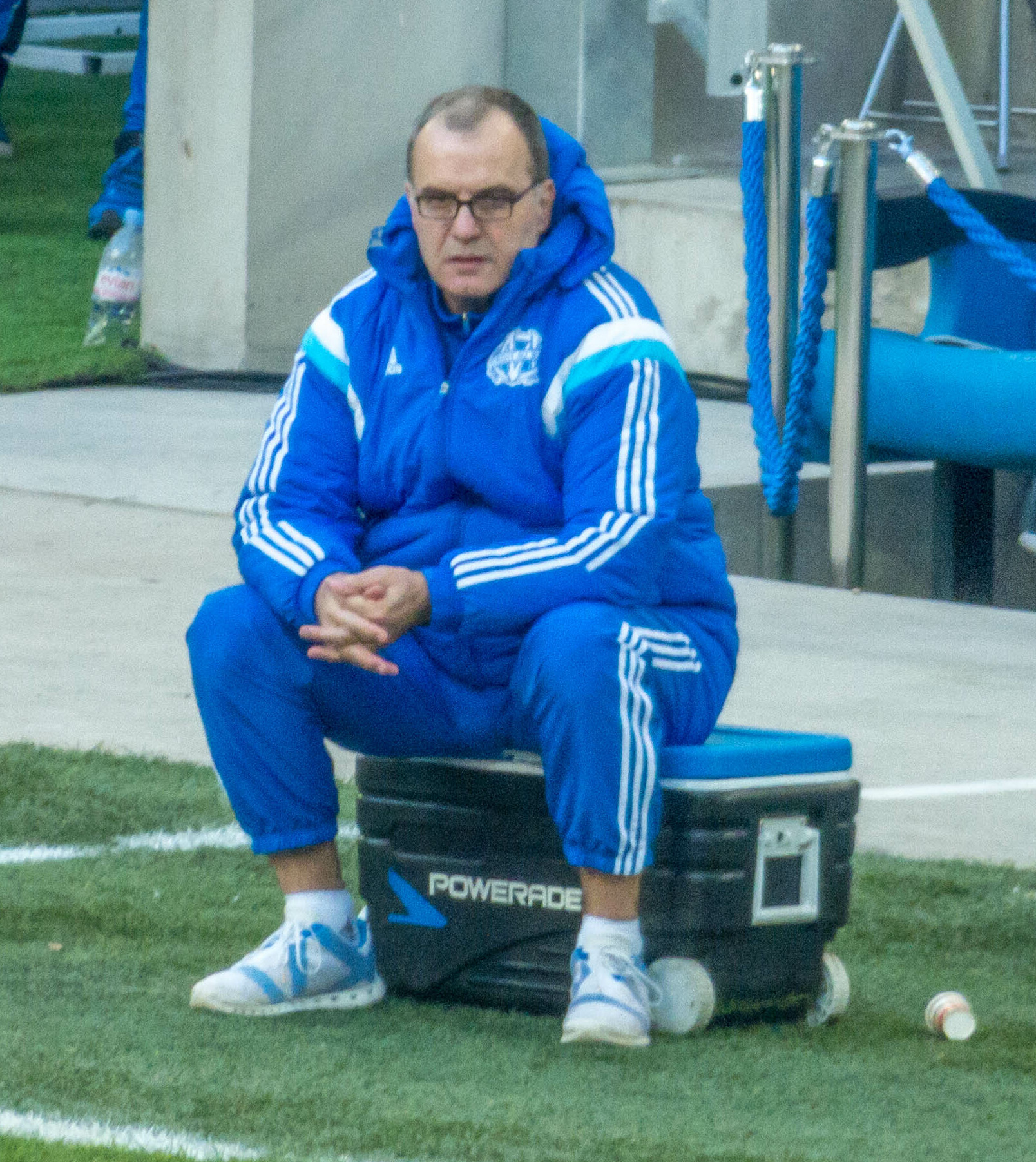
Bielsa with Marseille in 2015

On 2 May 2014, Marseille president Vincent Labrune announced the hiring of Bielsa as his team's coach on RMC, a French radio station. Labrune had previously confirmed an agreement in principle had been reached after the club's 0–0 Ligue 1 draw with Lille on 20 April. Bielsa signed a two-year contract set to begin after the 2014 World Cup, thus becoming the club's first Argentine coach. He led them to the symbolic title of "autumn champions" after they beat Lille on Matchday 19 (on 21 December 2014) of the 2014–15 Ligue 1 season before they faded to finish fourth in Ligue 1 at the end of the season. On 8 August 2015, after Marseille lost their opening 2015–16 Ligue 1 match against Caen, Bielsa announced his resignation due to conflicts with the club's management, stating that changes had been made to his contract.

=== Lazio ===
On 5 July 2016, Bielsa was appointed manager of Italian club Lazio of Serie A. However, just two days later, on 8 July, Bielsa quit as the club's manager, prompting Lazio to issue legal action against Bielsa for breach of contract, suing him for €50 million. Bielsa later explained that the club had been unable to recruit the players he had wanted by the deadline he had given to the club and did not feel that his needs would be supported during the transfer window.

=== Lille ===
On 24 May 2017, Bielsa was unveiled as the new manager of Ligue 1 club Lille on a two-year contract. Upon joining, Bielsa wanted to bring a more youthful side to Lille's squad and before the season started he informed 11 experienced players, including Vincent Enyeama, Marko Baša, Rio Mavuba and Eder, that they could leave the club. Then-Lille player Éric Bauthéac revealed that Bielsa informed the players he wanted to leave in a conversation before pre-season had even began. Bielsa then signed younger 'promising' players such as Nicolas Pépé, Thiago Mendes, Thiago Maia, Kévin Malcuit, Fodé Ballo-Touré, Luiz Araújo and Edgar Ié.

On 22 November 2017, Bielsa was suspended as coach after just 13 games in charge, with Lille announcing he had been "suspended momentarily as coach" pending further announcement. After Bielsa's initial suspension, Lille appointed a four-man 'technical coaching unit' of Fernando Da Cruz, Joao Sacramento, Benoit Delaval and Franck Mantaux. On 15 December 2017, Lille announced Bielsa's contract had now been terminated. Christophe Galtier was named as Bielsa's replacement as manager on 29 December 2017. Sporting adviser Luis Campos said after Bielsa left that he felt the decision to let some of the experienced players leave was the key to the departure.

=== Leeds United ===
==== 2018–19 ====
In June 2018, Bielsa became Championship club Leeds United's new head coach to replace Paul Heckingbottom, signing a two-year contract with the option of a third year. He became the highest-paid manager in Leeds United history. Bielsa won his first four games, making him the first Leeds United manager to record four consecutive wins at the start of their tenure. He went on to lead Leeds through the first six Championship rounds unbeaten and to top of the league, and was awarded Championship Manager of the Month for August 2018 by the EFL.

Bielsa's unbeaten start was ended on 22 September with a 2–1 home defeat, inflicted by Birmingham City, despite the home side having most of the possession and chances. Bielsa's Leeds had to endure an extensive injury list with several of his squad picking up injuries within the first few months. However, with Leeds still in the Championship automatic promotion positions at the start of December 2018, Bielsa was praised for his integration of United academy players to cover the gaps and over the course of 2018–19 he gave 10 players under 21 their senior debuts. On 23 December, after a dramatic late 2–3 win against Aston Villa, half-way through the season, Bielsa's Leeds side sat top of the Championship, despite continued injuries. Bielsa was nominated for the Championship Manager of the Month award for December 2018, but lost to Hull City's Nigel Adkins.

Before a 2–0 victory over Derby County on 11 January 2019, which increased Leeds' lead at the top of the table, in the match build-up Bielsa admitted he had sent a spy to the Derby training ground, after reports emerged that a man was spotted the previous day outside their training ground. Derby manager Frank Lampard was critical of Bielsa's method. On 12 January, Leeds United released a statement. Tottenham Hotspur manager Mauricio Pochettino described the incident as "not a big deal" and commonplace in Argentina. Manchester City manager Pep Guardiola, when asked about Bielsa due to his scouting methods, described him as "the best" and said "everyone who works with him is a better player and the teams are better. That's why he's a special manager and special person". On 15 January, the EFL announced they would be investigating. With intense media scrutiny on what was coined 'Spygate', dividing opinion, on 16 January 2019, Bielsa announced a press briefing, where he gave an analysis of his research, detailing his meticulousness, thoroughness and preparation over his opponents, with some journalists describing it as a 'coaching masterclass' and 'genius'. Bielsa's 'Spygate' saga was resolved on 18 February, when Leeds were fined £200,000 by the EFL for breach of a portion of Rule 3.4 of EFL Regulations ("In all matters and transactions relating to The League each Club shall behave towards each other Club and The League with the utmost good faith.), with the EFL announcing a new rule, that teams could not watch opposition training up to 72 hours before a game. Bielsa paid the £200,000 fine out of his own pocket. With Leeds in second place with just four games to go, and thus in the automatic promotion position ahead of rivals Sheffield United, on 19 April, Leeds lost in a shock 1–2 defeat against relegation-threatened Wigan Athletic, with Leeds playing 70 minutes against ten men after Wigan had Cédric Kipré sent off. The result proved costly, as Sheffield United overtook them on goal difference.

On 28 April 2019, Bielsa made one of the most contentious managerial calls of the Championship season in Leeds' penultimate league game against Aston Villa, at Elland Road. In the 72nd minute of a tight game between teams jostling for position in the playoffs, albeit with Leeds still mathematically able to gain automatic promotion, Villa's Jonathan Kodjia was injured and remained on the ground, Tyler Roberts passed the ball up the line to Mateusz Klich who took it up the left wing and put the ball into the far corner past Jed Steer. The goal – the first of the game – sparked pandemonium, with Villa's Conor Hourihane, Ahmed Elmohamady, Neil Taylor and Leeds' Patrick Bamford caught up in a fracas with Klich at its centre, which involved additional players from both sides and was eventually broken up by referee Stuart Attwell, Elland Road stewards and other players. In the immediate aftermath, Attwell sent off the peripherally involved Anwar El Ghazi with a straight red card and Bielsa's response to his players was, in the interests of fairness and after consulting with Villa boss Dean Smith, that his team should allow an unchallenged equaliser to be scored; Bielsa can be seen shouting "Give the goal! Give the goal!" from the touchline. From the restart, Albert Adomah essentially walked the ball into net unchallenged by 10 Leeds players, with only a frustrated and disbelieving Pontus Jansson giving chase and nearly dispossessing the forward. The game remained 1–1 and put the second automatic promotion spot mathematically out of reach for Leeds and saw them enter the play-offs. Bielsa and the team were awarded the 2019 FIFA Fair Play Award in September 2019, for their actions, with the FIFA citation noting that "The game finished 1–1, ultimately allowing their promotion rivals Sheffield United to guarantee their automatic spot in the Premier League, at Leeds' expense. What was at stake makes Bielsa's act of sportmanship all the more remarkable".

At the end of 2018–19, with Leeds missing out on automatic promotion, Bielsa said he refused to blame the club for missing out on signing winger Daniel James, whose deal fell through dramatically on deadline day in the 2019 January transfer window, but said "I'm not underlying the importance of the absence of James". Leeds finished third and qualified for the playoffs, Leeds had key players out injured for their playoff campaign. In the semi-final playoffs versus sixth-placed Derby County, they were beaten on 3–4 aggregate over the two legs. Despite taking a 1–0 win at Pride Park into the home leg at Elland Road, Bielsa's Leeds lost 4–2 in an encounter that saw both teams reduced to 10 men and Derby progress to the final against Aston Villa. With Bielsa denying the narrative of 'Bielsa Burnout' (journalists' theory that his sides tire in the second half of a season), Bielsa said one of the big reasons Leeds failed to gain promotion was their profligacy in front of goal, saying that statistically Leeds needed more chances to score compared to their league rivals.

==== 2019–20: Promotion to the Premier League ====
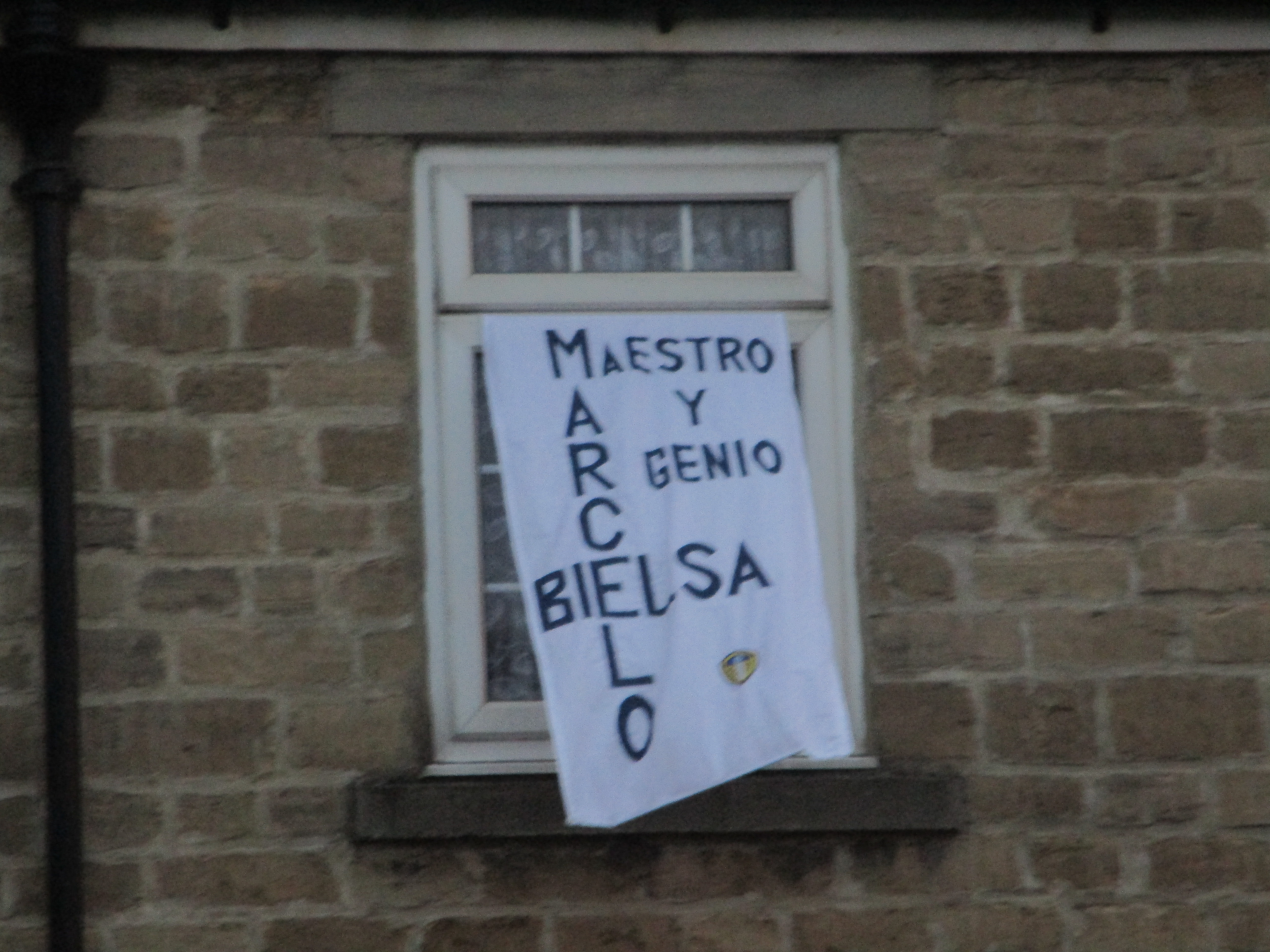
Banner in honour of Bielsa in Wetherby, West Yorkshire, following Leeds United's promotion to the Premier League

On 28 May 2019, Bielsa and Leeds jointly exercised the option on Bielsa's contract to continue as Leeds head coach for the following 2019–20 season. After Bielsa had signed his new contract, Leeds announced the signings of Hélder Costa, Ben White (loan), Jack Harrison (loan), Jack Clarke (loan), Illan Meslier (loan) and Eddie Nketiah (loan) in their bid to get back to the Premier League in the 2019–20 EFL Championship season. Defender Pontus Jansson was told by Bielsa to return to training later than the rest of the first team squad in order to give him time to find a new club, with him no longer in Bielsa's plans for the upcoming season. Jansson was subsequently sold to Brentford.

After beating Yorkshire rivals Barnsley on 15 September 2019, Bielsa's Leeds side remained top of the Championship after seven games during the 2019–20 EFL Championship. Leeds continued to impress throughout November and Bielsa won the EFL Championship Manager of the Month for November.

Bielsa's side returned to top of the league on 29 December 2019 thus ending the decade at the top of the Championship after a 4–5 victory in a dramatic win against Birmingham City. On 1 January 2020, Leeds drew with then-second-placed West Bromwich Albion in a 1–1 draw. The result kept Leeds on top of the table on goal difference. However, after the game it was revealed that Arsenal had recalled Eddie Nketiah. Bielsa had also lost loanee Jack Clarke who had been recalled by Tottenham Hotspur, with Bielsa stating that he would be looking to replace both players. The club secured replacements for both players during the January transfer window, signing Jean-Kévin Augustin on loan from RB Leipzig and Ian Poveda on a four-and-a-half-year contract from Manchester City.

After the English professional football season was paused in March 2020 due to the COVID-19 pandemic, the season was resumed during June. Under Bielsa, Leeds United secured promotion to the Premier League on 17 July 2020 with two matches remaining of the 2019–20 season and also became the EFL Championship Champions for the 2019–20 season, finishing 10 points ahead of second placed West Bromwich Albion.

On 18 July, after Bielsa had delivered promotion, a street in Leeds city centre was renamed 'Marcelo Bielsa Way'. After the achievement of being crowned Champions of the Championship and guiding Leeds to the Premier League after a 16-year absence, on 27 July 2020, Bielsa was named the LMA Championship Manager of the Year 2020. On 31 July, Bielsa won the Championship Manager of the Month award for July. On 11 September 2020, Bielsa signed a new contract to stay at Leeds for the 2020–21 Premier League season.

==== 2020–21 ====
On 12 September 2020 Bielsa's first game as head coach in the Premier League ended in a 4–3 defeat at Anfield against reigning champions Liverpool. Conversely the first Premier League game at Elland Road for 16 years saw Leeds come out 4–3 victors against fellow promoted club Fulham.

These two games set the tone for a free scoring, free conceding first half to the season, earning Bielsa and his team many plaudits for their style of play and culminating in Bielsa placing 3rd in The Best FIFA Football Coach award on 17 December. As if for emphasis, the two week period following the awards witnessed a 5–2 home win against Newcastle United on 16 December, followed by a 6–2 defeat against Manchester United at Old Trafford; only for the year to end in a 5–0 away victory at West Brom nine days later.

Despite the New Year starting poorly with a 3–0 away loss to Tottenham, and an ignominious 3–0 FA Cup defeat to Crawley Town, Bielsa's Leeds ended the campaign strongly. They lost just one of their last 11 games while securing impressive results against the league's top sides. This included draws at home against Manchester United, Chelsea and defending champions Liverpool, as well as victories against Tottenham at home and champions-elect Manchester City at the Etihad Stadium (despite playing most of the match with just ten men). Leeds United eventually finished ninth; securing more points and scoring more goals than any other promoted side for 20 years.

==== 2021–22 ====
On 27 February 2022, Leeds and Bielsa parted ways after a streak of four consecutive losses across which Leeds conceded 17 goals, leaving them 16th in the table, two points above Burnley and one above Everton, both of whom had two games in hand on Leeds.

=== Uruguay national team ===
On 15 May 2023, the Uruguay national team announced Bielsa as their new manager, becoming the second foreign trainer after another Argentinian coach, Daniel Passarella, was appointed in the year 2000. (Note: Even though Juan Hohberg was also Argentinian, he became a nationalized Uruguayan before becoming the national team coach.) After the poor performance of Uruguay at the 2022 FIFA World Cup, Bielsa decided to rejuvenate the team by calling 14 uncapped new players for friendly matches against Nicaragua and Cuba, leaving the veteran players who participated in the World Cup four times (2010, 2014, 2018, and 2022) Edinson Cavani, Fernando Muslera, and Luis Suárez out of the squad. On 14 June, Bielsa started his cycle as Uruguay's coach with a 4–1 victory over Nicaragua in the Estadio Centenario; six days later at the same venue, his team defeated Cuba 2–0. Controversially, Bielsa decided once again not to call up the veterans in his next set of matches; the press were especially concerned by the absence of Cavani and Suárez, and also by his team conformation, with Sergio Rochet being the oldest one in the squad. On 8 September, Bielsa managed to get a 3–1 home victory over Chile in first game of the 2026 FIFA World Cup qualifiers. Four days later in Quito, Uruguay lost against Ecuador 2–1 despite leading the score at the end of the first half. Darwin Núñez was substituted at half time, and Bielsa declared to the press that the reason behind was preventive since the player arrived to the squad with "muscular difficulties".

After drawing against Colombia 2–2 in Barranquilla with a late penalty equalizer by Núñez, Uruguay obtained a victory on 17 October against Brazil by 2–0, with Núñez scoring with a header and Nicolás de la Cruz adding a second in the second half. The victory ended a 22-year streak of Brazilian dominance over Uruguay in all official competitions and friendly matches, accumulating a total of 12 bouts without wins after the match of 1 July 2001 for the 2002 FIFA World Cup qualifiers. It was also Brazil's first loss in qualifiers since 2015, ending a 37-match unbeaten streak. On 16 November and with a returning Suárez on the squad after an excellent season with Grêmio, Bielsa's team defeated world champions Argentina in La Bombonera. Ronald Araújo scored the first goal in the 41st minute, and the second goal was scored by Núñez after a fast-paced counterattack that started when Rodrigo Bentancur managed to steal a ball from Lionel Messi close to Uruguay's penalty area. The victory was lauded by the press and fans, and ended a 10-year streak of Argentina supremacy, with the last defeat coming from the 2014 qualifiers on 15 October 2013. It also ended their 25-match streak without defeats in qualifiers since 2017, and it was the first defeat of Argentina as world champions. Days later they secured another home victory of 3–0 against Bolivia, with Núñez scoring a brace to end 2023.

Bielsa coached Uruguay's under-23 team at the 2024 CONMEBOL Pre-Olympic Tournament, where they failed to advance past the group stage.

Bielsa led Uruguay to the semi-finals of the 2024 Copa América, defeating Brazil in the quarter-finals on penalties. In September 2025, Uruguay secured qualification for their fifth consecutive FIFA World Cup following a 3–0 victory over Peru. At the 2026 FIFA World Cup, Uruguay drew 1–1 with Saudi Arabia and 2–2 with Cape Verde before suffering a 1–0 defeat to Spain, finishing third of their group and being eliminated from the tournament. Following the group-stage exit, reports highlighted strained relationships between Bielsa and several senior players, with tensions over his demanding management style and communication methods. Bielsa resigned after the defeat. At his press conference, he addressed criticism of his approach in a marathon 100-minute press conference, where he reflected on Uruguay's elimination and insisted that his tactical ideas had been largely ignored within the team environment.

== Coaching style ==
Hailed as one of the most influential coaches of all time, introducing a third wave ideology in Argentine coaching, previously influenced by César Luis Menotti and Carlos Bilardo. In 2017, Pep Guardiola described Bielsa as the best coach in the world. He has been a strong influence on his former players, many of whom later became coaches, including Mauricio Pochettino, Diego Simeone, Andoni Iraola and Marcelo Gallardo.

Bielsa's signature formation in his squads is the 3–3–3–1 formation, which he became known for during his coaching tenures with the Argentina and Chile national teams and with Marseille.

Although the 3–3–3–1 and its variations the 3–3–1–3 and the 3–4–3 "diamond" were occasionally used by other managers at UEFA Champions League and FIFA World Cup level before Bielsa – including by Johan Cruyff at Barcelona, by Louis van Gaal at Ajax, by Guus Hiddink at PSV Eindhoven and Australia, by Vicente del Bosque at Real Madrid, by Ottmar Hitzfeld at Bayern Munich, by Frank Pagelsdorf at Hamburger SV, by Ivica Osim at Sturm Graz, and by Russia – it was Bielsa who first made it his standard formation and popularized it worldwide during his tenures with Argentina, Chile, at Marseille, and occasionally at Athletic Bilbao.

For this formation, the players are: three defenders, three midfielders (one central midfielder with two wide players / wing backs), three attacking midfielders (one No.10 and two wingers) and one centre-forward. The 3–3–3–1 allows quick transitions from defending to attacking, as many of the players used in the formation can perform both defensive and attacking tasks. Moreover, it establishes superiority in numbers in every part of the field, since with this formation his teams could defend with seven players, attack with six or seven players, or protect a scoreline by overwhelming the midfield with six players. To use 3–3–3–1, all players have to quickly set to attacking positions when the ball is in the team's possession, and all players have to aggressively press and recover the ball when it is not in possession, so it requires great teamwork and understanding between teammates.

When he took the Argentina job, at the end of his first training session Bielsa handed the players a pencil and a little slip of paper. He wanted them to write down whether they wanted to line up with a back three or a four. He went through all the replies. "Back four, back four, back four... This clearly shows your preference for a line of four. But I'm telling you that from now on we're going to be playing with a back three. See you tomorrow." And he won them over, bringing them round to his way of thinking.

— BBC South American football correspondent Tim Vickery.

He adapted to an attacking 4–3–3 at Athletic Bilbao (as seen in the 2012 UEFA Europa League Final), with full-backs pushing forward and a converted midfielder in the back line also involved in build-up play, with the pressing and coordination elements still in evidence.

In the 2018–19 season at Leeds United, Bielsa introduced a 4–1–4–1 formation, with Kalvin Phillips converted from a box-to-box or attacking midfielder into the deep-lying midfielder. When facing a team who played with two central strikers, Bielsa would switch to the 3–3–3–1, with Phillips dropping further back into the defensive line as a centre-back or "sweeper", or Luke Ayling shifting from right back.

This signature style of Bielsa's has had so much influence in the football scene that many present coaches – former players under Bielsa's command – are heavily influenced by the style, such as Gerardo Martino, Mauricio Pochettino, Diego Simeone, Matías Almeyda, Eduardo Berizzo, Mauricio Pellegrino, Santiago Solari, Andrea Pisanu and Marcelo Gallardo. Former Manchester City manager Pep Guardiola credited Bielsa as his tactical inspiration and called him the "best manager in the world" in 2012. Jorge Sampaoli, former manager of Argentina, Sevilla and Chile, has been described as a "disciple" of Bielsa.

Former Argentina national team captain Roberto Ayala, a defender under Bielsa, stated: "Sometimes we wouldn't see any of the strikers, because he'd have them training at a different time, and it was the same with the midfielders".

Bielsa is known for watching and collecting numerous football videos to the point of obsession. He edits and analyses each video for each individual player. He also uses statistical software and other technological tools to prepare for games. John Carlin, an English journalist, has stated that Bielsa has "the most learned football library on the planet".

Bielsa likes to systematise the game. He says that there are 29 distinct formations in football and believes that every young player should be given the opportunity to experience each of them.

Discovered by Bielsa, prolific former Argentina national team striker Gabriel Batistuta proclaimed Bielsa to be "the one who taught me how to train on rainy days, he taught me everything". Fernando Llorente, who played under Bielsa at Athletic Bilbao, said of his former coach, "At first he seems tough and he may even annoy you with his persistence and don't-take-no-for-an-answer resilience, but in the end he is a genius." Chile international Alexis Sánchez said of Bielsa: "I learned a lot from him and it is because of him that I am who I am." Former Bayern Munich player Javi Martínez who worked with Bielsa at Bilbao, said that 'Bielsa taught me a lot, how to play as a centre-back and to learn a different style of football, everyone should work with him at least once in their life.'

Bielsa is credited with the rise of the Leeds United and England international player Kalvin Phillips, with former Leeds United manager Howard Wilkinson stating: "Bielsa can take huge credit for the player that Phillips has developed into".

Manchester City and France player Benjamin Mendy noted for his improvement under Bielsa at Marseille, said Bielsa had "given back to him the strength and aggressiveness lost last year." His club and international teammate Aymeric Laporte who was given his debut by Bielsa at Athletic Bilbao, described him as a 'mentor' figure, while fellow France international Dimitri Payet who worked with Bielsa at Marseille said: "The season with Marcelo Bielsa made me grow, as a man and especially on the field, in the game, he gave me important bases that I still use today." Former Lille player Nicolas Pépé who was signed by Bielsa for Lille described Bielsa as 'special' and a 'great coach'.

Bielsa's unique style continued at Leeds, where to receive a work permit from the UK government, he had to prove "exceptional talent": he did so by compiling a dossier of every formation used in every Championship match during the 2017–18 season, with notes on frequency and variations. Once at the Yorkshire club, he instituted all-day training sessions, gave the first team their own private space at Thorp Arch, and had sleeping quarters installed in his office so he could devote more time to match analysis. As a motivational tactic, Bielsa once made players pick up litter around the training ground for three hours, as he had been told that was how long an average Leeds fan worked to afford a ticket.

Some critics have argued that the taxing demands of Bielsa's management style have led to his teams starting a season brightly before a dip in performances as players begin to tire.

In August 2019, Bielsa was one of the main stars of Leeds United documentary Take Us Home documenting the 2018–19 season on Amazon Prime, featuring in several episodes in voiceover, before doing an interview for the final episode "The End". The documentary was narrated by actor and Leeds United fan Russell Crowe. After Leeds' 4–0 defeat of then-chasing rivals West Bromwich Albion at home on 1 March 2019 in Take Us Home, Bielsa (through a translator) mused on the nature of victory:

I came to be part of a programme that has goals, and of course we are aware of the goals wanted by the city and the club, the players, the fans, everybody. But I also can't say that my only interest is winning. What also interests me is the way we build to the victory.

== Managerial statistics ==
As of 30 June 2026

Managerial record by team and tenure
Team	Nat.	From	To	Record					Ref.
Team	Nat.	From	To	G	W	D	L	Win %	Ref.
Newell's Old Boys	(Argentina)	1 July 1990	30 June 1992	97	39	38	20	40.21	
Atlas	(Mexico)	1 July 1993	31 January 1995	77	29	20	28	37.66	
América	(Mexico)	1 July 1995	25 March 1996	33	10	14	9	30.30	
Vélez Sársfield	(Argentina)	1 July 1997	30 June 1998	44	23	14	7	52.27	
Espanyol	(Spain)	10 July 1998	19 October 1998	12	3	3	6	25.00	
Argentina	(Argentina)	20 October 1998	15 September 2004	85	56	18	11	65.88	
Chile	(Chile)	11 July 2007	4 February 2011	51	28	8	15	54.90	
Athletic Bilbao	(Spain)	7 July 2011	30 June 2013	113	43	31	39	38.05	
Marseille	(France)	17 May 2014	8 August 2015	41	21	7	13	51.22	
Lille	(France)	24 May 2017	15 December 2017	14	3	4	7	21.43	
Leeds United	(England)	15 June 2018	27 February 2022	170	81	30	59	47.65	
Uruguay	(Uruguay)	15 May 2023	30 June 2026	39	15	16	8	38.46	
Career Total				776	350	206	220	45.10	

== Honours ==
=== Player ===
Individual

- CONMEBOL Pre-Olympic Tournament Ideal Team: 1976

=== Manager ===
Newell's Old Boys

- Primera División Argentina: 1990–91, 1992 Clausura
- Copa Libertadores runner-up: 1992

Vélez Sarsfield

- Primera División Argentina: 1998 Clausura

Argentina

- CONMEBOL Pre-Olympic Tournament: 2004
- Copa América runner-up: 2004

Argentina U23

- Summer Olympics: 2004

Athletic Bilbao

- Copa del Rey runner-up: 2011–12
- UEFA Europa League runner-up: 2011–12

Leeds United

- EFL Championship: 2019–20

Uruguay

- Copa América third place: 2024

Individual

- IFFHS World's Best National Coach: 2001; runner-up: 2004
- South American Coach of the Year: 2009
- LMA Championship Manager of the Year: 2020
- EFL Championship Manager of the Month: August 2018, November 2019, July 2020
- FIFA Fair Play Award: 2019 (shared with his club Leeds United)
- The Best FIFA Football Coach: 2020 (3rd place)
- IFFHS CONMEBOL Team of the Year Manager: 2020
