= Latinoamérica Televisión =

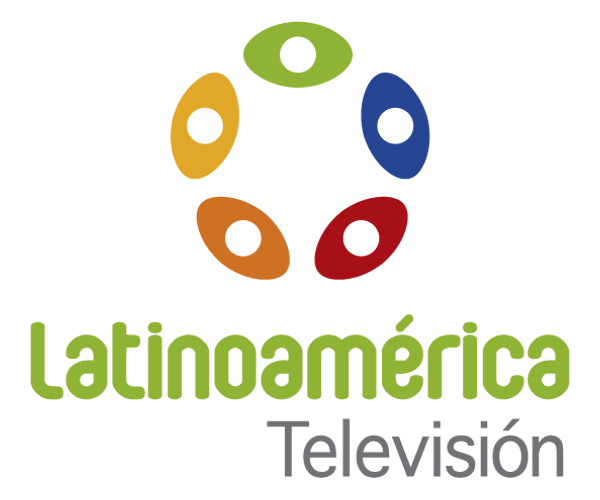
- Country: Uruguay
- Broadcast area: United States

History
- Founded: 2002
- Launched: January 10, 2006

Latinoamérica Televisión (also known as LTV) was a television network based in Uruguay catering the Latin American diaspora in the United States and Canada, financed by Teledoce and produced at its studios in Montevideo. Its programming was mostly imported, coming in from its partners (Teledoce, Canal 13, Telefuturo, TV Globo's international sales unit, etc.) as well as a limited number of original programs, mostly news. The channel closed in 2015.

== History ==
Latinoamérica Televisión was announced in 2005; in February of that year, Globo TV International held negotiations with the upstart channel to supply editions of Globo Repórter, for which LTV was in charge of post-producing the Spanish-language version. and held its inaugural ceremony in Montevideo on December 19, eyeing a January 2006 launch on DirecTV in the United States. Initial partners on board were Canal 13 from Chile, Telefuturo from Paraguay, Globo TV International (TV Globo's international sales unit) from Brazil, Teledoce from Uruguay, Televideo from Colombia, CDF from Chile, AccuWeather from the United States and Nueva Imagen (founded by Fernando Acuña Diaz) of Chile. The launch of the channel also implied the creation of a television program produced by AméricaEconomía. Broadcasts began on January 10, 2006 on DirecTV's Para Todos package.

At the end of April, it signed an agreement with the BBC's Spanish service BBC Mundo to supply the channel with news items already available on its website. ATB from Bolivia joined in August 2006.

In September 2007, the channel launched on UBI World TV in Australia and Oceania, then in October, it made its first Central American contact, with Guatemalan company CPTV International.

On October 3, 2011, the channel unveiled a new logo and a revised schedule.

The channel closed at an unknown date in 2015.
