= Erik Larson =

Erik or Eric Larson may refer to:

- Eric Larson (1905–1988), Disney animator
- Erik Larson (author) (born 1954), American author
- Erik Larson (figure skater), former American figure skater
- Erik J. Larson, American computer scientist
- Erik Larson, guitarist in Alabama Thunderpussy

== See also ==
- Erik Larsen (disambiguation)
- Erik Larsson (disambiguation)
