= Francoist influence in Chile =

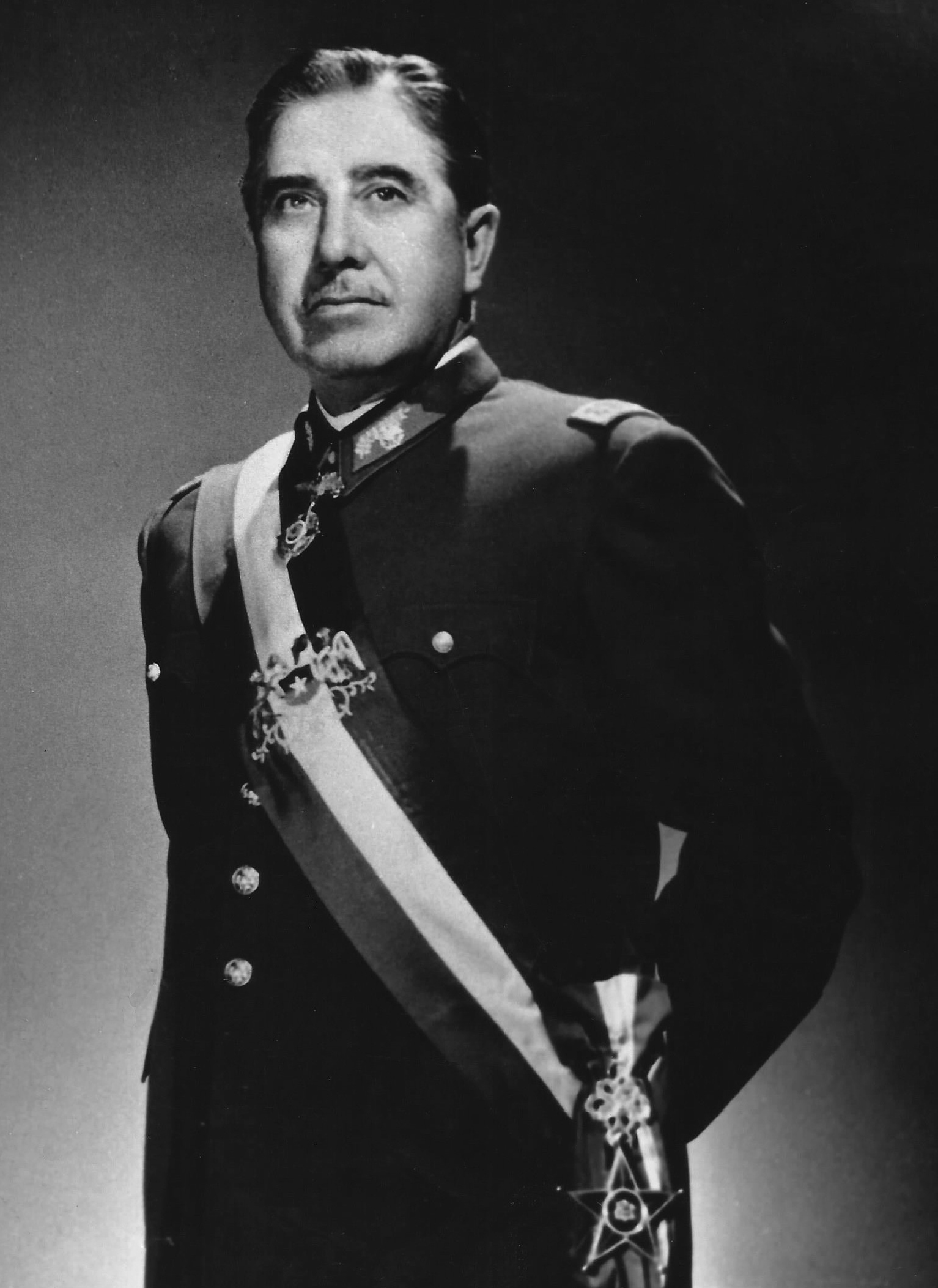
Augusto Pinochet was an admirer of Francisco Franco.

Spanish Francoism had an influence abroad in Chile, where it found clear expressions in the military dictatorship era (1973–1990), in particular in the period prior to 1980.

== Impact of Eyzaguirre's white legend and Guzmán's Guildist Movement ==
Traditionalist historian Jaime Eyzaguirre was an admirer of Francoist Spain. Eyzaguirre did not promote Francoism in Chile but wrote a historiography that exalted the Spanish heritage in Chile to the point of being considered by some an exponent of the white legend. He received various awards from Francoist Spain. The lawyer Jaime Guzmán, once a student of Eyzaguirre, helped establishing the Francoist-influenced Guildist Movement at the Pontifical Catholic University of Chile in the 1960s. This has been interpreted as a reaction inspired in Francoist corporatism against elements of the Chilean university reform. The movement rapidly gained a long-lasting influence in the Catholic universities of Chile. The Guildists, presenting themselves as apolitical, were highly critical of perceived detrimental ideological influences in the Church, corporations (e.g. trade unions) and the Christian Democratic Party.

Francisco Franco can not be classified as a dictator, since his admission to power is more than [enough] legitimized, by a people that rose in arms for God, for Spain and for Franco.

— Jaime Guzmán, ¡Viva Franco, arriba España!, Revista Escolar N° 436, Santiago, 1962.

== Guzmán's role in writing a new constitution for Chile ==
Already in the first days after the 1973 Chilean coup d'état Guzmán became advisor and speechwriter of dictator Augusto Pinochet. While writing the Constitution of Chile of 1980 Jaime Guzmán studied the institutionalization of Francoism in Spain with the aim of preventing undesired reforms in future as it happened in Spain with the post-Franco constitution of 1977. Josemaría Escrivá, the founder of Opus Dei, visited Chile 1974 after which Opus Dei begun to spread in the country. Opus Dei helped establish the University of the Andes in 1989. Both the University of the Andes and the political party Independent Democratic Union, founded in 1983 by Guzmán, have a Francoist heritage. In the 1970s Pinochet's dictatorship organized ritualized acts reminiscent of Francoist Spain, notably Acto de Chacarillas. After 1980 Francoist influence gave way to economic liberalism. Even Guzmán, once clearly influenced by Francoist corporatism adopted economic liberalism from the Chicago Boys and writings such as The Spirit of Democratic Capitalism.

== Diplomatic relatiobs between Franco and his admirer Pinochet ==
Chilean dictator Augusto Pinochet was an admirer of Franco and while they never met in person, they exchanged letters and Franco bestowed Pinochet the Grand Cross of Military Merit. In 1975 Pinochet and his wife Lucía Hiriart attended the funeral of Francisco Franco. During his visit to Spain, Pinochet visited the Valley of the Fallen and expressed his wish for a similar monument to be built in Chile in his honor. One year earlier –in 1974– General Francisco Gorigoitía Herrera, a vocal supporter of Franco, became Chilean ambassador to Spain and held that position until 1977. When Pinochet died in 2006 supporters of late Francisco Franco paid homage in Spain. Antonio Tejero, who led the failed coup of 1981, attended a memorial service in Madrid. The magazine Portada, published from 1969 to 1976, was a place where Chilean traditionalist and conservative intellectuals repeatedly expressed sympathy for ideas associated with Francoism such as "organic democracy" rooted in Medieval institutions and "Hispanic conservatism".
