= Portada =

Chilean cultural and political magazine

Portada was a cultural and political magazine published in Santiago, Chile, from 1969 to 1976. It declared its ideology to be Catholic, non-neutral and opposed to revolution. The magazine was founded by a group of Chilean nationalists associated with Opus Dei. Portada was a place where Chilean traditionalist and conservative intellectuals repeatedly expressed sympathy for ideas associated with Francoism, such as the philosophy of a so-called organic democracy rooted in traditional, pre-modern institutions rather than in universal suffrage, and Hispanic conservatism. Alongside Qué Pasa, Portada was a magazine where much material critical of Salvador Allende and Juan Domingo Perón was published.

The magazine was first published in January 1969, and its 54th and final edition was published in September 1976. The publication had a hiatus between May 1974 and September 1975.

Members of the editorial committee included politicians Carlos Larraín and Hermógenes Pérez de Arce, businessman Ricardo Claro, journalist Cristián Zegers and historian Fernando Silva. Historian Gonzalo Vial Correa was for a time Portada's editor-in-chief.

== See also ==
- Francoist influence in Chile
