= Erik Larsen (disambiguation) =

Erik Larsen (born 1962), American comic book creator.

Erik Larsen may also refer to:

- Erik Larsen (rower) (1928–1952), Danish rower
- Erik Larsen (tennis), Danish Olympic tennis player
- Erik Otto Larsen (1931–2008), Danish novelist
- Eirik Verås Larsen (born 1976), Norwegian sprint kayaker

== See also ==
- Eric Larsen (born 1971), American Polar adventurer
- Erik Larson (disambiguation)
- Erik Larsson (disambiguation)
