= Erik Larsson =

Erik Larsson may refer to:

- Erik Larsson (athlete) (1888–1934), Swedish tug of war competitor
- Erik Larsson (ice hockey) (1905–1970), Swedish ice hockey player
- Erik Larsson (politician) (1918–2005), Swedish politician
- Erik Larsson (skier) (1912–1982), Swedish cross-country skier

== See also ==
- Erik Larson (disambiguation)
- Erik Larsen (disambiguation)
