= National Force (Chile) =

National Force Fuerza Nacional
- Leader: Raúl Meza Rodríguez
- Founded: June 17, 2019
- Dissolved: December 3, 2021
- Headquarters: Santiago, Chile
- Ideology: Pinochetism; Militarism; Anti-communism; Patriotism; National conservatism Economic liberalism Anti-LGBT; Anti-globalism
- Political position: Far-right

National Force (Spanish: Fuerza Nacional) was a Chilean political movement founded in January 2019. The movement was in a process of constitution as a political party between June 2019 and February 2020. Its current leader is Raúl Meza. On February 13, 2020, the National Electoral Service (SERVEL) terminated the party's right to register by failing to collect the necessary signatures within the time required by law. As of the end of 2020, the party - Raúl Meza in particular, following the dropping out of the race by Jacqueline Pinochet, daughter of dictator Augusto Pinochet - plans to run for office in Vitacura, one of Santiago's wealthiest suburbs.

It was a Pinochetist movement, and openly defended the work and legacy of Augusto Pinochet.
