= Time World's Top Universities =

International university ranking report

The TIME World's Top Universities ranking is a global university league table published by TIME magazine in collaboration with the international data analytics firm Statista. First issued in 2026, it represents a new entrant into the field of global higher education rankings. Despite the similarity in name, it is not connected to the Times Higher Education World University Rankings. The initiative was developed to provide an alternative assessment of universities that emphasises institutional influence, innovation, and real-world outcomes alongside traditional academic performance.

== Background and Development ==
The ranking emerged amid growing debate about how universities should be evaluated in the twenty-first century. Existing global rankings have been criticised for focusing heavily on research citations, academic reputation surveys, and internationalisation metrics, which can favour long-established institutions in wealthier countries. TIME's approach was intended to reflect a broader conception of university success, including contributions to society, the economy, and public life.

Statista, which specialises in large-scale data collection and analysis, was responsible for compiling and processing the underlying indicators. The ranking draws on a combination of institutional submissions, publicly available datasets, bibliometric databases, patent records, and surveys of academics, employers, and graduates.

== Methodology ==
The methodology incorporates a wide range of indicators grouped into several broad dimensions of performance. Academic capacity remains an important component, including measures of research output, citation impact, teaching resources, and faculty quality. However, these indicators are balanced with measures designed to capture external influence and knowledge transfer.

Innovation and economic contribution form a significant part of the assessment. Data on patents, technology licensing, industry partnerships, and start-up creation are used to evaluate how effectively universities translate research into practical applications. Institutions with strong links to industry and entrepreneurship ecosystems tend to perform well under this framework.

Global engagement is also considered, including international collaboration, cross-border research activity, and the ability to attract students and staff from overseas. This dimension reflects the increasingly international character of higher education and research networks.

A distinctive feature of the ranking is its emphasis on graduate outcomes. Indicators relating to employability, career progression, leadership positions, and influence in business, politics, science, and culture are incorporated to assess the long-term impact of alumni. This approach seeks to capture the extent to which universities produce individuals who shape society beyond academia.

== Results of the Inaugural Edition ==
In its first edition, institutions from the United Kingdom and the United States dominated the upper tiers of the table. The University of Oxford was ranked first globally, followed by several leading American universities including Yale University, Stanford University, and the Massachusetts Institute of Technology. Other prominent institutions, such as Imperial College London, also featured near the top.

The concentration of top positions among a relatively small group of elite universities reflected existing patterns of research funding, historical prestige, and global influence. Universities with strong records in scientific research, technology transfer, and leadership education performed particularly well.

=== Top 10 Universities (2026 Ranking) ===
Rank	University	Country	Total Score
1	University of Oxford	United Kingdom	90.11
2	Yale University	United States	88.47
3	Stanford University	United States	88.24
4	Massachusetts Institute of Technology	United States	87.93
5	University of Chicago	United States	87.58
6	Harvard University	United States	86.99
7	University of Cambridge	United Kingdom	86.77
8	Imperial College London	United Kingdom	86.18
9	University of Michigan	United States	84.57
10	University of Pennsylvania	United States	83.86

== Reception and Criticism ==
As a newly introduced ranking, its long-term credibility remains under evaluation. Some commentators have welcomed the attempt to broaden assessment criteria beyond purely academic measures, noting that governments and students increasingly value employability and innovation. Others have questioned the transparency of certain indicators and the difficulty of comparing outcomes across different national education systems.

There is also concern that metrics based on patents, industry income, or high-earning graduates may disadvantage universities that specialise in the humanities, social sciences, or public service professions. Differences in national labour markets and funding structures can further complicate direct comparison.

== Significance ==
The TIME World's Top Universities ranking reflects a wider shift in higher education policy and public expectations. Universities are increasingly viewed not only as centres of teaching and research but also as engines of economic growth, technological advancement, and social mobility. By incorporating measures of real-world impact, the ranking attempts to capture this expanded role.

Although it complements rather than replaces existing league tables, its publication contributes to the growing diversity of global ranking systems. Over time, its influence will depend on methodological consistency, transparency, and acceptance among students, policymakers, and academic institutions.
