= Times Higher Education–QS World University Rankings =

University rankings from 2004 to 2009

Times Higher Education–QS World University Rankings are rankings published jointly between 2004 and 2009 by Times Higher Education and Quacquarelli Symonds (QS). After QS and Times Higher Education had ended their collaboration, the methodology for these rankings continues to be used by its developer Quacquarelli Symonds. Since 2010 these rankings are known as the QS World University Rankings when Times Higher Education started publishing another ranking with methodology developed in partnership with Thomson Reuters in 2010, known as the Times Higher Education World University Rankings.

== Criticism ==
The old iterations of the rankings produced collaboratively by THE and QS Quacquarelli Symonds received a number of criticisms. Some critics expressed concern about the manner in which the peer review conducted by THE-QS was carried out. In a report, Peter Wills from the University of Auckland, New Zealand wrote of the Times Higher Education-QS World University Rankings:

But we note also that this survey establishes its rankings by appealing to university staff, even offering financial enticements to participate (see Appendix II). Staff are likely to feel it is in their greatest interest to rank their own institution more highly than others. This means the results of the survey and any apparent change in ranking are highly questionable, and that a high ranking has no real intrinsic value in any case. We are vehemently opposed to the evaluation of the University according to the outcome of such PR competitions.

Ian Diamond, former chief executive of the Economic and Social Research Council and now vice-chancellor of the University of Aberdeen and a member of the editorial board, wrote to Times Higher Education in 2007, saying:

The use of a citation database must have an impact because such databases do not have as wide a cover of the social sciences (or arts and humanities) as the natural sciences. Hence the low position of the London School of Economics, caused primarily by its citations score, is a result not of the output of an outstanding institution but the database and the fact that the LSE does not have the counterweight of a large natural science base.

== See also ==
- QS World University Rankings
- Times Higher Education World University Rankings
- THE–QS World University Rankings, 2004
- THE–QS World University Rankings, 2005
- THE–QS World University Rankings, 2006
- THE–QS World University Rankings, 2007
- THE–QS World University Rankings, 2008
- THE–QS World University Rankings, 2009
