= The Hedgehog Review =

- Discipline: Cultural studies / critical theory
- Language: English
- Edited by: Jay Tolson

Publication details
- History: 1999–present
- Publisher: Institute for Advanced Studies in Culture; University of Virginia (United States)
- Frequency: Triannually

Standard abbreviations
- ISO 4: Hedgehog Rev.

Indexing
- ISSN: 1527-9677 (print); 2324-867X (web)
- OCLC no.: 42747231

Links
- Journal homepage

The Hedgehog Review is an interdisciplinary academic journal published triannually by the Institute for Advanced Studies in Culture (IASC) at the University of Virginia.

The journal features critical writing about cultural identity, citizenship, cultural change, and cultural diversity. Each issue adopts a theme, which the articles address in the form of essays, interviews, annotated bibliographies, and the like.

The Greek lyricist Archilochus provided the inspiration for the name of the journal, when he wrote this aphorism: "The fox knows many things, but the hedgehog knows one big thing." Part of the journal's mission statement is to strive "for both the breadth of the fox and the depth of the hedgehog."
