= Erik J. Larson =

American journalist

Dr. Erik J. Larson
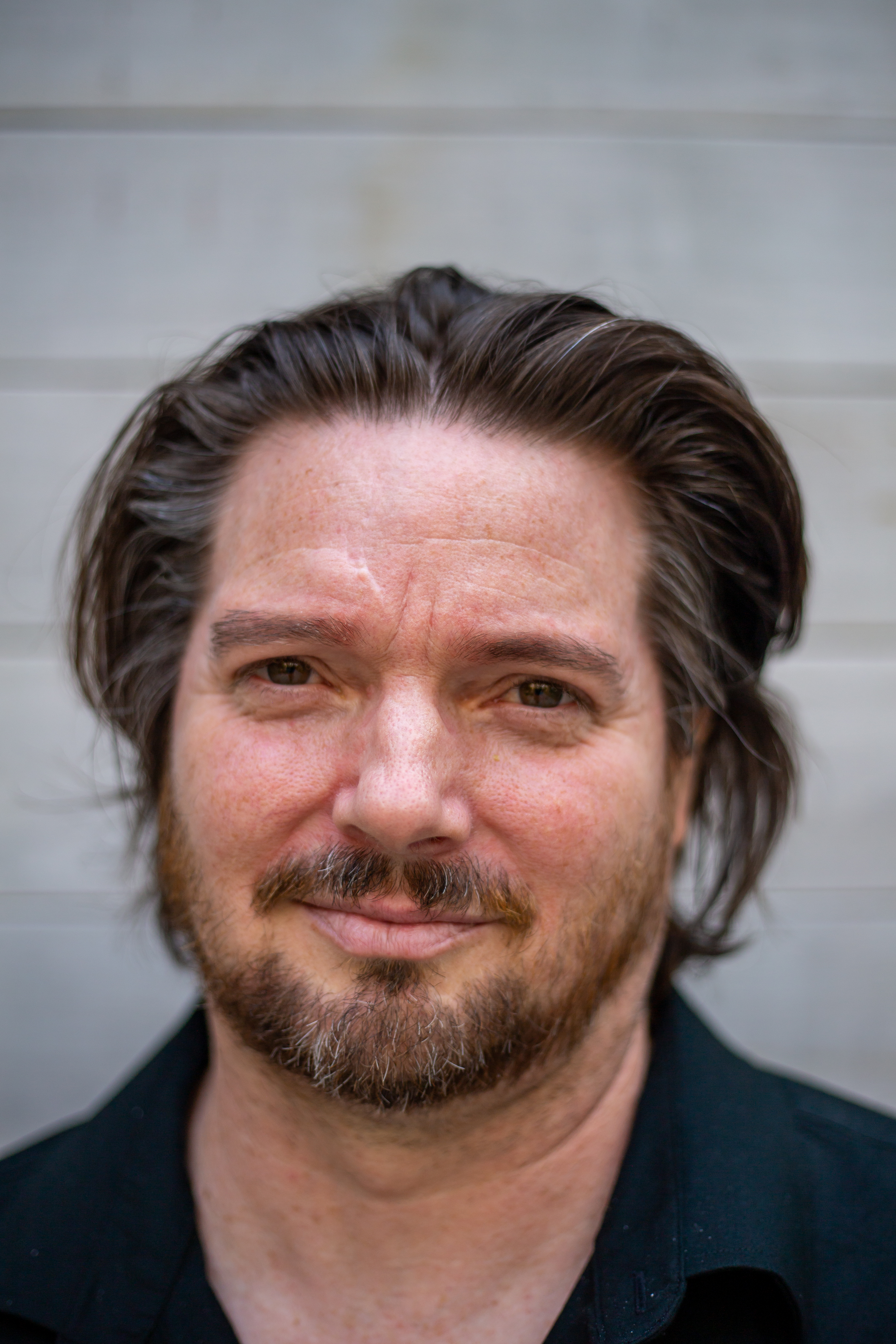
- Born: 1971 (age 54–55)
- Education: University of Texas at Austin (PhD)
- Occupations: Computer scientist, author
- Known for: Artificial intelligence, natural language processing
- Notable work: The Myth of Artificial Intelligence: Why Computers Can't Think the Way We Do
- Website: https://erikjlarson.substack.com/

Erik J. Larson (born 1971) is an American writer, tech entrepreneur, computer scientist, and Director of The Larson Institute for Intelligence and Agency. He is author of The Myth of Artificial Intelligence: Why Computers Can't Think the Way We Do. Larson is also the author of the fiction novel Benderland. His next book Augmented Human Intelligence: Empowering Minds in the Age of AI will be released on October 27, 2026.

He has written for The Atlantic, The Hedgehog Review, the Los Angeles Review of Books, Wired, and professional journals. His other projects include two DARPA-funded startups, the most recent a company that provides influence rankings for colleges and universities using an influence ranking algorithm.

Currently he publishes articles in his online newsletter Colligo.

== Education ==
Larson graduated from Whitworth University in Spokane, Washington, in 1994 as an All America Scholar Athlete. He earned a PhD in philosophy from The University of Texas at Austin in 2009, where his dissertation was a hybrid combining work in computer science, linguistics, and philosophy.

== Career ==
In the early 2000s, Larson worked for Cycorp, home of the Cyc artificial intelligence project, on a knowledge-based approach to network security. He then researched and published articles on knowledge base technology, ontology, and the Semantic Web for the Digital Media Collaboratory, a research lab founded by American businessman George Kozmetsky affiliated with the Innovation, Creativity, and Capital Institute, at The University of Texas at Austin. He founded his first company, Knexient, in 2009 with funding from DARPA to process open source text documents using his Hierarchical Document Classifier algorithm. Larson later co-founded Influence Networks after developing an algorithm to produce web-based rankings of colleges and universities with funding from DARPA. The algorithm is the foundation for the AcademicInflunce.com InfluenceRanking Engine. In 2020 Larson joined Knowledge Based Systems, Inc. in College Station, Texas, as a research scientist specializing in natural language processing.

Larson has also written articles for The Atlantic, Los Angeles Review of Books, Wired magazine, and The Hedgehog Review, as well as for The Metro Silicon Valley and Inference: International Review of Science.

Larson is a Fellow with The Institute for Advanced Studies in Culture at the University of Virginia and has also been a visiting researcher at the Santa Fe Institute.

== The Myth of Artificial Intelligence ==
Larson's book, The Myth of Artificial Intelligence: Why Computers Can't Think the Way We Do (ISBN 9780674983519 ) was published by Harvard University Press on April 6, 2021. In the book, "Larson argues that AI hype is both bad science and bad for science. A culture of invention thrives on exploring unknowns, not overselling existing methods. Inductive AI will continue to improve at narrow tasks, but if we want to make real progress, we will need to start by more fully appreciating the only true intelligence we know—our own."

In his endorsement of The Myth of Artificial Intelligence, venture capitalist Peter Thiel wrote "If you want to know about AI, read this book...it shows how a supposedly futuristic reverence for Artificial Intelligence retards progress when it denigrates our most irreplaceable resource for any future progress: our own human intelligence." The book also received endorsements from writer John Horgan and CEO of the Allen Institute for Artificial Intelligence Oren Etzioni. It has been reviewed for The Critic, Engadget, Fast Company, The Financial Times, Inside Story, The New Atlantis, The New York Review of Books, Prometheus: Critical Studies in Innovation, R&A Enterprise Architecture, Tech Monitor, TechTalks, The Times Literary Supplement, Towards Data Science, The Village Voice, The Wall Street Journal, and The Wire India.

Although the book remained largely unknown after its 2016 self-publication, in late 2025 Larson began publicly describing Benderland as the conceptual prequel to The Myth of Artificial Intelligence, noting on his Substack that the latter was originally drafted under the working title Machineland.

== Post-Myth Publications ==
Larson wrote "Back to the Fifties: Reassessing Technological and Political Progress," published in the American Affairs Journal. His article "Who's Smarter: AI or a 5-Year-Old?" appeared in Nautius, "Why Human Intelligence Thrives Where Machines Fail" in Metro Silicon Valley, and "Why Smart Cities are a Dumb Idea" in UnHerd. Larson also reviewed the book Mindless: The Human Condition in the Age of Artificial Intelligence by Robert Skidelsky as well as The AI Con: How to Fight Big Tech's Hype and Create the Future We Want by Emily M. Bender and Alex Hannafor the Los Angeles Review of Books. With Andrew Trousdale, Larson authored the article "Scrolling Alone" for Johnathan Haidt's After Babel Substack. Larson discussed the piece in an interview for the RNZ Life and Society podcast.

== Podcasts, Interviews, and Invited Talks ==
Larson has also performed several media interviews and made conference appearances in relation to The Myth of Artificial Intelligence, such as on the Lawfare and Current Affairs podcasts, and COSM 2021. Larson has been an invited speaker for numerous events, including meetings of the Dakota Humanities Council and the American Swiss Foundation.

He has appeared in other media to discuss a range of technological and social issues. Larson spoke about his "Back to the Fifties" article on the Keen On show. He also participated in the El Podcast, John Horgan's podcast at the Stevens Institute of Technology, the UNICAMP podcast for the Instituto de Computação, the Academic Influence podcast, and John Swope podcast. Larson also hosted his own Myths and Problems podcast.

== Colligo ==
In August 2023, Larson launched the newsletter Colligo to "show the problems with our data-driven world and show or assemble a richer humanistic picture." On the site, Larson revealed he "was awarded a two-year grant by the Thiel Foundation to work on a second book."

In January 2025, Larson announced that he had received a contract from MIT Press for his next book, co-authored with VC investor Chee-We Ng, Augmented Human Intelligence: Empowering Minds in the Age of AI. This title will be released on October 27, 2026.

== The Larson Institute for Intelligence and Agency ==
Larson founded The Larson Institute for Intelligence and Agency in September 2026. The Institute will be a forum for "Ideas and research on artificial intelligence, human intelligence, and the future of agency." The site also servers as a home for some of his current writing and research.

== Benderland ==
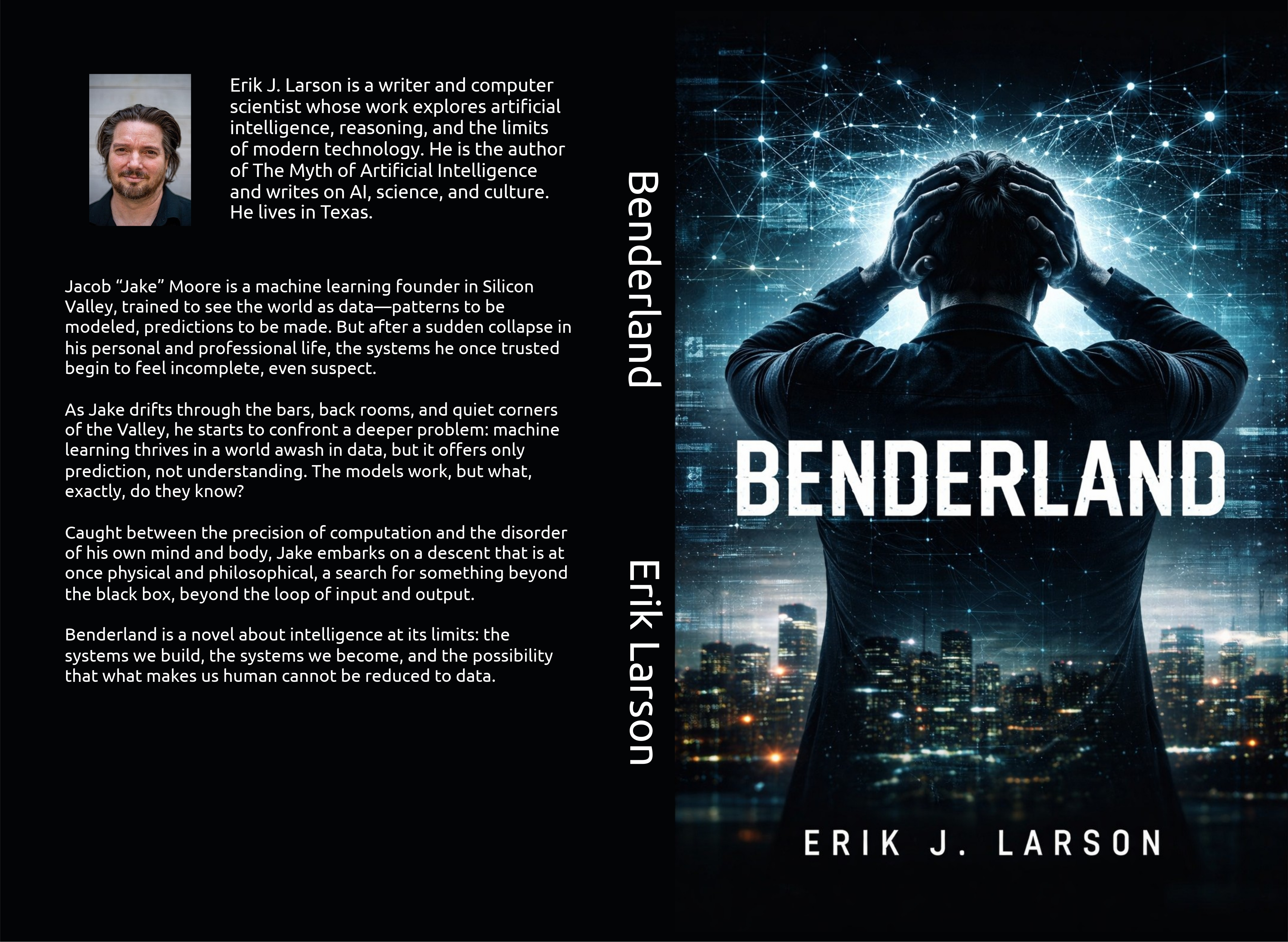
Cover for Benderland (2016) by Erik J. Larson.

Benderland is a novel by Erik J. Larson set in Silicon Valley and Northern California during the early 2010s. The novel follows Jake Moore, an AI entrepreneur navigating personal dislocation during the rapid expansion of data-driven technology companies. The narrative is episodic, moving through bars, startups, travel, and nightlife, blending fictional narrative with elements drawn from the culture of the tech industry. A central concept in the novel is "Machineland," a term used by the protagonist to describe a social and psychological condition shaped by optimization, prediction, and data-driven systems. "Machineland" is portrayed both as an external technological environment and as an internalized mode of thinking influenced by efficiency, quantification, and algorithmic logic. The theme parallels broader critiques of technological modernity, including ideas associated with Paul Kingsnorth, who describes "the Machine" as extending into human perception and identity. The novel contrasts this condition with attempts at escape through hedonism and personal experience, which are depicted as both liberating and self-destructive.

== Other Projects ==
Larson publishes Way Out Magazine, a quarterly magazine organized around the idea of “autonomy without isolation.” Loosely inspired by Stewart Brand's Whole Earth Catalog, Way Out applies a similar ethos to the contemporary era. Its coverage includes a variety of topics such as technology, travel, adventure, self-reliance, gear, literature, and cartoons. A central recurring theme of the publication is the use of small-scale technology to increase personal autonomy, which it positions as an alternative to adapting to increasingly centralized digital and social systems.

In 2020, Larson launched Erik Travels the World, a travel and photography website. The initial iteration of the site primarily archived photographs and written material documenting his international travels between 2017 and 2019. In 2026, Larson initiated a significant rebuild and expansion of the platform with the intention of documenting ongoing and future travels. The website is thematically and operationally linked to the travel and adventure coverage featured in Way Out Magazine.
