= Hermógenes Pérez de Arce Lopetegui =

Chilean politician and journalist

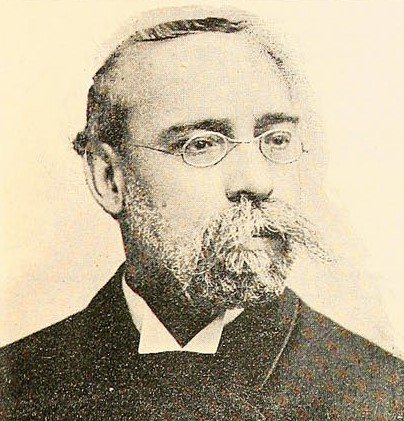
Hermógenes Pérez de Arce Lopetegui

Hermógenes Pérez de Arce Lopetegui (April 19, 1845 – August 26, 1902) was a Chilean politician, teacher and journalist. He was Ministry of Finance under two presidents: from 1885 to 1886 under president Domingo Santa Maria and from 1895 to 1896 under president Jorge Montt.

| Preceded by Pedro Nolasco Gandarillas | Minister of Finance of Chile; 1885–1886 | Succeeded by Agustín Edwards Ross |
| Preceded by | Minister of Finance of Chile; 1895–1896 | Succeeded by |
