= AméricaEconomía =

Latin American magazine

AmericaEconomía
- Categories: Economy
- Country: Chile
- Website: www.americaeconomia.com

AméricaEconomía is a Latin American magazine founded in 1986 by Chilean Elías Selman and Swede Nils Strandberg. The magazine's headquarters are in Lima, Peru.

== Beginning ==
In the 1980s, what some analysts consider an economically "lost decade" in Latin America, Selman and Strandberg decided to start a Latin American business magazine.

Since 1986, AméricaEconomía has been analysing business, economics and finance news in Latin America. It is published monthly in Spanish and Portuguese. The editors and journalists of the magazine are stationed in Santiago, Buenos Aires, Lima, Bogotá, Mexico City, São Paulo, and Miami. The magazine is also supported by a network of correspondents around the world who cover international business from a Latin American perspective.

Since 1993, AméricaEconomía has conducted research on topics of interest to senior executives and entrepreneurs from Latin America.
