= Qué Pasa (magazine) =

Chilean magazine

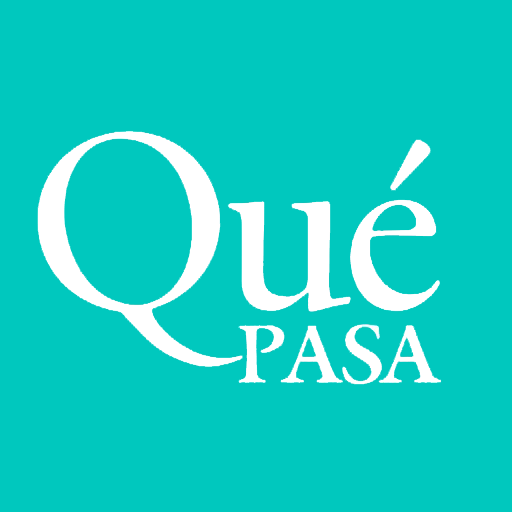
Qué Pasa logotype.

Qué Pasa (Spanish: What's Happening?) was a print lifestyle and news magazine published in Santiago, Chile. Founded in 1971, the magazine became an online publication from May 2018.

== History and profile ==
Qué Pasa began publication in 1971. The magazine is owned by Copesa. It was published by Empresa Periodística La Tercera, S.A. in Spanish weekly on Fridays. The headquarters of the weekly is in Santiago. It has a right-wing political stance.

In May 2018 Grupo Copesa which owns Qué Pasa announced that the print edition of the magazine folded and that it became an online-only publication.

== See also ==
- Portada (magazine)
