= Blest =

Blest may refer to:

- Alberto Blest Gana (1830–1920), a Chilean novelist and diplomat
- Clotario Blest Riffo (1899–1990), a Chilean trade union leader and social activist
- William Cunningham Blest, an Irish doctor, president of the first Medical Society of Chile
- Puerto Blest, a village and municipality in Río Negro Province in Argentina
