= Guillermo =

- Pronunciation: /ɡiˈʎeɾmo/
- Gender: Male
- Language: Spanish

Origin
- Origin: Germanic
- Meaning: "Vehement protector"

Other names
- Related names: William, Guillaume, Wilhelm, Guilherme

Guillermo (Spanish pronunciation: [ɡiˈʎeɾmo]) is the Spanish form of the male given name William. The name is also commonly shortened to Guille.

== People ==
- Guillermo Amador (1974–), American musician
- Guillermo Amor (1967–), Spanish footballer
- Guillermo Arévalo (1952–), a Shipibo shaman and curandero (healer) of the Peruvian Amazon (Shipibo: Kestenbetsa)
- Guillermo Barros Schelotto (1973–), Argentine footballer
- Guillermo Bermejo (1975–), Peruvian politician
- Guillermo C. Blest (1800–1884), Anglo-Irish physician settled in Chile
- Guillermo Cañas, Argentine tenniser
- Guillermo Cañedo, Mexican businessman and football executive
- Guillermo Chong, Chilean geologist
- Guillermo Coria, Argentine tenniser
- Guillermo Dávila, Venezuelan actor and singer
- Guillermo Díaz (actor) (1975–), American actor of Cuban descent
- Guillermo Diaz (basketball), Puerto Rican basketballer for the Los Angeles Clippers
- Guillermo del Toro, Mexican filmmaker, screenwriter, producer, author, actor, former special effects artist
- Guillermo Díaz (1979–), Uruguayan footballer
- Guillermo Díaz (1930–1997), Chilean footballer
- Guillermo Eleazar, Filipino police officer
- Guillermo Endara (1936–2009), Panamanian President, 1989–1994
- Guillermo Fernández (disambiguation), several people
- Guillermo Galván Galván, Mexican Army General
- Guillermo Garcia (disambiguation), several people
  - Guillermo García López, Spanish tennis player and coach
- Guillermo Willie Hernández (1954–2023), Puerto Rican baseball player
- Guillermo Willie Hernandez, Filipino former amateur tennis player
- Guillermo Lasso (1955–), Ecuadorian businessman and President of Ecuador, 2021–2023
- Guillermo Mac Millan (1940/1941–), Chilean urologist
- Guillermo Marquez, (fictional character) one of the two baby twin siblings of Dora in Dora the Explorer
- Guillermo Morphy, Spanish aristocrat and musicologist
- Guillermo Muñoz (disambiguation), several people
- Guillermo Novo, Cuban exile and militant
- Guillermo Ochoa, Mexican footballer
- Guillermo Pallomari, Chilean accountant and Cali Cartel member
- Guillermo Rawson (1821–1890), Argentine doctor and politician
- Guillermo Rigondeaux, Cuban boxer
- Guillermo Rodríguez, Spanish archer
- Guillermo Rodríguez, Venezuelan baseball player
- Guillermo Rodríguez, Uruguayan footballer
- Guillermo Rodríguez Lara, Ecuadorian politician
- Guillermo Rodriguez, Mexican-American studio security officer and sidekick for Jimmy Kimmel Live! (television show)
- Guillermo Solá, Chilean distance runner
- Guillermo Torrez, Bolivian politician
- Guillermo Vilas, Argentine tenniser
- Guillermo Viviani (1893–1964), Chilean Roman Catholic priest and trade unionist
- Luis Guillermo Madrigal Gutiérrez, athlete

== See also ==
- Hurricane Guillermo
