= Colegio Nuestra Señora de Andacollo =

Catholic school in Santiago, Chile

Coordinates: 33°25′54″S 70°40′12″W

Colegio Nuestra Señora de Andacollo is a Catholic primary and secondary school administered by the Congregation of Holy Cross since 1976 in Santiago, Chile. It was founded by the Archdiocese of Santiago in 1904. The school is dedicated to "Our Lady of Andacollo" (Spanish: Nuestra Señora de Andacollo), also known as the "Virgin of Andacollo" (Spanish: Virgen de Andacollo), a celebrated Catholic image of the Virgin Mary.

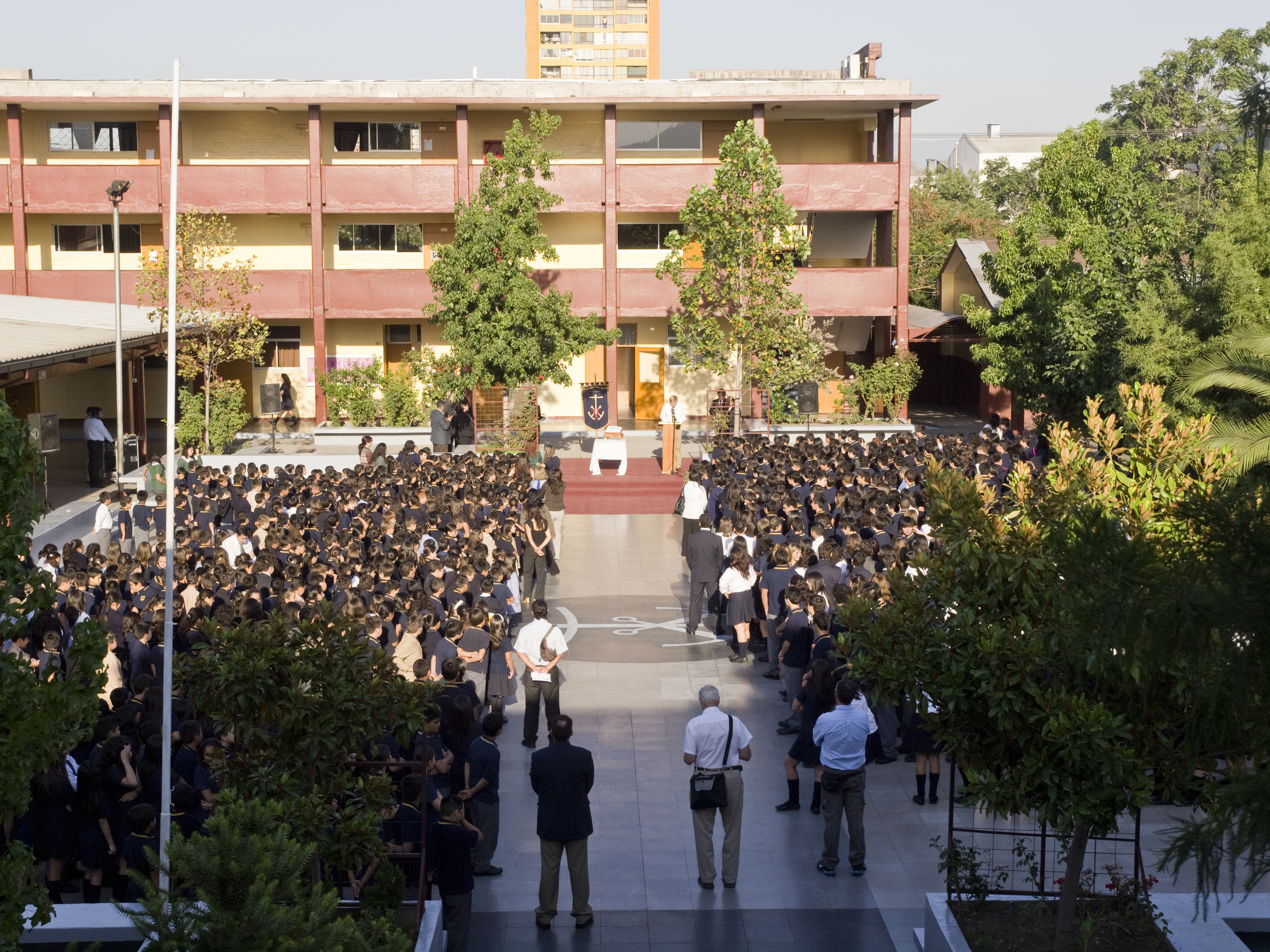
First day of classes, 2011.

== Founding ==
The history of Andacollo Parish School originates in the beginning of the 20th century in the midst many social questions. In the midst of a poor neighborhood on the outskirts of then Santiago, full of tenements and house of ill-repute, was lifted the tower of a chapel that shared the same land as the Confraternity of Saint Vincent Ferrer. The Confraternity decided to destine the land for the construction of a sanctuary and a school for children that the priest of that era dedicated to Our Lady of Andacollo (Nuestra Señora de Andacollo).

In spite of always counting on the support of persons of good will, the economic highs and lows from the beginning of the school's history endangered the institution's future. Hence, those around it have transformed a small school into something much larger.

The school opened in a simple for in 1904, teaching literacy to the young boys of the neighborhood. Thus, the cornerstone was laid in 1906 of what would become the Sanctuary of Andacollo, under the direction of Rev. Ladislao Godoy, who would later be known as "el Cura de Andacollo" (the priest of Andacollo).

In the following year, some enthusiastic youth founded the first "Patronato de Andacollo." As this building acquired increasing importance, the archbishop of Santiago erected it formally as a parish in June 1912., appointing Rev. Godoy as the first pastor. In that same year, Miguel Covarrubias Valdés took the helm of the school, seeking those who wanted to help him with the work.

The plan for the Patronato was always clear from the start. The idea was: "To take the child from the first years in school, provide a Christian education and a practical instruction, without disregard for the catechesis and sports on Sundays. The young person will not be abandoned after graduation with the creation of an alumni organization and a worker's center. The goal is to improve the neighborhood morally and materially and to promote hygiene and savings and to establish, as possible, organizations and unions."

Thus, in rapid succession a variety of organizations were formed that accompanied not only the Christian formation of the child but also of the entire family. To that end, in 1911, the "Protective Union of Andacollo" was formed as a mutual benefit society, the "St. Vincent DePaul Society was formed with organizations for both men and women in 1915, a Sunday school was launched in 1916, and a worker's center was formed in 1930.

The oldest attendance registry of the school dates covers the period from 1915 to 1919, with teacher Felix Berrios Bustamante, who was later named rector in 1919.

== Changes in the Colegio ==
The neighborhood around the parish and colegio was very porr. In that period, streets were not paved and many houses of "ill repute" populated the neighborhood. Hence, the patronato exercised a positive influence in the community, and the school was one of the best examples, since "the kids did not go about so dirty and all of them had shoes."

The school began to need analytic programs in conformity with the "modern" pedagogy of the day. Thus, Aniceto Gallardo, director of the school "Escuela Olea," successfully implemented these reforms.

== Formation of a Saint ==
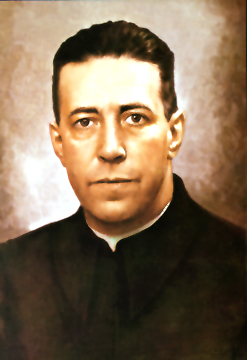

In 1913, the parish school had 180 students. That year, a night school was opened in addition to the day school, given that so many students worked during the day. During this same period, a student from a prestigious Jesuit school, San Ignacio, volunteered at the parish and school. That student worked in the office, as librarian, and as banker for the parish's students and its worker center. This student later enrolled in law school, focus on labor law, before entering the seminary with the Jesuits. Today, he is known as St. Alberto Hurtado. St. Alberto Hurtado was a champion of youth and the poor. His ministry with both began at Andacollo.

== See also ==
- Parroquia Nuestra Señora de Andacollo, Santiago
- Our Lady of Andacollo

== Bibliography ==
- Official website of Colegio Nuestra Señora de Andacollo
- Official website of the Congregation of Holy Cross in Chile
- Urtubia Cornejo, C.S.C., Jorge, "Una Historia para Recordar," 2008.
- Report from the Chilean Ministry of Education about the Colegio
- Fuentes Vásquez, Héctor, "Recuerdos de un Andacollino Agradecido," 2003.
- "Memoria del Patronato de Andacollo (1912-1918)"
