= Gonzalo Vial Correa =

Chilean historian, lawyer and journalist

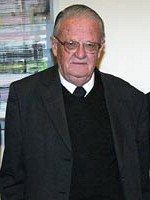

Education Minister of Chile
- In office 26 December 1978 – 14 December 1979
- President: Augusto Pinochet
- Preceded by: Luis Niemann Núñez
- Succeeded by: Alfredo Prieto Bafalluy

Personal details
- Born: 29 August 1930 Santiago, Chile
- Died: 30 October 2009 (aged 79) Santiago, Chile
- Spouse: María Luisa
- Children: 7
- Education: Pontifical Catholic University of Chile
- Profession: Lawyer, historian, and journalist

Gonzalo Vial Correa (29 August 1930 – 30 October 2009) was a Chilean historian, lawyer and journalist. He was a member of the State Defense Council and the Council on Ethics in Social Media. In addition he was president of the Barnechea Foundation for Education, which he founded with his wife, María Luisa Vial Cox.

In 2005, Vial was voted the most influential intellectual in Chile by 112 Chilean scholars and politicians. In August 2010 the Faculty of History at Finis Terrae University instituted a prize bearing his name.

Despite this recognition, Gonzalo Vial has been widely criticized for his work White Book on the Change of Government in Chile, written immediately after the 1973 Chilean coup d'état and supervised by Admiral Patricio Carvajal, which described the so-called "Plan Zeta". Plan Zeta disseminated the false idea that left-wing elements were organizing a self-coup against President Salvador Allende and the Unidad Popular, and for years this was the main justification of the coup and subsequent establishment of a military government. Under the pretense of countering Plan Zeta, the DINA arrested, tortured, and murdered many people.

== Biography ==
Gonzalo Vial Correa was the fourth child of six born of Wenceslao Vial Ovalle and Ana Correa Sánchez, and his brother was the doctor Juan de Dios Vial Correa. He went to school at Sacred Hearts School and after this he studied law at the Pontifical Catholic University of Chile, graduating in 1957 and receiving the Tocornal Prize which is awarded to the best law student from each graduating class. At the same time he studied the history of education and some of his mentors in this field were Jaime Eyzaguirre, Mario Góngora and Ricardo Krebs.

=== Professional activities ===
Vial taught in the Pontifical Catholic University of Chile's Faculty of Law and in its Faculty of Sociology. He had also served as Dean of History, Geography, and Arts at the Metropolitan University of Educational Sciences and Dean of the Faculty of Education at Finis Terrae University.

During the second administration of President Carlos Ibáñez del Campo, Vial was private secretary to Finance Minister Jorge Prat.

=== Journalism and works of history ===
Vial was a full member of the Royal Academy of History and of the Chilean Academy of History, which had awarded him the Miguel Cruchaga Prize. A disciple of Jaime Eyzaguirre, Vial was an exponent of conservative historiography and his work was criticized by leftist historians such as the new social historians who accused him of being excessively supportive of Chilean governments and of only telling the story of the elites.

Vial's masterpiece is his History of Chile (1891-1973), an attempt to continue the history of Chile written by Francisco Antonio Encina which concluded in the year 1891. He begins this work with a criticism of the development of Chile and of the total incompetence of the whole political class, especially the legislature, in the era between the suicide of two presidents. His final book notes that the country needs political consensus on how to construct itself. The work never received the National Prize for History.

Vial was also a professional journalist. He was co-founder of the magazines Portada and Qué Pasa. As a columnist for the daily newspaper La Segunda he strongly criticized the governments of the Concertación for their educational policies and their so-called "agenda of values". For years he supported increasing educational grants for the country's poorest people.

=== Military rule and human rights ===
After the military coup of 1973, Vial participated in writing the White Book on the Change of Government in Chile, which denounced the alleged existence of the so-called "Plan Zeta", a fabrication by the military of a plan made by leftist groups prior to the military coup to launch a self-coup and to exterminate opposition leaders and high-ranking commanders of the Chilean Armed Forces. The existence of Plan Zeta was later called into question and Gonzalo Vial was criticized for having helped to write the White Book. According to the Valech Report, the contents of the White Book were pure political propaganda and an excuse to justify the coup. Vial, on the other hand, insisted that documents relating to Plan Zeta were genuine, pointing out that the Revolutionary Left Movement itself had publicly proposed a coup d'état and a dictatorship of the proletariat with the support of willing factions within the military. Vial also stated that the military itself did not immediately agree to make the existence of the plan public on the grounds that they were still investigating it, which indicates that the military did not intend for it to be propaganda.

Between 1978 and 1979 he was Education Minister in the military government led by Augusto Pinochet, though he was dismissed from his post abruptly. Some suspected freemasons of being behind his sudden replacement, due to his Catholic faith and his connections with the Pontifical Catholic University of Chile.

During Pinochet's dictatorship, Vial publicly criticized the human rights situation in the country. After Chile made the transition to democracy, Vial joined the Truth and Reconciliation Commission, which would produce the Rettig Report, in order to counterbalance the leftist-leaning members of the commission. He also took part in the Round-Table Discussion of 1999 to 2000, but did not sign the final declaration because he felt that it did nothing to further the objective of the undertaking, which was to find the bodies of people who had been "disappeared" by the regime.

== Works ==
- Historia de Chile (1891-1973) (ISBN 956-12-1429-6), 6 volumes published:
  - La sociedad chilena en el cambio de siglo (1891-1920) ISBN 956-12-1168-8
  - Triunfo y decadencia de la oligarquía (1891- 1920) ISBN 956-12-1169-6
  - Arturo Alessandri y los golpes militares (1920-1925) ISBN 956-12-1170-X
  - La dictadura de Ibáñez (1925-1931) ISBN 956-12-1201-3
  - De la república socialista al frente popular (1931-1938) ISBN 956-12-1403-2
- Pinochet, la biografía ISBN 956-239-233-3
- Arturo Prat ISBN 956-13-1306-5
- Salvador Allende: El fracaso de una ilusión ISBN 956-8147-09-8
- Chile, cinco siglos de historia; desde los primeros pobladores prehispánicos hasta el año 2006. 2 Volumes. ISBN 978-956-12-2014-0

Coauthor of:

- El senado de Chile
- Balmaceda y la guerra civil
- La Sudamericana de Vapores
- Jorge Alessandri Rodríguez, una biografía
- Jaime Eyzaguirre y su época
