= Historia (history of the Americas journal) =

- Discipline: History
- Language: Spanish
- Edited by: Rafael Sagredo Baeza

Publication details
- History: 1961-present
- Publisher: Pontifical Catholic University of Chile (Chile)
- Frequency: Biannual

Standard abbreviations
- ISO 4: Historia (Santiago)

Indexing
- ISSN: 0717-7194

Links
- Journal homepage

Historia is a peer-reviewed academic journal specialising in the history of the Americas and Chile. It was established in 1961 and its first director was Jaime Eyzaguirre. The first editorial committee included Ricardo Krebs, Gonzalo Vial, Gabriel Guarda, Armando de Ramón, Julio González and Carlos Oviedo. Javier González acted as secretary. Apart from original articles, the journal includes a bibliography of any history publication about Chile or written by a Chilean in the period that precedes the journal deem relevant.
