= Fernando Vives =

Chilean Jesuit (1871–1935)

- Born: 24 March 1871
- Died: 21 September 1935 (aged 64)
- Notable work: Advocate of Catholic social teaching in Chile
- Religion: Jesuit

Fernando Vives Solar (1871–1935) was a Chilean Jesuit known as one of the foremost advocates of the Catholic social teachings in Chile. Vives influenced a generation of young men including Alberto Hurtado, Clotario Blest and future historian Jaime Eyzaguirre. His advocacy for social questions was not well received among the conservative elites who forced Vives to leave the country in 1918 for an exile in Spain until 1931 when he returned to Chile.

== Early life ==
Fernando Vives Solar was born to Daniel Vives Pomar and Esther del Solar Quiroga. He was one of nine children and occupied the fourth position among them. He received his education at the Instituto Nacional and later entered the Faculty of Law at the University of Chile. However, due to financial difficulties faced by his family, he was unable to complete his law degree.

== Religious Life ==
In 1896, he joined the Seminario Conciliar de Santiago with the goal of becoming a priest. The following year, he entered the Society of Jesus (Jesuits) and underwent formation mainly in Argentina and Spain. After studying classical humanities, philosophy, and theology, he was ordained as a priest in July 1908. In the subsequent year, he returned to Chile and served as a history teacher at the Colegio San Ignacio and as the director of the Congregación Mariana.

During this period, Chile was grappling with the social question, and Vives decided to serve the workers while applying the encyclical Rerum novarum. His approach was met with resistance from more traditional sectors of the Church, leading to his transfer to Córdoba, Argentina, in 1912.

While in Córdoba, Vives established various organizations, including an orphanage, a company for building affordable housing for workers, and social study circles. He returned to Colegio San Ignacio in 1915, resuming his role as a history teacher. It was during this time that he met Alberto Hurtado, Manuel Larraín, and Clotario Blest, who were students at the college. Vives had a significant influence on the thinking of these individuals, particularly in matters related to working for the welfare of laborers.

In the years that followed, he played a crucial role in the creation of the drivers' union in Santiago and the milk delivery workers' union. In 1917, he formed a social secretariat to attend to workers and their institutions, which led to the formation of more labor unions. He was also invited by José María Caro to Iquique, where he organized the city's first Social Week. However, his social work once again led to his forced transfer out of Chile in January 1918.

Vives was transferred to Buenos Aires and later to Spain. During his time in Europe, he traveled to various European cities, studying the Social Doctrine of the Church and workers' organizations. In Spain, he directed the Asociación de San Rafael para los Inmigrantes and the Asociación Iberoamericana de Jóvenes Católicos, and he contributed to the establishment of the Juventud Católica Obrera de España. He also served as a delegate for Spain in the immigration section of the International Labour Office of the League of Nations.

Throughout his stay in Europe, he maintained contact with his disciples in Chile, especially Alberto Hurtado.

Vives returned to Chile in 1931 after the expulsion of the Jesuits from Spain. He joined the Catholic Action of Chile, participated in the founding of various organizations, including the Unión de Trabajadores Católicos (Union of Catholic Workers), the Instituto de Propagandistas (Institute of Propagandists), and the Círculo Sacerdotal de Estudios Sociales (Priestly Circle of Social Studies). He also collaborated in public lectures and social events.

Another notable achievement during this period was the founding of the Liga Social de Jóvenes (Social League of Youth), which aimed to promote the social teachings of the Church. Members included Clotario Blest, Jaime Larraín García Moreno, Pablo Larraín Tejada, and Carlos Vergara. It also received support from some members of the National Association of Catholic Students (ANEC). In 1933, the episcopate ordered young members of the Social League and ANEC to join the Conservative Party. Vives criticized this decision, believing that young people should have the freedom to choose. The following year, Cardinal Eugenio Pacelli, the future Pope Pius XII, issued a letter affirming the freedom of Catholics to choose their political party, effectively separating the Conservative Party from the Church.

== Later years ==
In his final years, Vives was detached from some of the organizations he had been involved with, including the Liga de Acción Sacerdotal (League of Priestly Action), Catholic Action, and the Social Secretariat of the Clergy. Opponents of the priest gathered signatures for his removal from Chile, but his death prevented the implementation of such a measure.
