= Jaime Eyzaguirre =

Chilean lawyer, essayist and historian

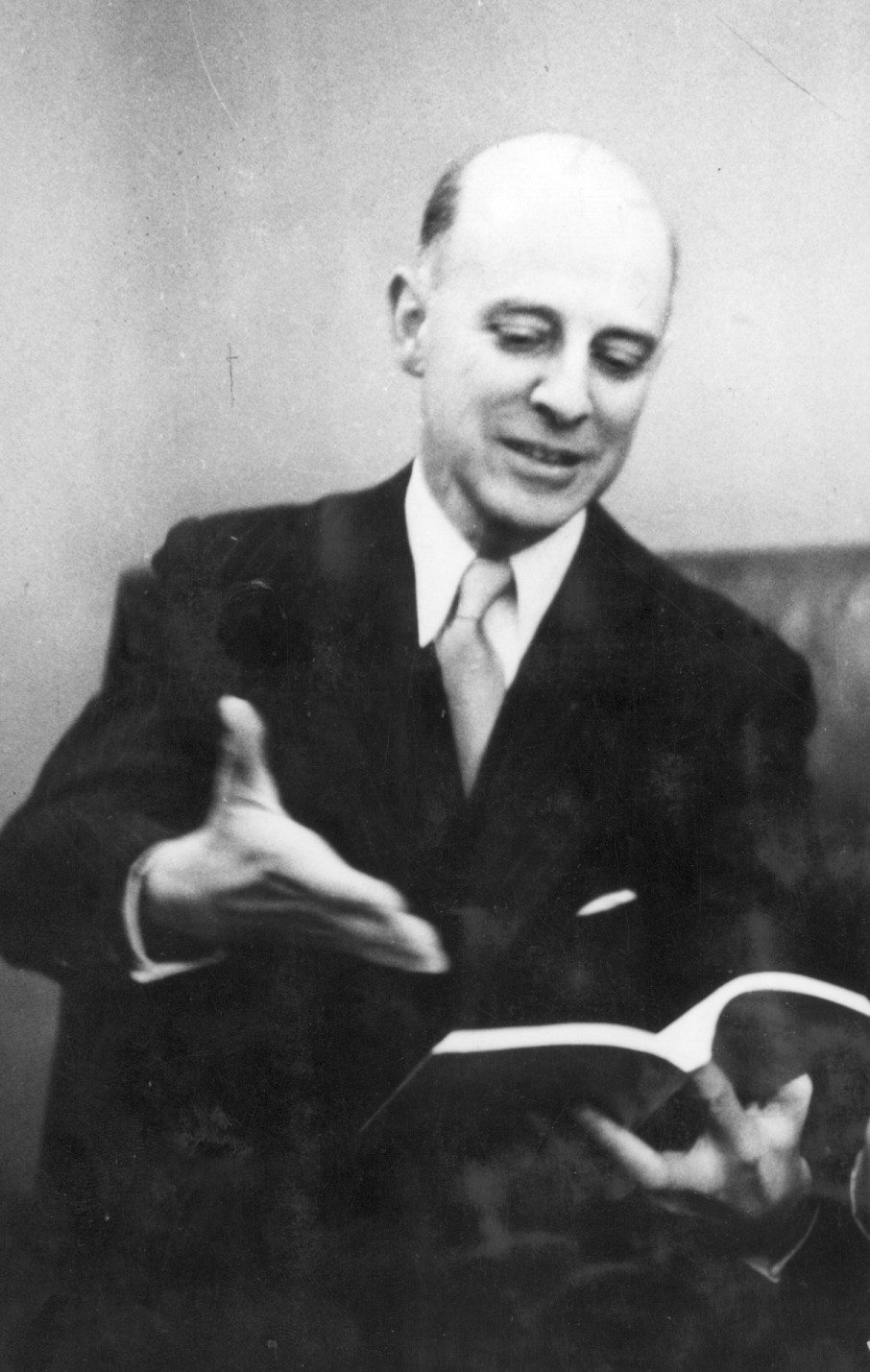
- Born: 21 December 1908; Santiago, Chile
- Died: 17 September 1968 (aged 59)
- Awards: Order of Isabella the Catholic; Order of Merit of the Federal Republic of Germany; Civil Order of Alfonso X, the Wise
- Scientific career
- Fields: History of Chile, Hispanic studies
- Notable students: Gabriel Guarda; Jaime Guzmán; Armando de Ramón; Ricardo Lagos

Jaime Eyzaguirre (21 December 1908 – 17 September 1968) was a Chilean lawyer, essayist and historian. He is variously recognized as a writer of Spanish traditionalist or conservative (Note: This label groups Eyzaguirre with other Chilean historians considered conservative such as Alberto Edwards, Francisco Antonio Encina and Mario Góngora.) historiography in his country.

== Early life and marriage ==
Eyzaguirre was born into a religious upper-class family in Santiago. As young man he studied law in the Pontifical Catholic University of Chile (PUC) and was member of the Catholic student organization Asociación Nacional de Estudiantes Católicos. (Note: Most students of the university were members of this organization. Including Eyzaguirre's contemporaries like Alberto Hurtado, Clotario Blest, Eduardo Frei and Mario Góngora.) During his studies he was influenced by the Jesuit Fernando Vives and the writings of Manuel Lacunza.

Eyzaguirre started to court Adriana Philippi (Note: Adriana came from a family of scientists. Her paternal grandfather was Federico Philippi son of Rodolfo Amando Philippi both of whom were naturalists. Her maternal grandfather was Vicente Izquierdo, a physician, botanist and entomologist. The father of Adriana, Julio Philippi Bihl, was a lawyer, economist and politician. She was Catholic as Julio Philippi was a Catholic convert from Lutheranism.) in 1929 and married her in 1934.

== Essayist, historian and teacher ==
The PUC founded its Pedagogy School (Escuela de Pedagogía) in 1943 and contracted Eyzaguirre to be in charge of the History of Chile (Historia de Chile) classes. Most of the students of the time were priests, nuns and brothers. He was assisted by Mario Góngora is some classes. Apart from this part-time work Eyzaguirre was also part-time teacher at Liceo Alemán.

At the Pedagogy School, Eyzaguirre met Ricardo Krebs, who was also history teacher but had rather few contacts, and introduced him to the Catholic intellectual elite of Santiago. His salary is reported to have been low at PUC, and when "raised., it mostly had to do with the currency inflation that was experienced in Chile. Nevertheless, he was allowed to rent a small local owned by the Archbishopric of Santiago at a relatively low price. Here, Eyzaguirre ran a small bookshop called El Arbol until the late 1950s when it was closed. Despite his economic hardships he twice refused to be assigned ambassador to Spain. Eyzaguirre thought any diplomatic work he did would need to compete with his work as historian and therefore he would not be able to accomplish a dedicated work in diplomacy. At the same time, the writings of Léon Bloy provided him with comfort about his economic hardship.

=== Evaluation of Spain in the Americas ===
His cultural and ethnic evaluation of Spanish colonization of the Americas and mestizo result:

Because of that the Spaniard is not yet another element in the ethnic conglomerate. He is the decisive factor, the only one that could attract them all... Because of this any attempt to forget the Spanish name in these lands and oppose to him a hyperbolic renewed value of the indigenous, would go straight to attack the lifeblood that unite our peoples. Anything worthy that the ancient civilizations could have had at the moment of decadence when they faced the Spanish conquest was saved and defended by the Spaniards themselves who took with them just in time the instrument of writing, unknown to the indigenous peoples, to perpetuate the history and the traditions of the conquered ones. Whatever the Spaniards destroyed was not comparable with what they contributed with in terms of culture.

=== O'Higgins and Spain ===
A milestone in the work of Eyzaguirre was his essay O'Higgins, which won a prize in 1946 to commemorate the centenary of the death of Bernardo O'Higgins. It was the first written work that granted Eyzaguirre some income. The reward helped Eyzaguirre to finance a trip to Spain in 1947. The seven-month journey reinforced his leanings for Spanish heritage in his historiography. In Spain, Eyzaguirre held a course on Chilean political and constitutional history at Universidad Central de Madrid. His stay in Spain made him target of attacks in Chile from those critical of Francoist Spain, in particular from people associated with the National Falange party (not to be confused with the Spanish movement). Personally, Eyzaguirre admired the stoic stance of the isolated Francoist Spain against both Soviet and Western pressure but never propagandised for Francoist Spain in Chile.

=== Back in Chile ===
For a time he was teacher of Jaime Guzmán. When the journal Historia was established in 1961 Eyzaguirre served as its first director.

Generally Eyzaguirre dealt with similar topics as Lewis Hanke. He despised 19th-century writers such as José Victorino Lastarria and Domingo Faustino Sarmiento because he considered they "ruptured" the historical links to Spain and characterized their views as "apostasy".

The work of Eyzaguirre was criticized by left-wing historians. Mario Céspedes said in reference to Eyzaguirre's writings on the conquest of Chile that the conquest was a search for Indian labourers and "not a chivalrous journey". On the essay O'Higgins, Céspedes wrote that it lacked "the social and economic causes of the facts". The Marxist Julio César Jobet made a harsher criticism by accusing Eyzaguirre of "exalting backward doctrines and institutions" and undermining the influence of "French rationalist and critical thought in the development and progress of Chile".

Writing in 1979 Sergio Villalobos and co-workers characterized Eyzaguirre as "a kind of crusader" that tended to "deform" history. Thus they argued he was a representative of Pink legend historiography. The same authors also posit that he owed his prestige to his humble lifestyle, spruced writing and tragic death rather than to his contributions to historiography.

== Major works ==
- Ventura de Pedro de Valdivia (1942)
- O'Higgins (1946)
- Hispanoamérica del dolor (1947)
- Fisonomía histórica de Chile (1948)
- Ideario y ruta de la emancipación chilena y Chile durante el gobierno de Errázuriz Echaurren (1957)
- Historia del Derecho (1959)
- Chile y Bolivia, esquema de un proceso diplomático (1963)
- Historia de Chile (1965)
- Historia de las instituciones políticas y sociales de Chile (1966)
- Breve historia de las fronteras de Chile (1967)
