= Guile =

Guile or Guilé may refer to:

== Fictional characters ==
- Guile (Street Fighter), a video game character from the Street Fighter series
- Guile, a video game character from Chrono Cross

== People ==
- Daniel Guile (1814–1882), British trade unionist
- Melanie Guile (born 1949), Australian writer

== Other uses ==
- Deception, and astuteness
- GNU Guile, an implementation of the Scheme programming language
- Guile Island, Antarctica
- Guilé Foundation, a Swiss organisation for business ethics

== See also ==
- Guille (disambiguation)
