= Jobet =

Jobet is a surname. Notable people with the surname include:

- Juan Carlos Jobet (born 1975), Chilean politician
- Julio César Jobet (1912–1980), Chilean Marxist historian
