= Antonio Moreno Casamitjana =

Chilean Catholic archbishop

- Archbishop of Concepción
- Church: Catholic Church
- Archdiocese: Archdiocese of Concepción
- In office: 14 October 1989 – 27 December 2006
- Predecessor: José Manuel Santos
- Successor: Ricardo Ezzati
- Previous posts: Titular Bishop of Mades (1986-1989); Auxiliary Bishop of Santiago de Chile (1986-1989)

Orders
- Ordination: 4 December 1949 by José María Caro Rodríguez
- Consecration: 9 July 1986 by Juan Francisco Fresno

Personal details
- Born: 9 July 1927 Santiago, Chile
- Died: 31 July 2013 (aged 86)

Antonio Moreno Casamitjana (9 July 1927 – 31 July 2013) was a Chilean Catholic archbishop.

Archbishop Moreno was born in Santiago in 1927, son of Antonio Moreno and María Casamitjana. As a youth, he participated in Parroquia Nuestra Señora de Andacollo, Santiago. Ordained to the priesthood in 1949, he was appointed bishop in 1986 and became archbishop of the Archdiocese of Concepción, Chile in 1989 and retired in 2007.
