= Hogar de Cristo =

Chilean public charity

Coordinates: 33°27′42.80″S 70°41′15.25″W

- Formation: 19 October 1944
- Founder: Saint Alberto Hurtado Cruchaga
- Type: Charity Institution
- Legal status: Foundation
- Headquarters: Chile Estación Central Santiago, Chile
- Chaplain: Pablo Walker, S.J.
- Director: Verónica Monroy
- President: José Musalem Sarquis
- Language: Spanish
- Key people: Volunteers
- Affiliations: Fundación Paréntesis, Fundación Emplea, Fundación Súmate, Fundación Rostros Nuevos
- Volunteers: Anonymous
- Website: www.hogardecristo.cl

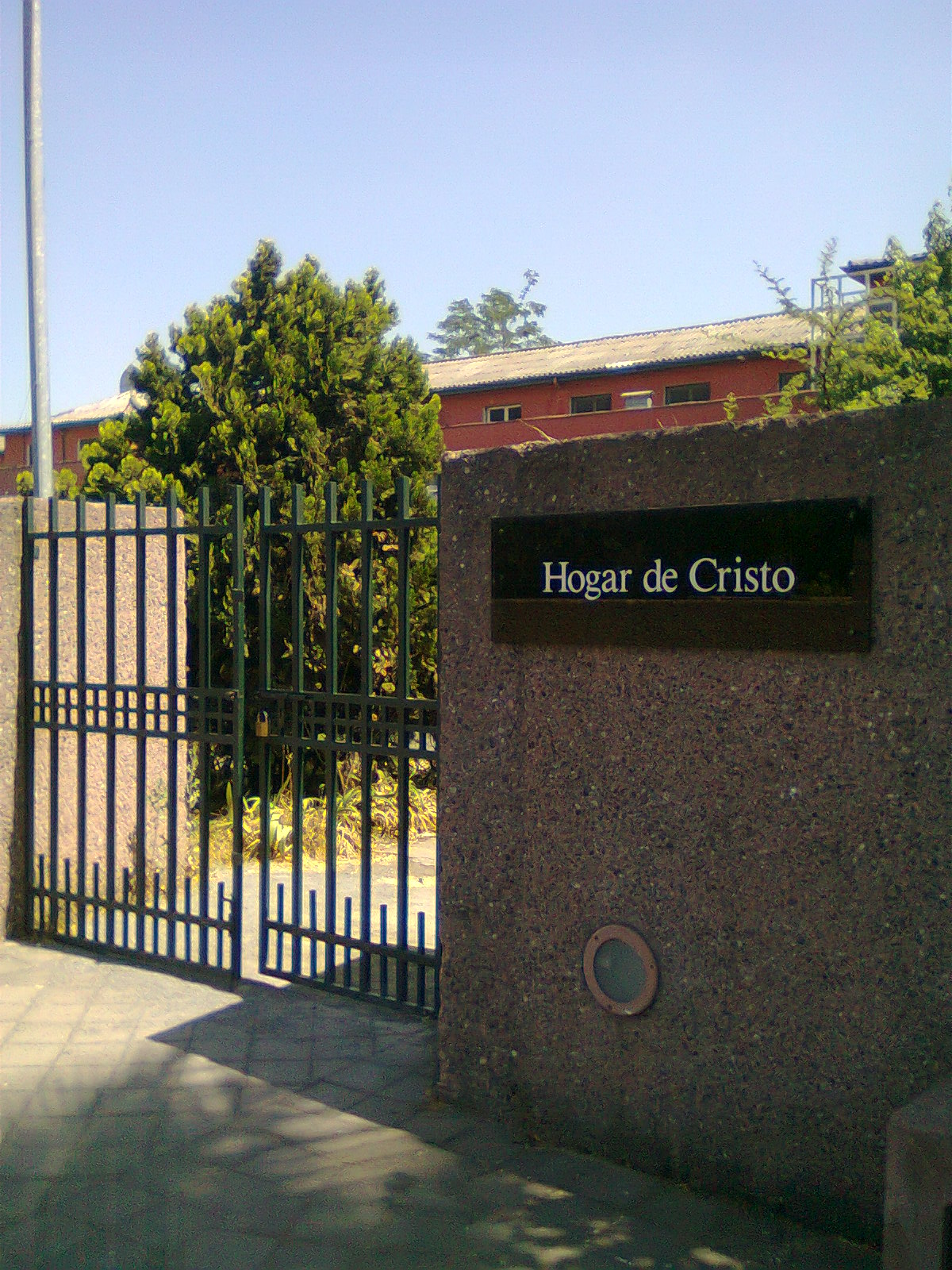
Entrance to headquarters through Fr. Hurtado Sanctuary

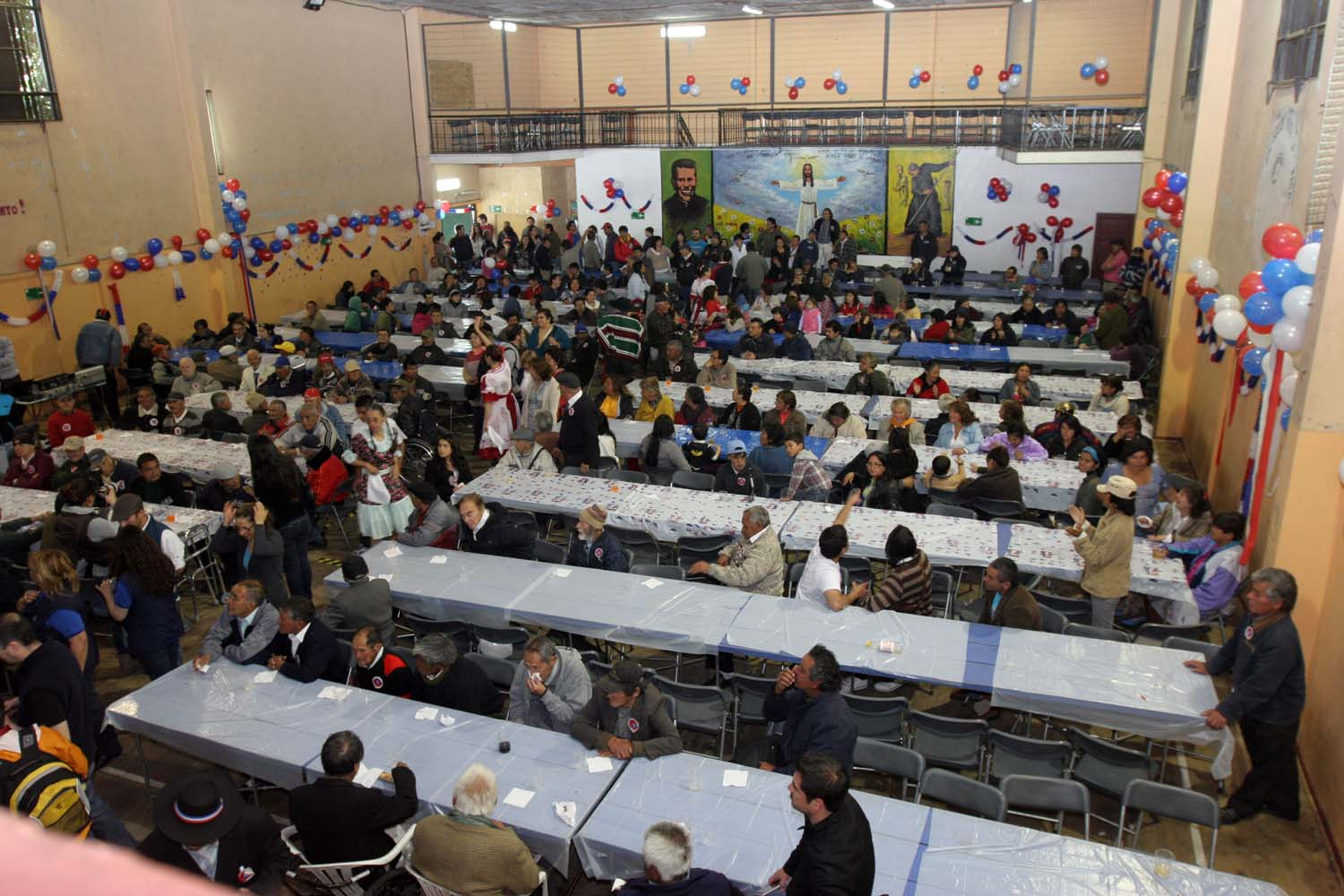
A Hogar de Cristo dining hall

Hogar de Cristo ("Home of Christ", in English; pronounced /o.'ɣaɾ.ðe.'kɾis.to/ in Spanish) is a Chilean public charity created by Saint Alberto Hurtado, a Jesuit priest, on October 19, 1944. He was declared as saint by the Pope Benedict XVI in 2005. Currently, this foundation serves monthly more than 25,000 people in extreme poverty, in the more than 500 works throughout the country. It is led by Fr. Pablo Walker and is part of the works of the Jesuits in Chile.

== History ==
Hogar de Cristo was born as an initiative of the Jesuit priest Alberto Hurtado Cruchaga, who wanted to create a place of refuge for street people. He began a campaign, mainly through the newspaper "El Mercurio", that led to the foundation of the Home. On 21 December 1944 he laid the cornerstone of the headquarters located on Bernal del Mercado Street, in the commune of Estación Central, Santiago. The Foundation received legal status in 1945, and the first inn was created. The following year, the inn of Estación Central was opened, which now functions as the institutional headquarter.

Hogar de Cristo has exceeded its original vision and many different areas of social action have been included. Whereas initially it was exclusively an overnight home, it has come to cater to the terminally ill, destitute elderlies, young people with substance abuse problems, and others.

Fr. Hurtado, the Home's founder and chaplain, died in 1952 and was succeeded by Fr. Guillermo Balmaceda. In 1955, the Foundation began to spread into the rest of the country, to Antofagasta and Los Ángeles where the first branch-offices were inaugurated (1957). The Foundation opened its first nursing home in 1954, the first daylight opened in 1973, and the first central high risk home in 1981.

On 3 April 1987, Pope John Paul II visited the offices of Home of Christ in Santiago, as part of his visit to Chile during his six-day journey.

== Financing ==
Hogar manages resources of over $42,000 million Chilean pesos (about US$87 million), and is a major charity in Chile. Some donations are for specific goals, such as Fondo Esperanza (Fund-Hope, in English) – dedicated to microcredit – and Fundación para la Vivienda Hogar de Cristo (Home of Christ Foundation for Housing), which provides homes for low income people. Currently, it has more than 600,000 on its list of benefactors, 46 subsidiaries throughout Chile, and serves 73,000 people per day.

A traditional event initiated in 1983 and still occurring annually at Hogar de Cristo's branch offices around the country is Cena de Pan y Vino (Bread and Wine Supper), at which the Institution gives thanks to the community and to the business and political world for their support. This tradition invites and encourages everyone to continue their support. National television personalities and show-stars are involved in these dinners.

At a Chillán branch-office, the shirts of Deportivo Ñublense were auctioned off in 2007, shirts that showed Hogar de Cristo as a sponsor in some of the Championship matches of the Chilean Primera División during that year, being the first Chilean club to include a charity sponsor on its shirt.

== Chaplains ==
- Alberto Hurtado Cruchaga, S.J. (1944 - 1952)
- Guillermo Balmaceda, S.J. (1952-)
- Álvaro Lavín, S.J.
- José Cifuentes G., S.J. (-1979)
- Renato Hevia, S.J. (1979-1982)
- Renato Poblete Barth, S.J. (1982-2000)
- Agustín Moreira Hudson, S.J. (2000-2011)
- Pablo Walker Cruchaga, S.J. (2011-)

== Affiliated foundations ==
- Fundación Paréntesis (Parenthesis)
- Fundación Rostros Nuevos (New Faces)
- Fundación Emplea (Employs)
- Fundación Súmate (Join)
