= Guille (name) =

Guille can refer to a surname, a given name, or a nickname for the Spanish-language name Guillermo. Notable people with the name include:

== Surname ==
- Guille (surname)

== Given name ==
- Guille Garcia (born 1947), Cuban-born American musician
- Guille López (born 1992), Spanish footballer
- Guille Rubio (born 1982), Spanish basketball player
- Guille Smitarello (born 1993), Spanish footballer
