= Mario Góngora =

Chilean historian (1915–1985)

- Born: 22 June 1915; Santiago, Chile
- Died: 18 November 1985 (aged 70)
- Awards: Chilean National History Award (1976)
- Scientific career
- Fields: History of Chile
- Notable students: Gonzalo Vial; Gabriel Salazar

Mario Góngora del Campo (June 22, 1915 – November 18, 1985) was a Chilean historian considered "one of the most important Chilean historians of the 20th century". Though his work he examined the history of the inquilinos, the encomentaderos, rural vagabonds and Indian Law (Derecho Indiano). He was in charge of university courses on medieval history.

In 1943, Góngora entered to work as teacher at the Pedagogy School (Escuela de Pedagogía) at the Pontifical Catholic University of Chile. There he assisted Jaime Eyzaguirre in the History of Chile (Historia de Chile) classes. Most of the students of the time were priests, nuns and brothers.

== Books published ==
- El estado en el derecho indiano: época de fundación (1492-1570), (1951)
- Evolución de la propiedad rural en el Valle de Puangue, (1956)
- Estudios sobre el galicanismo y la 'Ilustración Católica' en América española, (1957)
- Origen de los inquilinos de Chile Central, (1960)
- Los grupos de conquistadores en tierra firme (1509-1530): fisonomía histórico-social de un tipo de conquista, (1962)
- Aspectos de la ilustración católica en el pensamiento y la vida eclesiástica chilena (1770-1814), (1969)
- Encomenderos y estancieros: estudios acerca de la constitución social aristocrática de Chile después de la conquista, 1580-1660, (1970)
- Estudios de historia de las ideas y de historia social, (1980)
- Ensayo histórico sobre la noción de Estado en Chile en los siglos XIX y XX, (1981)
- Libertad política y concepto económico de gobierno en Chile hacia 1915-1935, (1986)
- Civilización de masas y esperanza y otros ensayos, (1987)
- Diario (2013)
