= Guille =

Guille may refer to:

- Guille (name), a surname and given name
- Guillé, a town in Burkina Faso

== See also ==
- Guile (disambiguation)
