= Parroquia Nuestra Señora de Andacollo, Santiago =

Parroquia Nuestra Señora de Andacollo
- Parroquia Nuestra Señora del Rosario de Andacollo
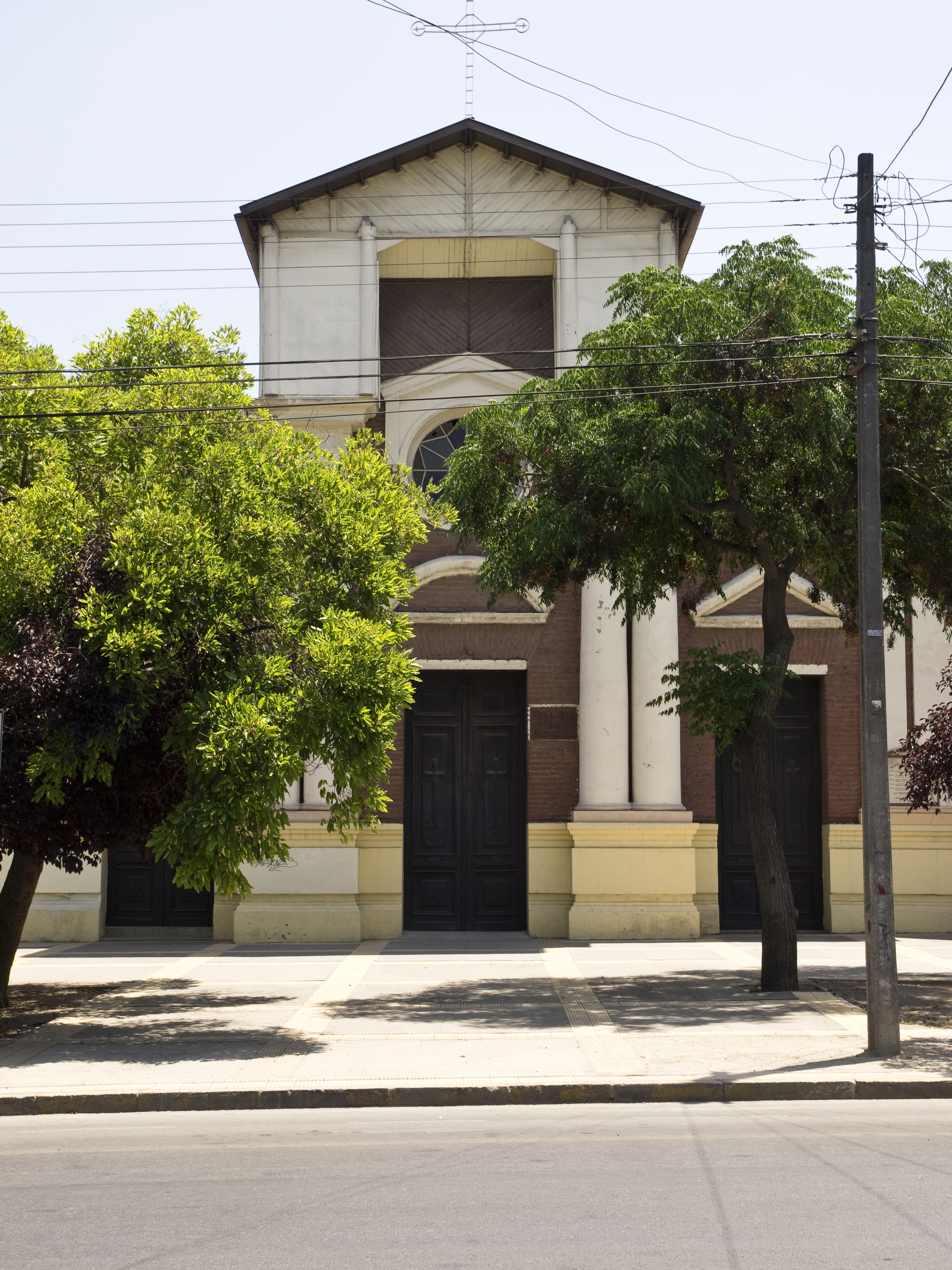
- Parroquia de Nuestra Señora de Andacollo, Santiago, Chile.
- Parroquia Nuestra Señora de Andacollo
- 33°25.54′S 70°40.10′W
- Location: Mapocho 2325; Santiago, Chile
- Country: Chile
- Denomination: Roman Catholic
- Website: Parroquia Nuestra Señora de Andacollo

History
- Former name(s): Capilla de San Vicente Ferrer (1865), Santuario de Nuestra Señora de Andacollo (1903)
- Founded: June 6, 1912
- Dedication: Our Lady of Andacollo

Administration
- Province: Roman Catholic Ecclesiastical Province of Santiago de Chile
- Archdiocese: Roman Catholic Archdiocese of Santiago de Chile

Clergy
- Archbishop: Most Rev. Ricardo Ezzati Andrello
- Pastor(s): Rev. Joe Tomei, C.S.C.

Parroquia Nuestra Señora de Andacollo, Santiago is Catholic parish in Santiago, Chile dedicated to Our Lady of Andacollo. The parish shares the same city block with Colegio de Nuestra Señora de Andacollo, a school administered, like the parish, by the Congregation of Holy Cross. Holy Cross Sisters serve in the parish as well.

"Our Lady of Andacollo" (Spanish: Nuestra Señora de Andacollo), also known as the "Virgin of Andacollo" (Spanish: Virgen de Andacollo), is a celebrated Catholic image of the Virgin Mary.

Founded in 1912, it is a Roman Catholic parish in the Archdiocese of Santiago. Since 1977, the parish has been under the direction of the Congregation of Holy Cross. Holy Cross assumed responsibility for both the parish and school at the request of Cardinal Raúl Silva Henríquez.

== History ==
In 1865, Parroquia de Nuestra Señora de Andacollo was born as a chapel in honor of St. Vincent Ferrer to serve the people living to the west of the old downtown of Santiago, Chile. In 1890, a chaplain, Rev. Hernan Domeyko was assigned to the chapel. In 1901, the Archdiocese of Santiago gave permission for the construction of a church on the site of the old chapel. On Christmas Eve of 1902, the parishioners requested the construction of a church in honor of St. Vicent Ferrer and a chapel dedicated to Our Lady of Andacollo. Rev. Malcolm Johnson, C.S.C. reported in 1987 that, in spite of extensive archival research, he could not uncover the reason for the change, but, from 1903 forward, the community would be referred to as the "Sanctuary of Our Lady of Andacollo."

By 1912, the Sanctuary had grown in importance to the neighborhood that it was necessary to give it the designation of parish with Rev. Ladislao Godoy as its first pastor. By 1917, the parish census had grown to between 25,000 and 30,000 parishioners over a span of 100 city blocks.

In 1943, Nicomedes Guzmán wrote his novel about the poverty of the neighborhood, "La sangre y la esperanza" [The Blood and the Hope], that frequently marks the presence of the parish in the life of the poor by the sound of the church's bells in key moments of the novel.

== Formation of a Saint ==
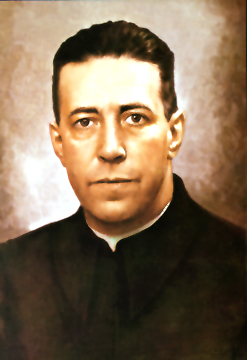
St. Alberto Hurtado

In 1913, the parish school had 180 students. That year, a night school was opened in addition to the day school, given that so many students worked during the day. During this same period, a student from a prestigious Jesuit school, San Ignacio, volunteered at the parish and school. That student worked in the office, as librarian, and as banker for the parish's students and its worker center. This student later enrolled in law school, focus on labor law, before entering the seminary with the Jesuits. Today, he is known as St. Alberto Hurtado. St. Alberto Hurtado was a champion of youth and the poor. His ministry with both began at Andacollo.

== Service to the Poor ==
From its inception, the parish served a large community of low-income persons. The needs always were greater than the resources. The parish responded creatively to remedy the massive needs. In 1906, a workers center was created. In 1911, the "Unión Protectora de Andacollo," a mutual benefit society or friendly society was formed. In 1915, the parish formed a conference of the Society of Saint Vincent de Paul.

Later, the parish was the seat of Catholic Action in Chile, a movement to bring Catholic social teaching into the public square.

== On-going Service to the Poor ==
Today, this tradition of service continues at Parroquia de Nuestra Señora de Andacollo. The parish serves long-time residents of the neighborhood as well as a growing immigrant population from Peru, Bolivia, Ecuador, and Colombia. The parish has a dedicated meeting space for Alcoholics Anonymous. The parish has a thrift store as well as a soup kitchen for the elderly of the neighborhood.

In 2011, FundaMor began a project attending to neighborhood children. FundaMor, the Congregation of Holy Cross' foundation that supervises homes for children in Chile, launched a "prevention" project in the parish. At no cost to the families, children from families with difficulties meet with a psychologist, a school psychologist, and a social worker to resolve family problems before the child would need to be removed from the home. Currently, the project attends to fifty children and has a waiting list.

== Earthquakes ==
The 1985 Santiago earthquake provoked extensive damage to the church. It struck, in fact, during mass, and, while all escaped the church safely, the church tower fell. Nine months after the earthquake, on December 3, 1985, restoration work commenced. Almost a year to the day later, on December 6, 1986, the church was rededicated in a celebration of the Eucharist, presided over by Cardinal Juan Francisco Fresno, then Archbishop of Santiago. In 1987, the parish set about restoring the office, meetings rooms, and soup kitchen.

The 2010 Chile earthquake also rendered extensive damage to the church. For several weeks, the parish worshiped outdoors. Eventually, sufficient funds were raised to repair the interior of the church. The parish soup kitchen remains, needing significant structural reinforcement.

== Vocations ==
In addition to contributing to the formation of St. Alberto Hurtado, Archbishop Antonio Moreno Casamitjana, emeritus Archbishop of the Roman Catholic Archdiocese of Concepción is a native son of the parish.

== Pastors ==
- Rev. Ladislao Godoy (1912–1928)
- Rev. Jose de la Cerda (1928–1934)
- Rev. Alberto Jacques (1935–1951)
- Rev. Vicente Ahumada (1951–1962)
- Rev. Agustin Lloret (1962–1965)
- Rev. Luis Bascuñan (1965–1972)
- Rev. Juan Gonzalez, O.F.M., Cap. (1973–1976)
- Deacon Oscar Barraza (1976)
- Rev. Gerald T. Papen, C.S.C. (1977)
- Rev. Robert G. Simon, C.S.C. (1977)
- Rev. Douglas Smith, C.S.C. (1978–1979)
- Rev. Fermin Donoso, C.S.C. (1979–1980)
- Rev. Richard Elliott, C.S.C. (1981–1985)
- Rev. Malcolm Johnson, C.S.C. (1985–1995)
- Rev. Gerald T. Papen, C.S.C. (1995–2003)
- Rev. Romulo Vera, C.S.C. (2004–2009)
- Rev. Gerald R. Barmasse, C.S.C. (administrator) (2010)
- Rev. Christopher W. Cox, C.S.C. (2011–2014)
- Rev. Rómulo Vera, C.S.C. (administrador) (2014)
- Rev. Joseph Tomei, C.S.C. (2015–present)

== Bibliography ==
- Malcolm Johnson, C.S.C., "Parroquia de Ntra. Sra. de Andacollo: 1912-1987," privately published, 1987.
- Héctor Fuentes Vásquez, "Recuerdos de un Andacollino Agradecido," privately published, 2003.
