= Armando de Ramón =

Chilean historian (1927–2004)

- Born: 6 February 1927; Santiago, Chile
- Died: 29 February 2004 (aged 77); El Yeco, Chile
- Awards: Chilean National History Award (1998)
- Scientific career
- Fields: History of Chile

José Armando de Ramón Folch (February 6, 1927 - February 29, 2004) was a Chilean historian mostly known for his study of urban history. In 1954, de Ramón joined the newly founded Instituto de Investigacions Históricas of the Pontifical Catholic University of Chile led by Jaime Eyzaguirre. He was part of the editorial committee of the journal Historia since it was established in 1961. In 1998, he was awarded the Chilean National History Award.
