= Workers' United Center of Chile =

Trade union operating since 1988

- Central Unitaria de Trabajadores de Chile
- Abbreviation: CUT
- Founded: 1988; 38 years ago
- Headquarters: Santiago, Chile
- Location: Chile
- Key people: Arturo Martínez, president
- Affiliations: ITUC

The Workers' United Center of Chile (Spanish: Central Unitaria de Trabajadores de Chile, CUT) is a union federation in Chile. The CUT was founded in 1953, but it was suppressed after the Chilean coup of 1973. It was refounded in September 1988 near the end of Augusto Pinochet's dictatorship.

The CUT is affiliated with the International Trade Union Confederation (ITUC).

== See also ==
- Clotario Blest (1899–1990)
