= Our Lady of Andacollo =

Catholic statue of the Virgin Mary in Andacollo, Coquimbo Region, Chile

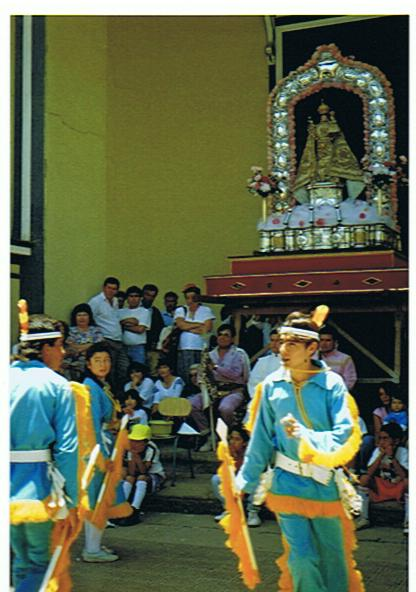
- Location: Andacollo, Coquimbo Region, Chile
- Date: December 26
- Type: Marian shrine
- Shrine: Basilica of Our Lady of Andacollo, Andacollo, Chile.
- Patronage: Chile
- Attributes: woman clothed with golden-brown tunic covered by blue mantle, standing upon the head of a serpent and a crescent moon and being carried by an angel

Our Lady of Andacollo (Spanish: Nuestra Señora de Andacollo), also known as the Virgin of Andacollo (Spanish: Virgen de Andacollo), is a celebrated Catholic statue of the Virgin Mary located in the town of Andacollo, in the Coquimbo Region in the north of Chile. The carving is the centre of the annual Fiesta Grande de la Virgen (Great Festival of the Virgin) that draws thousands of pilgrims from around the world in December.

== Origins ==
The small wooden statue of the Virgin Mary is said to have been found by a local indigenous person near the mines of Andacollo at the beginning of the conquest period. There are many explanations for how the statue came to be where it was found. The most accepted holds that it was left there by a Spanish soldier or by priests who had fled with the statue after the 1549 attack on the city of La Serena by the indigenous population.

== Veneration ==
After four centuries of veneration in Andacollo and devotion coming from beyond Chilean borders, Cardinal Mariano Rampolla del Tindaro decreed on 15 June 1899, at the command of Pope Leo XIII, that the statue be given a Canonical coronation. The decree was implemented by the Claretians, who took on stewardship of the sanctuary in 1900, and the crown and jewels were paid for in large part by local fundraising. The statue of Our Lady of Andacollo was crowned on 26 December 1901.

Four churches have been built for the Virgin over the years. The first was constructed in the 16th century and the second in the 17th century, but this only lasted until 1776. The third church, constructed in the 18th century after undergoing numerous repairs for earthquake damage, is where the image of the Virgin now resides for most of the year. Finally, between 1873 and 1893, a new church was constructed, which was declared a minor basilica by Pope John Paul II, the Basilica of Our Lady of Andacollo.

== Festivals ==
The town of Andacollo is visited every year by thousands of pilgrims from Chile and abroad, the majority of whom come for the Fiesta Grande de la Virgen (Great Festival of the Virgin) which takes place in December. The Fiesta Grande, filled with colour, dancing and music performed by numerous confraternities and dance groups, is held at the Basilica of Our Lady of Andacollo. It starts each year on December 23 and lasts for at least five days, during which the statue is dressed in her crown and special clothes embroidered with gold, then carried in a solemn procession to the basilica accompanied by dance groups and pilgrims.

There is also a smaller festival, the Fiesta Chica (“small festival”), which takes place on the first Sunday of October.

=== Legacy ===
- The Basilica of Our Lady of Andacollo, the shrine founded in Andacollo, Chile
- Parroquia Nuestra Señora de Andacollo, Santiago, Chile
- The Congregation of Holy Cross administers the Colegio de Nuestra Señora de Andacollo in (Santiago), Chile.

== See also ==
- Roman Catholic Archdiocese of La Serena
