= Guillermo Blest Gana =

Chilean writer

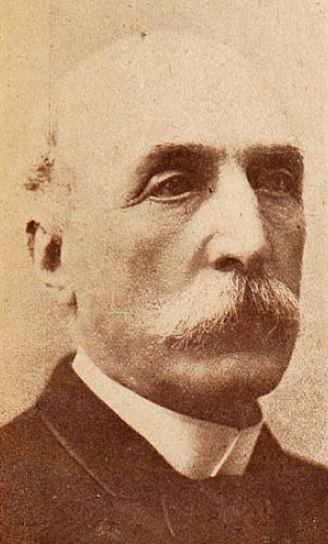
- Born: 28 April 1829; Santiago, Chile
- Died: 11 July 1904 (aged 75); Santiago, Chile
- Education: National Institute
- Relatives: William Cunningham Blest (father); María de la Luz Gana López (mother); Alberto Blest Gana (brother); Joaquín Blest Gana (brother)
- Writing career
- Language: Spanish

Guillermo Blest Gana (28 April 1829 – 7 November 1904) was a Chilean writer, usually considered one of his country's leading exponents of Romantic literature.

== Biography ==
Guillermo Blest Gana was born in Santiago in 1829, the son of Chilean aristocrat María de la Luz Gana López and Anglo-Irish doctor William Cunningham Blest, one of the pioneers of the modernization of medicine in Chile in the first half of the 19th century. Carlos Orrego Luco described Guillermo as follows:

He was tall, slender, very white, with broad forehead raised in shining inspiration, crowned with long, blond, wavy hair in the romantic manner; large luminous eyes the color of sky, dreamy look that, according to the chronicles, captivated all female hearts...

Blest Gana studied at the National Institute and accepted a professorship at the University of Chile. In 1857 he was exiled from the country for opposing the government of President Manuel Montt, and lived in various American and European countries.

He returned to Chile in 1863 and entered service as a diplomat to Ecuador, Argentina, and Brazil. In 1894 he served as mayor of Linares.

Guillermo's younger brother Alberto Blest Gana also dedicated himself to writing, and is considered the greatest Chilean novelist of the era. His work is still in print and is required reading in schools. Guillermo's other brother Joaquín practiced literary criticism.

== Writing ==
Gana is best remembered for his lyrical work. He also dabbled, with less success, in novels, short stories, historical dramas, and zarzuelas. He began publishing poetry at age 19 in the Journal of Santiago. In 1858 he founded the Journal of the Pacific in Valparaíso.

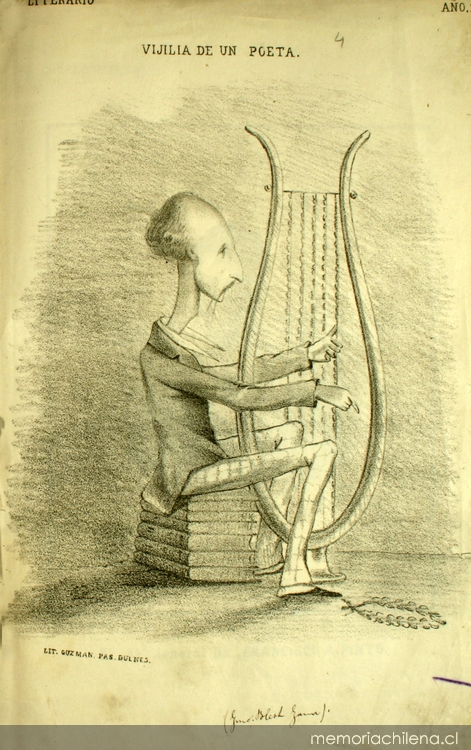
Guillermo Blest Gana, a caricature by Antonio Smith

== Selected works ==
=== Lyrical ===
- Poesías, 1854
- Armonías, 1884

=== Novel ===
- El número 13, 1869

=== Drama ===
- La conjuración de Almagro, 1858

=== Zarzuela ===
- El pasaporte, 1890
