= Julio César Jobet =

Chilean Marxist historian (1912–1980)

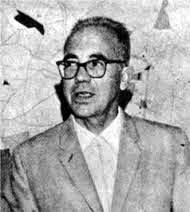
- Born: 18 January 1912; Perquenco, Chile
- Died: 1980; Santiago, Chile
- Scientific career
- Fields: History of Chile, Marxist historiography

Julio César Jobet Bourquez (January 18, 1912 – 1980) was a Chilean Marxist historian. He was descendant of French and Spanish agricultural colonists who arrived to La Araucanía Region in the aftermath of the Occupation of Araucanía. He was a detractor of historian Jaime Eyzaguirre whom he criticized in harsh terms.

Memoria Chilena lists his most important works as:

- Los fundamentos del marxismo (1939)
- Santiago Arcos Arlegui y la sociedad de la Igualdad: Un socialista utopista Chileno (1942)
- Ensayo crítico del desarrollo económico-social de Chile (1951)
- Luis Emilio Recabarren: los orígenes del movimiento obrero y del socialismo chileno (1955)
- Los precursores del pensamiento social de Chile (1956)
- El Partido Socialista de Chile (1971).
