= Guillermo Torrez =

Bolivian politician (born 1973)

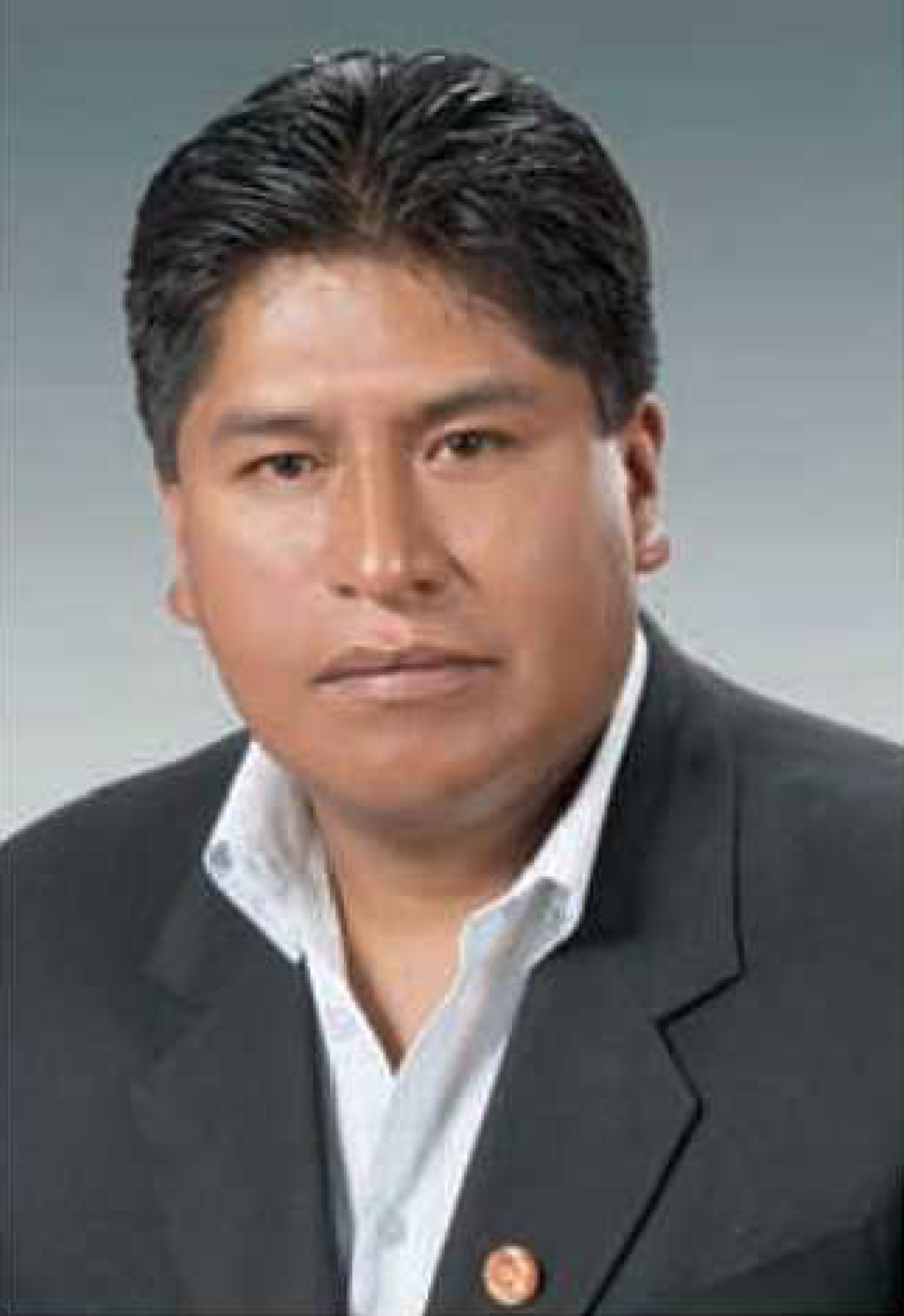
- Official portrait, 2014

Member of the Chamber of Deputies from La Paz circumscription 11
- In office 19 January 2010 – 18 January 2015
- Substitute: Felicidad Suazo
- Preceded by: Jorge Silva
- Succeeded by: Rosa Inés Chuquimia (Note: Redistribution; circumscription 9.)
- Constituency: La Paz

Personal details
- Born: Osvaldo Guillermo Torrez Arisaca; 24 June 1973 (age 53) La Paz, Bolivia
- Party: Movement for Socialism
- Occupation: Organizer; politician
- Website: Official blog

Osvaldo Guillermo Torrez Arisaca (born 24 June 1973) is a Bolivian community organizer and politician who served as a member of the Chamber of Deputies from La Paz, representing circumscription 11 from 2010 to 2015.

Torrez was born in La Paz and operated an auto repair shop in his youth. He became involved in community organizing and held ranking positions in the city's micro-enterprise cooperatives. A member of the Movement for Socialism, Torrez assumed leadership posts within the party apparatus. In 2009, he ran for and won a seat in parliament, representing an urban constituency in the capital city. He was not nominated for reelection.

== Early life and career ==
=== Early life and education ===
Guillermo Torrez was born on 24 June 1973, the youngest of three siblings born to Luciano Torrez Choque and Eusebia Arisaca. Torrez's family occupied a small adobe dwelling in the El Tejara barrio of northwestern La Paz along the border with El Alto, one of the most impoverished areas of the city.

Torrez attended local institutes for most of his primary and secondary education and received his baccalaureate after migrating to Santa Cruz, from the 24 de Septiembre School, where he took night courses. Though he never pursued formal university education, Torrez did attend trade schools; he took courses at INFOCAL (Note: National Foundation for Professional Development (Spanish: Fundación Nacional para la Capacitación Laboral).) and graduated as an industrial welder from the Santa Cruz Technological Institute.

=== Career and community organizing ===
Torrez operated a small auto repair shop in Santa Cruz de la Sierra for some time. On his return to La Paz, he became engaged in community-building activities and ventured into organizational leadership in the city's micro-enterprise cooperatives: he served as secretary of sports for his local neighborhood council in 2001 and held ranking positions in the Departmental Federation of Micro and Small Enterprises around 2005.

Longtime support for left-wing principles accompanied Torrez's activist and organizational activities. As early as 2002, he was active in a small Che Guevara-inspired cell affiliated with the fledgling Movement for Socialism (MAS-IPSP). (Note: In contrast to big businesses and large multinationals, the MAS fostered tender relations with the micro and small business sector: its leaders bore little of the brunt of the party's anti-capitalist and anti-corporate rhetoric, and by contrast, shared the MAS's mistrust for the country's economic elite and sympathized with its support for marginalized groups – from which they mostly originated.) Torrez held leadership positions in the MAS's zonal and district committees between 2002 and 2004 and was a member of its departmental committee in 2005.

== Chamber of Deputies ==
=== Election ===
Torrez ran for a seat in the Chamber of Deputies in 2009. He narrowly won the nomination of a MAS-affiliated social movement organization to be a candidate in the general election. The district he contested, single-member circumscription 11, encompassed La Paz's western slope, including large parts of its commercial zone. Torrez won the race in a landslide, (Note: When tabulating the high quantity of blank and null votes, Torrez's margin of victory (60.59%) is reduced to a plurality (46.29%). The figure represents a unique aspect of MAS candidates, wherein abstention – not opposition support – is their only counterweight. For sociologist Salvador Romero, this "demonstrates a certain indifference on the part of the electorate towards candidates who are expected to win, and about whom little is known.") defeating several candidates he believed to be more professionally qualified.

=== Tenure ===
Entering office, Torrez was made a member of the Health, Sports, and Recreation Committee, which he chaired for the near-duration of his term – excepting one year on the International Economic Relations Committee in 2011.^{[§]} At the end of his term, Torrez was not nominated for reelection.

=== Commission assignments ===
- Education and Health Commission
  - Health, Sports, and Recreation Committee (Secretary: 2010–2011, 2012–2015)
- International Relations and Migrant Protection Commission
  - International Economic Relations Committee (2011–2012)

== Electoral history ==
Electoral history of Guillermo Torrez
Year	Office	Party	Votes			Result	Ref.
Year	Office	Party	Total	%	P.	Result	Ref.
2009	Deputy	Movement for Socialism	52,283	60.59%	1st	Won	
Source: Plurinational Electoral Organ | Electoral Atlas

Chamber of Deputies of Bolivia
Preceded by Jorge Silva	Member of the Chamber of Deputies from La Paz circumscription 11; 2010–2015	Succeeded by Rosa Inés Chuquimia
