= Carlos Vergara =

Carlos Vergara may refer to:

- Carlos Vergara, Mexican architect, co-designed the Cine Latino in Mexico City
- Carlos Vergara Cailleaux (1854–1929), Spanish politician, governor of the Bank of Spain in 1924–1929
- Carlos Vergara Montero (1883–1959), Chilean politician, minister of war in 1931–1932
- Carlos Vergara Montiel (born 1972), Colombian actor and director, nominated for the Macondo Awards in 2023
- C. J. Vergara (Carlos Vergara, born 1991), American mixed martial artist
