= Alberto Hurtado =

20th-century Chilean Jesuit priest and social worker, later a saint

Saint Alberto Hurtado SJ
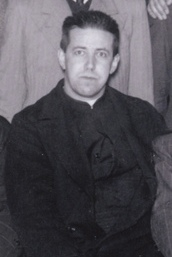
- San Alberto Hurtado
- Born: January 22, 1901; Viña del Mar, Chile
- Died: August 18, 1952 (aged 51); Santiago, Chile
- Venerated in: Catholic Church
- Beatified: October 16, 1994, Vatican City by Pope John Paul II
- Canonized: October 23, 2005, Vatican City by Pope Benedict XVI
- Major shrine: Shrine of Father Hurtado, Santiago, Chile
- Feast: August 18
- Attributes: Jesuit robes, an old green van
- Patronage: Chile, poor people, street children, social workers, and is also known as a class patron in Xavier School

Alberto Hurtado, SJ (Latin American Spanish: [alˈβeɾto wɾˈtaðo]; born Luis Alberto Hurtado Cruchaga; January 22, 1901 – August 18, 1952), popularly known as Padre Hurtado, was a Chilean Jesuit priest, lawyer, social worker, and writer of Basque descent. He founded the Hogar de Cristo foundation in 1944.

Hurtado was canonized on October 23, 2005, by Pope Benedict XVI, becoming his country's second saint.

== Early life and education ==
Alberto Hurtado was born in Viña del Mar, Chile, on January 22, 1901, to an aristocratic family. After the death of his father when Alberto was four years old, his mother, with just two small sons, decided to sell their large estate. Unfortunately the buyer defrauded her. The family, now impoverished, was forced to live with a succession of relatives.

From an early age, Hurtado experienced what it meant to be poor and without a home. Thanks to a scholarship, he was able to attend the prestigious, all-boys, Jesuit school of St. Ignacio in Santiago, Chile (1909–17). During this time, he volunteered at the Parroquia Nuestra Señora de Andacollo, Santiago, a Catholic parish and school in a poor neighborhood of Santiago, where he assisted in the office and was librarian. From 1918 to 1923, he attended the Pontificia Universidad Católica de Chile, studying in its law school and writing his thesis on labour law. After interrupting his studies for obligatory military service, he earned his degree in August 1923.

Hurtado entered the Jesuit novitiate in 1923. In 1925 he went to Córdoba, Argentina, where he studied humanities. In 1927 he was sent to Barcelona, Spain, to study philosophy and theology. When the Jesuits were suppressed in Spain in 1931, he continued his studies in theology at Louvain, Belgium. He was ordained a priest there on August 24, 1933, and in 1935 he obtained a doctorate in pedagogy and psychology.

== Educator ==
Before returning to Chile, Hurtado visited social and educational centers in Germany, France, Belgium, and the Netherlands. He returned to Chile in January 1936 and took up his post as professor of religion at Colegio San Ignacio and of Pedagogy at the Catholic University of Santiago. He was entrusted with the Sodality of Our Lady for the students, and he involved them in teaching catechism to the poor.

Conservative Catholics in Chile had difficulty accepting the church's social teachings. As late as 1931, the official organ of the party aligned with the church hierarchy refused to publish the papal encyclical Quadragesimo anno and considered it "an orientation directed to other parts of the world but not Chile."

In 1936, Hurtado authored an article entitled The Priesthood Crisis In Chile, which addressed the problem of the shortage of priests in Chile; his analysis was criticized as "exaggerated". He criticized the quality of catechism instruction offered in Chile and wrote that young men often signed up as catechists but lacked the necessary certificate.

== Social apostolate ==
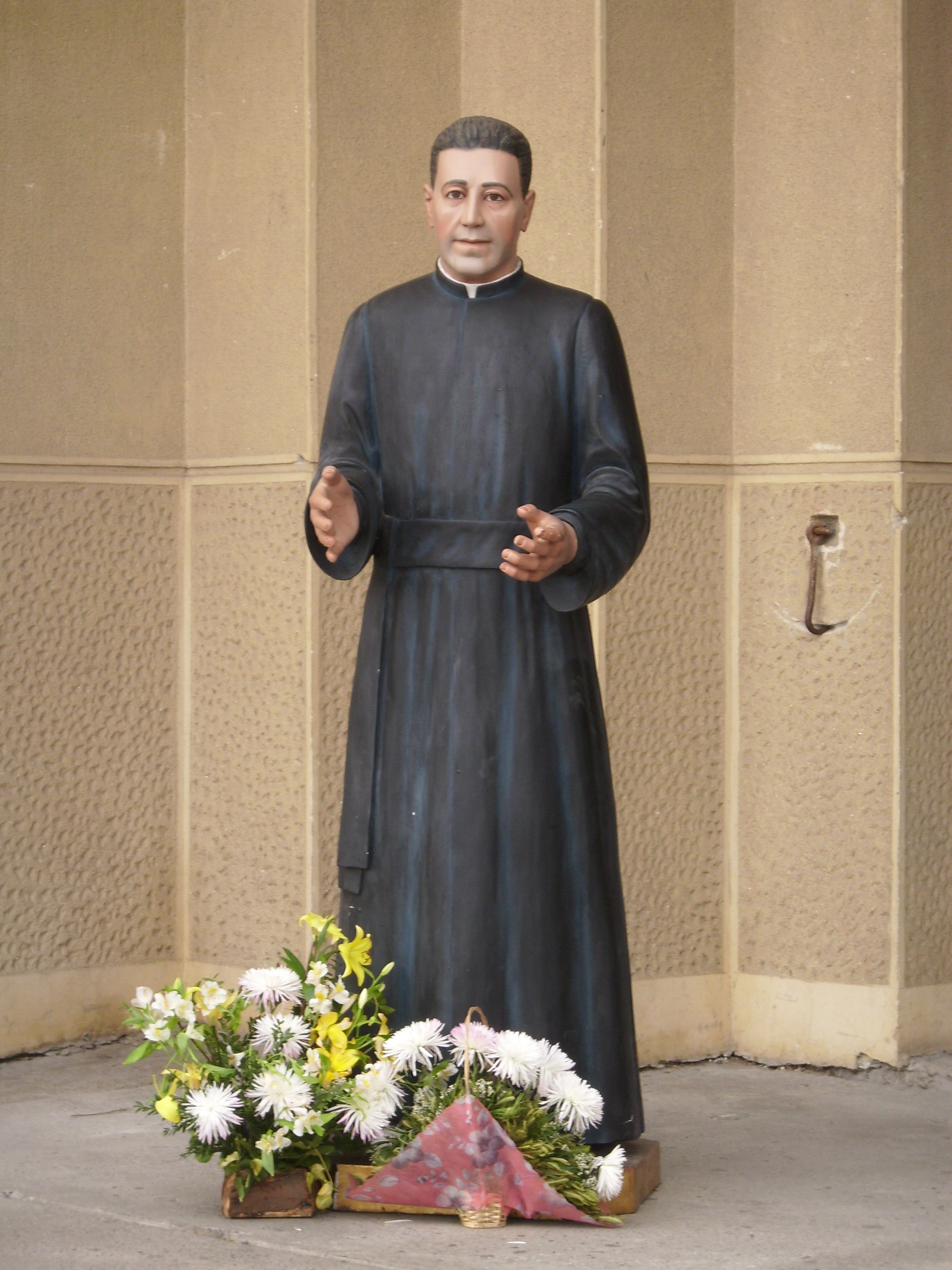
Padre Hurtado

In 1940, Hurtado was appointed diocesan director of the Catholic Action youth movement and he served as its national director from 1941 to 1944. Also in 1941, Hurtado authored Is Chile a Catholic Country? The book published statistics demonstrating a lack of priests assigned to the working class and rural populations, and it reported on parishes that had one priest assigned to 10,000 laypeople spread across huge geographic areas. He advocated an increase in the number of priests and better education for them. Almost half of Chile's clergy were foreigners, including missionaries from the United States and Canada, who rode circuits of towns to administer the sacraments. Most Chileans regarded devotion to the Virgin and the saints as more important than attending Mass or receiving the Eucharist, which they could not do regularly.

In the book, Hurtado published the results of a 1939 survey of Chilean religious practices and reported that only 9% of Chilean women and 3.5% of Chilean men regularly attended Mass. The book was heavily criticised by more conservative Catholics, who accused Hurtado of being a Communist.

Keeping in mind his own origins, and ever grateful for the help he and his family had received when they were in great difficulties, Hurtado was led to active social involvement. His strong faith was transformed into action with his founding of an organization similar to Boys Town in the United States. His shelters, called Hogar de Cristo (Home of Christ), took in all children in need of food and shelter, abandoned or not. He also purchased a 1946 green pickup truck and monitored the streets at night to help those in need that he could reach. His own charisma brought him many collaborators and benefactors. The movement was a huge success. The shelters multiplied throughout Chile and it is estimated that between 1945 and 1951 more than 850,000 children received some help from the movement.

== Labor movement and social doctrine of the church ==
In 1947, Hurtado entered the labor movement. Inspired by the social teaching of the church he founded the Chilean Trade Union Association, meant to train leaders and instill Christian values in the labor unions. He wrote three books: Social Humanism (1947), The Christian Social Order (1947) and Trade Unions (1950). He served as a confessor to the Falange Nacional, the precursor to the modern Christian Democratic Party. To disseminate the social teaching of the church and help Christians reflect and act on the serious social problems faced by Chile, he founded in 1951 the periodical Mensaje ("Message"). He published numerous articles and books on labor issues in relation to the Catholic faith.

== Death ==
In 1952, Hurtado was stricken with intense pain and rushed to the hospital. He was diagnosed with pancreatic cancer. Day after day the media kept the country informed of Hurtado's state of health. Before his death he had become a national hero. After a brief battle with the illness, he died in Santiago.

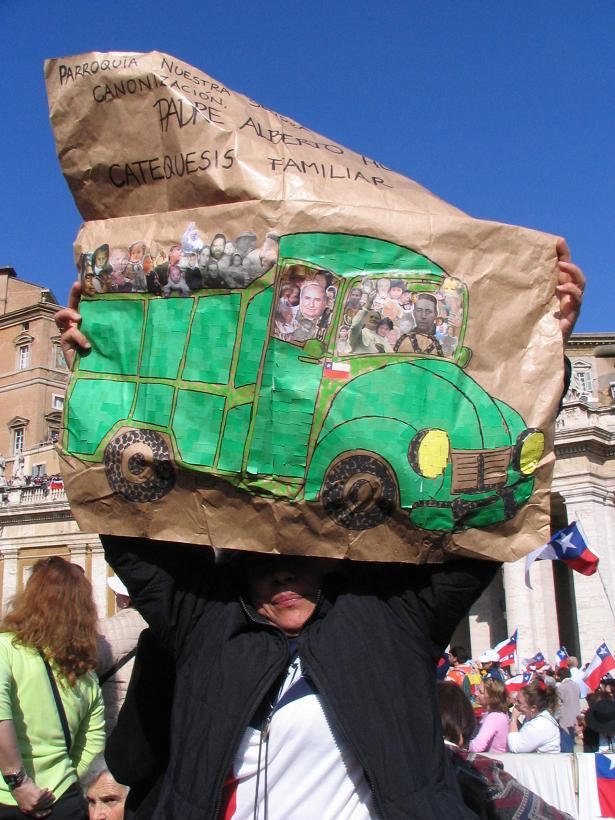
Fr. Hurtado's memorable green pickup truck

== Veneration ==
Hurtado was beatified on October 16, 1994, by Pope John Paul II and canonized by Pope Benedict XVI on October 23, 2005. Hurtado was one of the first people to be elevated to sainthood during the papacy of Pope Benedict XVI; he was also the second Chilean saint, after Teresa of Los Andes.

Hurtado is one of the most popular and cherished saints in his country, Chile. An indication of his lasting popularity was the presence in Saint Peter's Square, on the day of Hurtado's canonization, of a very large contingent of Chilean people, led by the highest authorities of the country, starting with President Ricardo Lagos and some high-ranking Chilean politicians who actually had been Hurtado's students during his school teacher time, like Senator Gabriel Valdés.

== Legacy ==
I hold that every poor man, every vagrant, every beggar is Christ carrying his cross. And as Christ, we must love and help him. We must treat him as a brother, a human being like ourselves. If we were to start a campaign of love for the poor and homeless, we would, in a short time, do away with depressing scenes of begging, children sleeping in doorways and women with babies in their arms fainting in our streets.

— St. Alberto Hurtado, SJ

- The "Hogar de Cristo" he founded still exists, and through its fight for social justice, it has become one of the biggest charity groups in Chile.
- There is also an avenue and the San Alberto Hurtado metro station in Santiago (the closest to his main shrine, which also houses the Hogar's headquarters) named after him.
- Alberto Hurtado University, located in Santiago and run by the Society of Jesus, preserves his name and strives to bring his legacy into contemporary education and social affairs, facilitating activities through its Center for Reflection and Social Action (CREAS).
- St. Joseph's Preparatory School in Philadelphia, PA, established The Hurtado Food Pantry, where a team of high school students organizes monthly food collections and deliveries, sending out thousands of pounds of food to the community. The Hurtado Cup is an intramural competition to raise the most money for a designated charitable cause.
- Xavier High School in New York, renamed a hall (in which a soup kitchen feeds over 900 meals every Sunday) and Seattle University has a Residential Learning Community named after him.
- Jesuit High School in Portland, Oregon, opens its empty classrooms in the evenings to an ESL program called The Hurtado Center.
- Belen Jesuit High School has started the Hurtado Experience for its ninth graders, taking them on retreats to help out the needy in Miami.
- The famous Jesuit boarding school Clongowes Wood College, Co. Kildare. Ireland, named their Bursary Programme after him in 2007. Ten percent (10%) of the student population are educated free in the interest of the school being socially just. This is not a scholarship but a bursary for students who would benefit most from a Clongowes education in the Jesuit tradition. Currently six years in Clongowes would cost €100800.00 ( 2011/2012 figures €16800 per annum ).
- Chilean historian Marciano Barrios Valdes considered the Catholic Action movement in Chile to be what sustained the Catholic Church's continued existence in Chile into the 1960s.
- The Jesuit run Rockhurst High School in Kansas City, Missouri, runs an accelerated learning program for inner-city, Catholic, middle school boys named "The Hurtado Scholars Program".
- Since 2006 the Press Club of Chile has presented the annual Alberto Hurtado Cruchaga Award (Spanish: Premio Alberto Hurtado Cruchaga) to people and institutions for service to the community in the field of journalism.
- Jesuit High School of Tampa Bay has a scholarship named after him for those students who serve in their community.
- He is patron of the Novitiate of the USA Midwest province of the Society of Jesus.

=== Criticism ===
Members of the Conservative Party denounced what they saw as Hurtado's endorsement of the National Falange, a party founded after young social Catholics split from the conservative party. There were also attacks from the left. An anonymous article published in Policarpo in 1982 called Hurtado "the last prophet of the bourgeoisie" while it contrasts him unfavorably with the figure of Enrique Alvear who is hailed as the "first Pastor of the Church of the poor in Chile". Clotario Blest, who like Hurtado was also intellectually indebted to Fernando Vives, is reported to have distanced himself from Hurtado.

== Media ==
During the 1990s there was a short TV series dedicated to him, named Crónica de un Hombre Santo (English: Chronicles of a Holy Man). Four actors portrayed Hurtado, from his childhood to his last years; popular telenovela actor Cristián Campos played the adult Hurtado during his ministry.

Hurtado's Facebook fan page has more than 50,000 followers.

== Main works ==
- ¿Es Chile un pais católico? (English: Is Chile a Catholic country?), Santiago (Chile), 1941.
- Humanismo social (English: Social humanism), Santiago (Chile), 1947.
- El orden social cristiano en los documentos de la jerarquía católica (English: Christian social order in the documents of the Catholic hierarchy), 2 vol., Santiago (Chile), 1947.
- Sindicalismo: historia-teoría-práctica (English: Syndicalism: History-Theory-Practice), Santiago (Chile), 1950.

== See also ==
- Bartolome Blanco Marquez, Youth leader of Catholic Action and martyr of the Spanish Civil War
- Alberto Marvelli
- Saint Alberto Hurtado, patron saint archive
- San Alberto Hurtado metro station
- Frederic Ozanam
- Alberto Hurtado University

== Bibliography ==
- CID, F.D.: El humanismo de Alberto Hurtado S.J., Santiago (Chile), 1975.
- LAVIN, A.: El P.Hurtado, amigo y apostol de los jovanes, Santiago (Chile), 1978.
- GILFEATHER, Katherine A.: Alberto Hurtado, a man after God's Heart, Santiago (Chile), 2004.
