= Clotario Blest =

Chilean trade unionist (1899–1990)

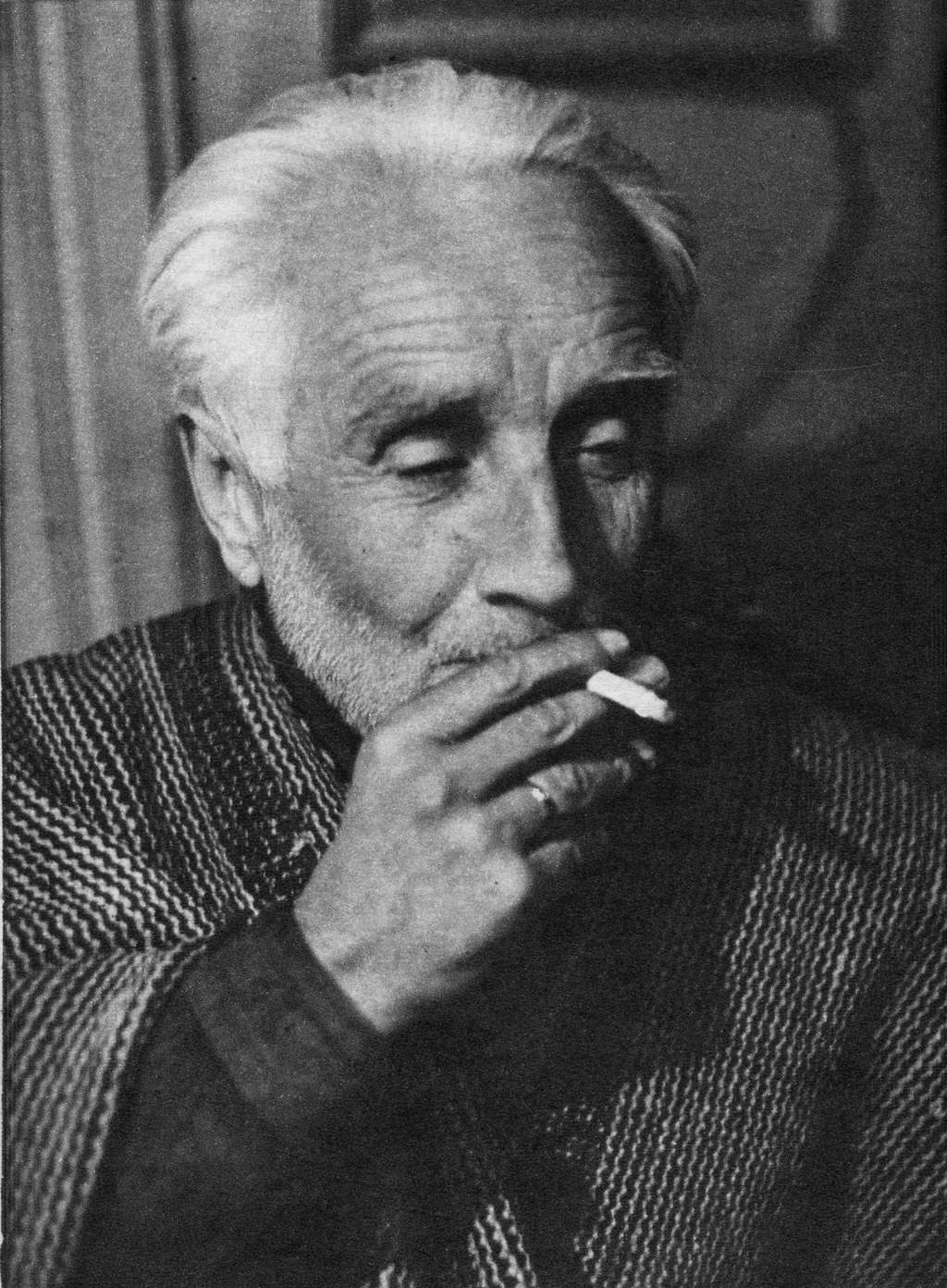
- Born: Clotario Leopoldo Blest Riffo; 17 November 1899; Santiago, Chile
- Died: 31 May 1990 (aged 90); Santiago, Chile
- Occupations: Trade unionist; social activist
- Movement: Partido Popular (1920s); Revolutionary Left Movement (1965–1967); Iglesia Joven (1960s)
- Relatives: Guillermo Blest Gana (paternal half-uncle); Alberto Blest Gana (paternal half-uncle); William Cunningham Blest (paternal grandfather)

Clotario Leopoldo Blest Riffo (Spanish pronunciation: [kloˈtaɾjo βlest]; 17 November 1899 – 31 May 1990) was a Chilean trade unionist, social activist and proponent of Catholic social teaching. Blest participated in the founding of the National Association of Fiscal Employees (ANEF), Workers' United Center of Chile (CUT), Revolutionary Left Movement (MIR), and Committee for the Defense of Human and Trade Union Rights (CODEHS).

== Early life ==
Clotario Leopoldo Blest Riffo was born on 17 November 1899 in Santiago to Ricardo Blest Ugarte, a member of the military, and Leopoldina Riffo Bustos, a primary school teacher. Blest had two siblings Fernando and Leopoldina. Blest's father was the illegitimate son of William Blest, and was the half-brother of Guillermo Blest Gana and Alberto Blest Gana. The Blest Gana family had little contact with the Blest Ugarte family.

Blest coursed primary school at a public school. Later he joined Seminario Pontificio de Santiago thanks to relatives who ceded to him a scholarship aimed for the main branch of the Blest family. He was interned nine years in the seminary. There he had teachers like José María Caro and Fernando Vives Solar, who influenced his thought. Fernando Vives in particular was a leading advocate of the Catholic social teachings in Chile. After this he graduated from school by doing exams at the University of Chile obtaining his diploma in 1918. Blest then enrolled in the Seminario de Concepción to study theology, where he was supervised by Alfredo Cifuentes Gómez. After two years in Concepción Blest travelled then to the seminary of La Serena to complete his studies but by then he had decided he did not have a religious vocation so he dropped out and returned to Santiago. Later Clotario Blest commented his dropout with the following words: "There must be a rebel within me. I do not easily accept orders with which I disagree".

== From divinity school dropout to union leader (1921–1938) ==
In 1921 when Blest returned to Santiago his mother was school director, his sister Leopoldina studied in Escuela Normalista, and his brother Fernando continued a military career. Given his family's economic problems, Blest decided to work instead of studying at university. It was in this period that Blest learned about Luis Emilio Recabarren whose talks and conferences he followed. Blest was influenced by the ideas of Recabarren whom he referred to as “the greatest and most genuine representative of the Chilean working class and of the people of Chile”.

Blest begun to be engaged in social causes in the 1920s. During this time he joined the study circle called El Surco which was directed by the priest Guillermo Viviani Contreras. The objective of El Surco was to fight for legislation that was favourable to the working class, promoting in the way the formation of labour unions. Blest did also join the political party Partido Popular that was created by Bartolomé Palacios Silva. It was in El Sindicalista, the newspaper of Partido Popular, that Blest wrote his first articles. Another organization in which Blest participated was La casa del pueblo directed by Viviani which sought to advocate syndicalism and some social Christian teachings. After years of work in "La casa del pueblo" Blest entered in conflict with the directive of the organization and left for good La casa del pueblo. The conflict had been about Blest's naming of the organization's chapel "Jesús obrero" (lit. "labourer Jesus") and the directive rejecting the name. Blest worked as salesman of castor oil, lawyer assistant and in a drug store before entering to work in Servicio de Tesorerías (Government Treasury). During his first years as a civil servant he also found time to study law, philosophy and chemistry.

== Union movement (1938–1961) ==
From 1922 onwards Blest was a civil servant at Tesorería General de la República. In 1929 he was named Tesorero Comunal of Providencia and in 1934 Tesorero Comunal of San Antonio. In the latter city Blest founded a night school for workers and a society for the protection of animals. When he returned to Santiago from San Antonio he helped to found the association of public servants. The law did however not permit for the formation of trade unions so Blest decided to found a sports association in 1938 which was named Asociación Deportiva de Instituciones Públicas (ADIP). It was from this group that the Agrupación Nacional de Empleados Fiscales (ANEF), was created in 1943. Blest was elected president of ANEF and held this position for 15 years.

== Beyond the unions (1961–1973) ==
In the 1960s Blest established relationships with groups inspired in the Cuban Revolution. In the same decade Blest came to identify with liberation theology. He held no official role in the UP government of Salvador Allende limiting himself to express concern about the need of unity among the workers.
