= Guile Island =

Island in Antarctica

- Location within Antarctica Location within Antarctic Peninsula

Geography
- Location: Antarctica
- Coordinates: 65°44′S 65°11′W

Administration
- Administered under the Antarctic Treaty System

Demographics
- Population: Uninhabited

Guile Island is an island lying 2 km (1 nmi) southwest of Duchaylard Island, in the Biscoe Islands of Antarctica. It was charted by the British Graham Land Expedition under John Rymill, 1934–37, and so named by the UK Antarctic Place-Names Committee in 1959 because, while there appears to be a number of landing places on this island, numerous underwater rocks make approach dangerous, so requiring guile in the attempt.

== See also ==
- List of Antarctic and sub-Antarctic islands
