= Guillermo Viviani =

Chilean priest (1893–1964)

- Born: 1893
- Died: 1964 (aged 70–71)
- Movement: Partido Popular

Guillermo Viviani Contreras was a Chilean Roman Catholic priest. In the 1920s Viviani ran two organizations; a study circle called El Surco whose objective was to fight for legislation that was favorably to the working class promoting in the way the formation of labour unions and "La casa del pueblo" which sought to advocate syndicalism and some Christian teachings. Clotario Blest was for a time member of both organizations. Viviani was a supporter of the Catholic political party Partido Popular.

Viviani was for a time prison chaplain at the Santiago Prison.
