= Ricardo Krebs =

Chilean historian (1918–2011)

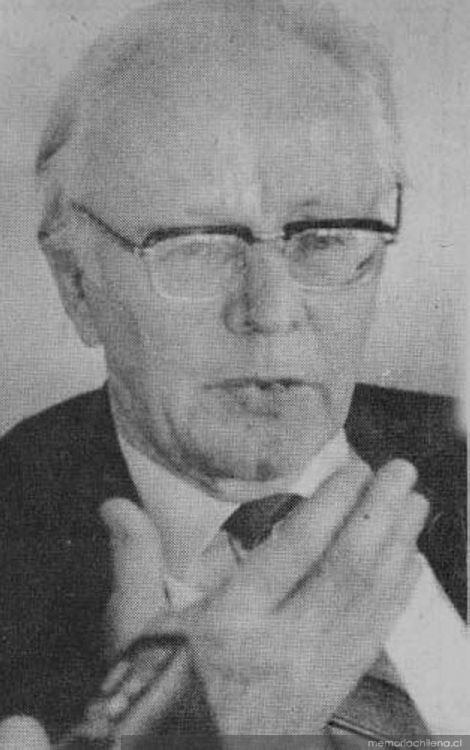
- Born: Ricardo Krebs Wilckens; 2 December 1918; Valparaíso, Chile
- Died: 23 December 2011 (aged 93); Santiago, Chile
- Education: University of Leipzig
- Awards: Chilean National History Award (1982)
- Scientific career
- Fields: History of Chile

Ricardo Krebs Wilckens (2 December 1918 – 23 December 2011) was a Chilean historian of German descent. In 1943.

== Life ==
Krebs joined the newly founded Pedagogy School (Escuela de Pedagogía) of the Pontifical Catholic University of Chile, where he was in charge of the universal history course. Krebs, as a native of Valparaíso, had until then spent a career in Germany and so he was rather isolated with few contacts in Santiago.

That changed when he met Jaime Eyzaguirre at the Pedagogy School, who introduced him to the Catholic intellectual elite of Santiago. He was part of the editorial committee of the journal Historia since it was established in 1961.
