= William Cunningham Blest =

Anglo-Irish doctor

William Cunningham Blest (1800 – 3 February 1884) was an Anglo-Irish medical doctor, the president of the first Medical Society of Chile, creator of the first School of Medicine in Chile, a politician and father of the novelist Alberto Blest Gana. Through his illegitimate son, Ricardo Blest Ugarte, he was grandfather of Clotario Blest.

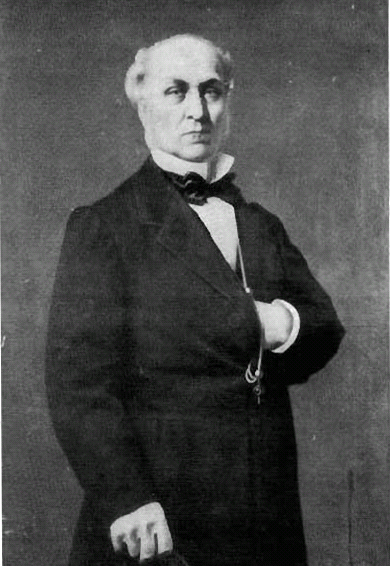
Guillermo Blest Cun

== Early life ==
He was born in Sligo, Ireland in 1800, son of Anglo-Irish clergyman and author Albert Blest and his wife Anna Maiben; members of the middle class, Reverend and Mrs. Blest gave good educations to their children. He studied at Trinity College in Dublin, receiving a degree in medicine; then continued his studies at the University of Edinburgh in the King James IV Academy, where he received a doctorate in medicine on 21 March 1821. He then moved to London, practicing medicine until he decided to emigrate because of the oversupply of doctors in London at the time. After persuasion by his brother Andrew Blest (who established the first brewery in Chile) about the good prospects for a doctor in the young country, William Blest arrived in Valparaíso, Chile, in 1823.

On 21 March 1827 he married María de la Luz Gana Darrigrandi, a woman from a wealthy family and sister-in-law of Manuel Blanco Encalada, which helped Dr Blest in setting up practice independently in Chile.

== Career ==
After three years' residence in his adopted country, Blest wrote in 1826 the essay "Observations about the present state of Medicine in Chile and a proposal for its improvement", highly critical of the sanitary conditions of Chile, its poor level of education, and the lack of interest in learning medical science properly. The repercussions of this report were immediate, and in the same year the government abolished the Protomedicato and created the Chilean Medical Society, constituted of all practitioners in Santiago de Chile, and made Blest its chairman.

On 4 April 1827 Freire, who was back in government, eliminated the Medical Society and replaced it with the General Medical Inspectorate, naming Blest as its Chief Inspector. After many other changes to the medical body of the young nation (each of which, Blest headed in turn), the infamous Protomedicario was permanently reinstated in 1830, with William Blest as its chairman. From that moment on, Dr Guillermo (William) Blest presided over any medical act in Chile, approving licences to practice, inspecting medical facilities and pharmacies. In his hands were left all responsibilities and authority with everything related with medicine; such power gained him many detractors, among them a Spaniard, Dr José Passaman.

Dr Blest's constant speeches about the importance of studies in the fields of medicine put him at the head of Chilean physicians when he published his "Essay on the most common causes of illnesses suffered in Chile". He then was assigned to create and inaugurate the School of Medicine in 1833 in the National Institute, which operated from the Hospital of Saint John of God. Blest served as its director for twenty years.

As an important member of Chilean society at the time, William Blest, after being granted Chilean nationality, was in 1832 elected a member of the national congress for Rancagua, a seat he occupied until 1834, but without major interventions. He was also a faithful supporter of the Public Beneficence, sitting on its council for many years, helping to create hospitals, cemeteries, orphans' asylums, and the like. He was later also elected a Senator.

== Death ==
Blest died in retirement at his estate in San Bernardo, on 3 February 1884, leaving to his adopted Chile a School of Medicine and a family illustrious on many accounts. Proof of that are his sons Alberto Blest Gana, one of the finest Chilean novelists; Guillermo Blest Gana, poet and author; and Joaquín Blest Gana, politician, lawyer, historian, and government minister.
