= Alberto Blest Gana =

Chilean novelist and diplomat

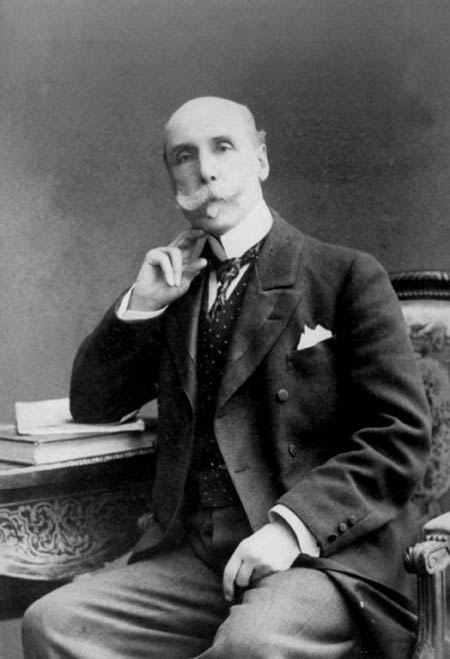
Alberto Blest Gana (c.1900)

Alberto Blest Gana (Spanish pronunciation: [alˈβeɾto βlest ˈɣana]; June 14, 1830 – November 8, 1920) was a Chilean novelist and diplomat, considered the father of Chilean novel. Blest Gana was of Irish and Basque descent.

== Biography ==
He was born in Santiago, the son of an Irishman, William Cunningham Blest, and of María de la Luz Gana Darrigrande, from an aristocratic landowning family. He studied at the Military Academy and then for one year in France.

A liberal, Alberto Blest was named intendant of the province of Colchagua and starting 1866 he was Chilean diplomatic representative at Washington, London and Paris. Among his successes were the inclusion of Chile in the Universal Postal Union and the purchase of armament for Chilean troops during the War of the Pacific. He also participated at border negotiations with Argentina, but with a less important role than his previous activities.

Blest Gana passionately read the novels of Honoré de Balzac. Upon his return home, he virtually founded the Chilean novel by adapting European techniques to some ten novels portraying various aspects of national history and life. Of these, the most important is Martín Rivas (1862), which describes the career of a young man during the 1851 political revolt. Abundant local color and social criticism accompany the action of the novel. Although these elements of description are not brought to life and fused with the plot in the manner of Balzac, the novel achieved great success as the first realistic portrayal of Chilean life. After its publication, Blest Gana entered the diplomatic service and was Chilean ambassador to France and Britain for many years. Other novels of this first period are The Arithmetic of Love (Spanish: La aritmética del amor) (1860) and El ideal de un calavera (The Rake's Ideal, 1863).

Upon his retirement from diplomacy, Blest Gana returned to writing novels. Strongly influenced by his reading of the new masters of the form, he produced his best work. Four novels from this second period of creative activity are Durante la reconquista (During the Reconquest, 1897), Los transplantados (The Exiles, 1904), El loco Estero (Estero the Mad, 1909), and Gladys Fairfield (1912). El loco Estero is about the Chile of Blest Gana's childhood. The lively adventure and love intrigue infused with nostalgia qualify this novel as Blest Gana's greatest work.

His literary work - almost exclusively novels - followed the aesthetic ideals and themes of the European Realism, but with a conscious "Americanization" of themes, as a way of making the genre fit (and educational enough) to be read by a national audience. His writings were explicitly influenced by 19th century liberalism, but they are also an attempt to reconcile religious and moral ideals of his time.

Notable among his novels are Martín Rivas (published 1862, about the social rise of a poor, middle-class young man, which is considered the first Chilean novel), El ideal de un Talavera (1863), Durante la Reconquista (1879 historical novel of the period 1814–1817); Los Trasplantados (1906) and El Loco Estero (1909 with pleasant remembrances of childhood). His ability to describe characters and customs has been praised by critics now, as well as at the time of publishing. Despite his non-literary education, which accounts for his careless style and excess of gallicisms, his work is considered fundamental, in terms of their representation of the customs, morals and ideals of 19th century Chileans. Martin Rivas was translated into English by Tess O'Dwyer and published by Oxford University Press in 2000. He also wrote a comedy: El jefe de familia (1858).

His brother Guillermo Blest Gana was a noted poet and author.

Alberto Blest Gana died, aged 90, in Paris.

== See also ==
- War of the Pacific
- The Gold Rush
- Latin American Literature
