= Anders Zorn =

Swedish painter and engraver (1860–1920)

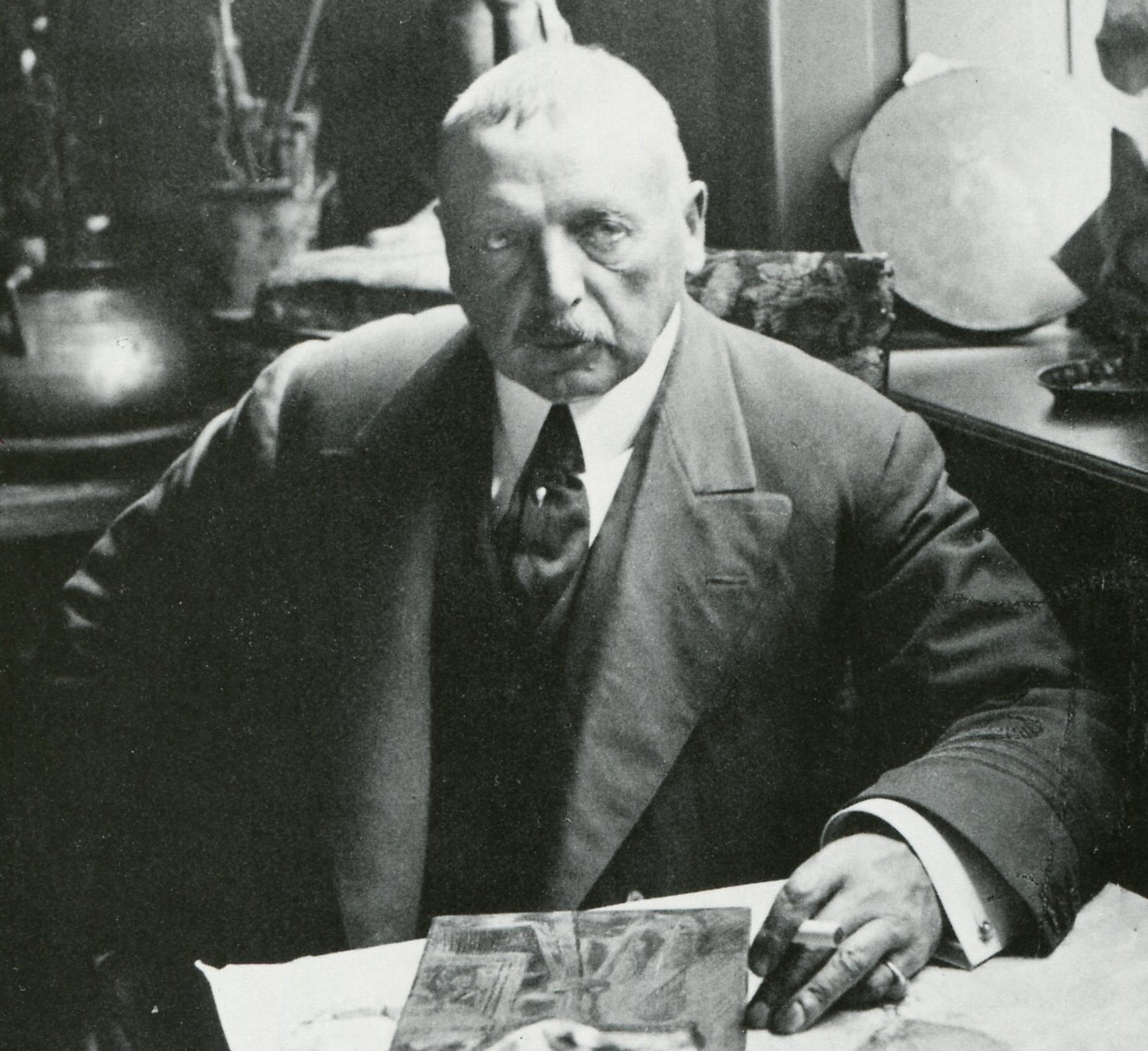
- Zorn in 1908
- Born: Anders Leonard Zorn; 18 February 1860; Utmeland, Mora, Sweden–Norway
- Died: 22 August 1920 (aged 60); Stockholm, Sweden
- Education: Royal Swedish Academy of Arts, Stockholm
- Known for: Painting; Sculpture; Printmaker in etching
- Spouse: Emma Lamm

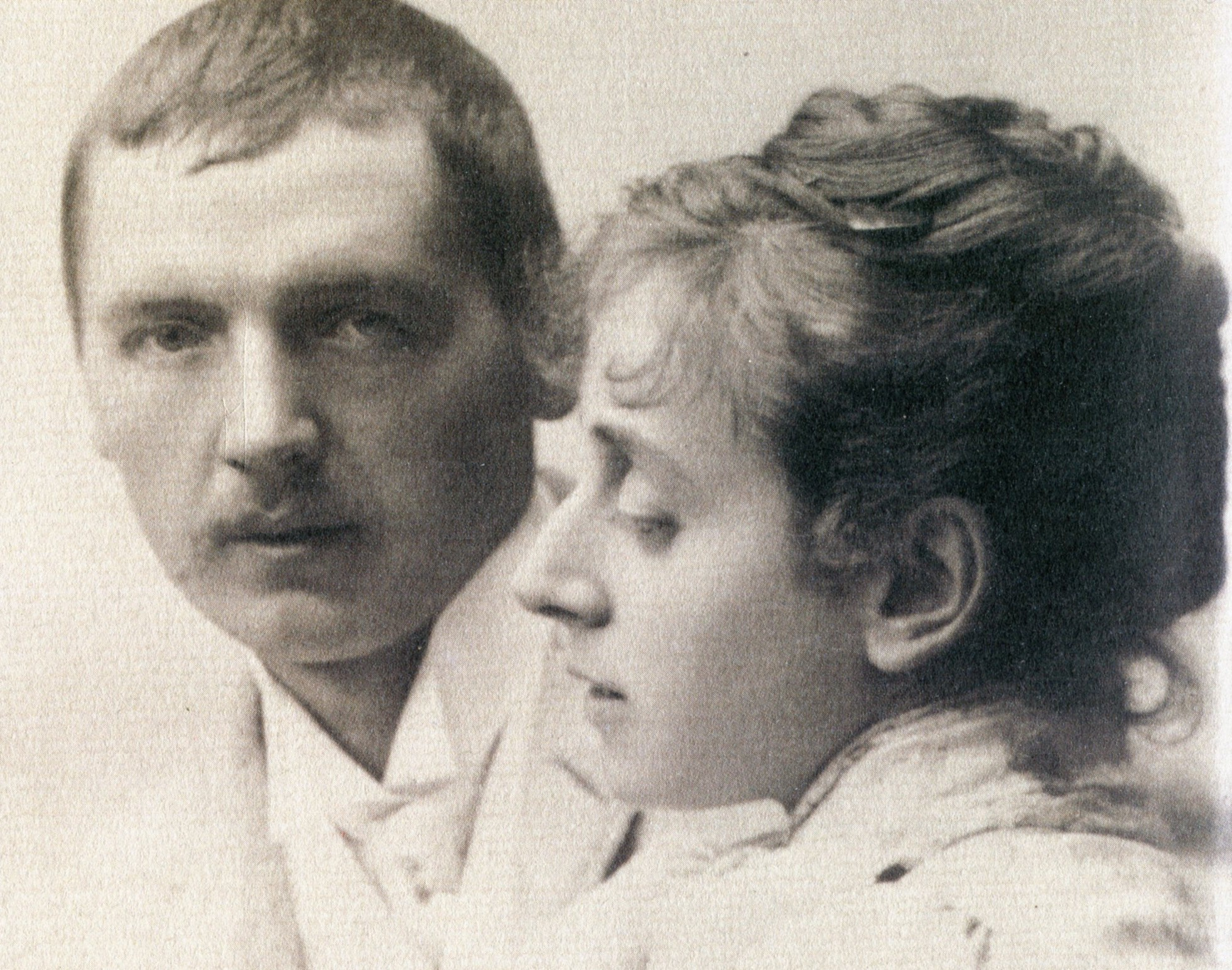
Anders and Emma Zorn around 1885.

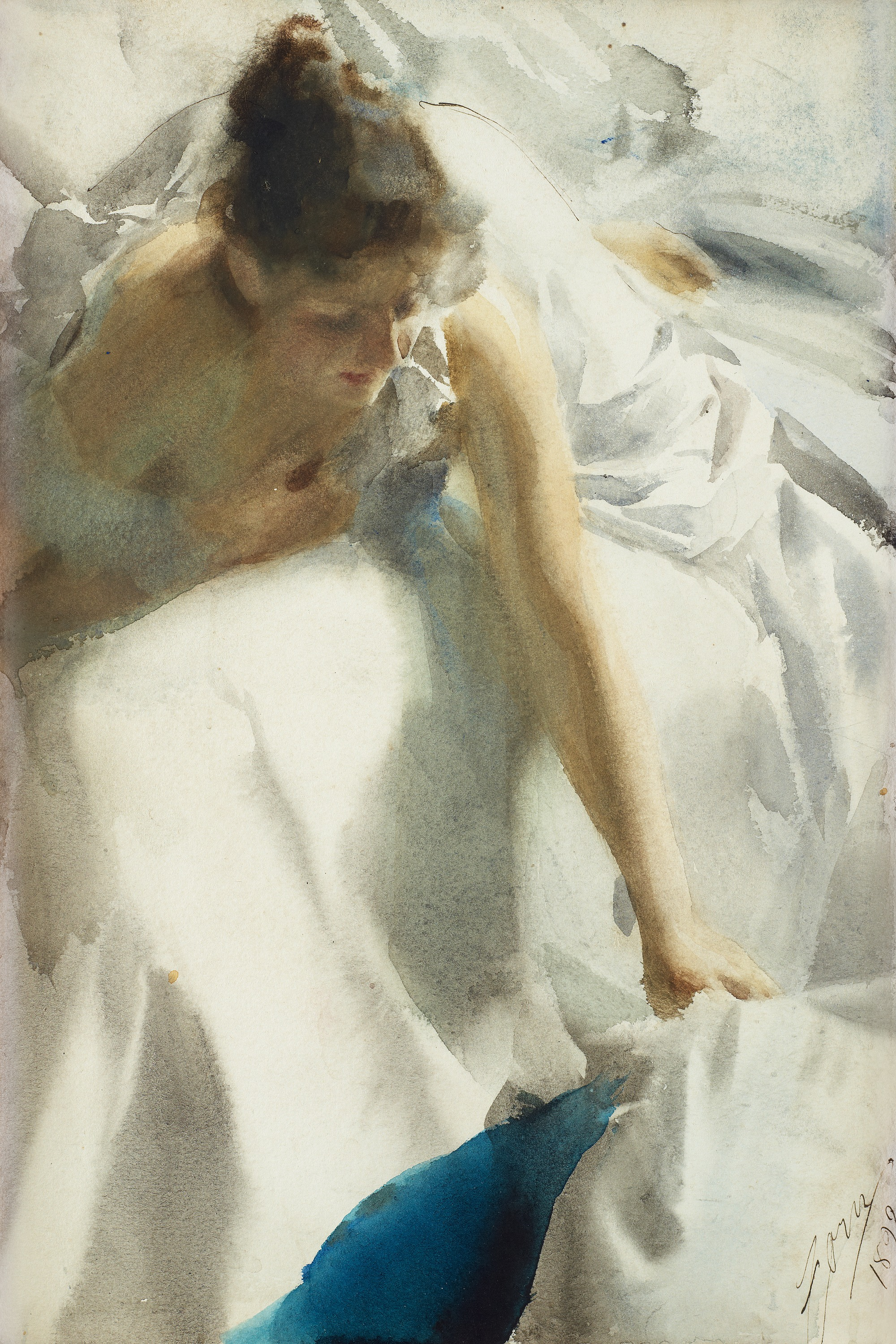
Reveil (Awakening), the artist's wife

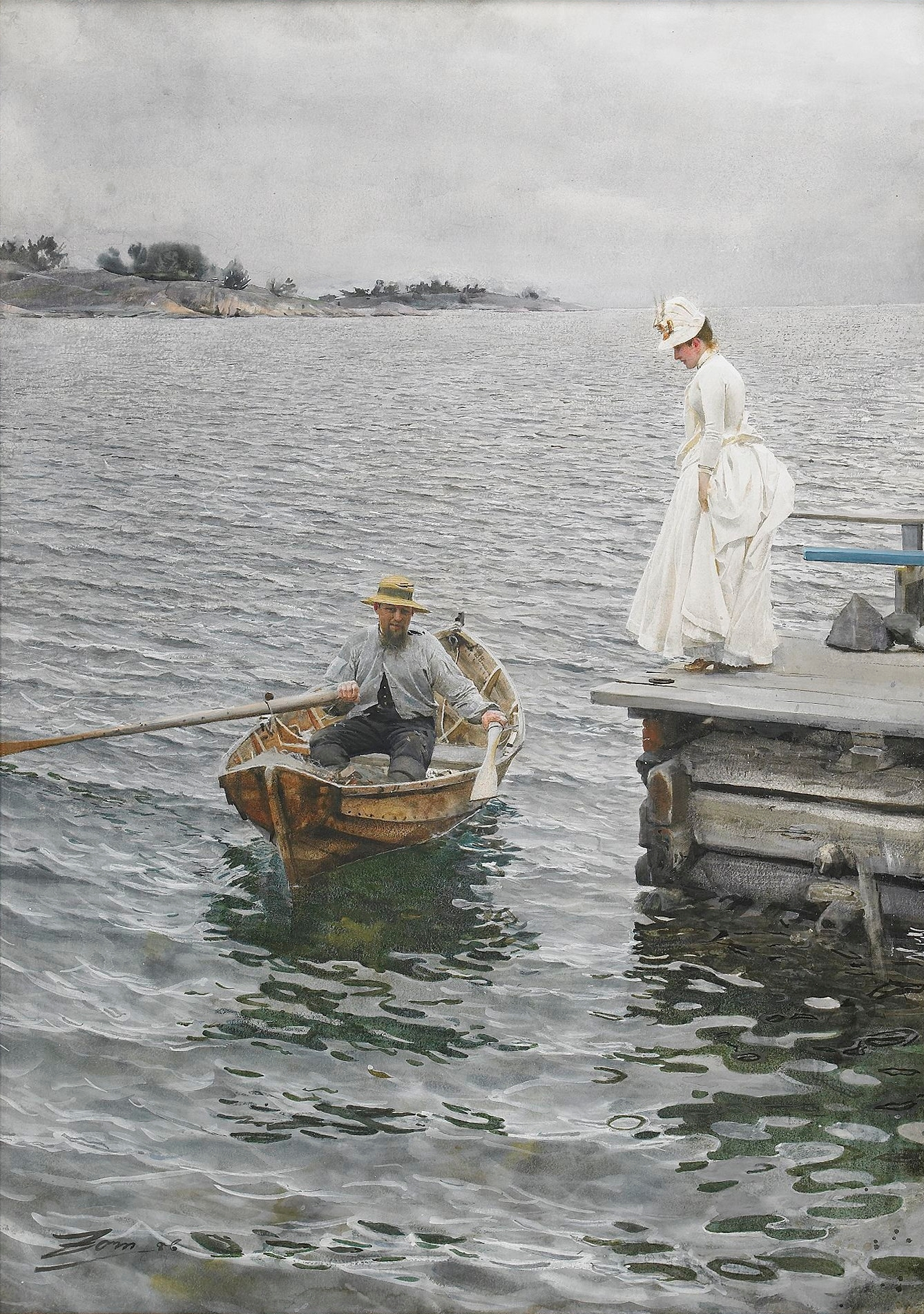
Sommarnöje, 1886. Sweden's highest priced painting ever; sold for 26 million SEK on June 3, 2010.

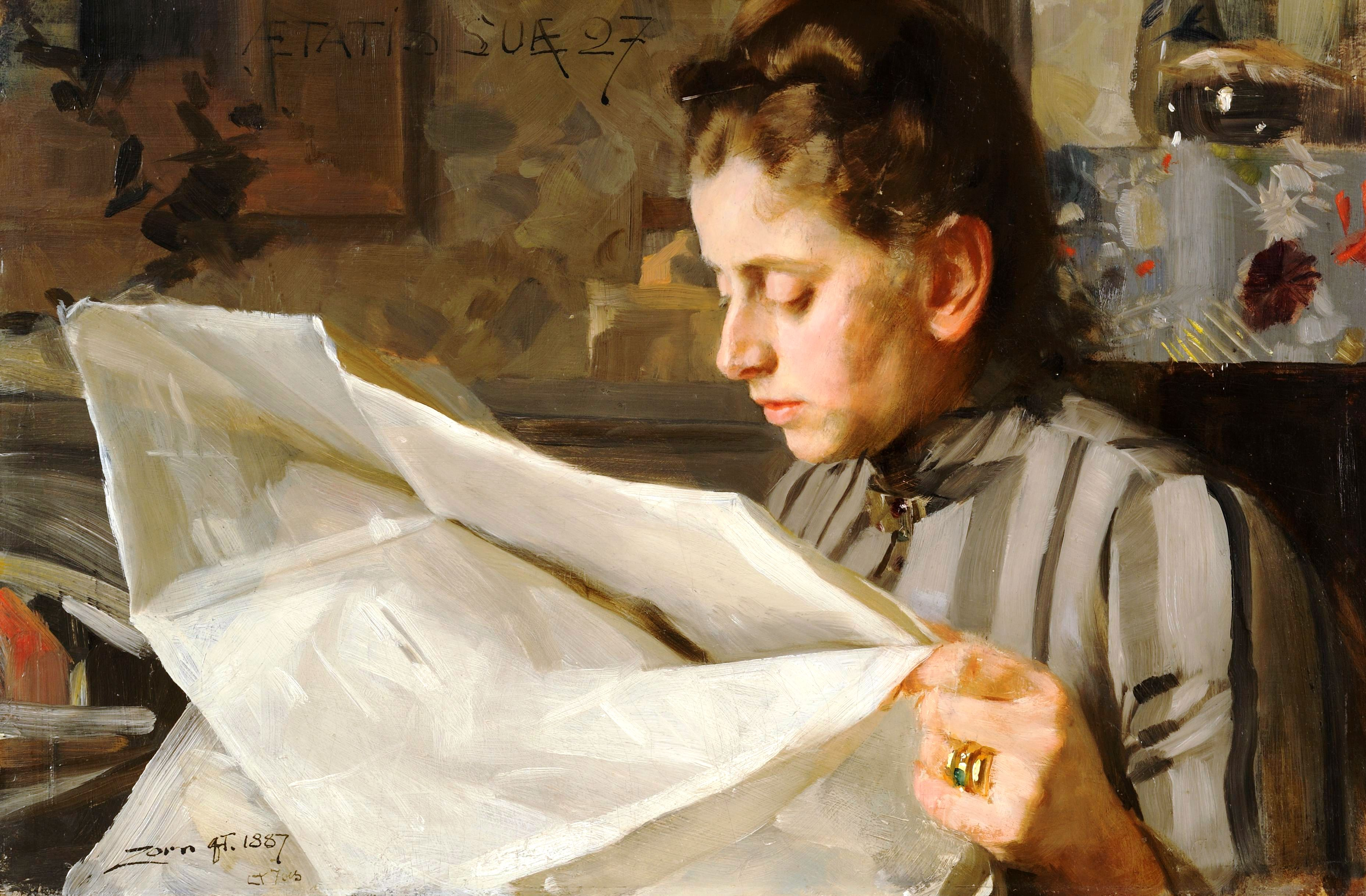
Emma Zorn, reading, 1887

Anders Leonard Zorn (18 February 1860 – 22 August 1920) was a Swedish artist who attained international success as a painter, sculptor, and etching artist. His portrait subjects include King Oscar II of Sweden and three American Presidents: Grover Cleveland, William H. Taft, and Theodore Roosevelt. At the end of his life in 1920, he established the Swedish literary Bellman Prize.

== Family, education and travels ==
Zorn was born and raised on his grandparents' farm in Yvraden, a hamlet near the village of Utmeland in the parish of Mora, Dalarna. He studied until the age of twelve in the school at Mora Strand before progressing in the autumn of 1872 to a secondary grammar school in Enköping.

From 1875 to 1880, Zorn studied at the Royal Swedish Academy of Arts in Stockholm, where he amazed his teachers with his talent. Members of the Stockholm Society approached him with commissions. In early 1881, Zorn met Emma Lamm, whose background was quite different from his. Emma Lamm was from a wealthy Jewish merchant family. She was interested in art and culture and, after a long engagement, they were married in a civil ceremony in October 1885.

Zorn traveled extensively, to London, Paris, the Balkans, Spain, Italy, and the United States. During the 1890s in Paris, he spent much time with the Finn Albert Edelfelt. He became an international success and one of the most highly regarded painters of his era. It was primarily his skill as a portrait painter that gained Zorn international acclaim, based principally upon his incisive ability to depict the individual character of his model.

== Honors ==
At the age of 29, he was made a Chevalier de la Légion d'honneur at the Exposition Universelle 1889 Paris World Fair.

Portrait paintings

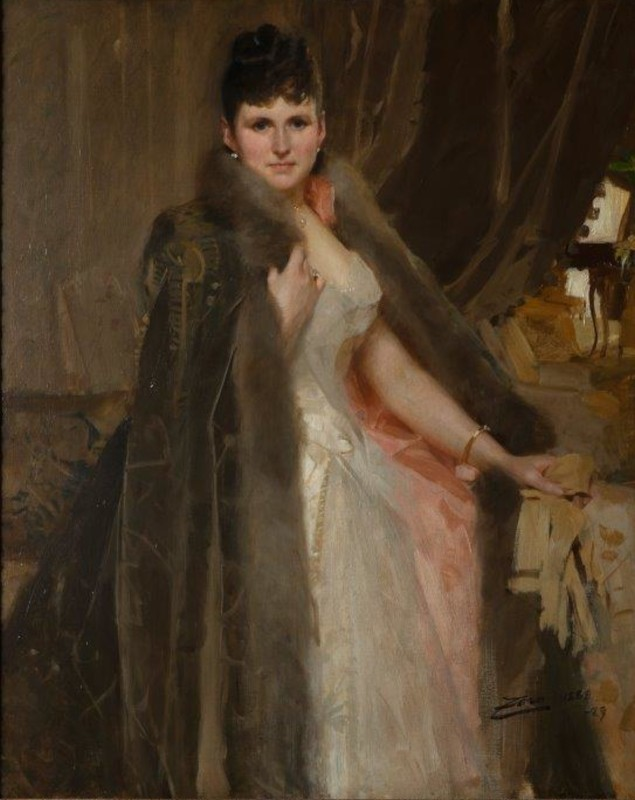
Mrs. Symons, 1886

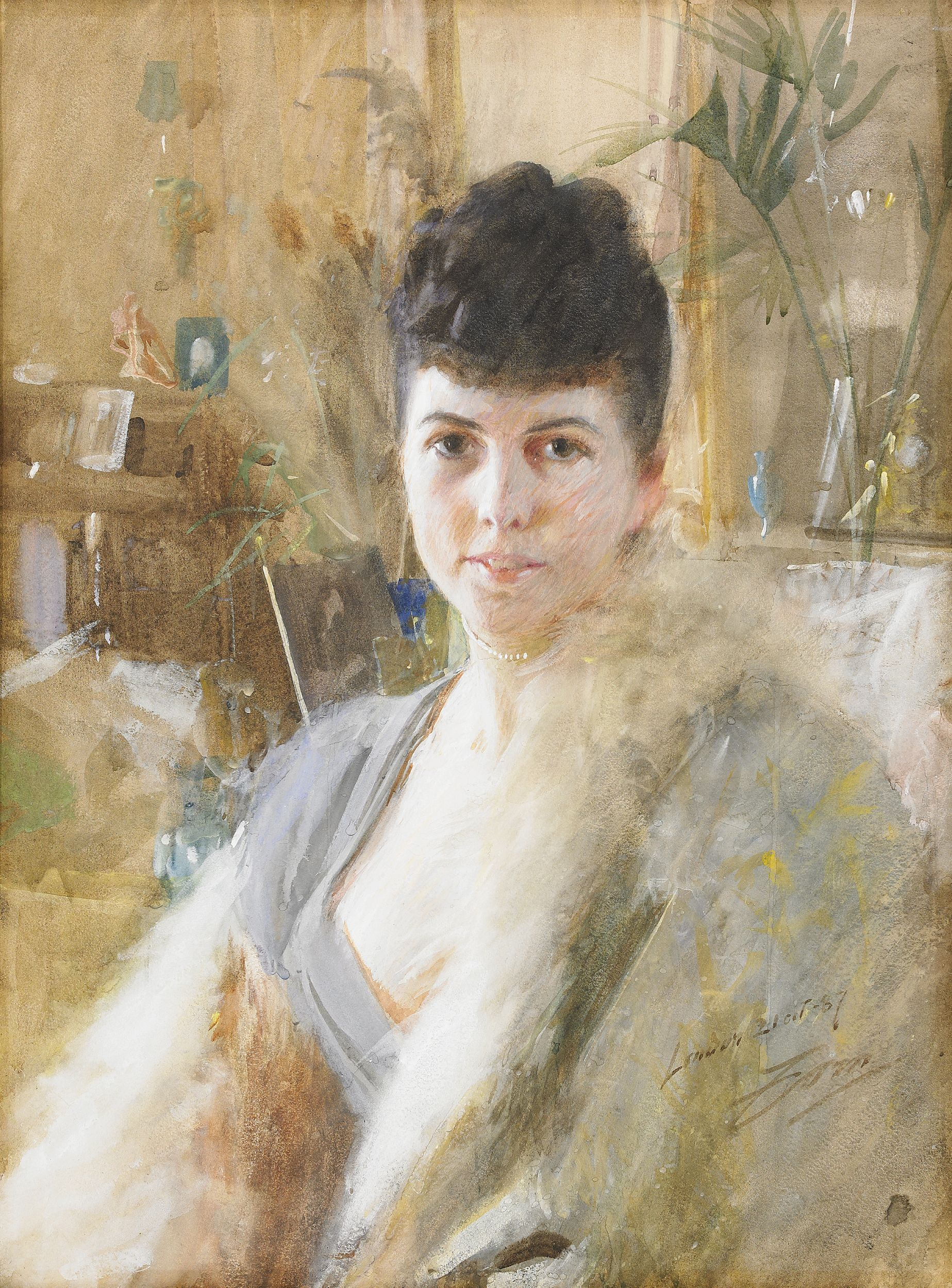
Lady with fur cape, 1887

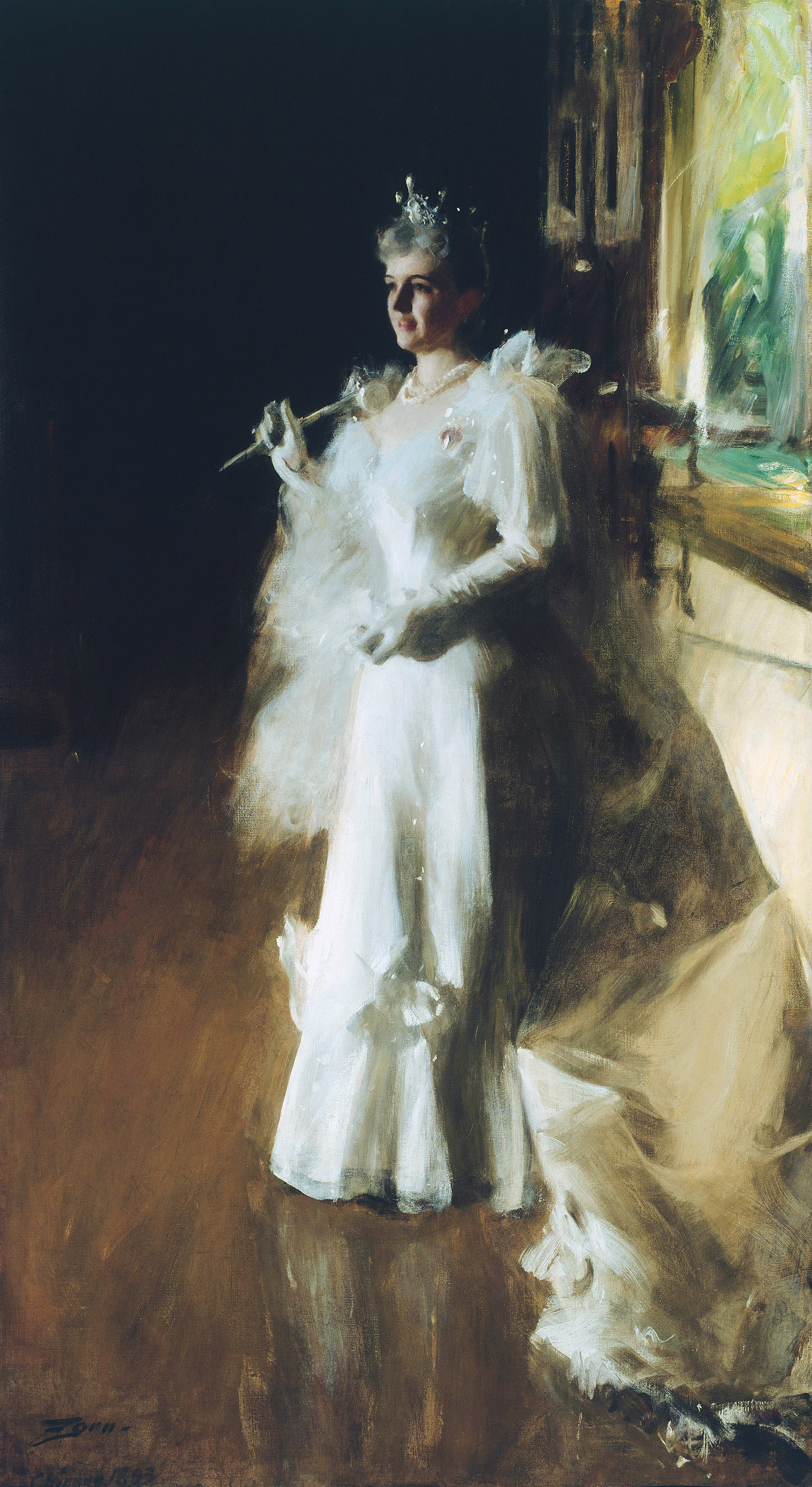
Mrs. Potter Palmer, 1893

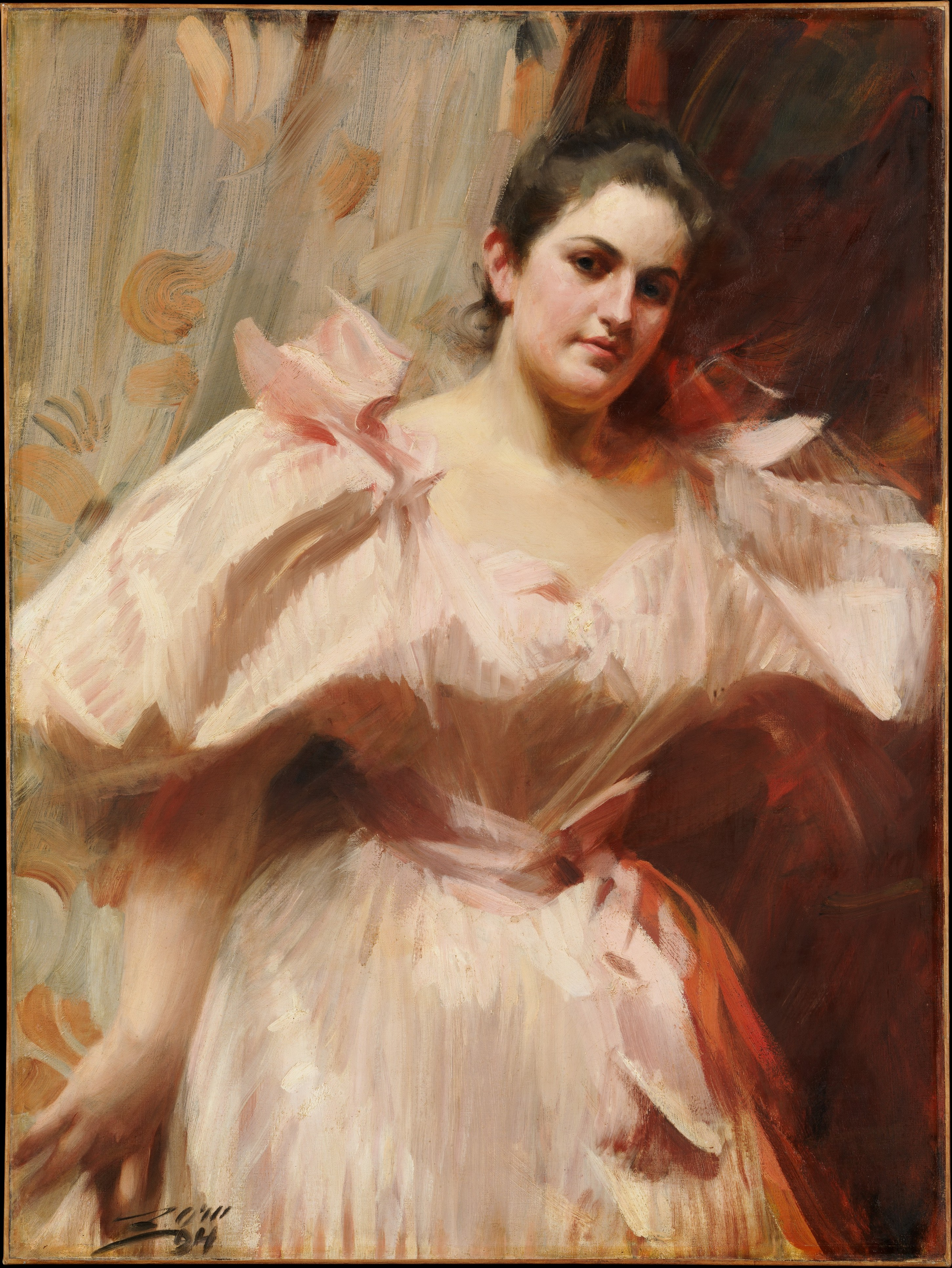
Portrait Frieda Schiff, 1894, wife of Felix M. Warburg

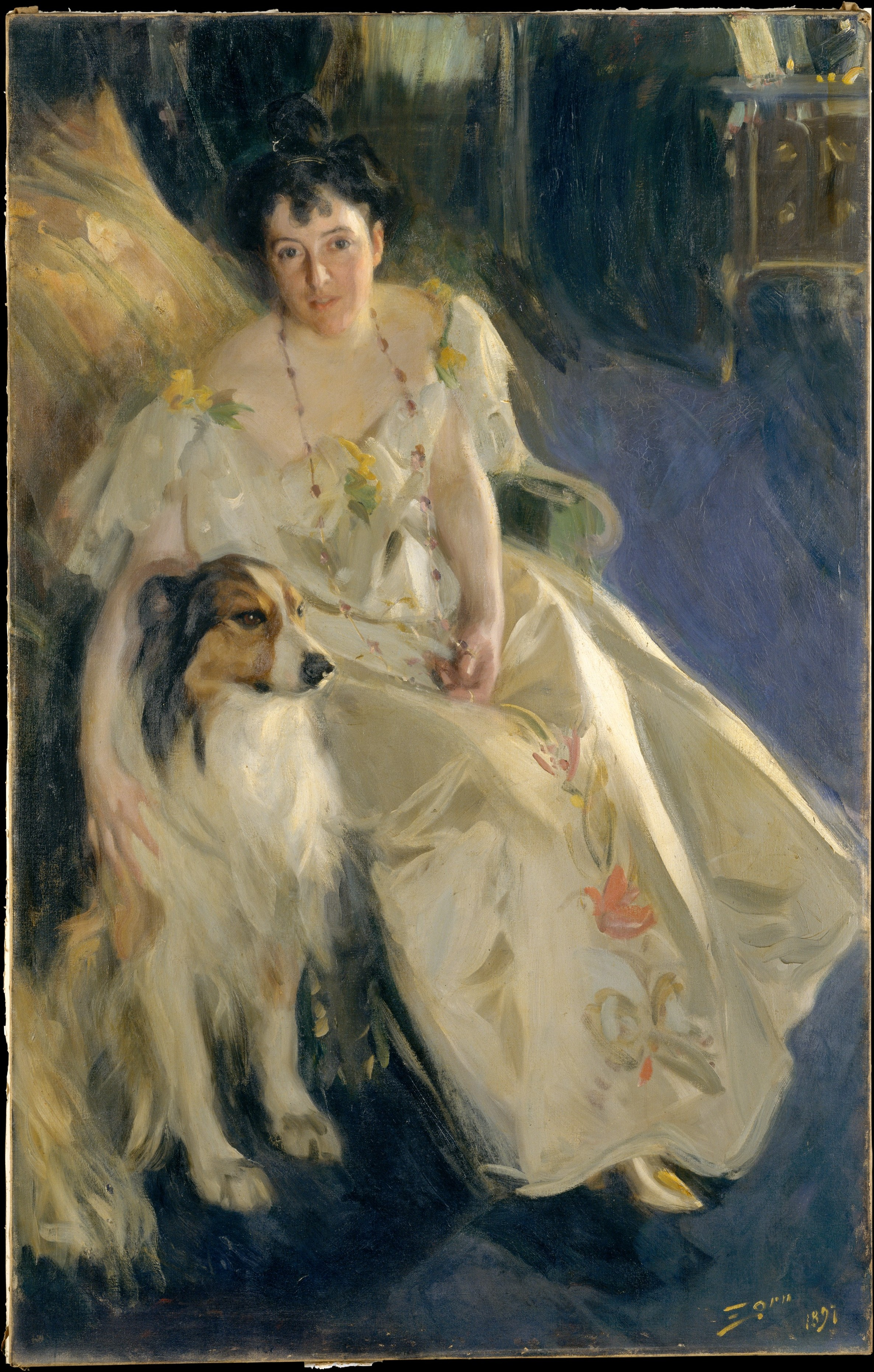
Mrs. Walter Rathbone Bacon, 1897

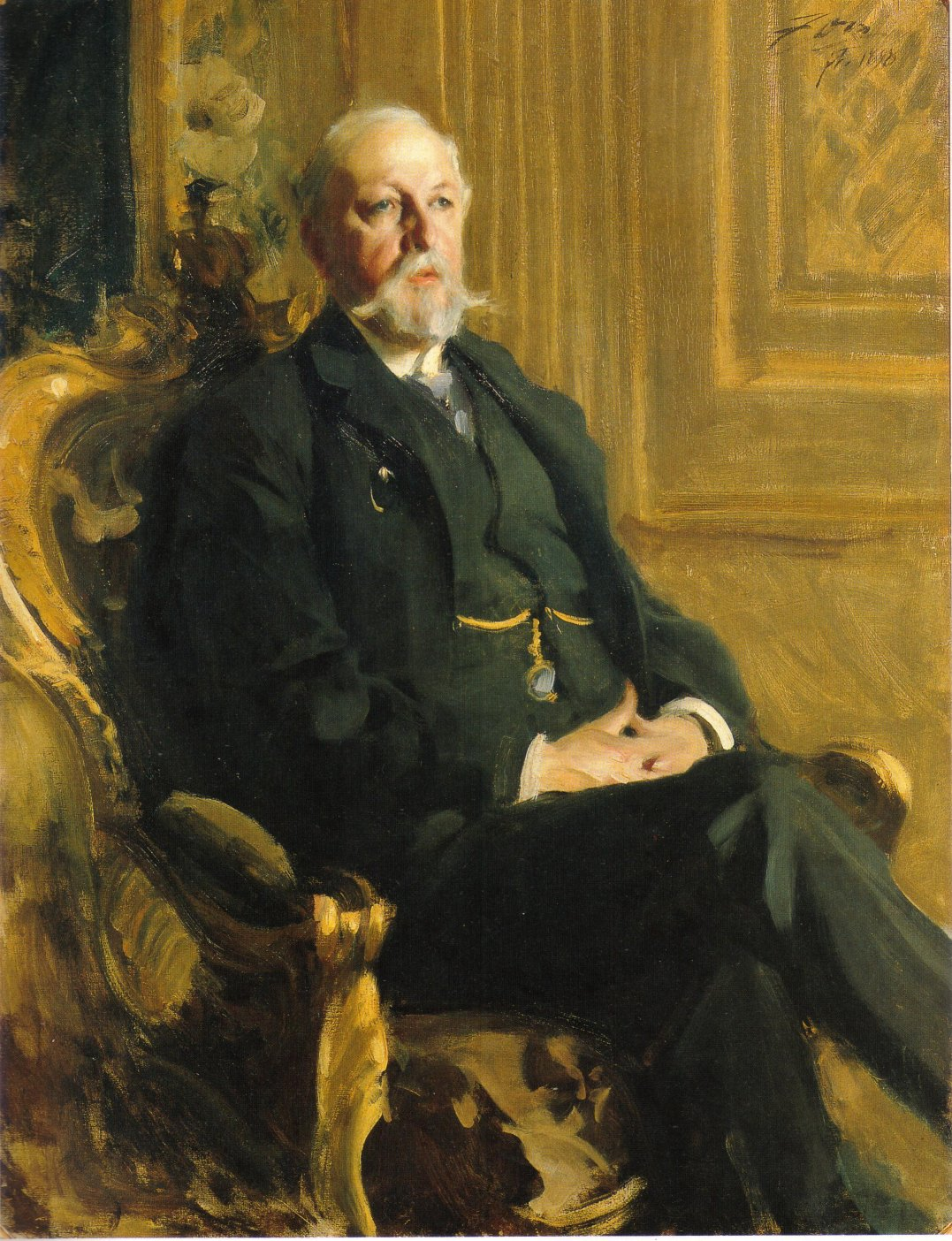
The King of Sweden, King Oscar II , 1898

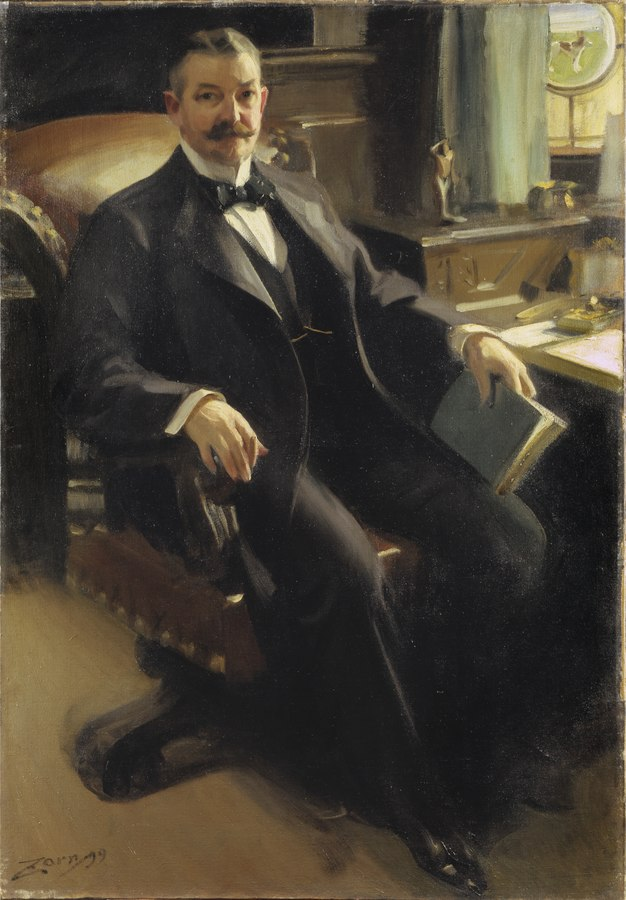
Mr Henry Clay Pierce, a noted financier and oil industry pioneer, 1899

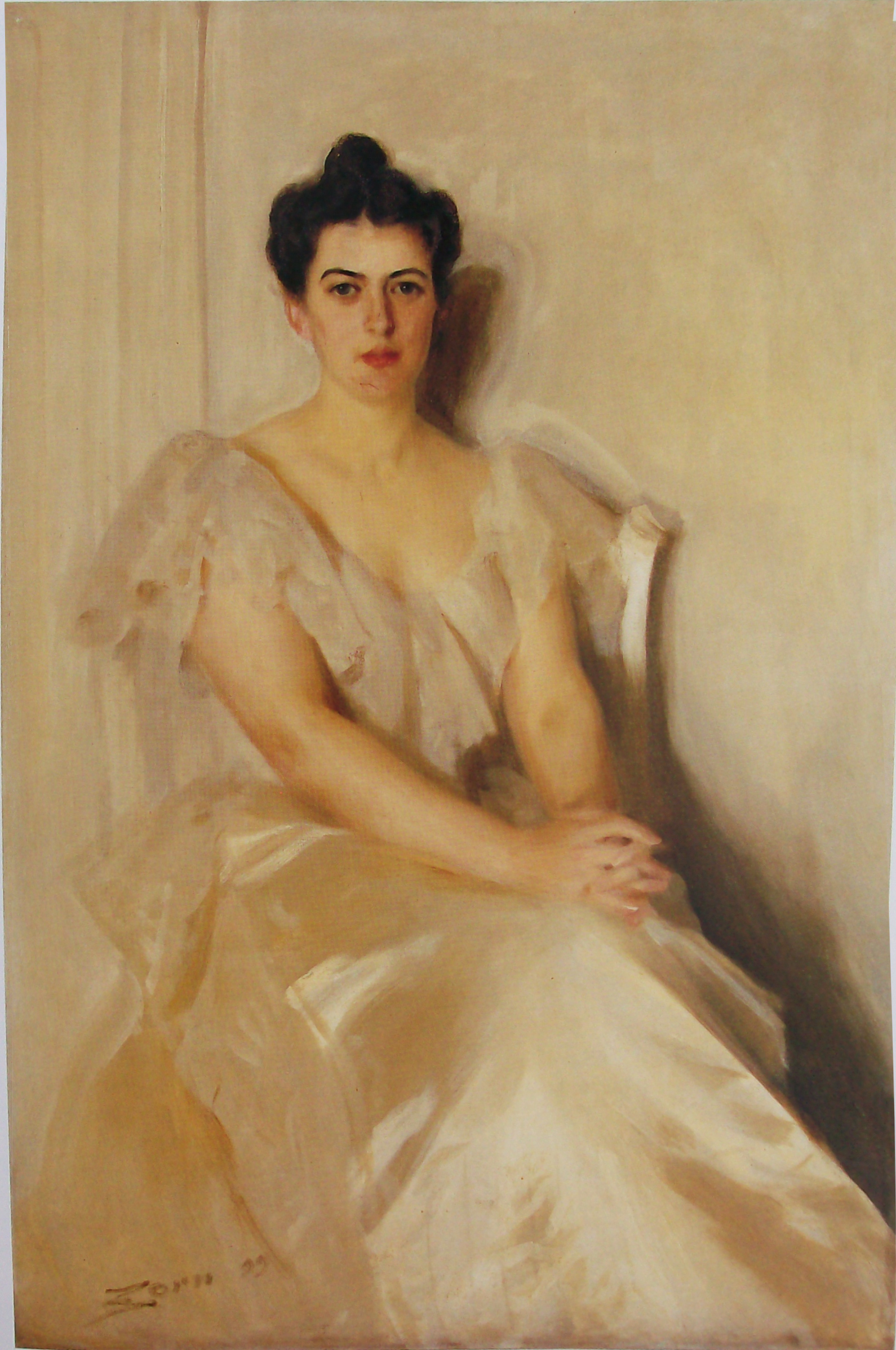
Frances Cleveland, wife of President Grover Cleveland, 1899

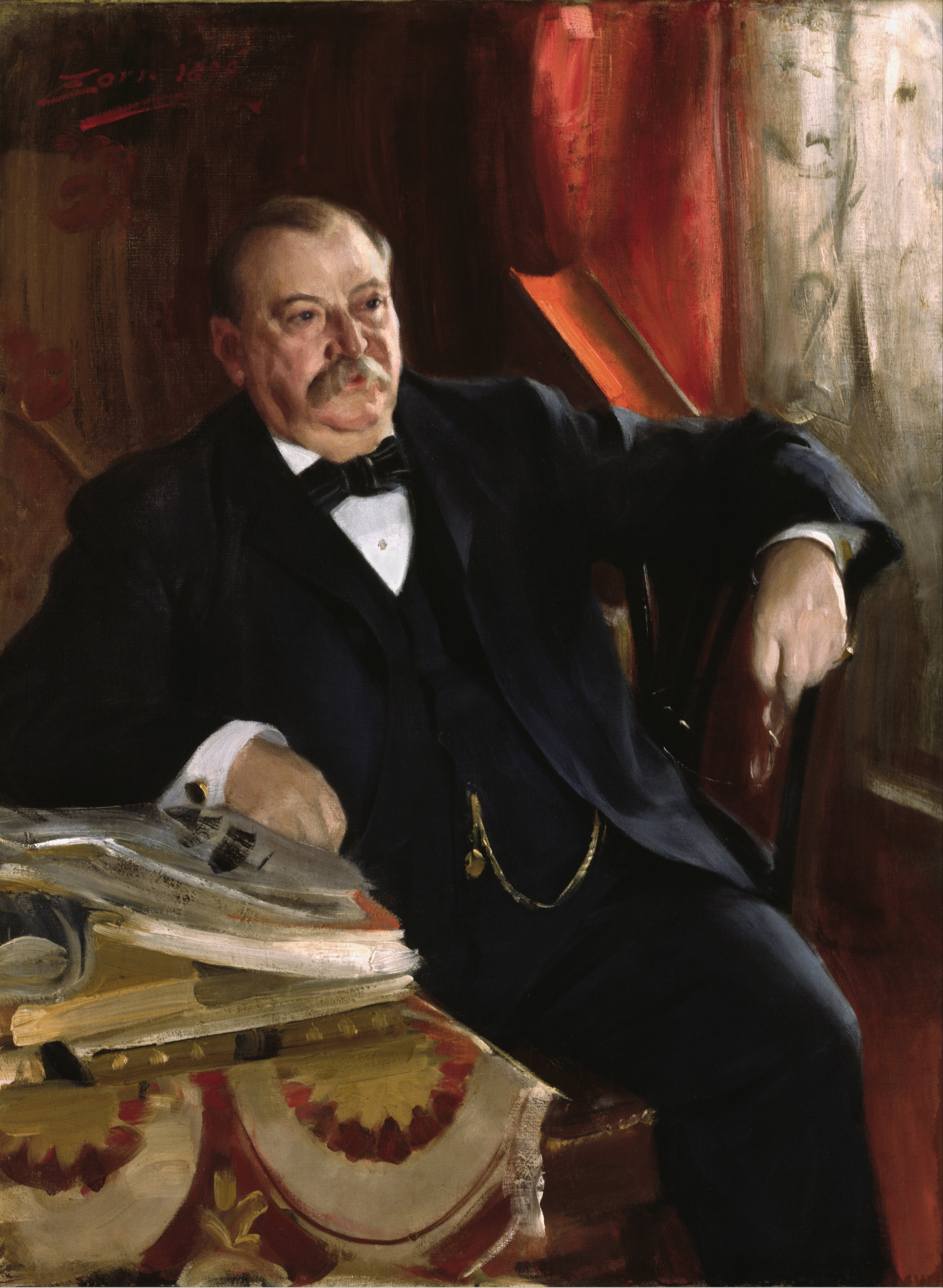
President Grover Cleveland, 1899

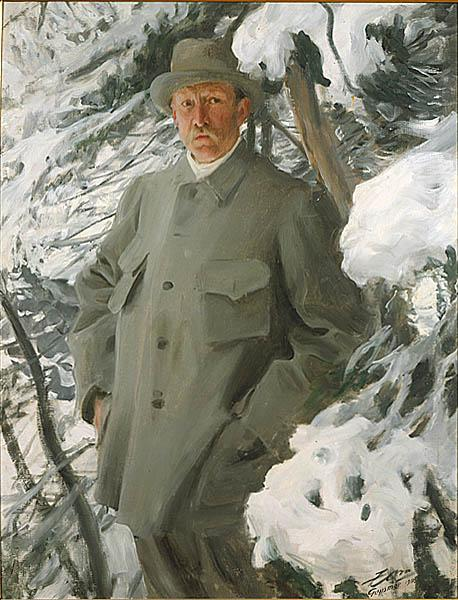
The Painter Bruno Liljefors, 1906

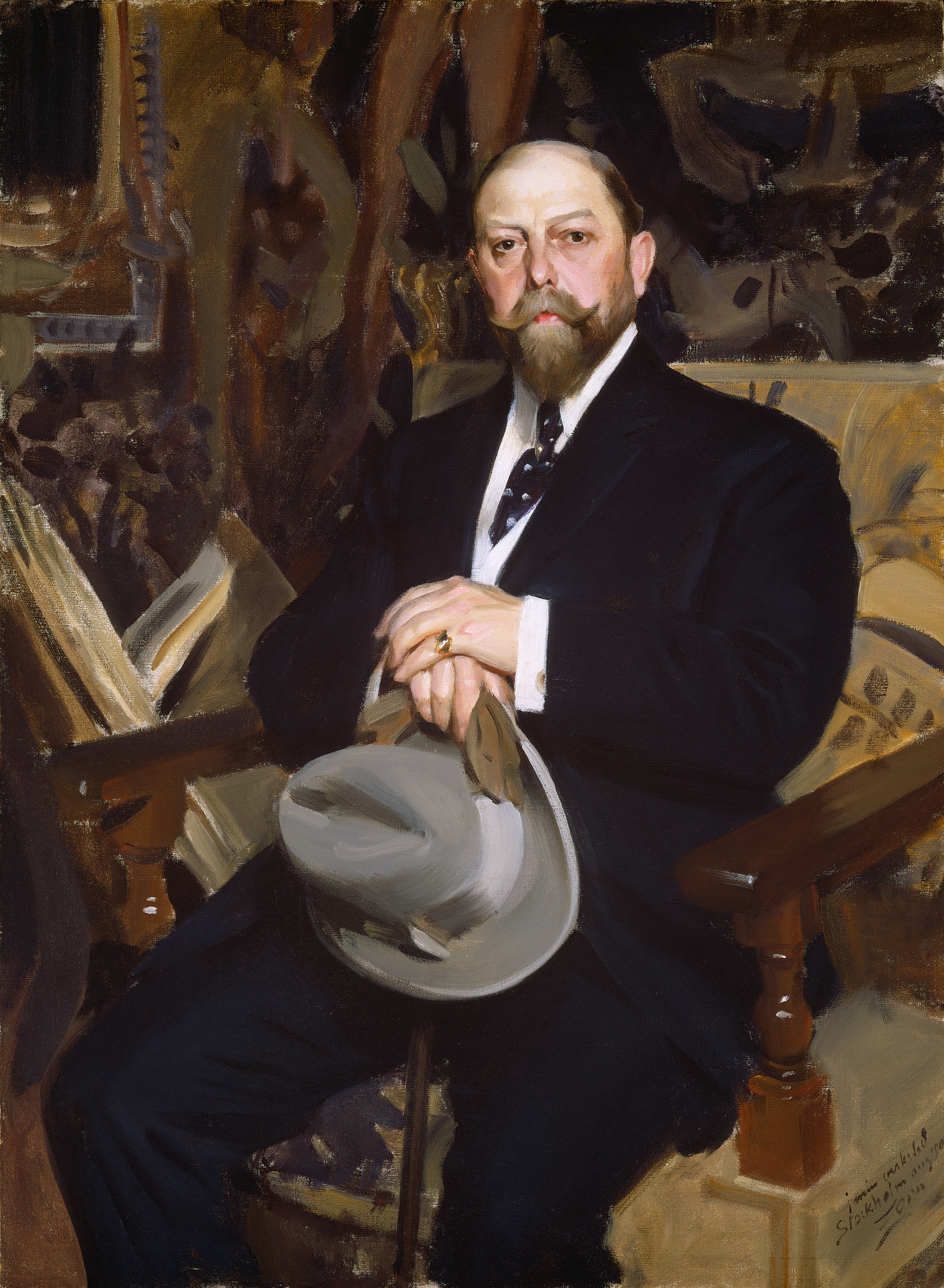
Hugo Reisinger holding a fashionable grey Homburg hat, 1907

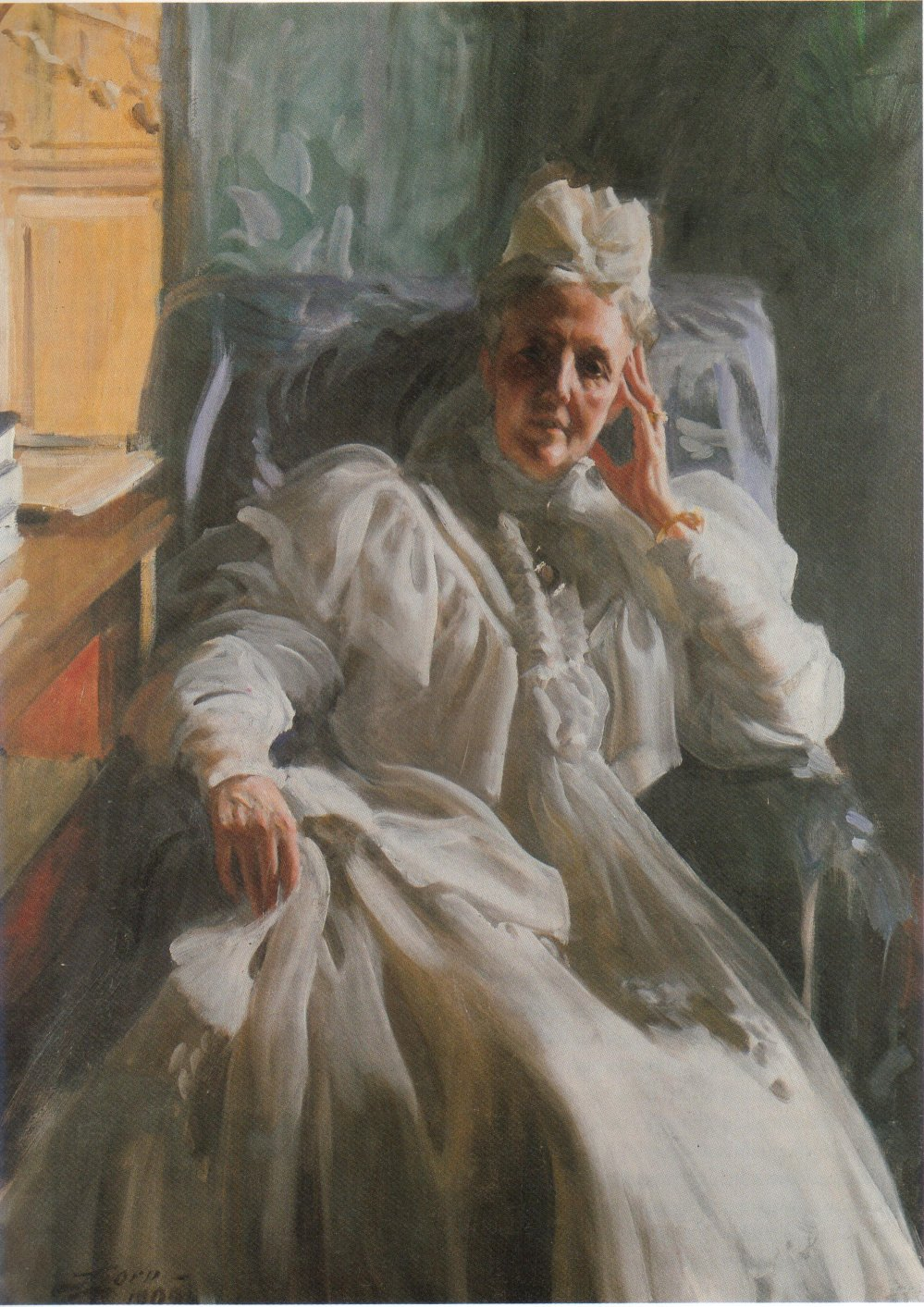
The Queen consort of Sweden and Norway, Queen Sophia, 1909

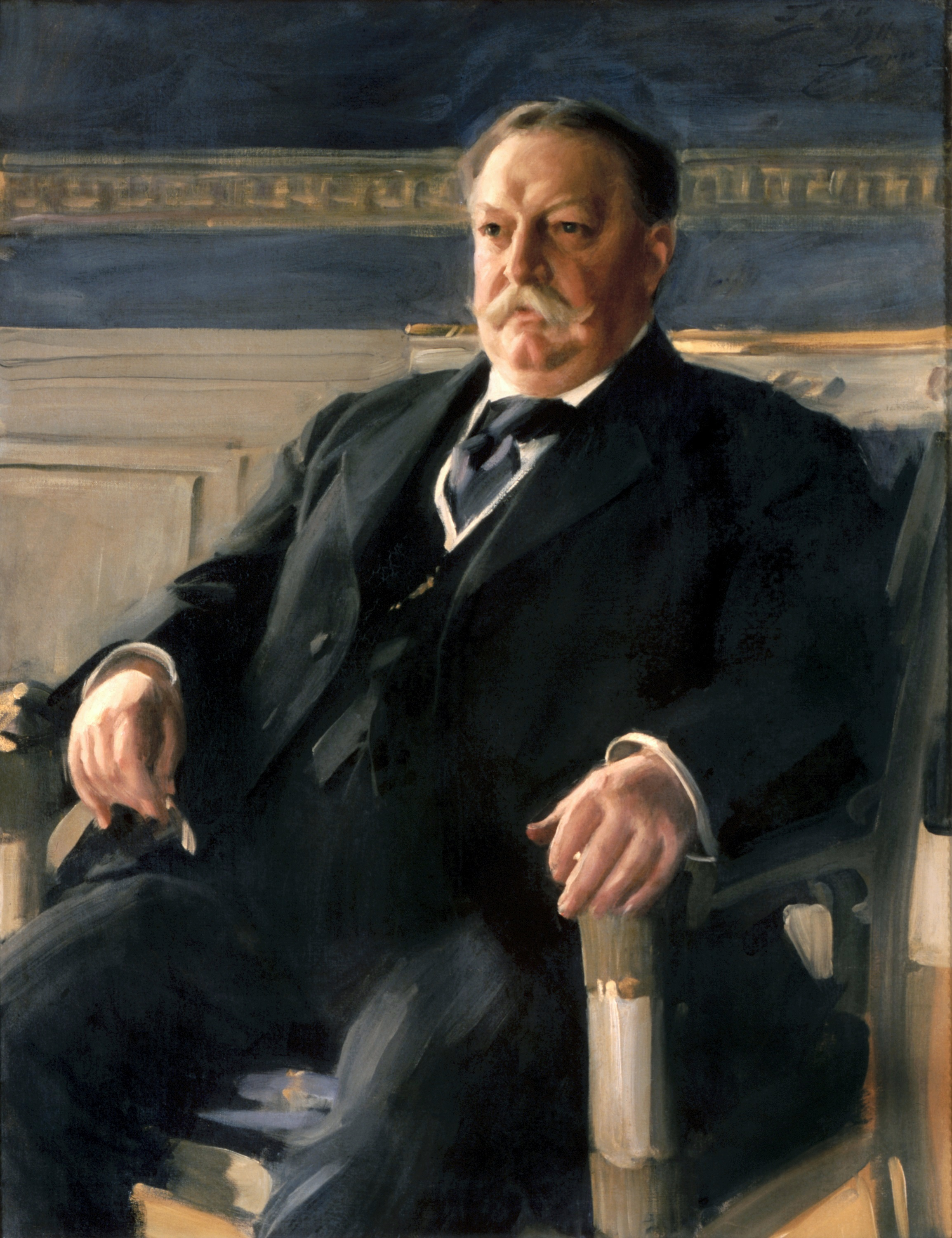
William Howard Taft, 27th President of the United States, 1911

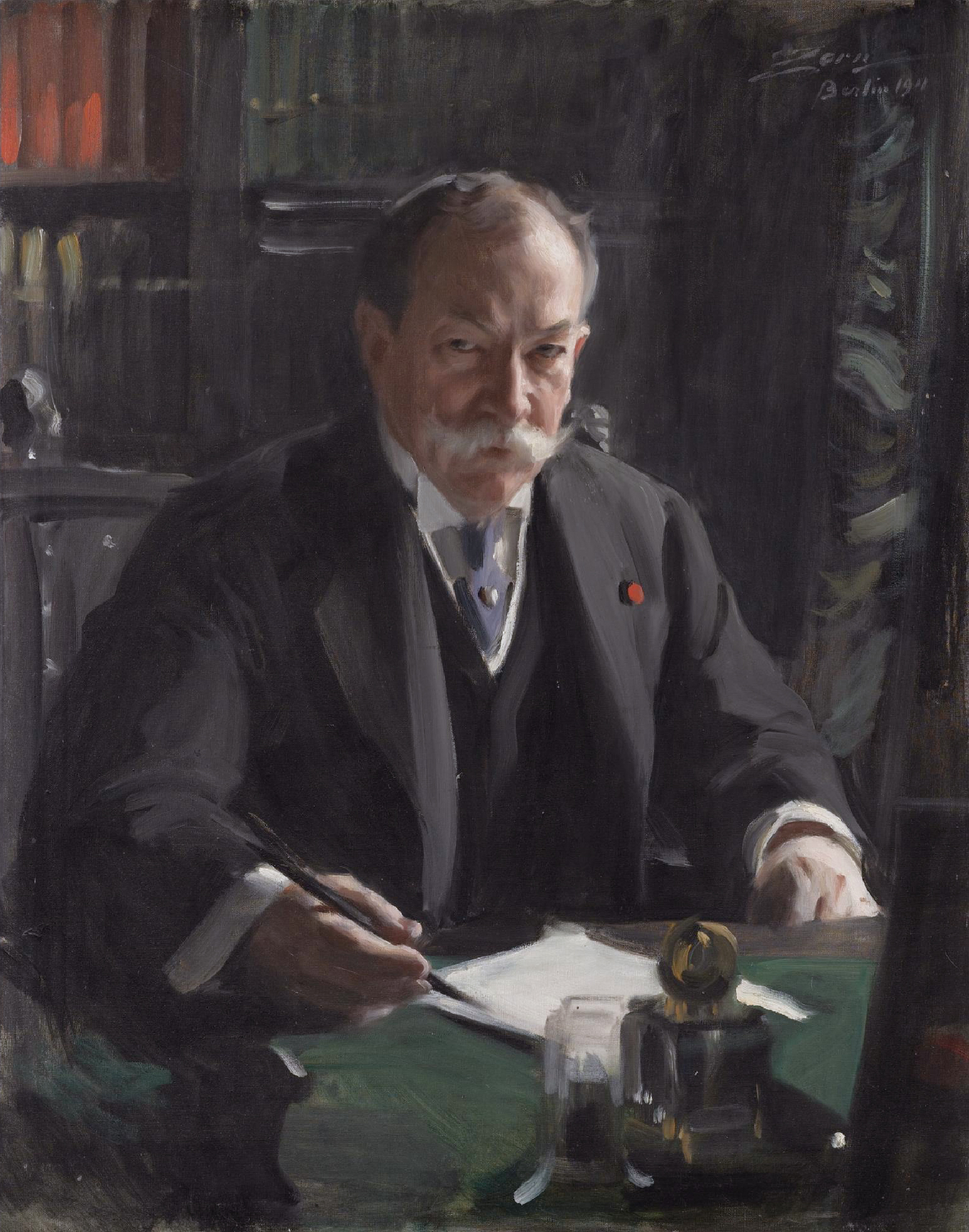
Ambassador David Jayne Hill, 1911

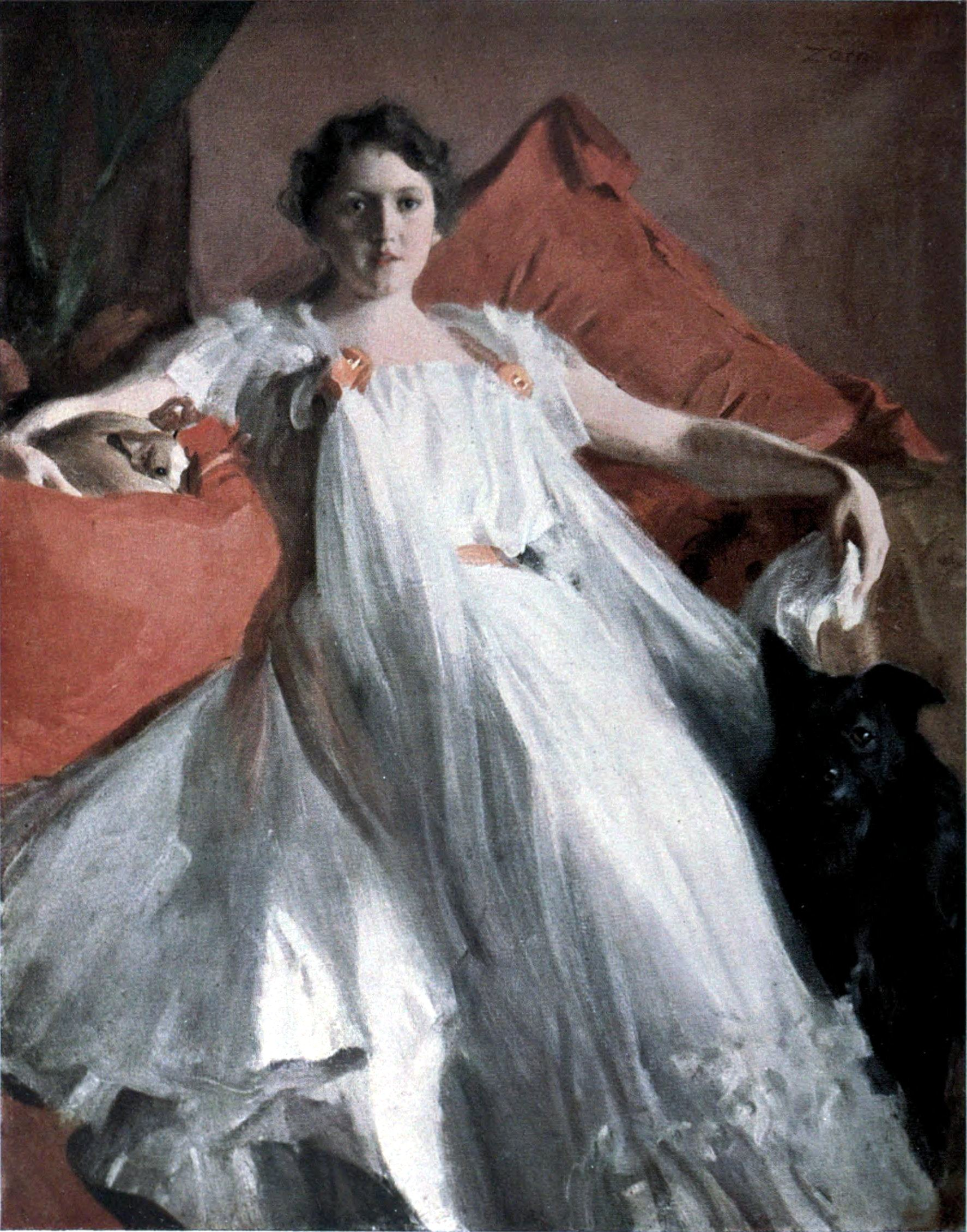
Mme Ashley, 1920

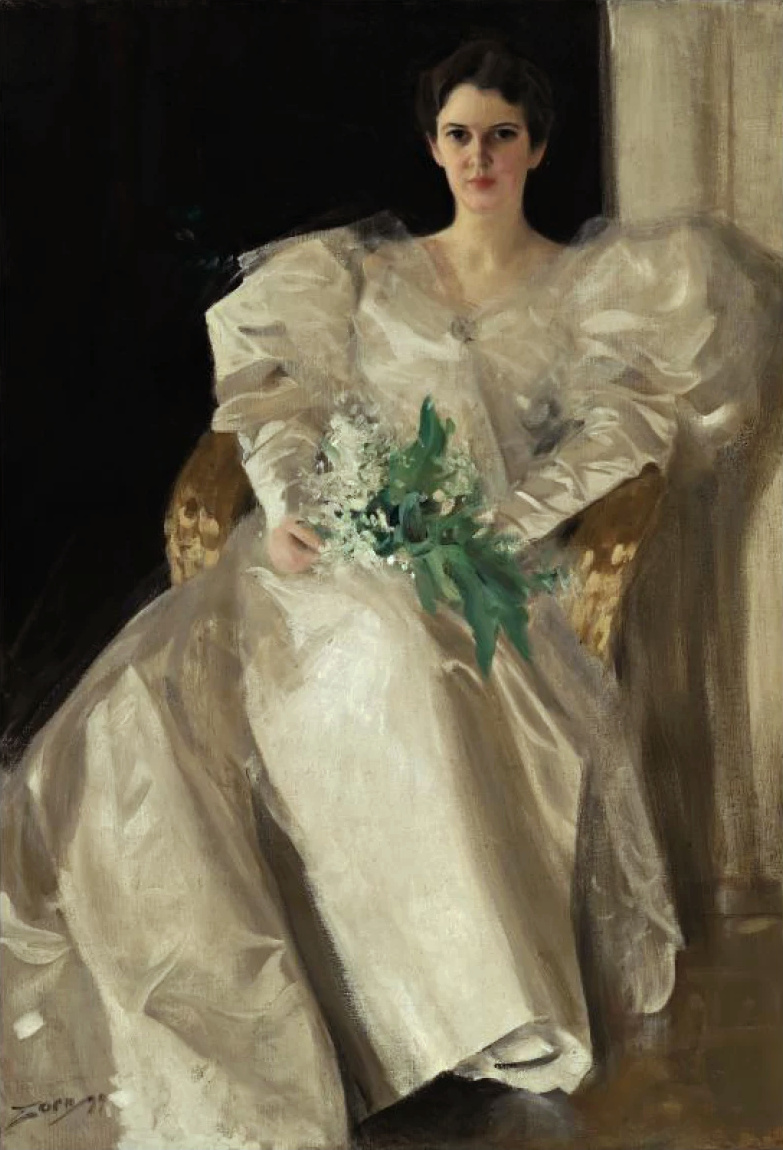
Mrs. Eben Richards, 1920

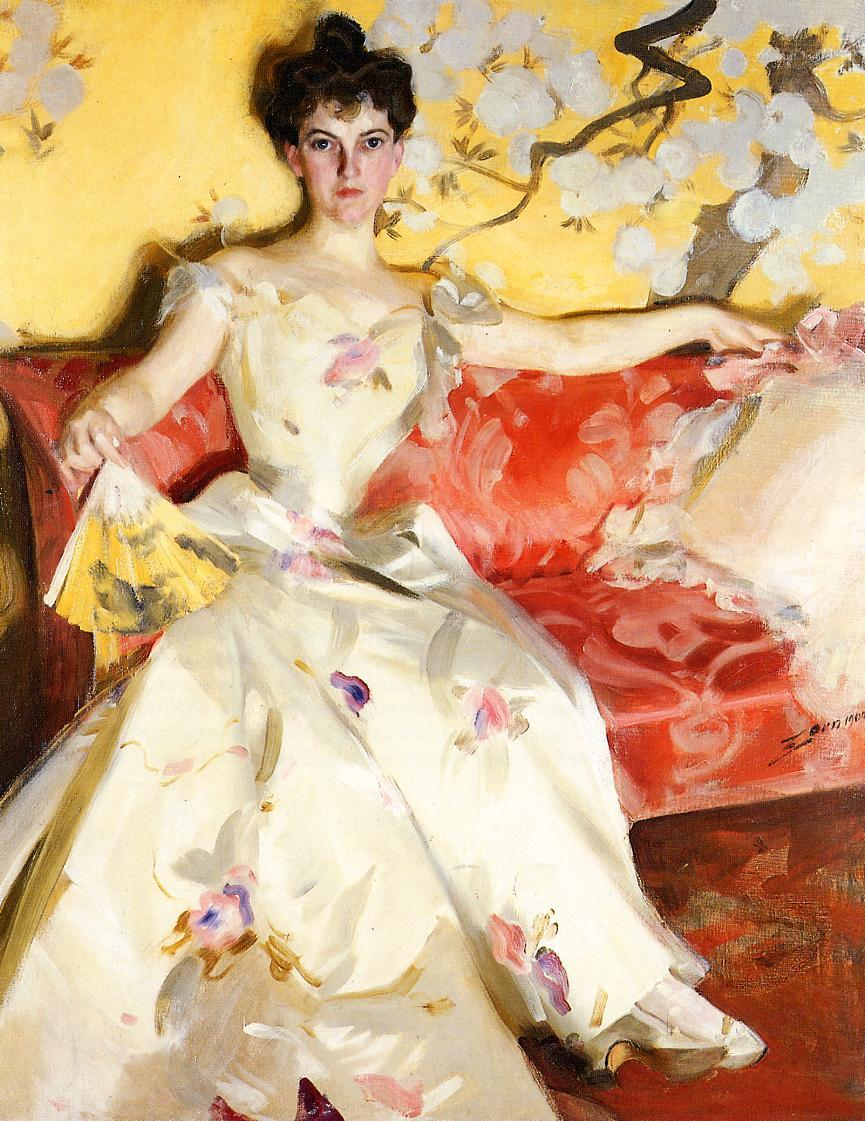
Elizabeth Sherman Cameron, 1900

== Collection ==
Zorn's art made him wealthy and he was thus able to build up a considerable collection of art. The objects were not only bought in his native country but also during the many travels he made abroad. In their joint will, Anders and Emma Zorn donated their entire holdings to the Swedish State.

Some of his most important works can be seen at the National Museum of Fine Arts (Swedish: Nationalmuseum) in Stockholm. Among them is Midsummer Dance (1897), a depiction of dancers in the evening light of a rural Midsummer's Eve celebration. Other museums holding major works by Zorn include the Musée d'Orsay in Paris, the Metropolitan Museum of Art in New York, and the Museum of Fine Arts, Boston. The Zorn Collections (Swedish: Zornsamlingarna) located in Mora and Garberg, Älvdalen, consist of four museums dedicated to the life and works of Anders Zorn. The main museum – Zornmuseet – was designed by Ragnar Östberg and opened in 1939. Shown there are extensive works of Zorn and his collected art by Rembrandt Harmensz van Rijn, 'The Hovingham Master' (Poussin's follower), Bruno Liljefors, Albert Edelfelt, and Pehr Hilleström.

The Bellman Prize (Bellmanpriset) is a literature prize for "an outstanding Swedish poet", every year awarded by the Swedish Academy. The prize was established by Anders Zorn and his wife Emma in 1920.

== Zorngården ==
In 1886, Anders Zorn and his wife, Emma, bought land close to Mora church and here they moved to a cottage from his maternal grandfather's farm. When Anders and Emma Zorn decided to return to Sweden after several years abroad, they began to enlarge the cottage. Zorngården, the Zorn combined smallholding, farmstead, and residence, was completed in 1910.

Zorngården remains today much as it was at the time of Emma Zorn's death in 1942. It is an accurate example of an artist's home from the early years of the 20th century. With inspiration from English and Swedish architecture, it stands today as an accurate example of the architectural freedom that characterizes the years around 1900.

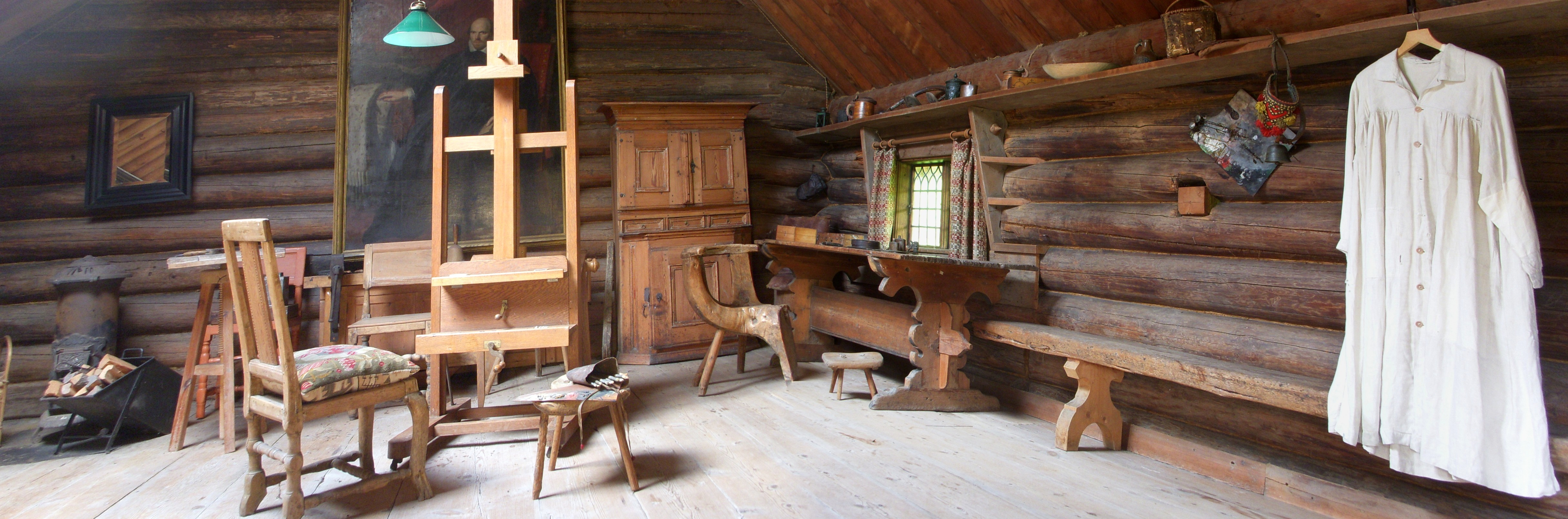
Anders Zorn's atelier at his house, Zorngården in Mora

The main part of Zorngården consists of Zorn's home and a museum with his art, but there are two other museums that also are part of the Zorn Collections. Gammelgården is in the southern part of Mora and consists of some 40 timber houses that Zorn bought to make sure that the old art of building such houses would not be forgotten. Gopsmor, Zorn's refuge when under stress, is in the municipality of Älvdalen and is only open for visitors in July.

Self Portraits

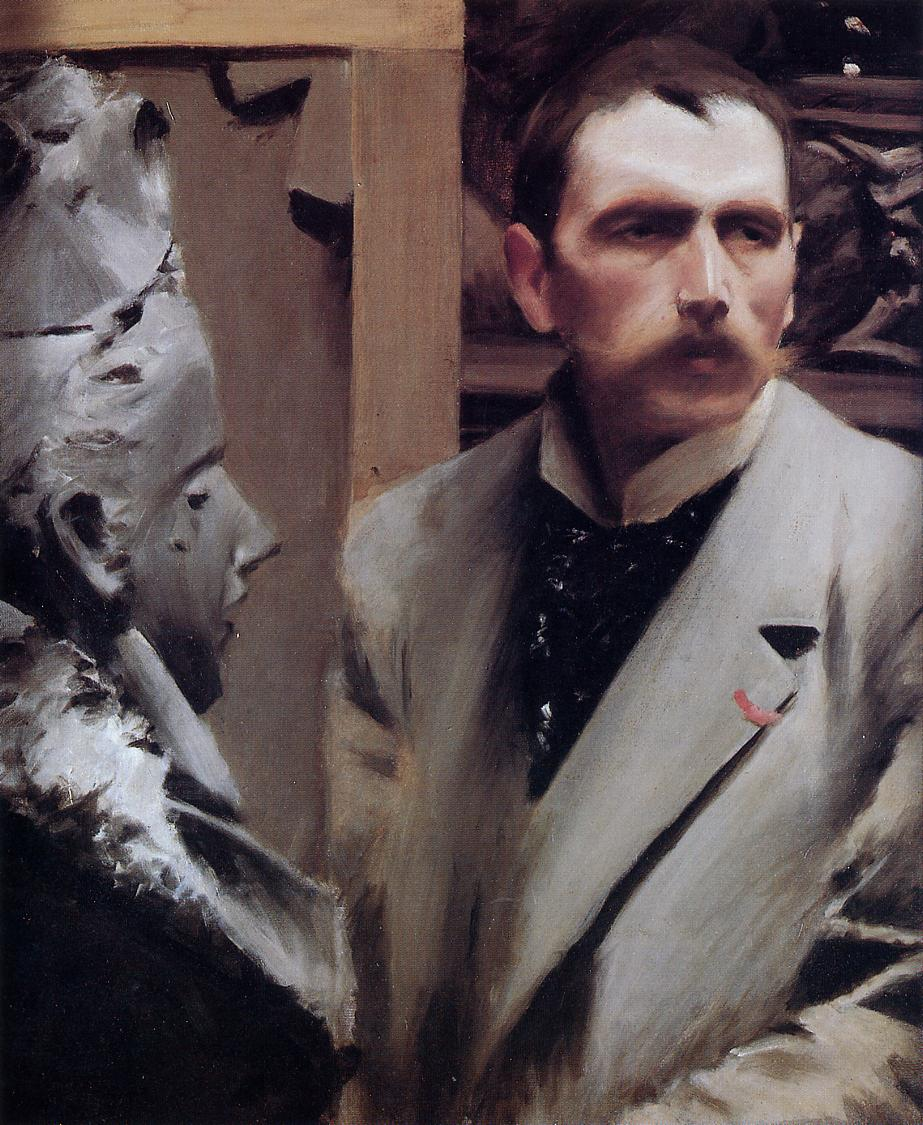
Self portrait, undated

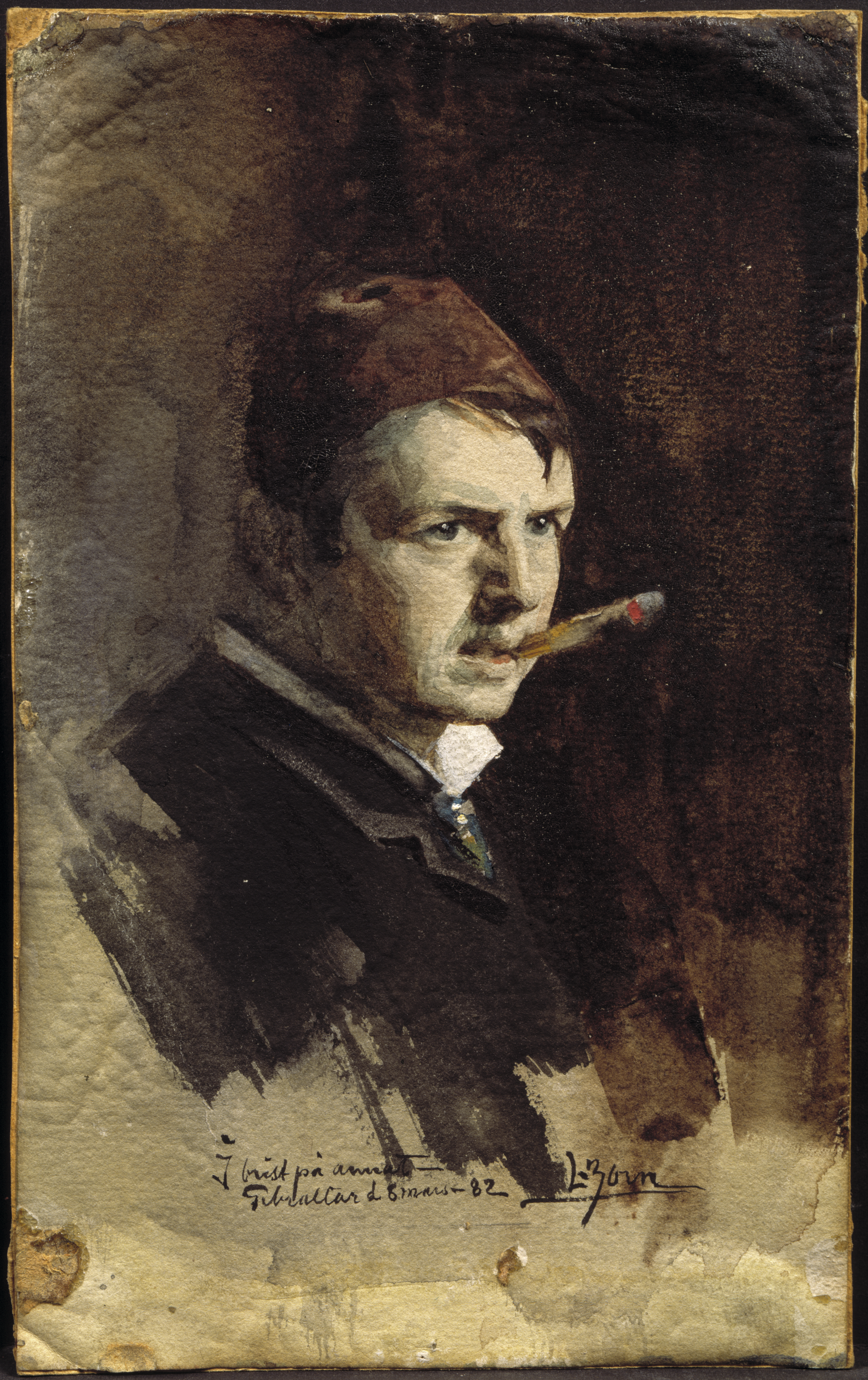
Self portrait, 1882

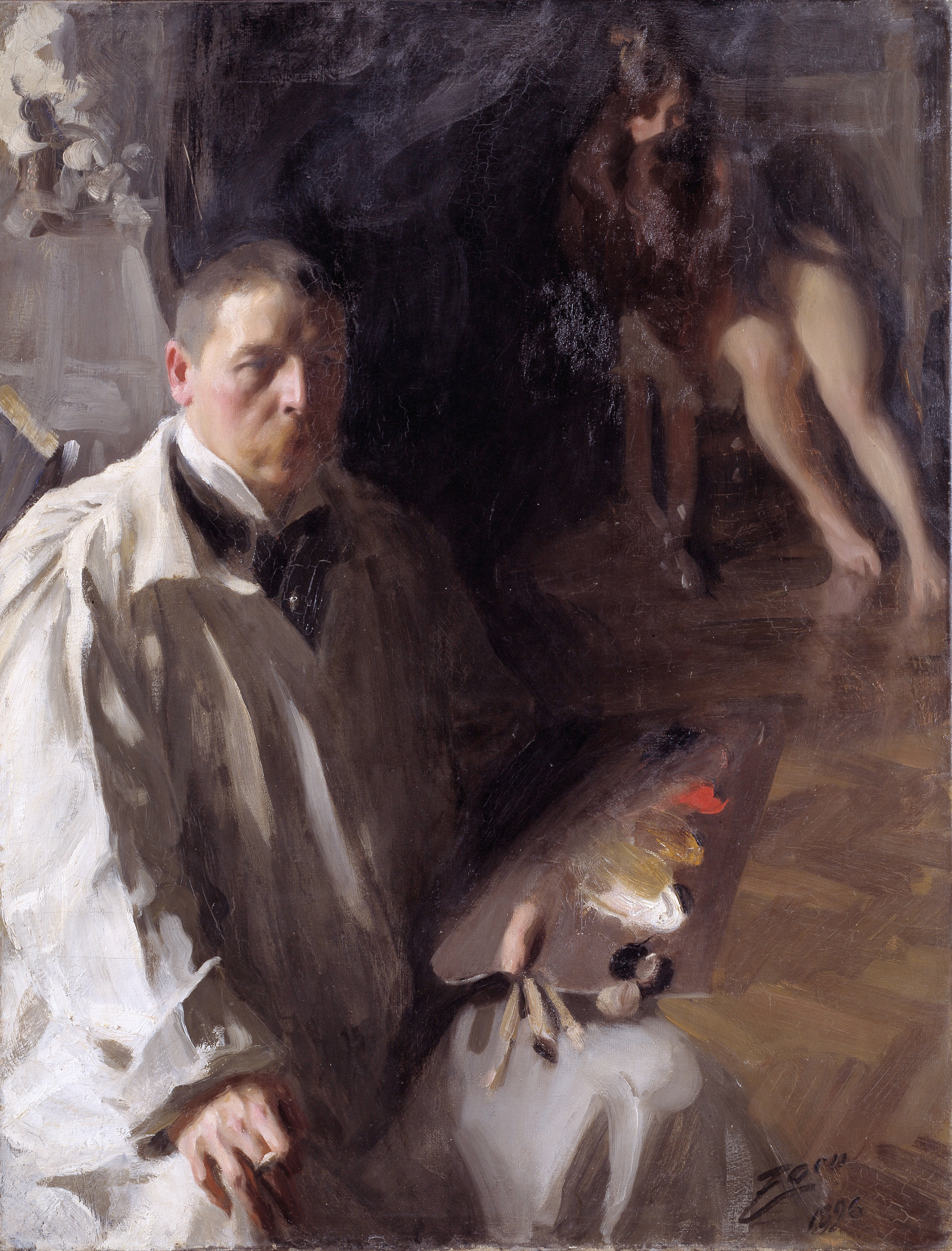
Self Portrait with Model, 1896

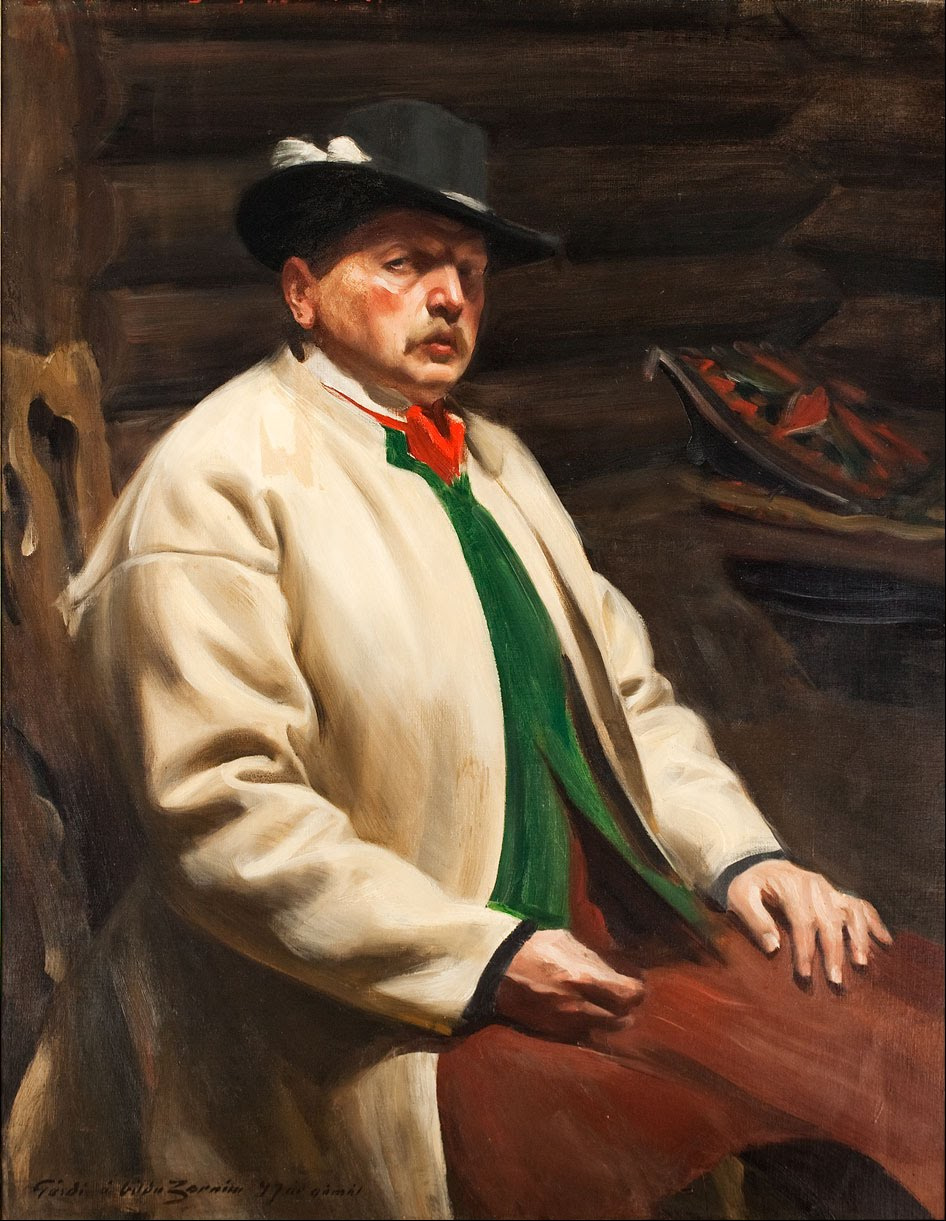
Self Portrait with Hat 1907

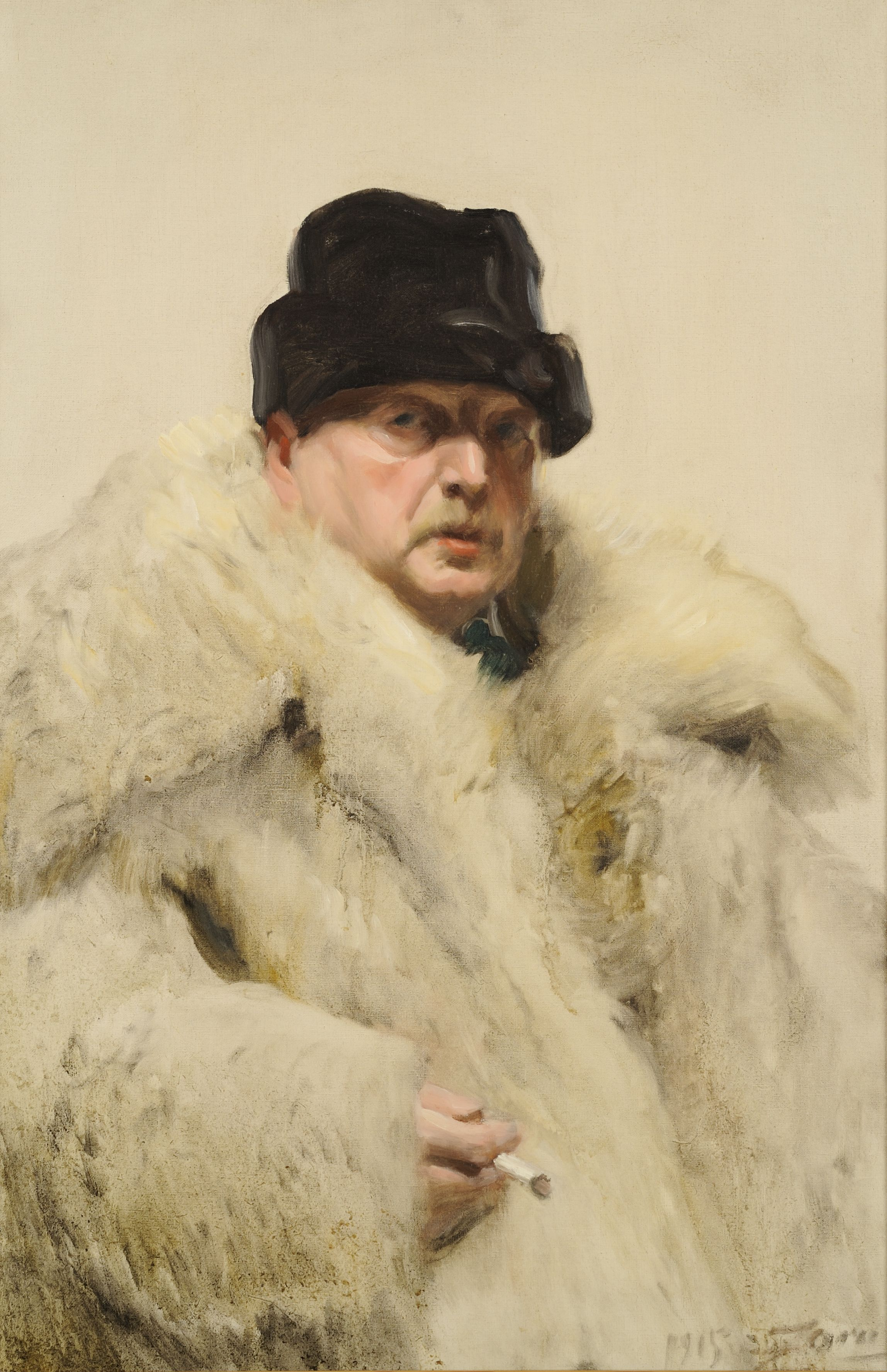
Self Portrait with Fur, 1915

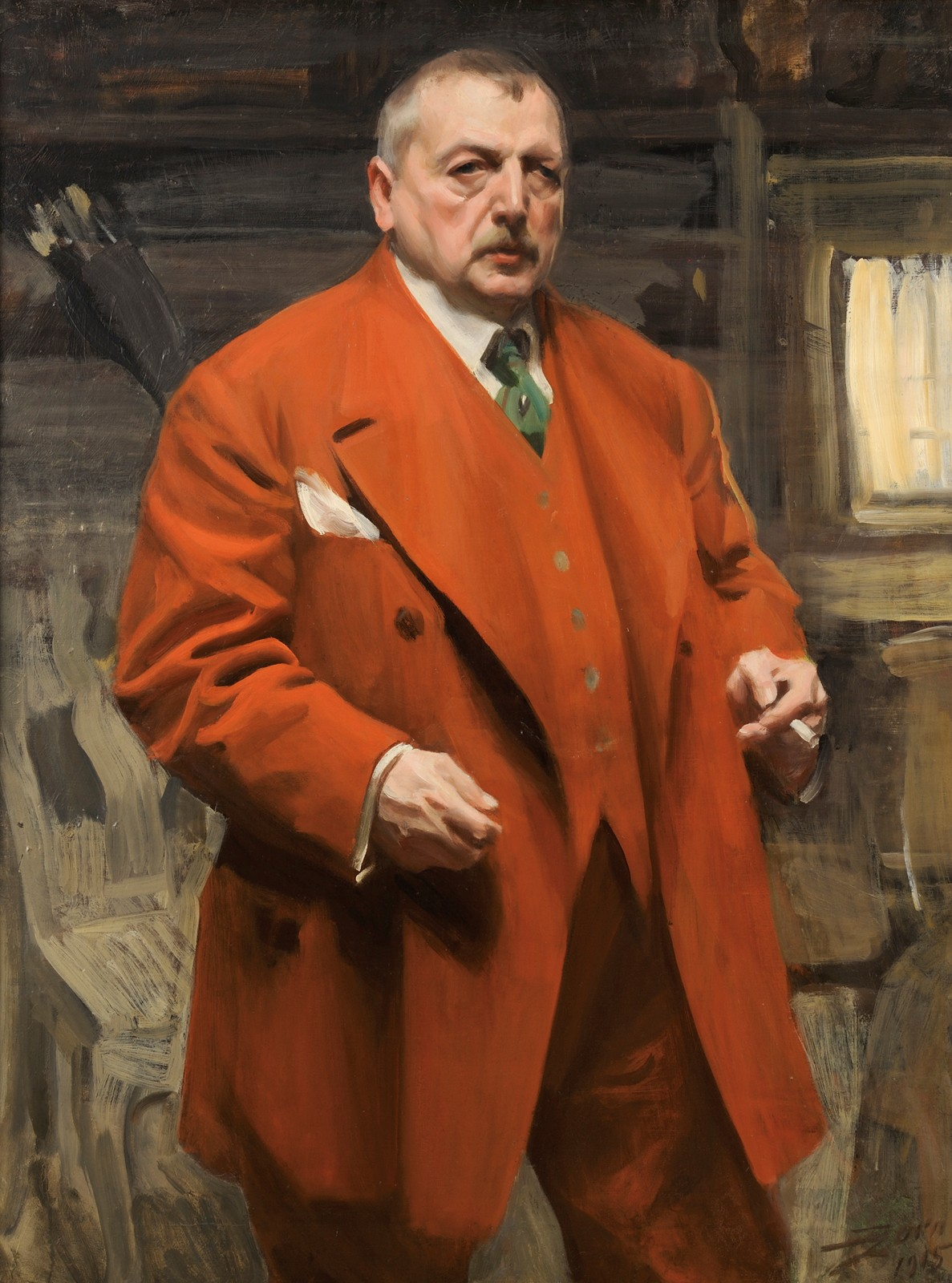
Self-portrait in red, 1915

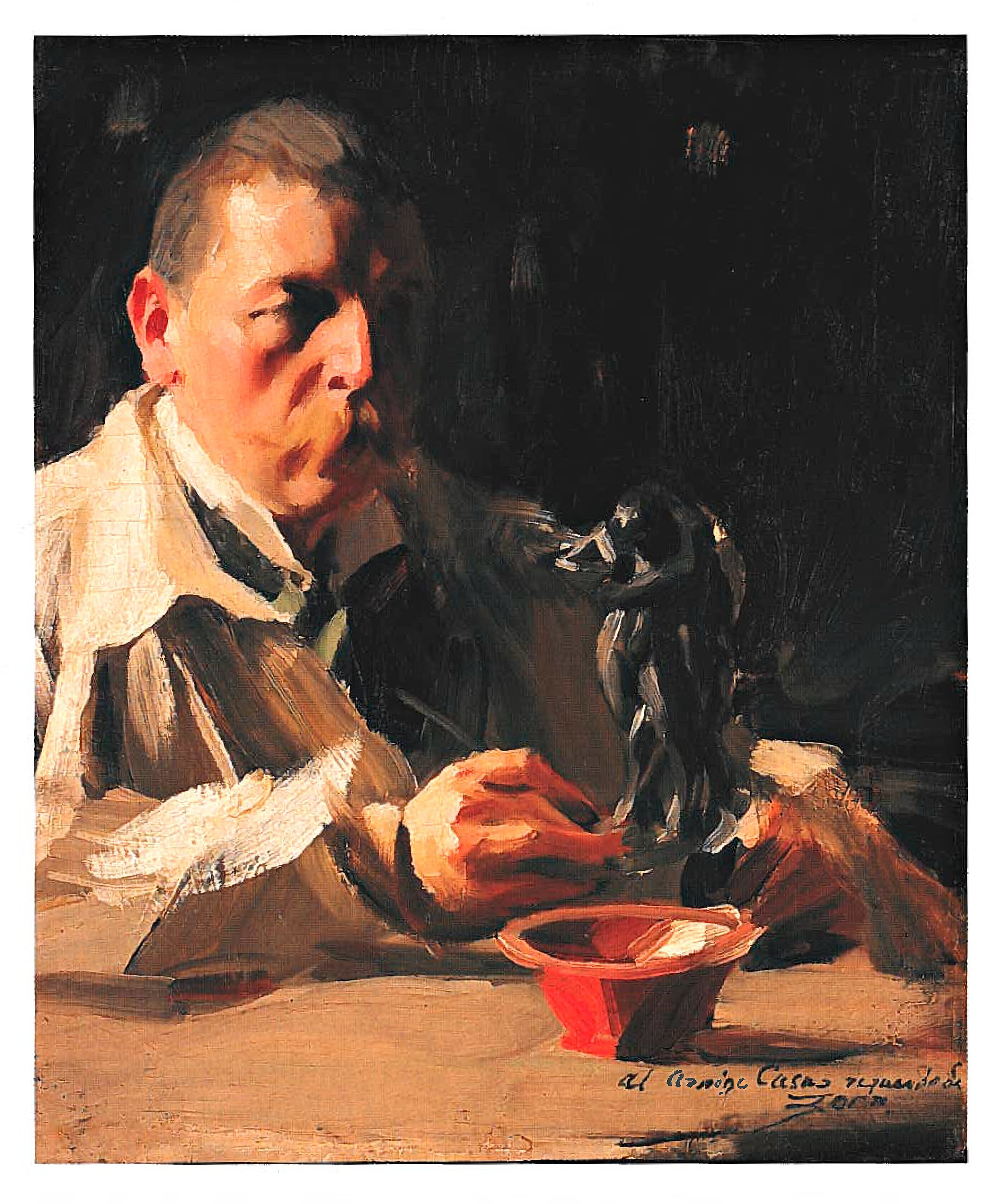
Self Portrait with Faun and Nymph (before 1920)

== Paintings ==
While his early works were often watercolors, by 1887 he had switched firmly to oils. Zorn was a prolific artist. He became an international success as one of the most acclaimed portrait painters of his era. His sitters included three American Presidents, nobility, the Swedish king and queen, and numerous members of high society. Zorn also painted portraits of family members, friends, and self-portraits. Zorn is also noted for his nude paintings. His fondness of painting full-figured women gave rise to the terms Zornkulla or dalkulla, an unmarried woman or girl from Dalarna, as the women were called in the local dialect of the region where Zorn lived.

Nudes

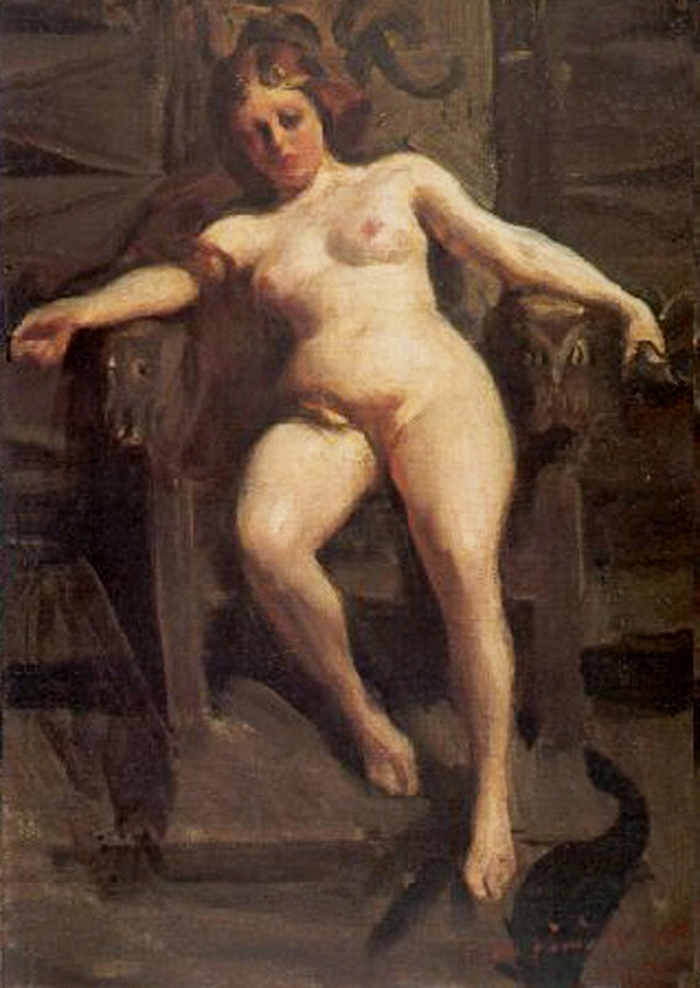
Freya, 1901

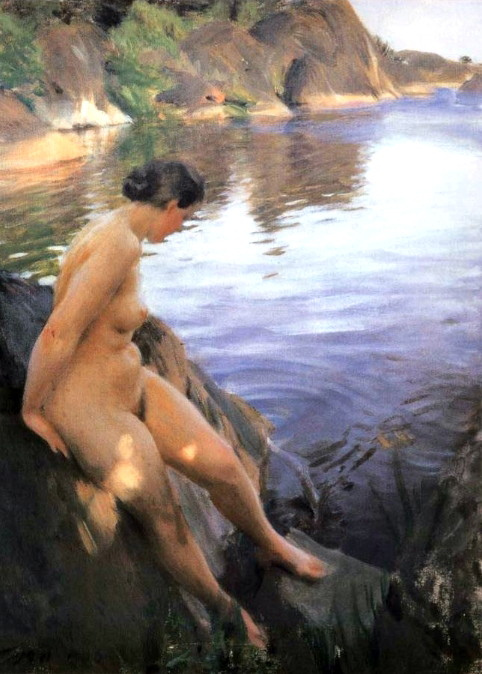
Woman bathing at Sandhamn, 1906

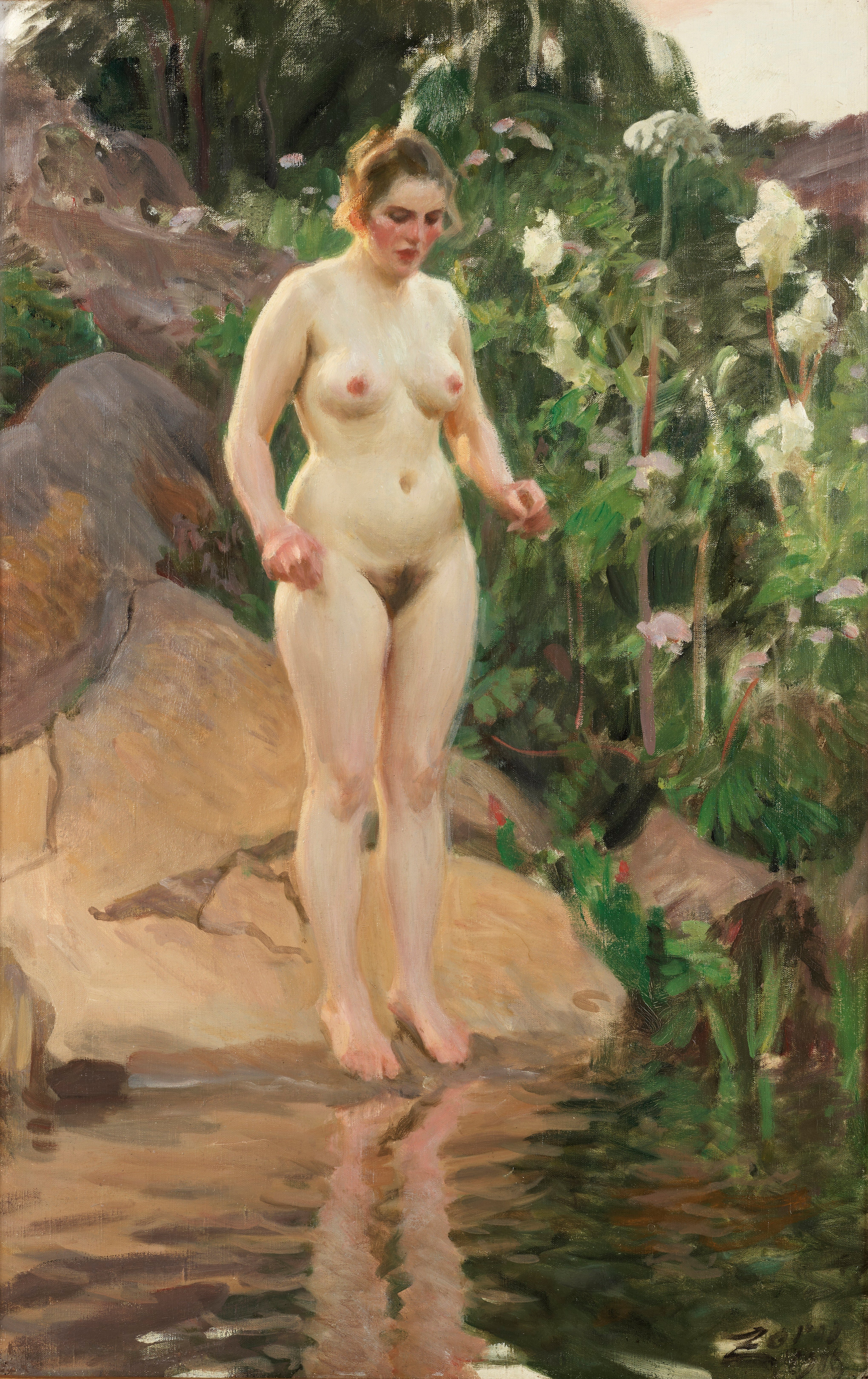
Skärgårdsblomster (Archipelago flower), 1916

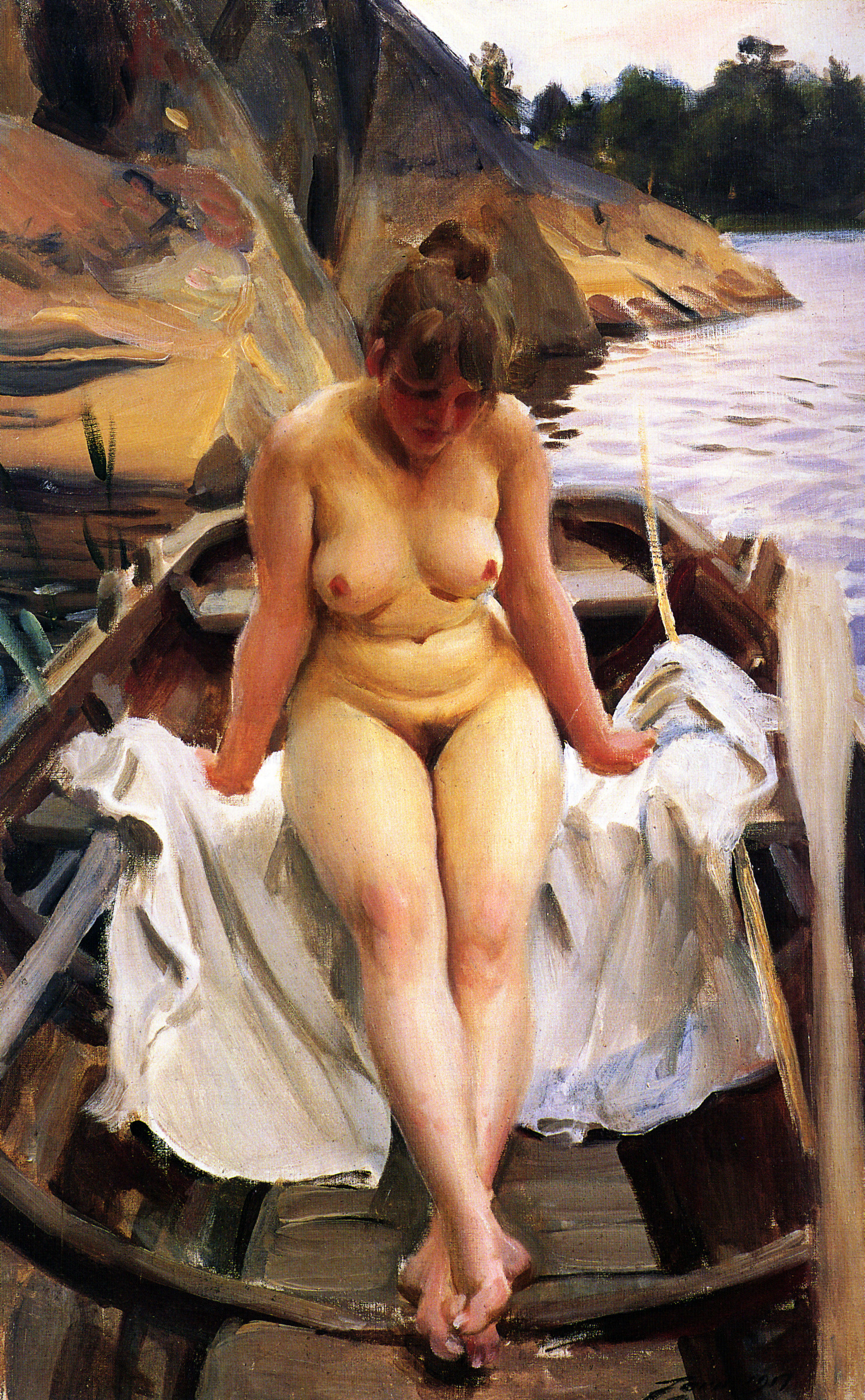
Woman in a boat, 1917

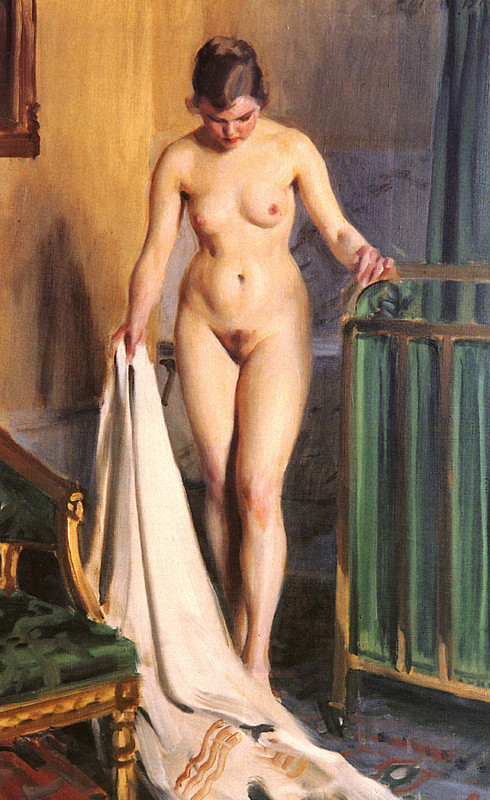
In the bedroom, 1918

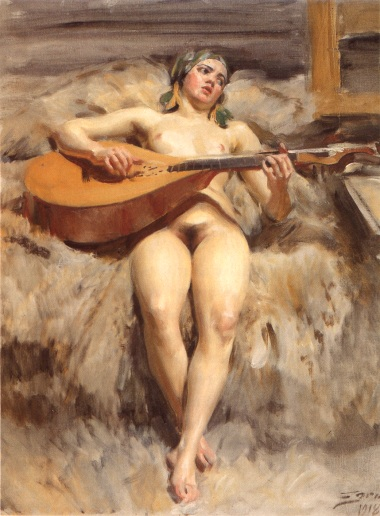
Studio Idyll, 1918

== Palette ==
Zorn was known to use a basic color palette consisting of lead white (flake white), yellow ochre, vermilion, and ivory black. This limited color palette shows tremendous range in terms of color mixing. A large variety of tonal ranges is possible using this palette, a very important development for portrait painting. The color palette can also be used in still life and landscape painting under certain circumstances. The most striking aspect is that an olive greenish color is possible to obtain by mixing ivory black with yellow ochre, as ivory black is bluish in nature.

== Other major works ==
- Martha Dana (later Mrs. William Mercer) (1899) Museum of Fine Arts, Boston
- George Peabody Gardner (1899) Museum of Fine Arts, Boston
- A Portrait of the Daughters of Ramón Subercaseaux (1892), Private collection
- Traveling companion (Mr. Charles Deering) (1904) Museum of Fine Arts, Boston

== Works ==
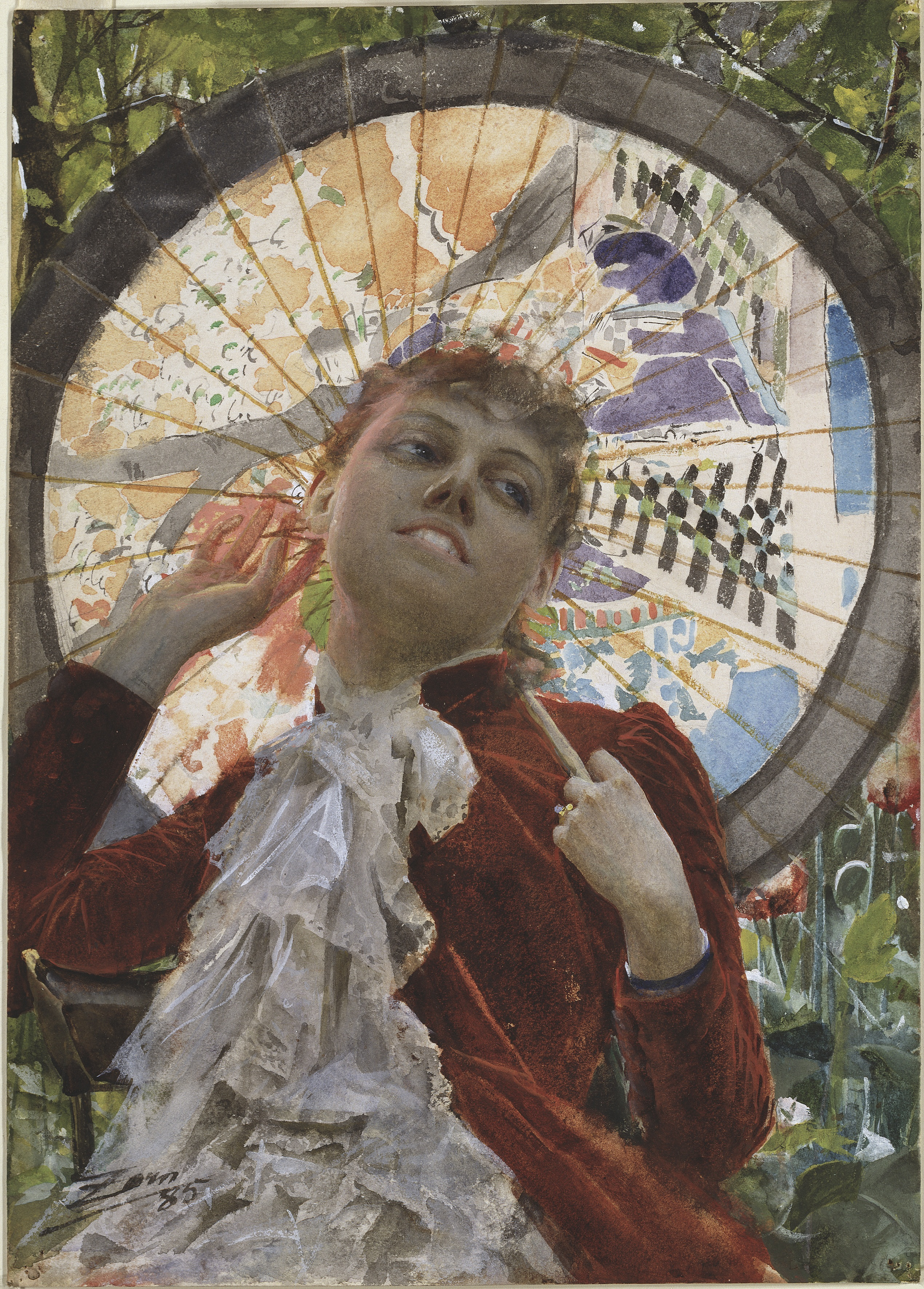
Castles in the Air, 1885

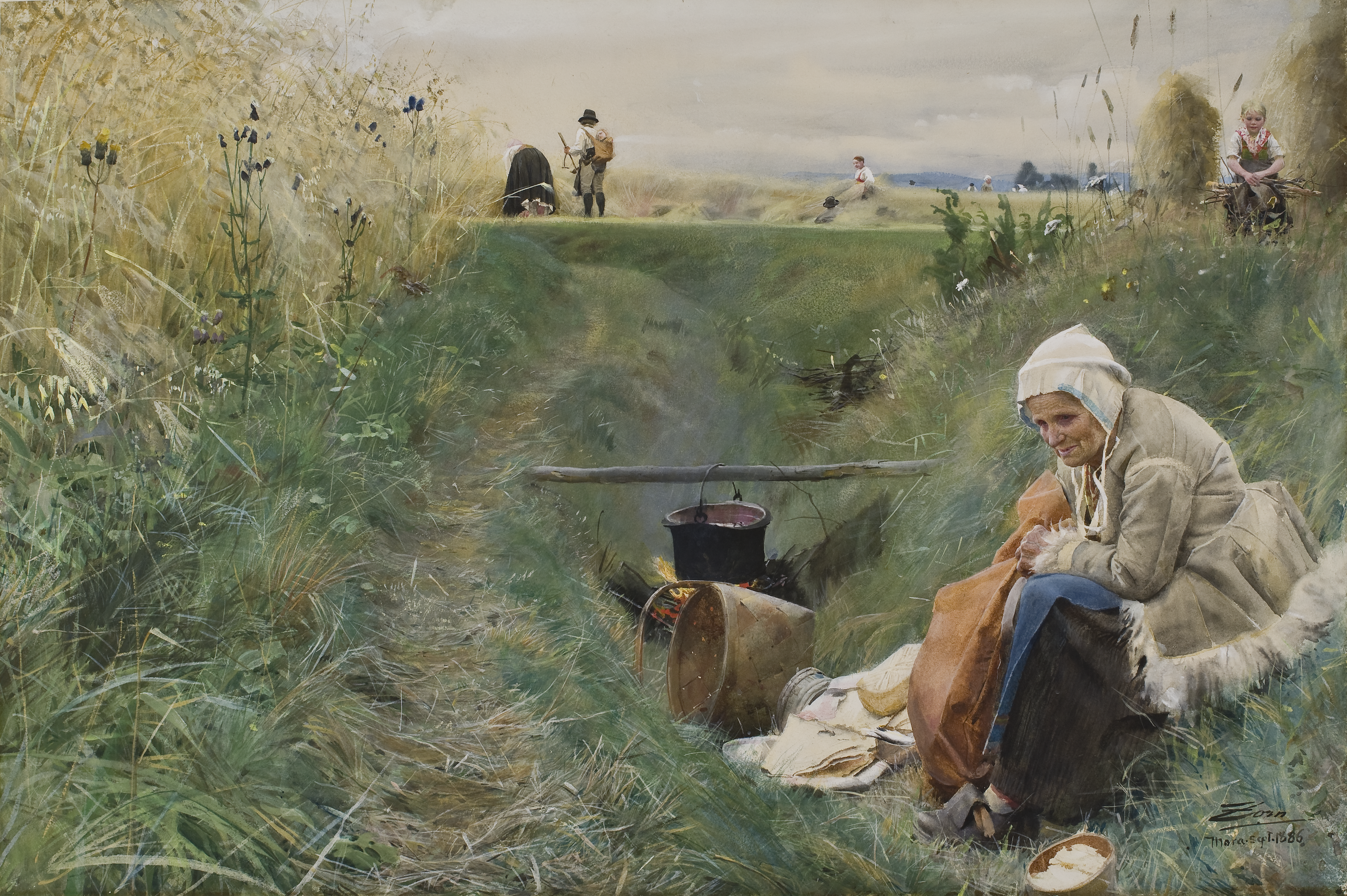
Our Daily Bread, 1886, Nationalmuseum, Stockholm

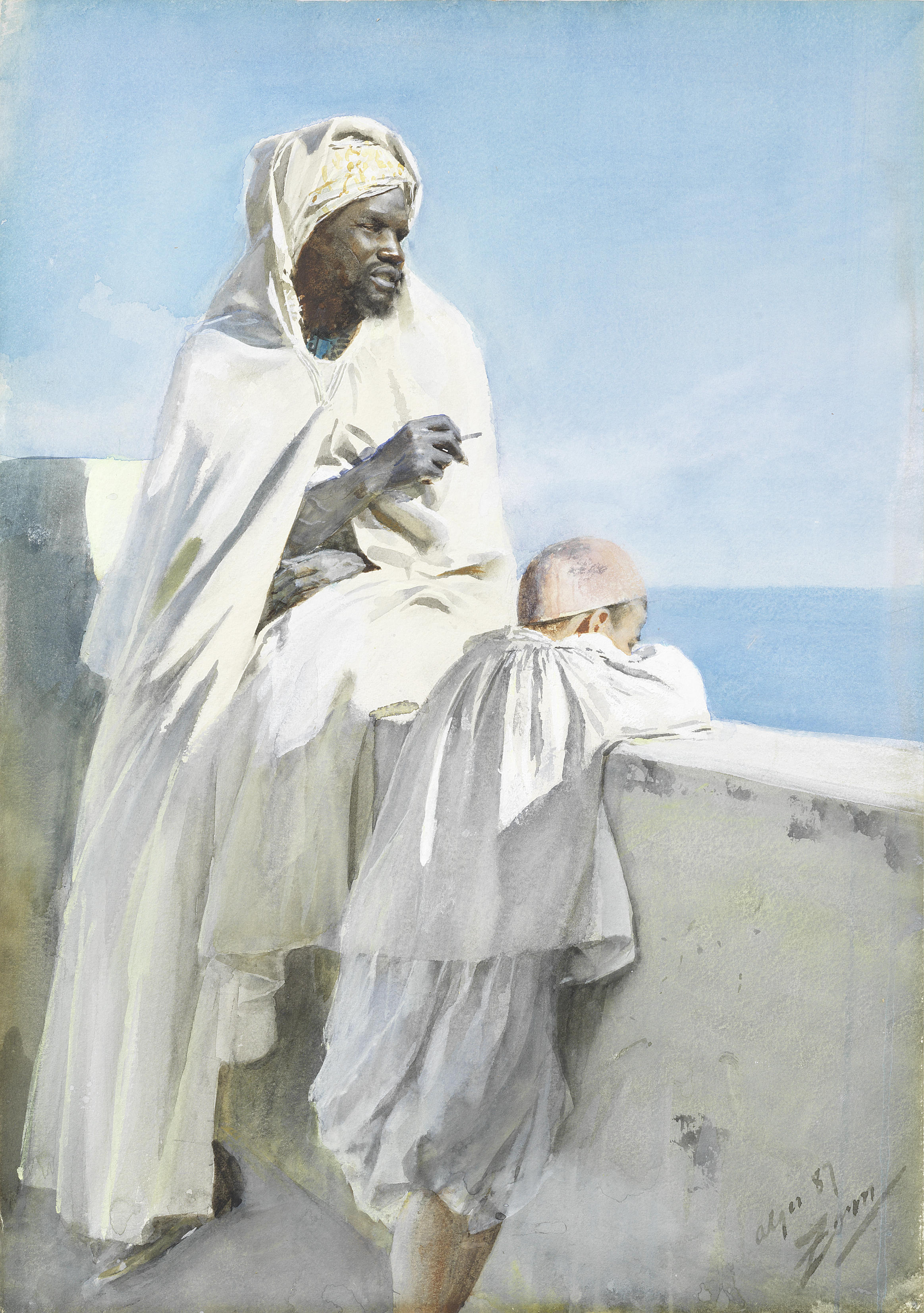
Man and boy in Algiers, 1887

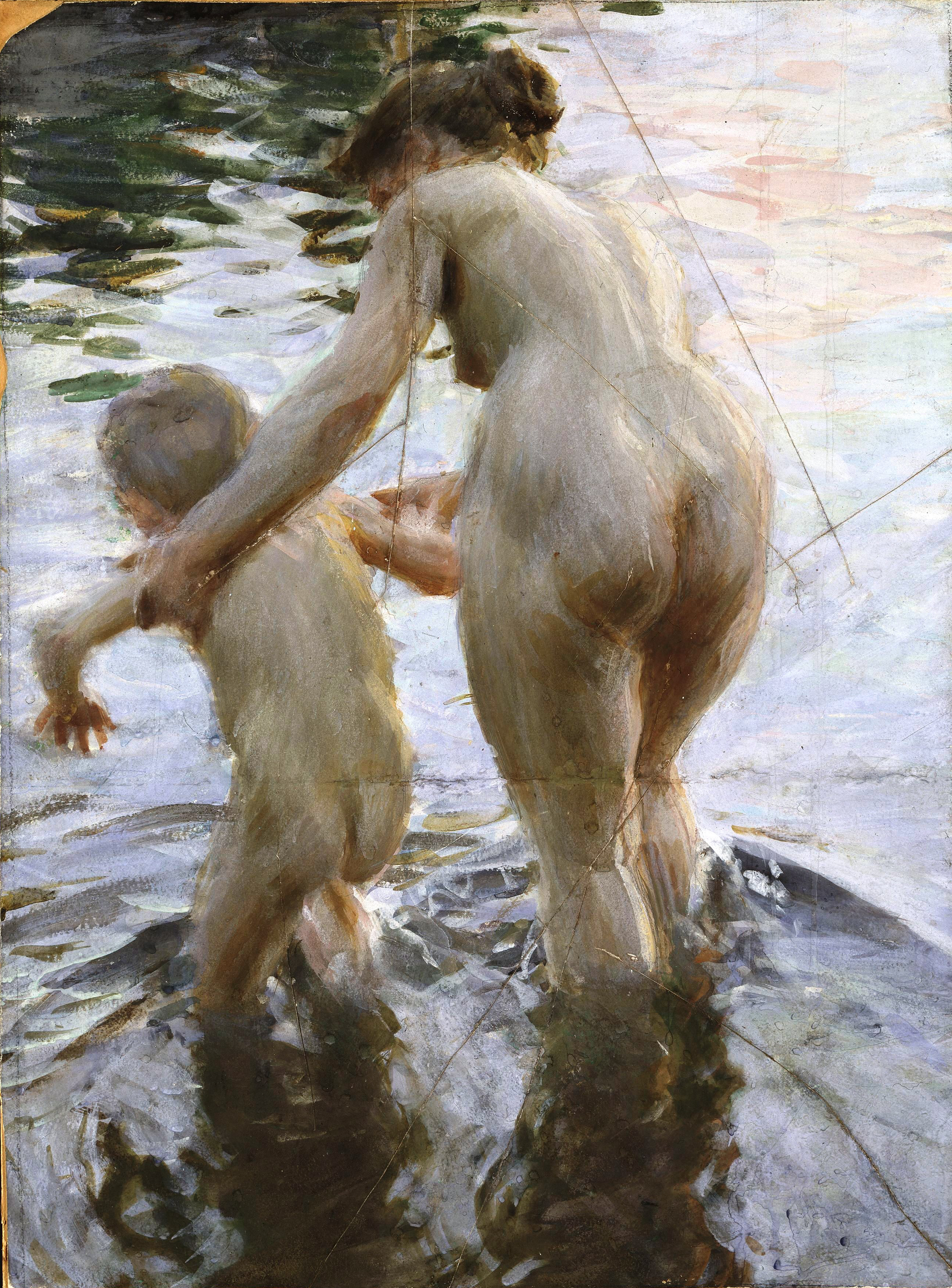
En premiär, 1888

Outdoors, 1888

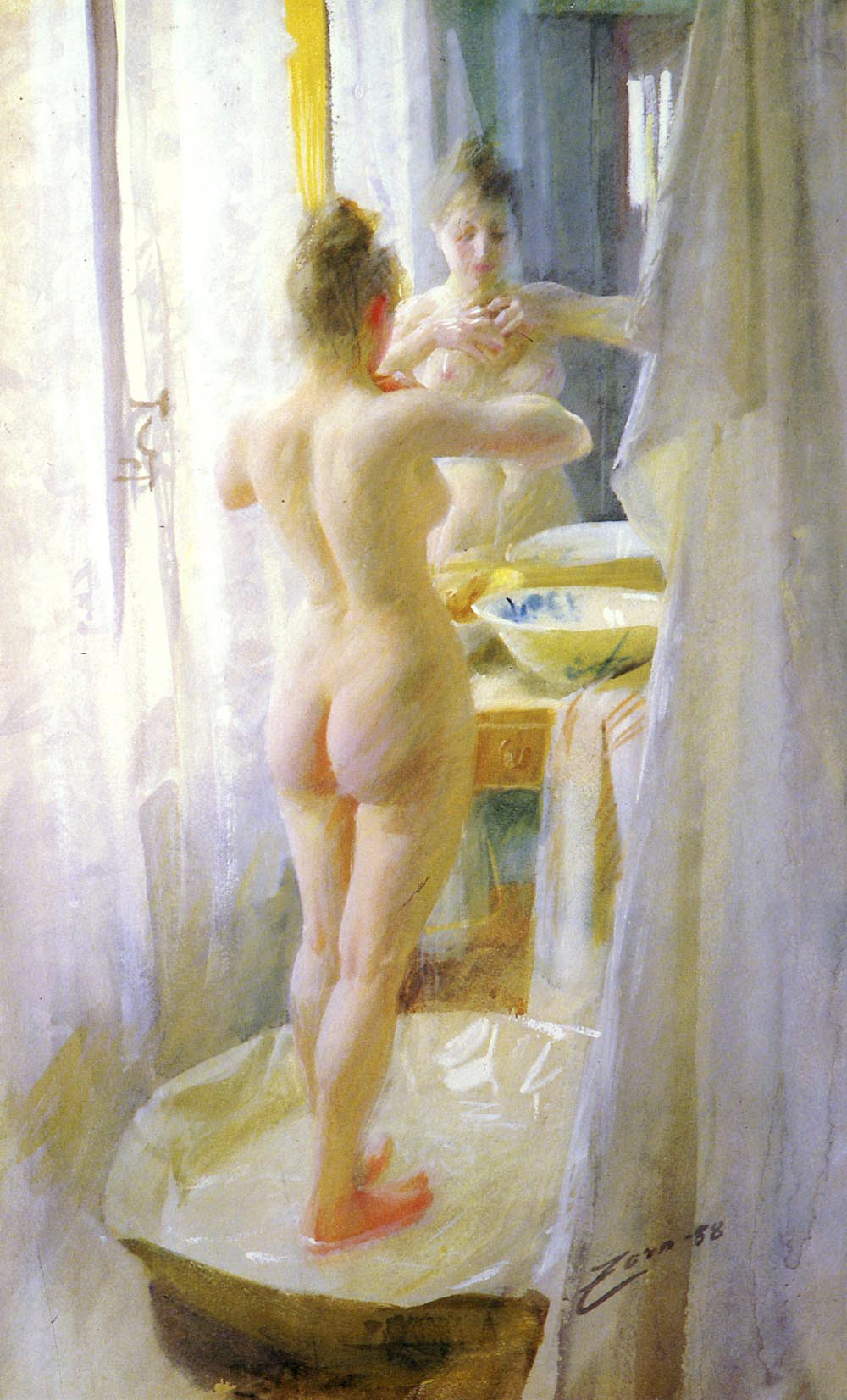
The Tub (1888)

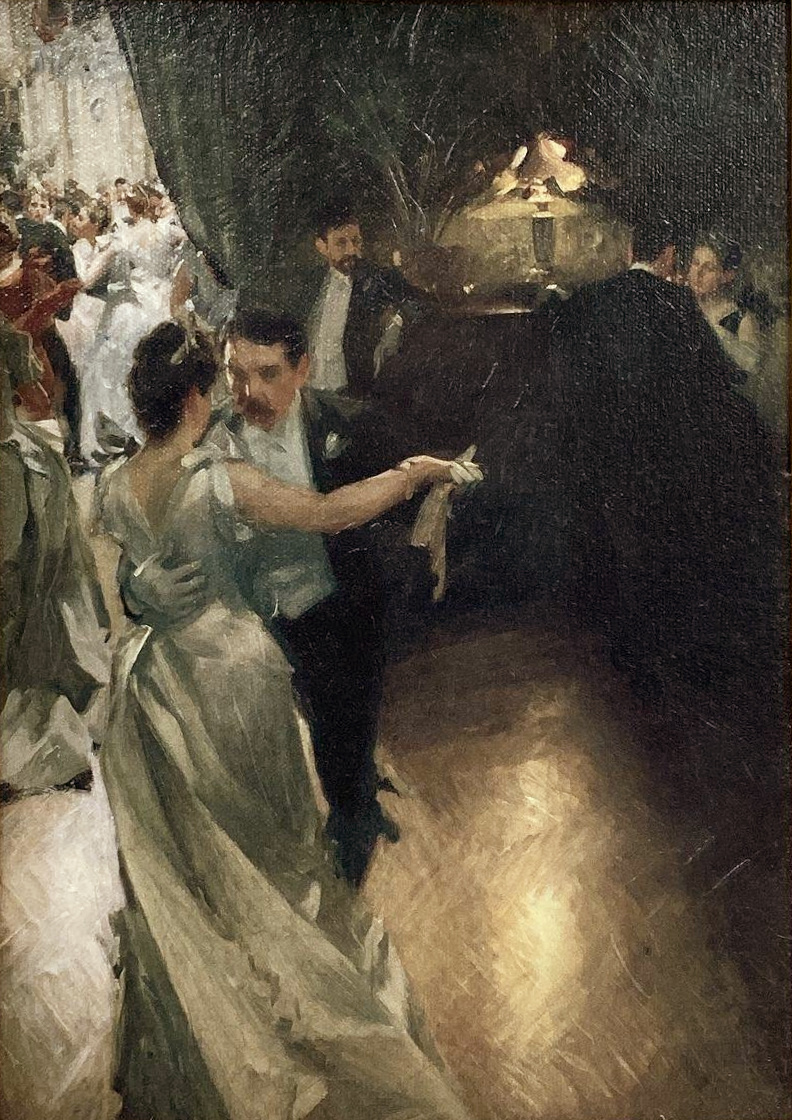
Waltz, 1891

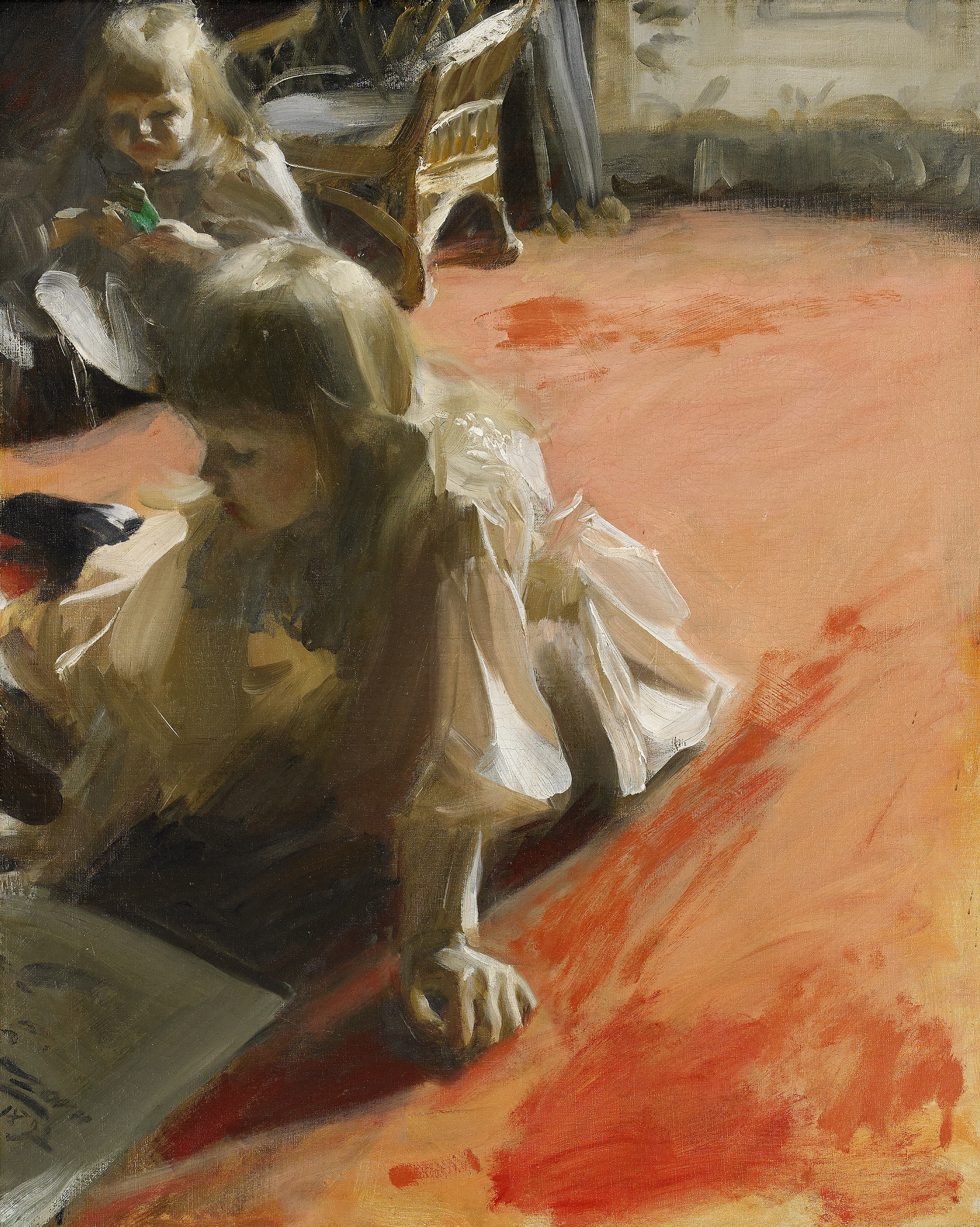
A Portrait of the Daughters of Ramón Subercaseaux, 1892

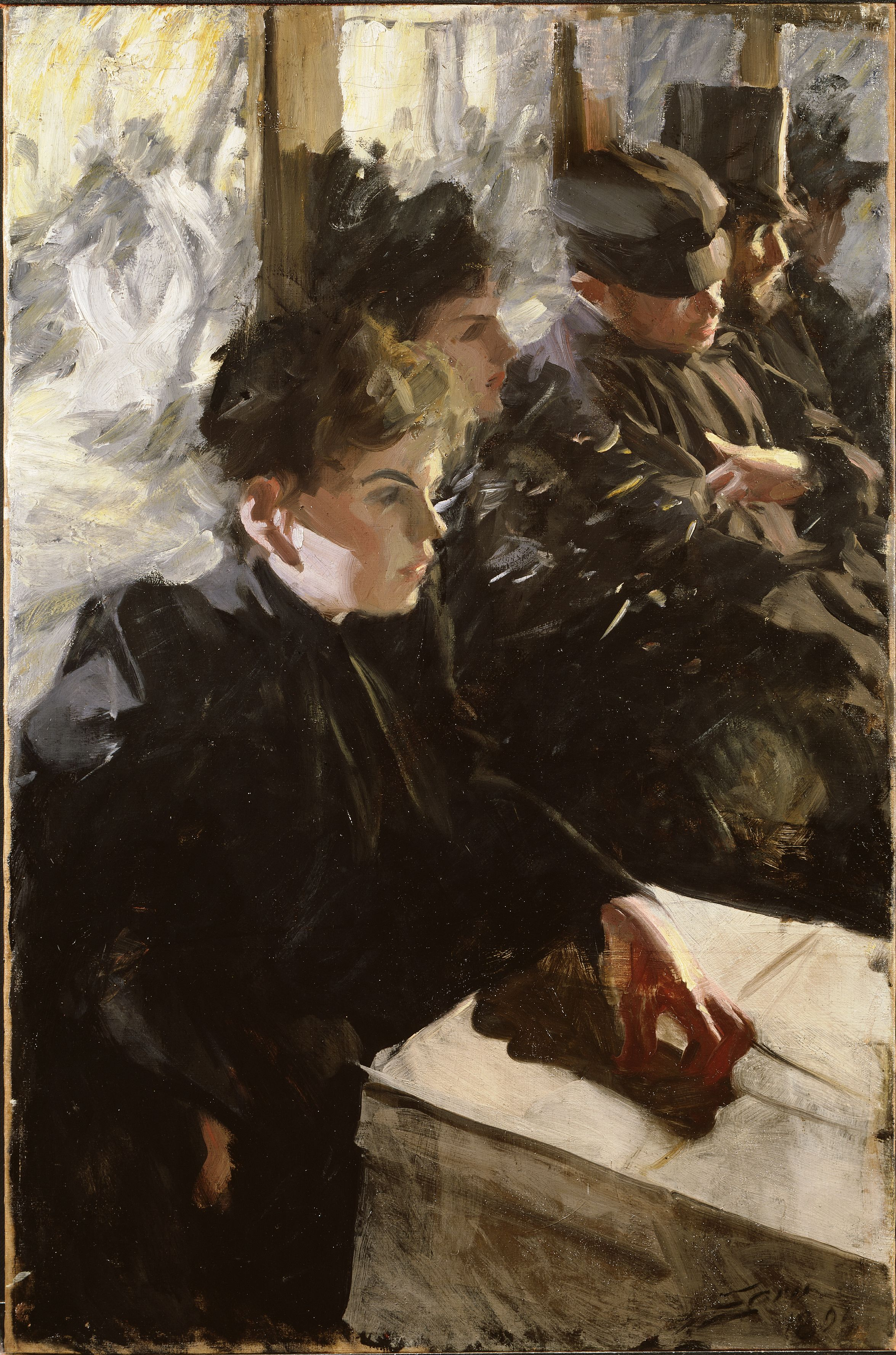
Omnibus I, 1892

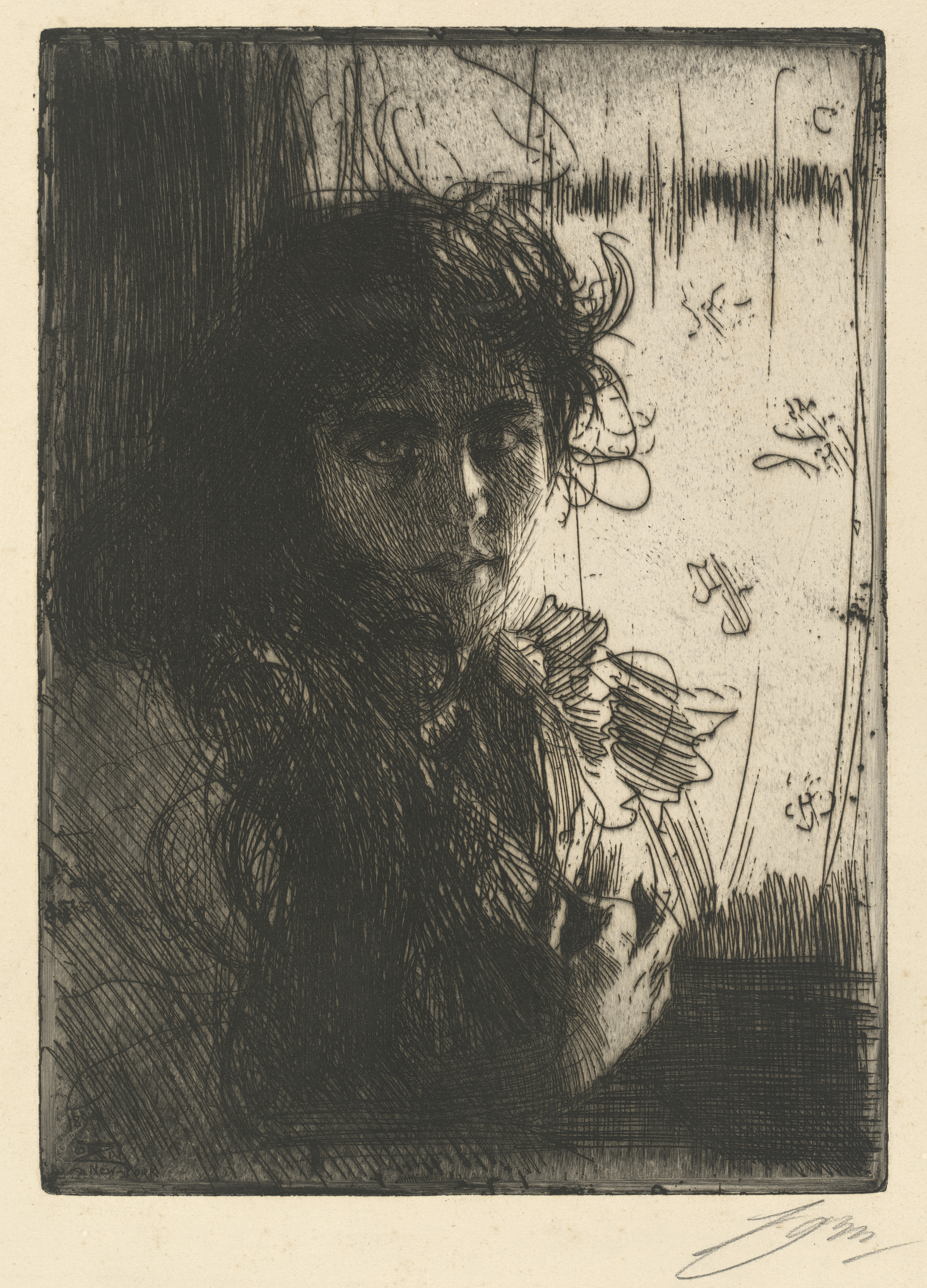
An Irish Girl, 1894, National Gallery of Art

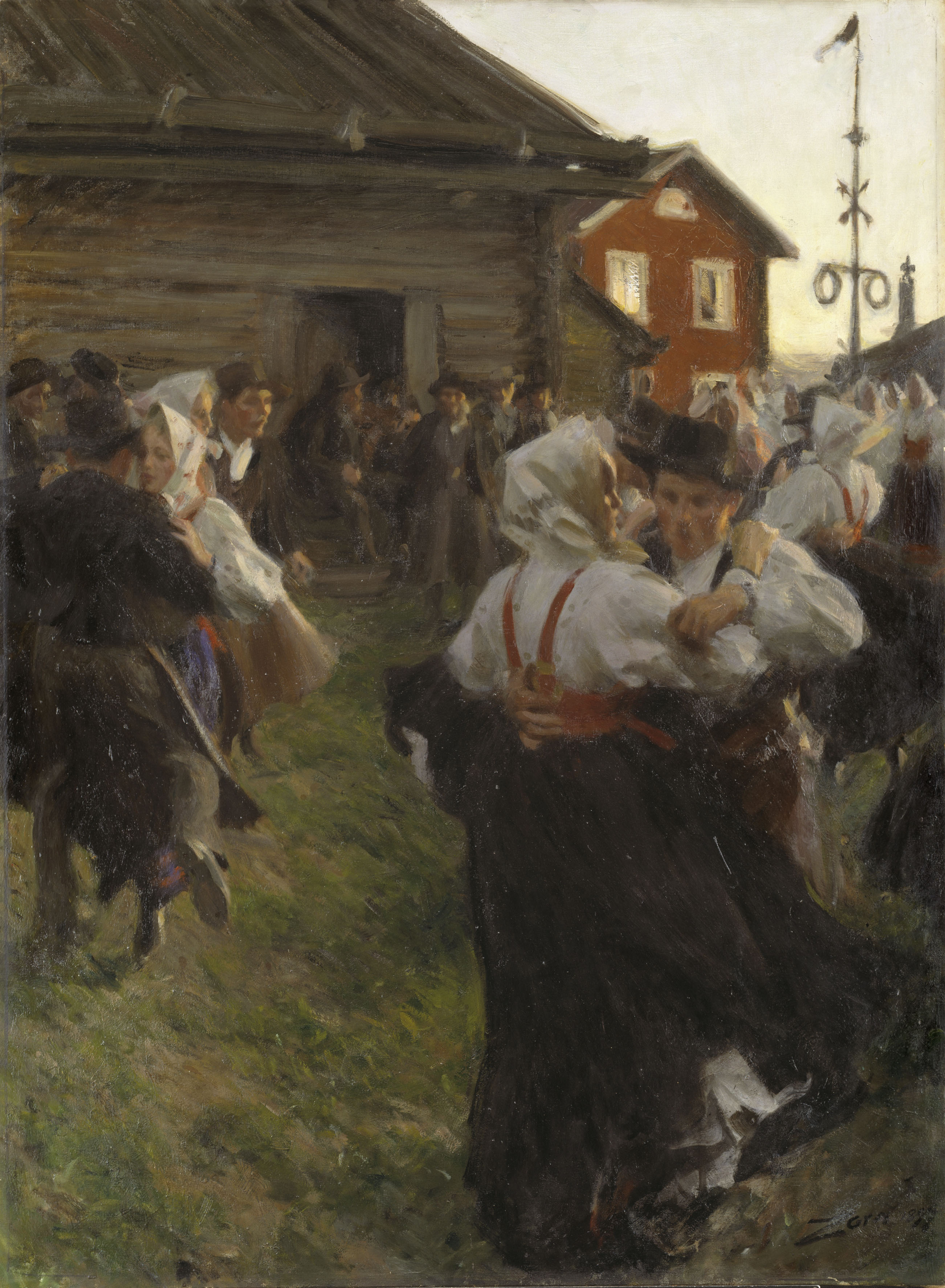
Midsummer Dance, 1897

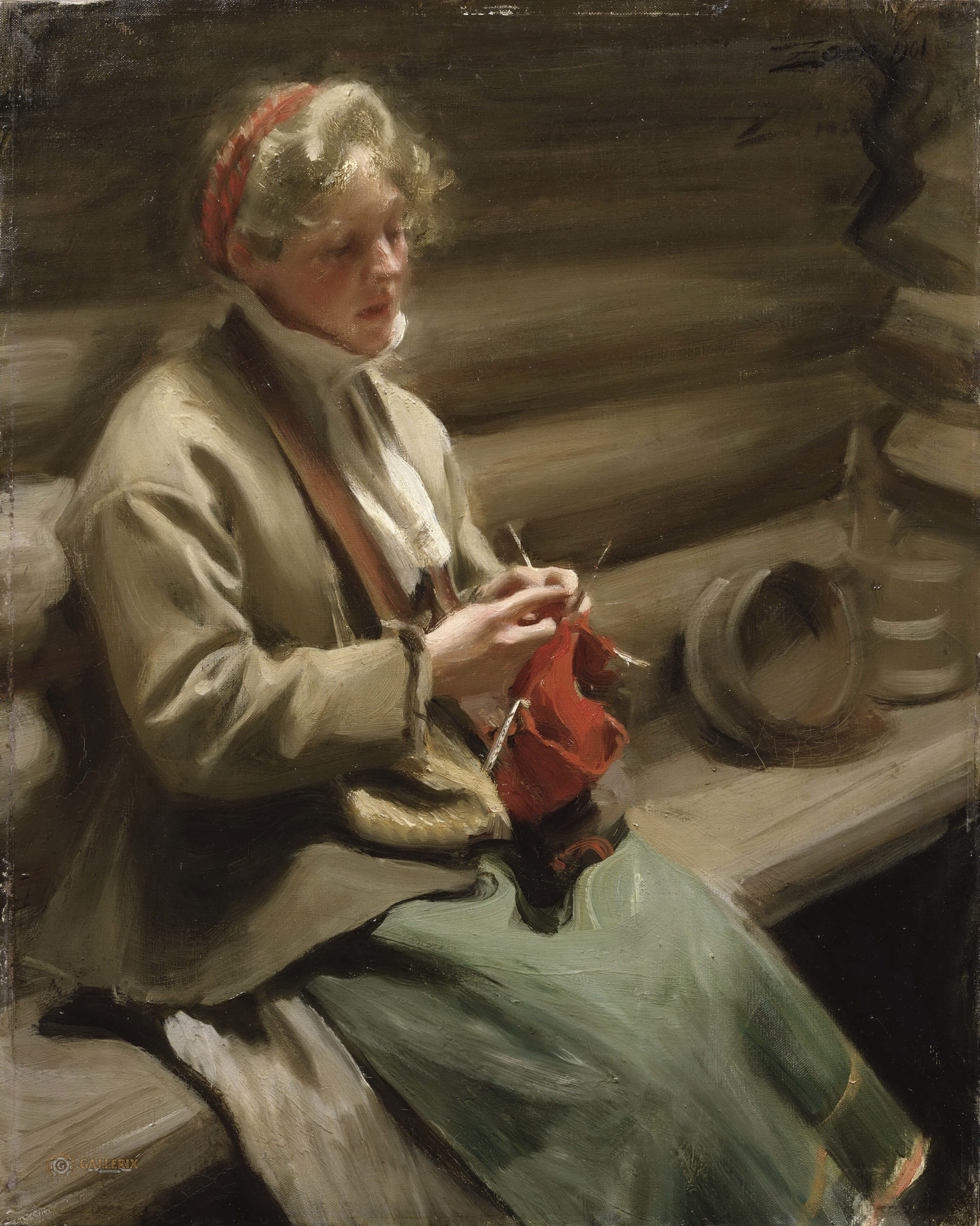
Dalecarlian Girl Knitting. Cabbage Margit, 1901

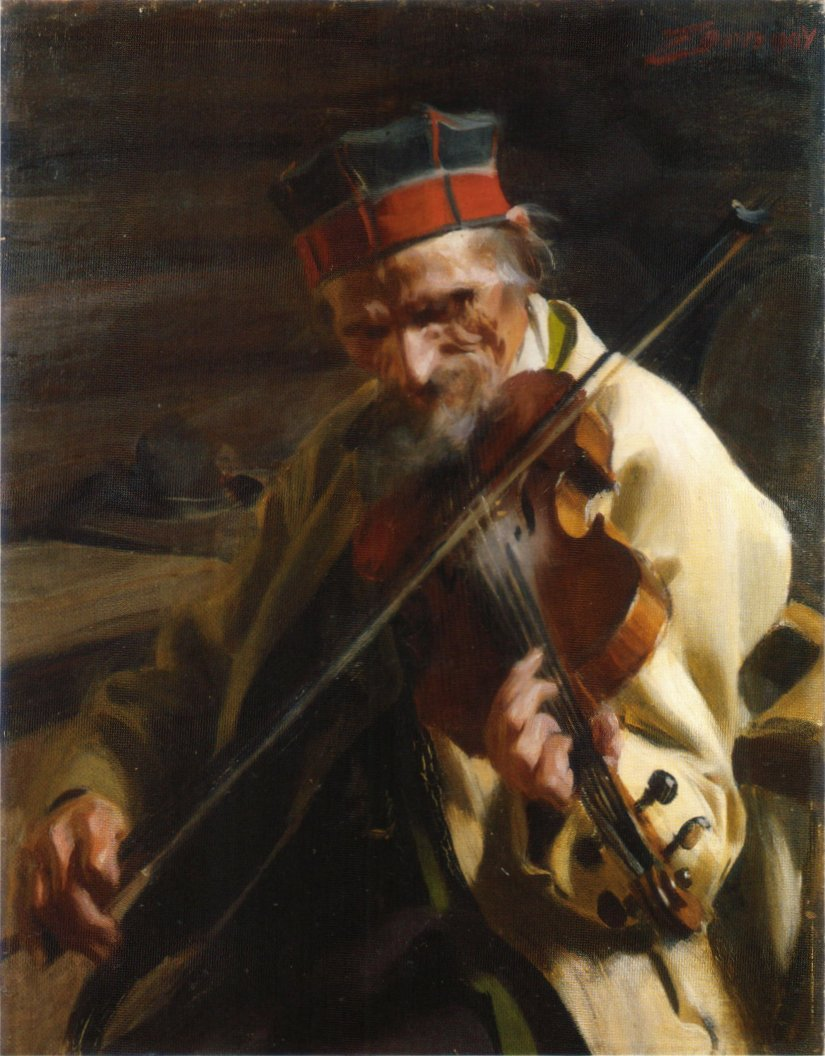
Hins Anders, fiddler or spelman, 1904 (Thiel Gallery)

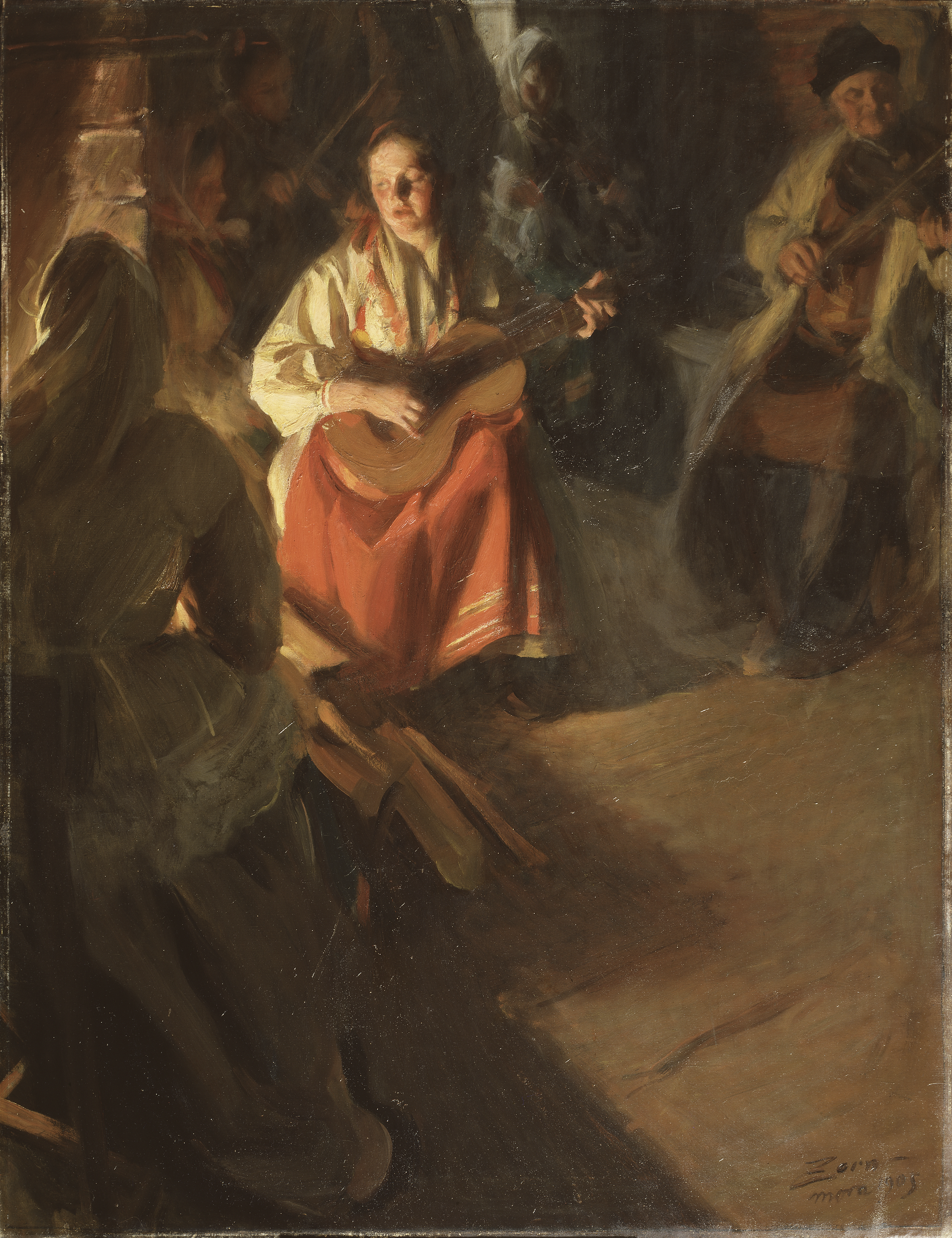
A Musical Family, 1905

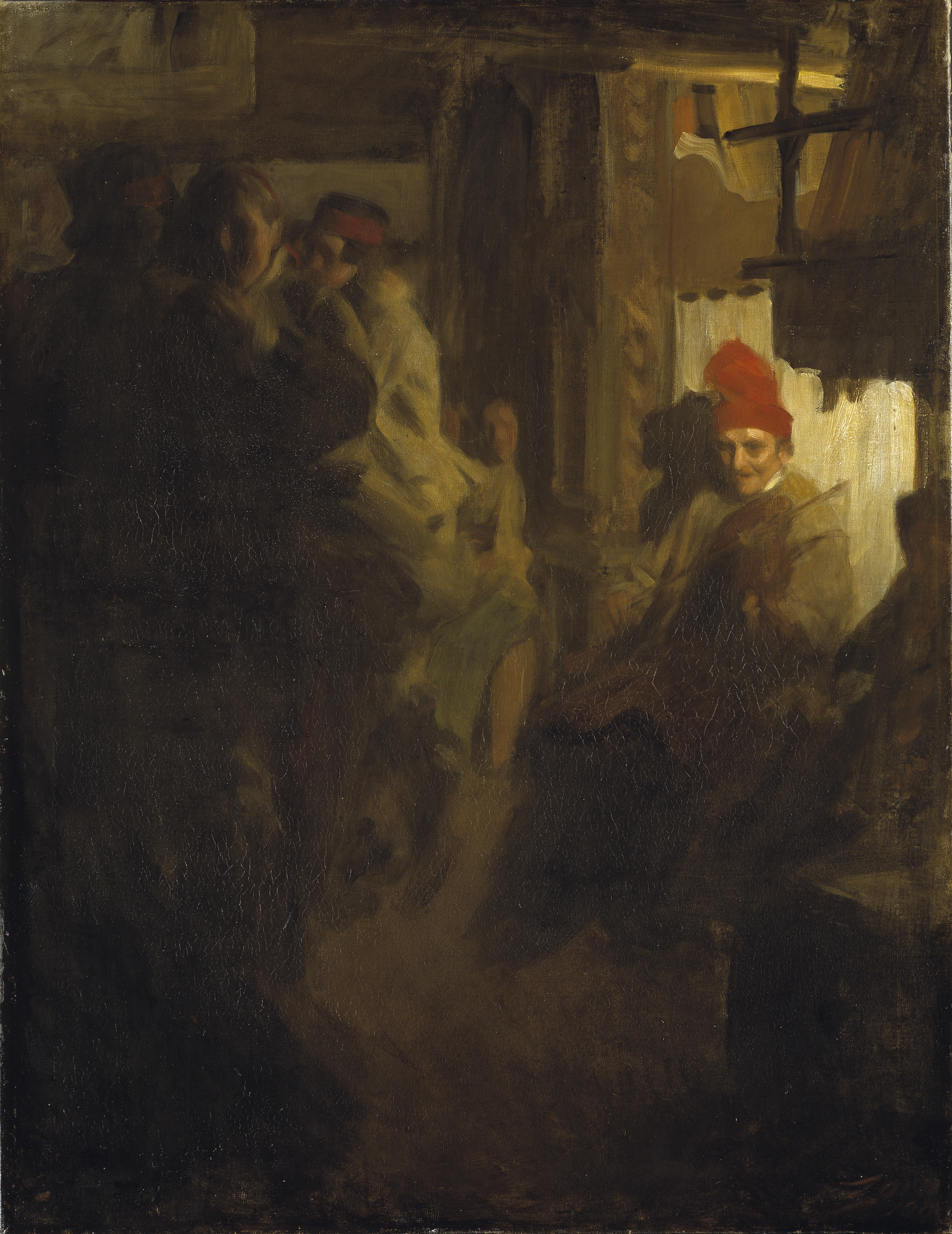
Dance in Gopsmor, 1906

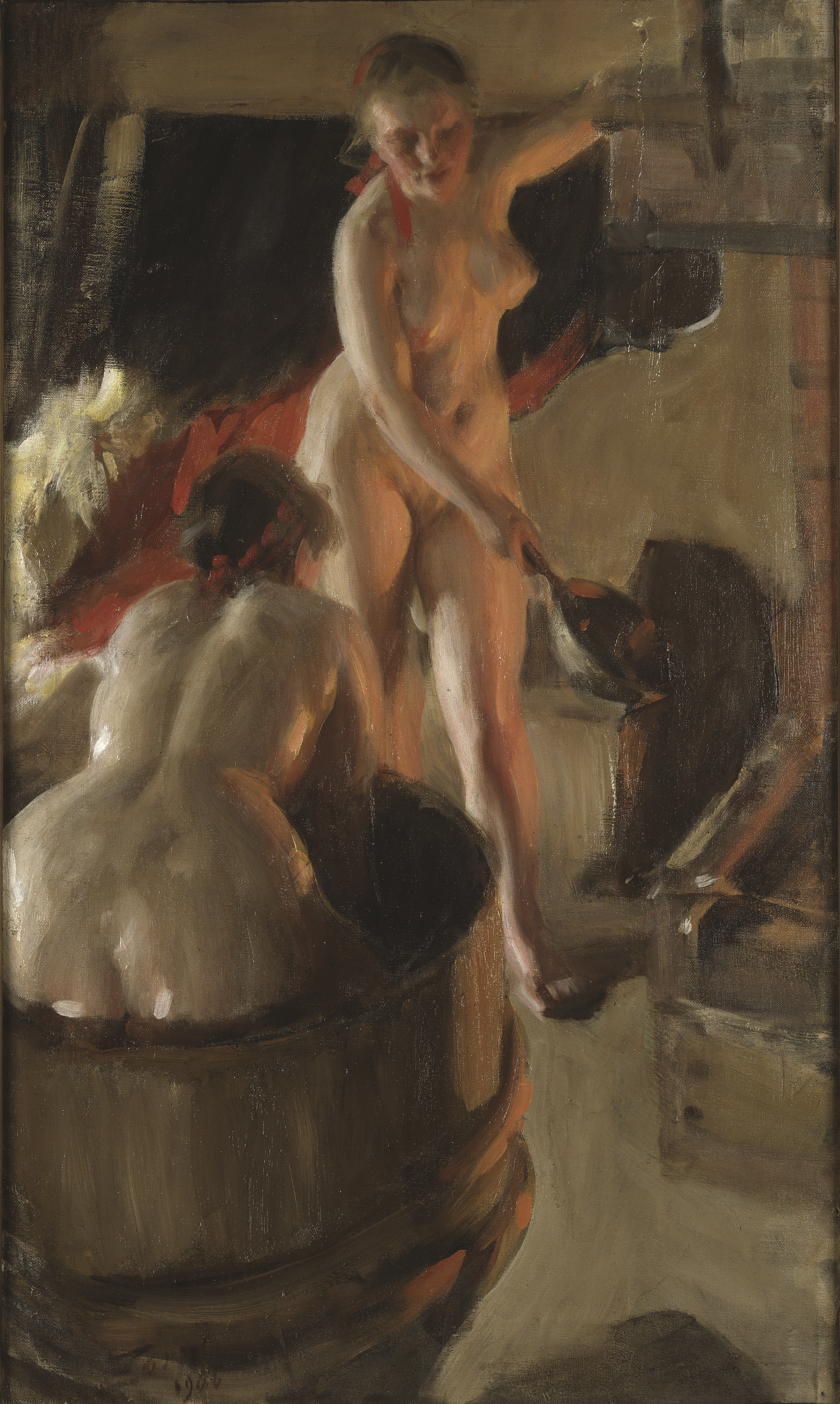
Girls from Dalarna Having a Bath, 1906

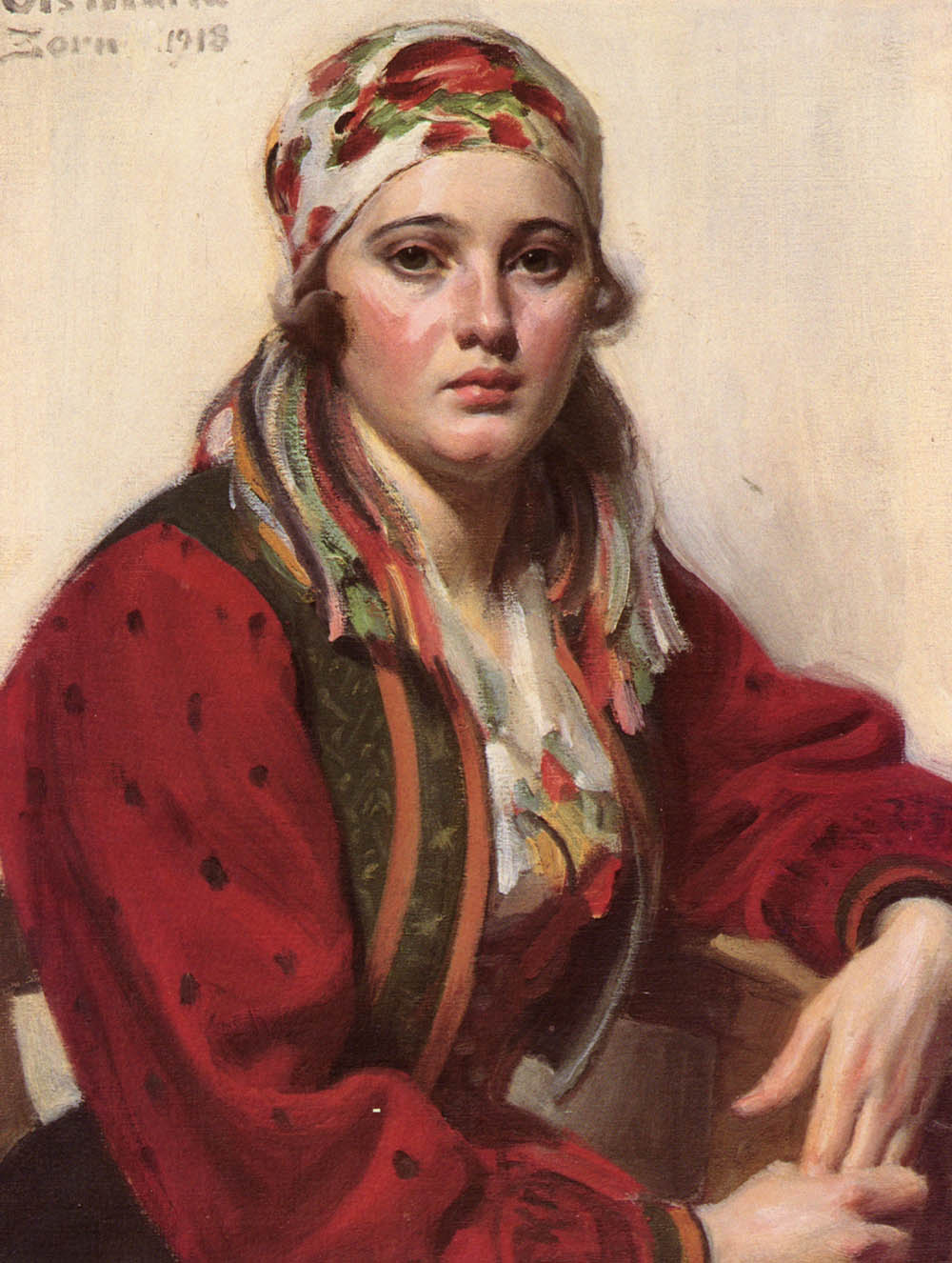
Ols Maria, 1918

== See also ==
- Bruno Liljefors
- Zorn Collections

== Other sources ==
- Birnbaum, Britta (1985). Paintings at Nationalmuseum. (Stockholm: Nationalmuseum) ISBN 91-7100-273-1
- Lidbeck, Sven (2007). Anders Zorn Etchings – Catalogue Raisonné 2007. (Stockholm: Zorn Gallery) ISBN 978-91-631-8962-3
- "Anders Zorn in the Gilded Age", PBS biography (Colorado Public Television), one hour, 2013.
- Oliver Tostmann, ed., Anders Zorn: A European Artist Seduces America (Boston: The Isabella Stewart Gardner Museum, 2013)
- ArtGraphica biography
