= List of people from Santiago =

This is a list of notable people who were born, lived or are/were famously associated with Santiago, Chile.

== A ==
- Joe Abrigo (born 1995), footballer player.
- Miguel Aceval (born 1983), footballer player.
- Gerson Acevedo (born 1988), footballer player.
- Claudia Acuña (born 1971), jazz vocalist, songwriter, and arranger.
- Tomás Ahumada (born 2001), footballer player.
- Williams Alarcón (born 2000), footballer player.
- Melissa Aldana (born 1988), tenor saxophone player.
- Carlos Aldunate Lyon (1916–2018), Catholic Jesuit priest, teacher, writer, and promoter.
- Jorge Alessandri (1896–1986), President of Chile.
- Isabel Allende (born 1945), politician.
- Salvador Allende (1908–1973), President of Chile.
- Juan Allende-Blin (born 1928), composer and academic teacher.
- Pedro Humberto Allende (1885–1959), composer.
- Clodomiro Almeyda (1923–1997), politician.
- Judith Alpi (1893–1983), painter and teacher.
- Carlos Altamirano (1922–2019), lawyer and socialist politician.
- Soledad Alvear (born 1950), lawyer and former Christian Democrat politician.
- Alejandro Amenábar (born 1972), film director, screenwriter and composer.
- René Amengual Astaburuaga (1911–1954), composer, educator and pianist.
- Luis Araneda (born 1953), footballer.
- Graciela Aranis (1908–1996), painter and cartoonist.
- Manuel Araya Díaz (1948–1994), footballer.
- Pedro Araya Toro (born 1942), footballer player.
- Baruch Arensburg (born 1934), physical anthropologist.
- Fernando Astengo (born 1960), footballer and current manager.
- Fernanda Astete (born 1997), tennis player.
- Isaías Azerman (1912–1983), footballer player.

== B ==
- Michelle Bachelet (born 1951), President of Chile.
- Manuel Baquedano (1823–1897), soldier and politician.
- Tomás Barrios Vera (born 1997), tennis player.
- Carmen Barros (1925–2023), actress and singer of jazz, popular music, and opera.
- Luis Barros Borgoño (1858–1943), politician.
- Ramón Barros Luco (1835–1919), politician.
- Juan Barros Madrid (born 1956), prelate of the Catholic Church.
- Rubén Bascuñán (born 1982), footballer player.
- Jaime Bassa (born 1977), politician and attorney.
- Luis Bates (1934–2023), lawyer and politician.
- Marco Bechis (born 1955), film screenwriter and director.
- Hugo Berly (1941–2009), footballer player.
- Vicente Bianchi (1920–2009), composer, pianist, conductor, and orchestra and choir director.
- Vladimir Bigorra (born 1954), footballer defender.
- Matías Bize (born 1979), film director, producer and screenwriter.
- José Miguel Blanco (1839–1897), sculptor, illustrator and writer.
- Nico Bodonczy (born 1955), footballer.
- Roberto Bolaño (1953–2003), novelist, short-story writer, poet and essayist.
- Cecilia Bolocco (born 1965), actress, TV host and beauty queen.
- Alberto Buccicardi (1914–1970), footballer player and manager.
- Pablo Burchard (1875–1964), painter.

== C ==
- Carlos Campos (1937–2020), footballer player.
- Marta Canales (1893–1986), violinist, choral conductor and composer.
- María Luz Cárdenas (born 1944), biochemist.
- Jorge Carrasco (born 1982), footballer player.
- Ignacio de la Carrera (1747–1819), aristocrat.
- Javiera Carrera (1781–1862), independence activist.
- José Miguel Carrera (1785–1821), general, formerly Spanish military, member of the prominent Carrera family, and considered one of the founders of independent Chile.
- Luis Carrera (1791–1818), military officer.
- María Elena Carrera (born 1929), physician and politician.
- Fernando Carvallo (born 1948), footballer player.
- Hernán Carvallo (1922–2011), footballer midfielder.
- Luis Hernán Carvallo (born 1949), footballer and manager.
- Sandrino Castec (born 1960), footballer player.
- Carlos Caszely (born 1950), footballer player.
- Roberto Cereceda (born 1984), footballer player.
- Arturo Chávez (born 1990), athlete specialising in the high jump.
- María Soledad Cisternas (born 1959), lawyer and disability rights activist.
- Jaime Collyer (born 1955) writer.
- Marcelo Corrales (born 1971), footballer player.
- Francisco José Cox (1933–2020), archbishop of the Catholic Church.
- Carlos Cubillos (1929–2003), footballer player.

== D ==
- Guillermo Deisler (1940–1995), stage designer, visual poet and mail artist.
- Jorge Délano Frederick (1895–1980), cartoonist, screenwriter, film director, and actor.
- Andrés Díaz (born 1964), cellist.
- Carlos Díaz (born 1993), middle-distance runner.
- César Díaz (born 1975), footballer player.
- Daniel Díaz (born 1948), footballer player.
- Fernando Díaz (born 1961), footballer manager and former player.
- Ítalo Díaz (born 1971), footballer and current manager.
- Marcelo Díaz (born 1986), footballer player.
- Marcelo Díaz (politician) (born 1971), politician.
- Marit Dopheide (born 1990), athlete.
- Miguel Droguett (born 1961), cyclist.

== E ==
- Rodrigo Echeverría (born 1995), footballer player.
- Mariano Egaña (1793–1846), lawyer, conservative politician and the main writer of the Chilean Constitution of 1833.
- Gustavo Ehlers (1925–2017), sprinter.
- Humberto Elgueta (1904–1976), footballer midfielder.
- Crescente Errázuriz (1839–1931), Dominican friar, Roman Catholic archbishop of Santiago, professor, writer and historian.
- Francisco Javier Correa Errázuriz (1879–1934), farmer and deputy.
- Francisco Javier Errázuriz Ossa (born 1933), prelate of the Catholic Church.
- Francisco Javier Errázuriz Talavera (1942–2024), businessman and a former senator and presidential candidate of the Progressive Union of the Centrist Center.
- Federico Errázuriz Echaurren (1850–1901), politician.
- Federico Errázuriz Zañartu (1825–1877), political figure.
- Fernando Errázuriz Aldunate (1777–1841), political figure.
- José Antonio Errázuriz (1747–1821), priest and political figure.
- José Tomás Errázuriz (1856–1927), landscape painter and diplomat.
- María Errázuriz (1861–1922), First Lady of Chile and the wife of President Germán Riesco Errázuriz.
- Maximiano Errázuriz (1832–1890), politician, industrialist and winemaker of Basque descent.
- Rafael Errázuriz Urmeneta (1861–1923), politician and diplomat.
- Agustín Eyzaguirre (1768–1837), political figure.

== F ==
- Daniel Farcas, Chilean deputy
- Rogelio Farías (1949–1995), footballer midfielder.
- Victor Farías (born 1940), historian.
- Elías Fernández Albano (c. 1845–1910), politician.
- Hernán Fernández (1921–2010), footballer player.
- Maya Fernández (born 1971), biologist, veterinarian and politician.
- Andrés Gabriel Ferrada Moreira (born 1969), archbishop of the Catholic Church.
- Emiliano Figueroa (1866–1931), politician.
- Alberto Fouillioux (1940–2018), footballer midfielder and striker.
- Eduardo Frei Montalva (1911–1982), President of Chile.
- Eduardo Frei Ruiz-Tagle (born 1942), President of Chile.
- Ramón Freire (1787–1851), President of Chile.
- Juan Francisco Fresno (1914–2004), cardinal of the Roman Catholic Church.

== G ==
- Manuel Gaete (1948–2003), football player.
- Ricardo Gálvez (1933–2024), lawyer, judge, and university professor.
- Miguel Ángel Gamboa (born 1951), football player.
- Jorge Gambra (born 1963), table tennis player.
- Fernando García (born 1930), composer.
- Rolando García (born 1942), footballer defender.
- Cristian Garín (born 1996), tennis player.
- Eduardo Gatti (born 1949), singer-songwriter.
- Rodrigo Gómez (born 1968), footballer player.
- Fernando González (born 1980), tennis player.
- Hugo González (born 1963), footballer player.
- Jorge González von Marées (1900–1962), political figure and author.
- Juan Francisco González (1853–1933), one of the four Great Chilean Masters and as the archetypal romantic bohemian artist of the early 20th century.
- Rafael González (born 1950), footballer midfielder.
- Tomás Osvaldo González Morales (1935–2022), Roman Catholic bishop.
- Adelina Gutiérrez (1925–2015), scientist, academic and professor of astrophysics.
- Juan Gutiérrez (born 1964), footballer player.
- Jaime Guzmán (1946–1991), constitutional law professor, politician, and founding member of the conservative Independent Democratic Union party.

== H ==
- Felipe Gálvez Haberle (born 1983), film director, screenwriter, and editor.
- Alejandra Herrera (born 1971), actress.
- Leonel Herrera (born 1971), footballer player.
- Héctor Hoffens (born 1957), footballer player.
- Fernando Hurtado (born 1983), footballer player.

== I ==
- Raimundo Infante (1926–1986), footballer forward.
- Alfonso de Iruarrizaga (born 1957), sport shooter.
- Yashir Islame (born 1991), footballer player.
- Lorenza Izzo (born 1989), actress and model.

== J ==
- Alberto Jara Franzoy (1929–2019), Roman Catholic bishop.
- Nicolás Jarry (born 1995), tennis player.
- Alberto Jerez Horta (1927–2023), lawyer and politician.
- Pamela Jiles (born 1960), journalist and politician.
- Luis Jiménez (born 1984), footballer player.
- Luz Jiménez (born 1934), actress, theater director, and teacher.
- Francisco Juillet (1898–1987), cyclist.

== K ==
- Roberto Kettlun (born 1981), footballer player.
- Katty Kowaleczko (born 1964), actress.
- Benjamín Kuscevic (born 1996), footballer player.

== L ==
- Amanda Labarca (1886–1975), diplomat, educator, writer and feminist.
- Alberto Labarthe (1928–2021), sprinter.
- Enrique Lafourcade (1927–2019), writer, critic and journalist.
- Ricardo Lagos (born 1938), lawyer, economist and social-democratic politician.
- Gonzalo Lama (born 1993), tennis player.
- Luis Larraín (1980–2023), LGBT rights activist.
- Francisco de la Lastra (1777–1852), military officer and the first Supreme Director of Chile (1814).
- Joaquín Lavín (born 1953), politician.
- Braulio Leal (born 1981), footballer coach and former player.
- Yerko Leiva (born 1998), footballer player.
- Sebastián Lelio (born 1974), director, screenwriter, editor and producer.
- Alfonso Leng (1884–1974), post-romantic composer of classical music.
- Hugo Lepe (1940–1991), footballer defender.
- Mario Lepe (born 1965), footballer player.
- Pedro Lira (1845–1912), painter and art critic.
- Sergio Livingstone (1920–2012), goalkeeper.
- Claudio Lizama (born 1973), footballer player.
- Anita Lizana (1915–1994), tennis player.
- Frank Lobos (born 1976), footballer player.
- Mariana Loyola (born 1975), theater, film, and television actress.
- Orlando Lübbert (born 1945), screenwriter and film director.

== M ==
- María Fernanda Mackenna (born 1986), sprinter.
- Javier Margas (born 1969), football player.
- John Marshall (born 1942), sailor and Olympic medalist.
- Hans Martínez (born 1987), football player.
- Rubén Martínez (born 1964), football player.
- Hernán Masanés (1931–2018), cyclist.
- Roberto Matta (1911–2002), painter.
- Humberto Maturana (1928–2021), biologist and philosopher.
- Marcos Segundo Maturana (1830–1892), military and art collector.
- Gary Medel (born 1987), football player.
- Jorge Medina (1926–2021), prelate of the Catholic Church.
- Rodrigo Meléndez (born 1977), football player.
- Óscar Meneses (born 1960), football player and manager.
- Sergio Messen (1949–2010), football player.
- Marcelo Miranda (born 1967), footballer player and manager.
- Milovan Mirošević (born 1980), footballer player.
- Juan Esteban Montero (1879–1948), President of Chile.
- Pedro Montt (1849–1910), President of Chile.
- Mario Moreno (1935–2005), footballer player.
- Günther Mund (1934–2011), diver.
- Cristián Muñoz (born 1983), footballer player and manager.

== N ==
- Rodrigo Naranjo (born 1979), footballer player.
- Manuel Neira (born 1977), footballer player.
- Lucas Nervi (born 2001), athlete.
- Joaquín Niemann (born 1998), golfer.
- Francisco Nitsche (1930–2018), footballer player.
- Amparo Noguera (born 1965), television, theatre and film actress.
- Rodrigo Núñez (born 1977), footballer midfielder.

== O ==
- Rafael Olarra (born 1978), football player.
- Luis Olivares (1939–2024), football player.
- Raúl Olivares (born 1988), football player.
- Juvenal Olmos (born 1962), football manager.
- Carlos Ominami (born 1950), economist and politician, former parliamentarian and former Chilean Minister of State.
- Fabián Orellana (born 1986), footballer player.
- Juan Carlos Orellana (1955–2022), footballer manager.
- Juan Orrego-Salas (1919–2019), composer, musicologist, music critic, and academic.
- Pascual Ortega Portales (1839–1899), painter.
- José Tomás Ovalle (1787–1831), political figure.

== P ==
- Andrés Palacios (born 1975), telenovela actor.
- Guillermo Páez (born 1945), footballer player.
- Juan Páez (born 1950), footballer player and manager.
- Cote de Pablo (born 1979), actress and singer.
- Jaime Parada (born 1977), gay rights activist and politician.
- Nelson Parraguez (born 1971), footballer midfielder.
- Pedro Pascal (born 1975), actor.
- Esteban Pavez (born 1990), footballer player.
- Manuel Pellegrini (born 1953), footballer player and manager.
- Jorge Pellicer (born 1966), footballer player and manager.
- Jorge Peredo (born 1953), footballer player.
- José Joaquín Pérez (1801–1889), political figure.
- Eros Pérez (born 1976), footballer, manager and journalist.
- Luis Pérez (born 1965), footballer player and manager.
- José Perotti Ronzoni (1898–1956), sculptor.
- Henriette Petit (1894–1983), painter.
- César Pinares (born 1991), footballer player.
- Jean Paul Pineda (born 1989), footballer player.
- José Piñera (born 1948), economist.
- Miguel Piñera (1954–2025), celebrity, night club owner and amateur musician.
- Sebastián Piñera (1949–2024), billionaire businessman and President of Chile.
- Aníbal Pinto (1825–1884), President of Chile.
- Francisco Antonio Pinto (1785–1858), President of Chile.
- Ignacio Carrera Pinto (1848–1882), hero of the War of the Pacific.
- Damián Pizarro (born 2005), footballer player.
- Jaime Pizarro (born 1964), politician, teacher, and former footballer player.
- Miguel Ponce (born 1971), footballer player and manager.
- Diego Portales (1793–1837), statesman and entrepreneur.
- Belus Prajoux (born 1955), tennis player.
- Francisco Javier Prado Aránguiz (1929–2020), Roman Catholic bishop.
- Pedro Prado (1886–1952), writer and architect.
- Andrés Prieto (1928–2022), footballer forward.
- Ignacio Prieto (born 1943), footballer player.

== Q ==
- Ricardo Queraltó (born 1976), footballer player.
- José Quezada (born 1990), footballer player.
- Alberto Quintano (born 1946), footballer player.
- Waldo Quiroz (born 1949), footballer player.

== R ==
- Jaime Ramírez (footballer, born 1931) (1931–2003), footballer player.
- Jaime Ramírez (footballer, born 1967) (born 1967), footballer player.
- Marcelo Ramírez (born 1965), footballer goalkeeper.
- Miguel Ramírez (born 1970), footballer manager and former player.
- Orlando Ramírez (1943–2018), footballer forward.
- Luis Fernando Ramos Pérez (born 1959), prelate of the Catholic Church.
- Rosita Renard (1894–1949), classical pianist.
- Miguel Riffo (born 1981), footballer player.
- Marcelo Ríos (born 1975), tennis player.
- Hernán Rodríguez (born 1933), footballer player.
- Manuel Rodríguez (1939–2018), footballer defender.
- Manuel Rodríguez Erdoíza (1785–1818), lawyer and guerrilla leader.
- Juan Rodríguez Vega (1944–2021), footballer manager and former player.
- Manuel Rodríguez Vega (born 1942), footballer manager and former player.
- Andrés Romero (born 1967), footballer defender.
- Claudio Romero (born 2000), track and field athlete.
- David Rosenmann-Taub (1927–2023), poet, musician and artist.
- Sebastián Rozental (born 1976), footballer player.
- Patricio Rubio (born 1989), footballer player.
- Eduardo Frei Ruiz-Tagle (born 1942), politician and civil engineer.
- Francisco Ruiz-Tagle (1790–1860), political figure.

== S ==
- Ignacio Saavedra (born 1999), footballer player.
- Arturo Salah (born 1949), footballer manager and former player.
- Eliseo Salazar (born 1954), racing driver.
- Leonel Sánchez (1936–2022), footballer player.
- Juan Luis Sanfuentes (1885–1930), President of Chile between 1915 and 1920.
- Domingo Santa María (1825–1889), political figure.
- Horatio Sanz (born 1969), actor and comedian.
- Matías Sborowitz (born 1993), tennis player.
- Leon Schidlowsky (1931–2022), composer and painter.
- Carolina Schmidt (born 1967), politician and businesswoman.
- Alex von Schwedler (born 1980), footballer player.
- Lupe Serrano (1930–2023), ballet dancer and teacher.
- Miguel Serrano (1917–2009), diplomat, writer, occultist, and fascist activist.
- José Luis Sierra (footballer, born 1968) (born 1968), footballer coach and former player.
- José Luis Sierra (footballer, born 1997) (born 1997), footballer player.
- Francisco Sierralta (born 1997), footballer player.
- Sebastián Silva (born 1979), director, actor, screenwriter, painter, and musician.
- Antonio Smith (1832–1877), landscape painter, engraver, caricaturist and art teacher.
- Jorge Socías (born 1951), footballer player.
- Ester Soré (1915–1996), singer.
- Guillermo Soto (born 1994), footballer player.
- Juan Soto (footballer, born 1937) (1937–2014), footballer manager and former player.
- Juan Soto (footballer, born 1956) (born 1956), footballer player.
- Sergio Arellano Stark (1921–2016), military officer.
- Vernon Steele (1882–1955), actor.
- Ralf Steinmetz (born 1956), computer scientist and electrical engineer.
- Gabriel Suazo (born 1997), footballer player.
- Juan Subercaseaux (1896–1942), Roman Catholic archbishop.
- Luis Subercaseaux (1882–1973), diplomat and athlete.

== T ==
- Héctor Tapia (born 1977), footballer manager and former player.
- Sussan Taunton (born 1970), actress.
- Roberto Thieme (1942–2023), furniture maker, painter, and politician.
- Patricio Toledo (born 1962), footballer player.
- Rodrigo Toloza (born 1984), footballer player.
- Jorge Toro (1939–2024), footballer who played as a midfielder.
- Sebastián Toro (born 1990), footballer player.
- Michael Tregor (born 1950), television actor.
- Manuel Trucco (1875–1954), politician and provisional vice president of Chile in 1931.
- Luka Tudor (born 1969), footballer player.

== U ==
- Tito Ureta (1935–2012), biochemist.

== V ==
- Diego Valdés (born 1994), footballer player.
- Francisco Valdés Subercaseaux (1908–1982), Roman Catholic prelate.
- Hernán Valdés (1934–2023), writer.
- Jaime Valdés (born 1981), footballer midfielder.
- José Miguel Valdés (1837–1898), political figure and liberal politician.
- Sergio Valdés (1933–2019), footballer defender.
- Esteban Valencia (footballer, born 1972) (born 1972), footballer manager and former player.
- Esteban Valencia (footballer, born 1999) (born 1999), footballer player.
- Gonzalo Valenzuela (born 1978), actor.
- Alex Varas (born 1976), footballer goalkeeper.
- Francisco Varela (1946–2001), biologist, philosopher, cybernetician, and neuroscientist.
- Leonor Varela (born 1972), actress.
- Eduardo Vargas (born 1989), footballer player.
- Eugenio Cruz Vargas (1923–2014), poet and painter.
- Jorge Vargas (born 1976), footballer manager and former footballer defender.
- Jaime Vera (born 1963), footballer manager and former player.
- Fernando Vergara (born 1970), footballer coach and former player.
- Vicar (1934–2012), cartoonist.
- Francisco Ramón Vicuña (1775–1849), political figure.
- Laura Vicuña (1891–1904), child who was beatified by the Roman Catholic Church.
- Arturo Vidal (born 1987), footballer player.
- Martín Vidaurre (born 2000), cross-country mountain biker.
- Hugo Villanueva (1939–2024), footballer defender.
- Marco Villaseca (born 1975), footballer midfielder.
- Antonio Vodanovic (born 1949), television presenter.
- Cristian Vogel (born 1972), experimental electronic musician.

== W ==
- Martina Weil (born 1999), track and field athlete.
- Oscar Wirth (born 1955), footballer manager and former footballer goalkeeper.
- Alexander Witt (born 1952), filmmaker and cinematographer.
- Egon Wolff (1926–2016), playwright and author.
- Andrés Wood (born 1965), film director, producer and writer.

== Y ==
- Bastián Yáñez (born 2001), footballer player.
- Eliodoro Yáñez (1860–1932), journalist, lawyer, and politician.
- Guillermo Yávar (born 1943), footballer forward.
- Manuel José Yrarrázaval Larraín (1834–1896), lawyer and politician.
- Paz Yrarrázabal (1931–2010), actress.
- Juan Ignacio de la Carrera Yturgoyen (1620–1682), soldier.

== Z ==
- Mónica Zalaquett (born 1962), business and political communicator.
- Andrés Zaldívar (born 1936), Christian Democrat politician.
- Iván Zamorano (born 1967), footballer player.
- Camila Zárate Zárate (born 1992), political activist.
- Antonia Zegers (born 1972), actress.
- José Ignacio Zenteno (1786–1847), soldier, politician and hero of the Chilean War of Independence.
- Alia Trabucco Zerán (born 1983), writer.
- Elisa Zulueta (born 1981), television, theatre and film actress.
