= Errázuriz Family =

Chilean political and clerical family

- Political and clerical family
- Country: Chile
- Origin: Arantza, Navarre
- Founded: 18th century
- Founder: Francisco Javier Errázuriz Larraín
- Connected families: Edwards family Larraín family Subercaseaux family

The Errázuriz family is a Chilean political and clerical family of Basque descent. Founded by Francisco Javier Errázuriz Larraín, Errázuriz arrived in Chile in 1735. The Errázuriz family held particular importance in Chilean politics during the nineteenth and early twentieth century.

== History ==
In 1735, Errázuriz arrived in Chile from Arantza, Navarra to work at the business of his uncle Santiago Larraín. Through family connections Errázuriz was later able to found his own merchant business.

== Members ==
- Francisco Javier Errázuriz Larraín (1711–1767), merchant, landowner and founder of the Errázuriz Family; married María Loreto de Madariaga y Jáuregui.
  - Francisco Javier de Errázuriz Madariaga (born 1744), merchant and landowner; married Rosa Martínez de Aldunate y Guerrero.
    - Francisco Javier Errázuriz Aldunate (1773–1845), Sergeant major, military officer and politician; married Ignacia Aldunate y Larraín, Josefa Zañartu y Manso de Velasco and Rosario Valdivieso y Zañartu
      - Federico Errázuriz Zañartu (1825–1877) lawyer, politician, and 8th President of Chile; married Eulogia Echaurren (1830–1887), First Lady from 1871 to 1876.
        - Federico Errázuriz Echaurren (1850–1901), politician and 13th President of Chile; married Gertrudis Echenique (1849 –1928), First Lady from 1896 to 1901.
          - Federico Errázuriz Echenique (1880–1903), lawyer and politician.
        - Javier Errázuriz Echaurren (1853–1913), a lawyer and politician; married Regina Mena Varas.
        - Ladislao Errázuriz Echaurren (1856–1897), a farmer and politician; married Rosa Lazcano Echaurren.
          - Ladislao Errázuriz Lazcano (1882–1941), lawyer and politician; married Blanca Pereira Iñíguez
            - Ladislao Errázuriz Pereira (1909–1981), lawyer and politician; married Amelia Talavera Balmaceda
              - Francisco Javier Errázuriz Talavera (1942–2024), businessman and politician; married María Victoria Ovalle (born 1947), politician
        - María Errázuriz Echaurren (1861–1922), the First Lady from 1901 to 1906; married Germán Riesco (1854–1916), lawyer, politician and 14th President of Chile.
          - Germán Ignacio Riesco (1888–1958), lawyer and politician; married Rosa Barceló Pinto.
      - Maximiano Errázuriz Valdivieso (1832–1890), surveyor, politician, industrialist and winemaker; married Amalia Urmeneta Quiroga.
        - José Tomás Errázuriz (1856–1927), painter and diploma; married Eugenia Huici Arguedas de Errázuriz (1860–1951) patron of the arts
        - Amalia Errázuriz de Subercaseaux (née Errázuriz Urmeneta; 1860–1930) writer of Catholic devotional literature, one of Chile's first travel writers and co-founder of the Chilean Ladies League; married Ramón Subercaseaux Vicuña (1854–1937) politician, diplomat, painter and member of the Subercaseaux family.
          - Pedro Subercaseaux (1880–1956), painter and Benedictine monk; married Elvira Lyon Otaégui (Note: Later annulled by the Pope so that both could join religious orders)
          - Luis Subercaseaux (1882–1973), diplomat and athlete
          - Blanca Subercaseaux de Valdés (1880s – 1965), a writer and artist; married Horacio Valdés Ortúzar, an engineer
            - Francisco Valdés Subercaseaux (1908–1982) Franciscan friar and Prelate
            - Gabriel Valdés (1919–2011) politician, lawyer and diplomat; married Sylvia Soublette (1924–2020), composer, singer, choirmaster and educator.
              - Juan Gabriel Valdés (born 1947) political scientist and diplomat
          - Juan Subercaseaux (1896–1942), Archbishop of La Serena.
        - Rafael Errázuriz Urmeneta (1861–1923), a politician and diplomat; married Josefina Quesney Mackenna.
      - Crescente Errázuriz (1839–1931), Dominican friar, Prelate, professor, writer and historian
    - Fernando Errázuriz Aldunate (1777–1841), politician and Provisional President of Chile during 1831; married María del Carmen Sotomayor (c. 1780 – 1852), First Lady during 1831.
  - María del Carmen de Errázuriz Madariaga (born 1745); married Luis Manuel de Zañartu (1723–1782), politician and magistrate.
  - José Antonio de Errázuriz Madariaga (1747–1821), Catholic Priest, Presbyter, lawyer and politician.
  - Domingo de Errázuriz Madariaga (1754–1821), priest, lawyer and Canon
  - Santiago de Errázuriz Madariaga (1755– 1823), Maestre de campo, lawyer and merchant; married Juana de Dios de Elzo y Ureta

== Other notable members ==
- Blanca Errázuriz (1894–1940), socialite known for shooting her ex-husband John de Saulles (1878–1917), an American football player and coach, real estate broker, and businessperson; later married Fernando Santa Cruz Wilson
- Luz Vergara Errazuriz (1927–2014), great-granddaughter of Fernando Errázuriz Aldunate; married Eugenio Cruz Vargas (1923–2014), poet and painter
- Francisco Javier Errázuriz Ossa (born 1933), prelate, Cardinal and former Archdiocese of Santiago
- Hernán Felipe Errázuriz (born 1945), lawyer, diplomat and politician
- Jaime Jorge Guzmán Errázuriz (1946–1991) constitutional lawyer, professor, far-right politician, founder of the Independent Democratic Union, collaborator during the military dictatorship, and member of the Edwards family; assassinated in 1991 by the Manuel Rodríguez Patriotic Front.

== See also ==
- History of Chile
