= Gabriel Valdés =

Chilean politician and diplomat

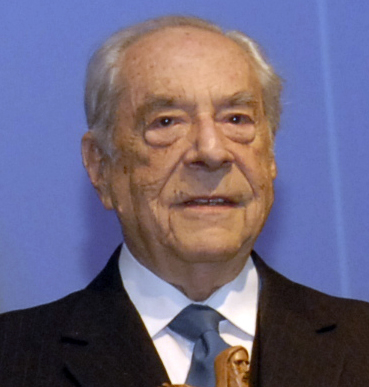

Ambassador of Chile to Italy
- In office 11 March 2006 – 2008
- President: Michelle Bachelet
- Preceded by: José Goñi
- Succeeded by: Cristián Barros

Member of the Senate
- In office 11 March 1990 – 11 March 2006
- Preceded by: District created
- Succeeded by: Eduardo Frei Ruiz-Tagle
- Constituency: 16th Circumscription

President of the Senate
- In office 11 March 1990 – 12 March 1996
- Preceded by: Eduardo Frei Montalva
- Succeeded by: Sergio Diez

Minister of Foreign Affairs
- In office 3 November 1964 – 3 November 1970
- President: Eduardo Frei Montalva
- Preceded by: Julio Philippi
- Succeeded by: Clodomiro Almeyda

Personal details
- Born: 3 July 1919 Santiago, Chile
- Died: 7 September 2011 (aged 92) Santiago, Chile
- Party: Christian Democratic Party (1957−2011)
- Other political affiliations: National Falange (1939−1957)
- Spouse: Sylvia Soublette (m. 1946)
- Relations: Francisco Valdés Subercaseaux (brother); Ramón Subercaseaux Vicuña (grandfather); Amalia Errázuriz de Subercaseaux (grandmother); Pedro Subercaseaux (uncle); Luis Subercaseaux (uncle); Juan Subercaseaux (uncle)
- Children: 4, including Juan Gabriel Valdés; Maximiano Valdés
- Parent: Blanca Subercaseaux de Valdés (mother)
- Education: Pontifical Catholic University of Chile, LL.B, 1945; Paris Institute of Political Studies, 1952
- Occupation: Politician
- Profession: Lawyer

Gabriel Valdés Subercaseaux (3 July 1919 – 7 September 2011) was a Chilean politician, lawyer and diplomat. Valdes served as the Minister of Foreign Affairs of Chile under President Eduardo Frei Montalva from 1964 to 1970. A vocal opponent of the military dictatorship of Augusto Pinochet, which held power from 1973 to 1990, Valdés worked for Chile's transition to democracy.

During his tenure as Minister of Foreign Affairs the Alto Palena–Encuentro River dispute was solved under the 1966 arbitration award in which Queen Elizabeth II mediated. Also the killing of Hernán Merino in the Laguna del Desierto incident happen in 1965.

Valdés served as President of the Senate of Chile, considered the second most important office in the country after the presidency, from 1990 to 1996. He retired from the Senate in 2006.

== Early life and family ==
Valdés was born in Santiago, Chile, on 3 July 1919. He was the son of Horacio Valdés Ortúzar, an engineer, and Blanca Subercaseaux de Valdés (née Subercaseaux Errázuriz), a writer and artist. Through his father Valdés was a member of the Chilean Valdés family. Through his mother Valdés was a member of the Subercaseaux and Errázuriz family, and was the grandson of Ramón Subercaseaux Vicuña and Amalia Errázuriz de Subercaseaux. One of five children, Valdés was the younger brother of Francisco Valdés Subercaseaux.

He completed his secondary education at the Colegio San Ignacio in Santiago and at the Scuola San Giuseppe in Rome, Italy. He pursued higher education at the Faculty of Law of the Pontifical Catholic University of Chile, where he obtained a degree in Legal and Social Sciences in 1945 with a thesis titled Christian conception of the origin of power. He was later admitted to the bar before the Supreme Court of Chile.

Between 1945 and 1946, he served as president of the Catholic University Students Association. He received a scholarship from the French government to pursue studies in Economics and Legislation at the Paris Institute of Political Studies between 1951 and 1952.

== Professional career ==
Valdés began his professional career in 1946 as a lawyer at the Compañía de Acero del Pacífico (CAP), where he later rose to managerial positions.

Between 1960 and 1964, he was a member of the board of the Latin American Iron and Steel Institute (ILAFA). Concurrently, between 1952 and 1954, he served as a professor of Economic Law at the Faculty of Law of the Pontifical Catholic University of Chile. During this period, he was also a director of Sociedad Editorial del Pacífico S.A. and Sociedad Radiodifusora Latinoamericana. Between 1958 and 1960, he was director of the newspaper La Libertad, serving in 1959 as head of its legal department and, from 1960, as deputy general manager.

== Political career ==
Valdés began his political career early, becoming in 1939 one of the founders of the Falange Nacional, the precursor of the Christian Democratic Party, in which he remained a member throughout his life.

During the government of President Eduardo Frei Montalva, he served as Minister of Foreign Affairs from 3 November 1964 to 3 September 1970. During the same administration, he also served as acting Minister of the Interior (9–10 May 1970) and acting Minister of National Defense (20 March–5 April 1970).

In 1971, he was appointed by the United Nations Secretary-General as Assistant Secretary-General of the United Nations Development Programme (UNDP) for Latin America and the Caribbean for a two-year term, which was later extended until 1981. After completing his initial period at the UN, he returned to Chile to assist in political efforts aimed at resolving the national crisis prior to the military coup of 11 September 1973. He later returned to New York, where he was when the institutional breakdown occurred in Costa Rica.

In 1982, he returned to Chile and was elected president of the Christian Democratic Party, a position he held until 1987.year, he was detained along with other leaders of his party.

On 14 March 1983, he signed the Democratic Manifesto, together with opposition leaders to the military government, including Patricio Aylwin, Hugo Zepeda, Enrique Silva Cimma, and Luis Bossay. This document led to the formation of the Democratic Alliance on 6 August 1983 at the Club Español in Santiago. During the mass protests of that year, he was detained along with other leaders of his party.

=== Transition to democracy: 1985–1990 ===
On 25 August 1985, he participated in the drafting and signing of the National Accord in pursuit of a political solution to the military dictatorship. Although the Democratic Alliance dissolved in 1987, it served as the basis for the creation of the National Command for the «No», which confronted the 5 October 1988 plebiscite.

During this period, he also served as a member of the World Committee for the Reform of UNESCO, a member of the Council of the Club of Rome, a United Nations consultant in Latin America, Asia, and Africa, founder and president of the Latin American Forum, founder and president of the board of the Centro de Estudios del Desarrollo (CED), and a member of the Club of Vienna.

=== Democratic era: 1990–2011 ===
Following the victory of the “No” in the 5 October 1988 plebiscite, he launched a campaign to become the Christian Democratic Party’s presidential candidate. Although promoted by his supporters as “the best man of the Christian Democratic Party for Chile,” he ultimately withdrew his candidacy.

In the first democratic elections held on 14 December 1989, he was elected senator for the 16th Senatorial District, Los Lagos Region, obtaining 102,784 votes (41.99% of the valid votes), the highest vote share in the district. He was re-elected in the parliamentary elections of 11 December 1997 with 93,375 votes (43.18%), again securing first place in the district. He chose not to seek re-election in 2005.

In 2006, President Michelle Bachelet appointed him Ambassador of Chile to Italy and Permanent Representative to the Food and Agriculture Organization (FAO).

== Personal life ==
In 1946, Valdés married the composer Sylvia Soublette. Valdés and Soublette had four children including Juan Gabriel Valdés, Chile's former Ambassador to the United States, and Maximiano Valdés, musician and conductor, former music director of the Buffalo Philharmonic Orchestra.

Valdés died from bronchitis on 7 September 2011, at his home in Santiago, Chile, at the age of 92. He had recently been admitted as a patient at Clínica Alemana for treatment of a long illness.
