= Pedro Subercaseaux =

Chilean painter

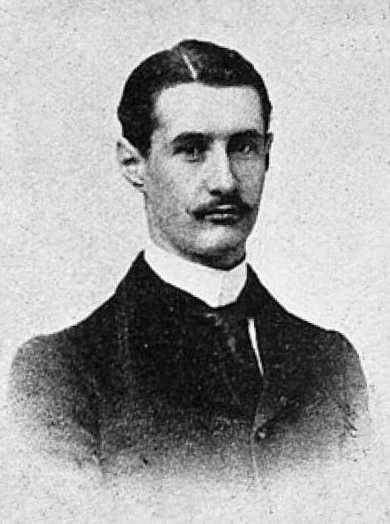
- Subercaseaux in 1903
- Born: Pedro León Maximiano María Subercaseaux Errázuriz; 10 December 1880; Rome, Kingdom of Italy
- Died: 3 January 1956 (aged 75); Santiago, Chile
- Spouse: Elvira Lyon Otaégui (m. 1907, annulled)
- Parents: Ramón Subercaseaux Vicuña (father) (father); Amalia Errázuriz de Subercaseaux (mother)
- Relatives: Blanca Subercaseaux de Valdés (sister); Luis Subercaseaux (brother); Juan Subercaseaux (brother); Rafael Errázuriz Urmeneta (brother); Federico Errázuriz Zañartu (uncle); Eulogia Echaurren (aunt); Carmen Quiroga de Urmeneta (grandmother)
- Family: Errázuriz family Subercaseaux family

Pedro Subercaseaux Errázuriz (Spanish pronunciation: [ˈpeðɾo suβeɾkaˈso]; December 10, 1880 – January 3, 1956) was a Chilean painter, son of the painter and diplomat Ramón Subercaseaux Vicuña. He painted many portraits about events from the history of Chile, such as the Crossing of the Andes. He painted portraits of the history of Argentina requested during the Argentina Centennial. He married Elvira Lyon Otaégui in 1907, but the Pope later annulled their marriage so that they could both get into religious orders.

== Life and career ==
He studied in Europe, developing his artistic vocation under the instruction of his father. In 1896 he entered the Royal Higher Academy of Art in Berlin and in 1899 he studied in the workshop of Lorenzo Vallés and at the Free School in Rome. In 1900 he moved to Paris to enter the Académie Julian.

Under the pseudonym of P.S., he worked as a cartoonist for El Diario Ilustrado from 1902. He was in charge of the illustrations of the colonial legends of Joaquín Díaz Garcés and of the police stories of Alberto Edwards for the Pacífico Magazine. From 1906 and parallel to his life as a painter, he achieved notoriety as a caricaturist and illustrator in different publications born under the auspices of the new journalism of the early 20th century. His illustrations, often done in watercolor, lit up the covers of Zig-Zag magazine, the sobering serials of Familia magazine, the pages of Pacífico Magazine and those of El Diario Ilustrado. He also ventured into book illustration, among which his prints for Tierra de Oceano, by Benjamín Subercaseaux, stand out. However, Pedro Subercaseaux's main contribution as an illustrator was the creation, in 1906, of Baron Von Pilsener, the first Chilean comic book character, who made his creator a pioneer of comics in Chile.

In 1908 the Argentine Government acquired his painting "El Abrazo de Maipú", an image that was later reproduced for banknotes and postcards.

Pedro was the only South American painter to have been commissioned to paint a portrait of a Pope (Pius X) for the Vatican Gallery of Popes. He had to go twice: in 1911 to make the painting dressed in tails (as required by protocol), and thirty-six years later, to paint a golden halo on the head of the Pope who had been canonized.

During the year 1913 and at the request of the presidents of the Chilean Parliament, Pedro Subercaseaux painted "Discovery of Chile", a work that occupies the Hall of Honor of the former National Congress. In 1920, the Subercaseaux-Lyon couple obtained a papal dispensation that enabled them to dissolve their marriage. Both retired, separately, to European monasteries, where they began their religious life. In 1927, Pedro was ordained a Benedictine priest. From then on, he devoted himself to the creation of works of art with religious content, such as the illustration of books on the life of San Francisco and San Benito and the decoration of churches for different parishes throughout Chile. In 1937 he completed the painting of Pius X by adding a halo, a sign of the recent beatification of the pontiff. In 1946 he painted his famous painting, El Joven Lautaro.

In 1956 Pedro Subercaseaux died. He is buried in the cemetery of the monastery, today Benedictine Abbey of the Santísima Trinidad de Las Condes.

== Gallery ==
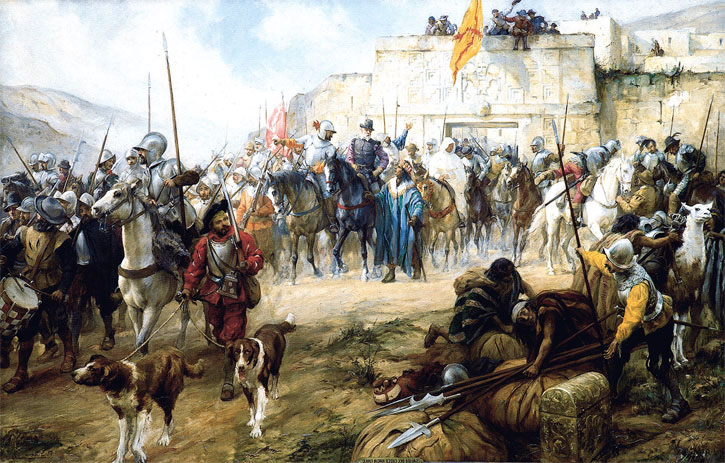
Almagro's expedition to Chile (Date unknown)

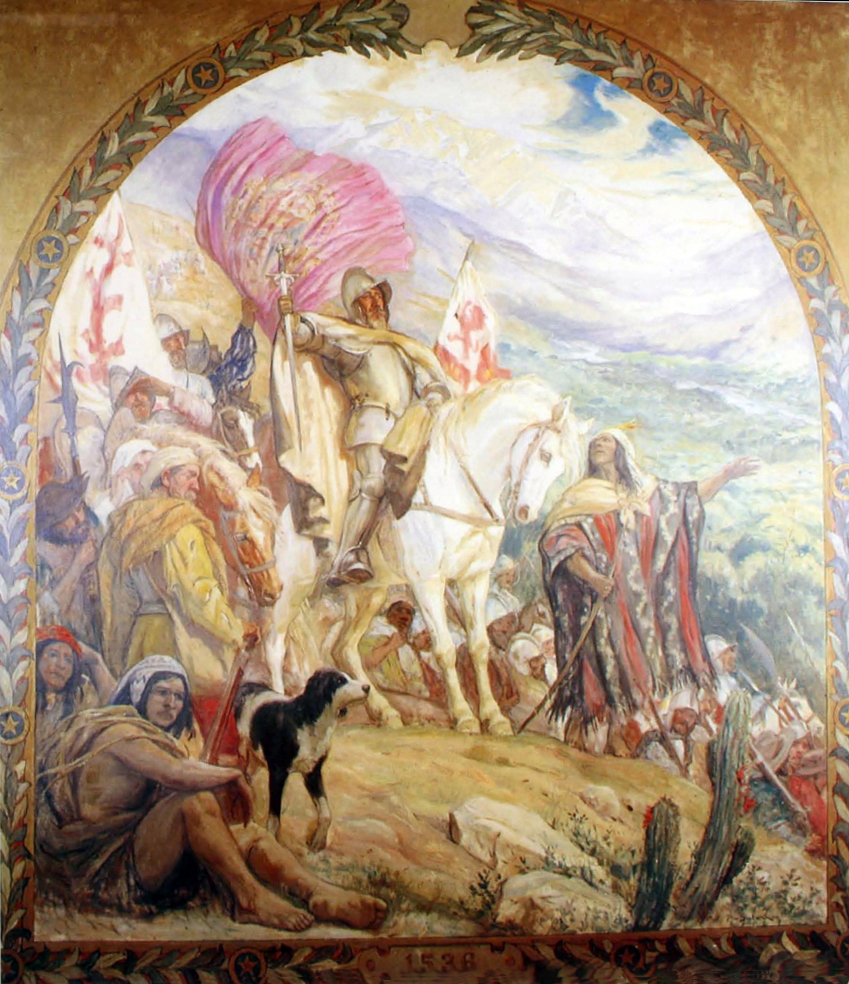
Discovery of Chile by Diego de Almagro (Date unknown)

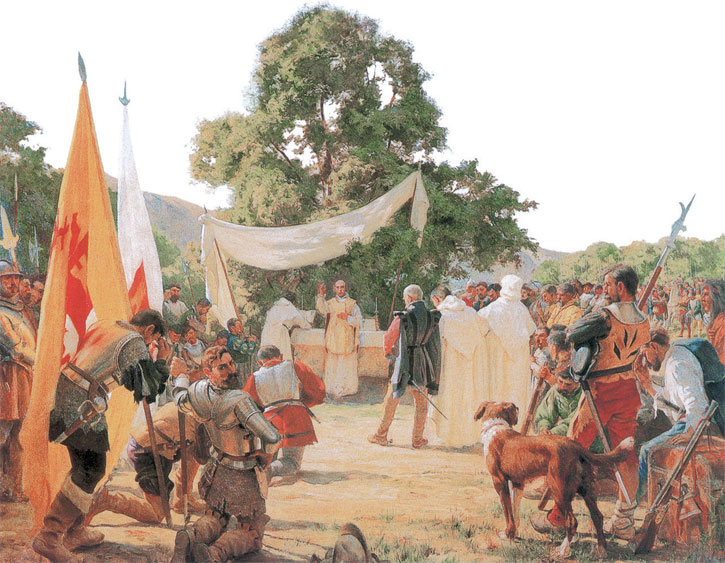
First mass in Chile (1904)

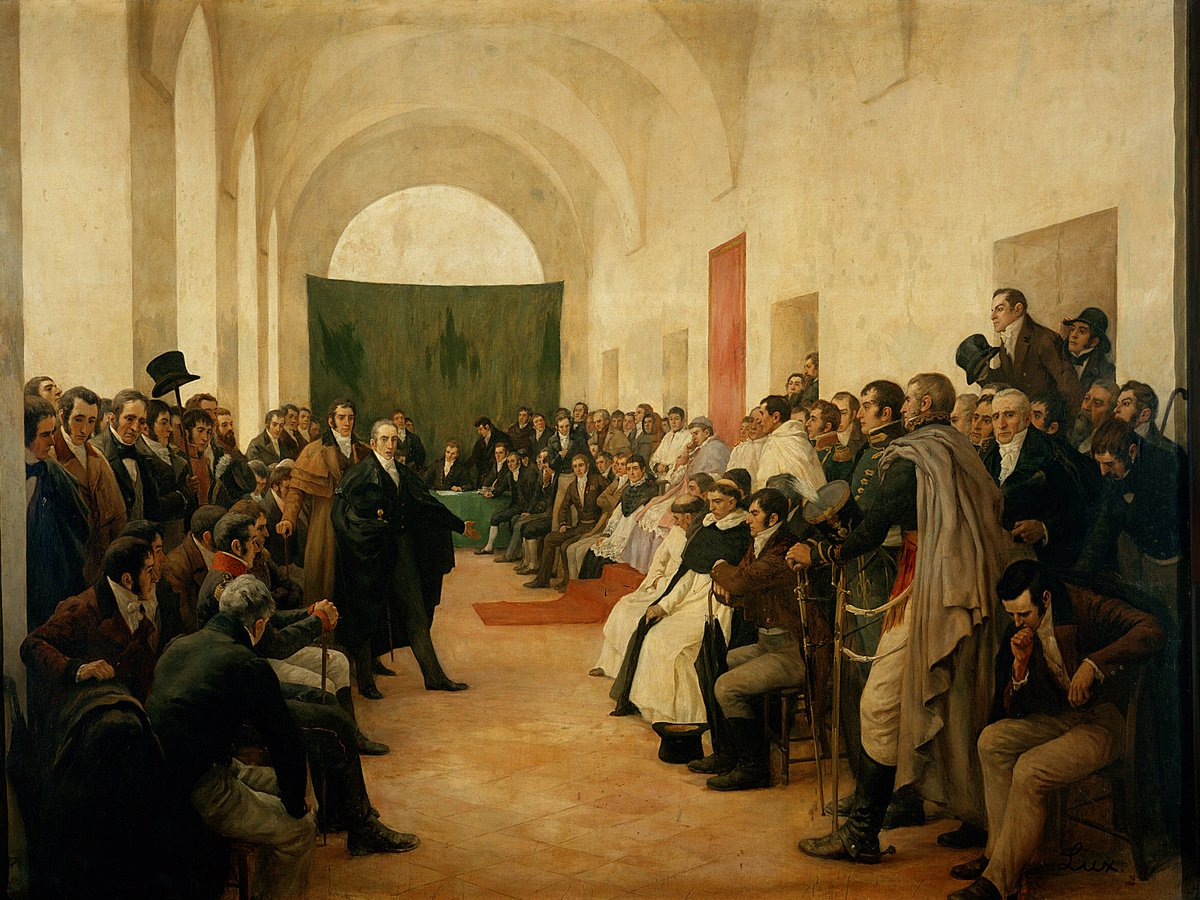
Open Cabildo of 22 May 1810 (1908)

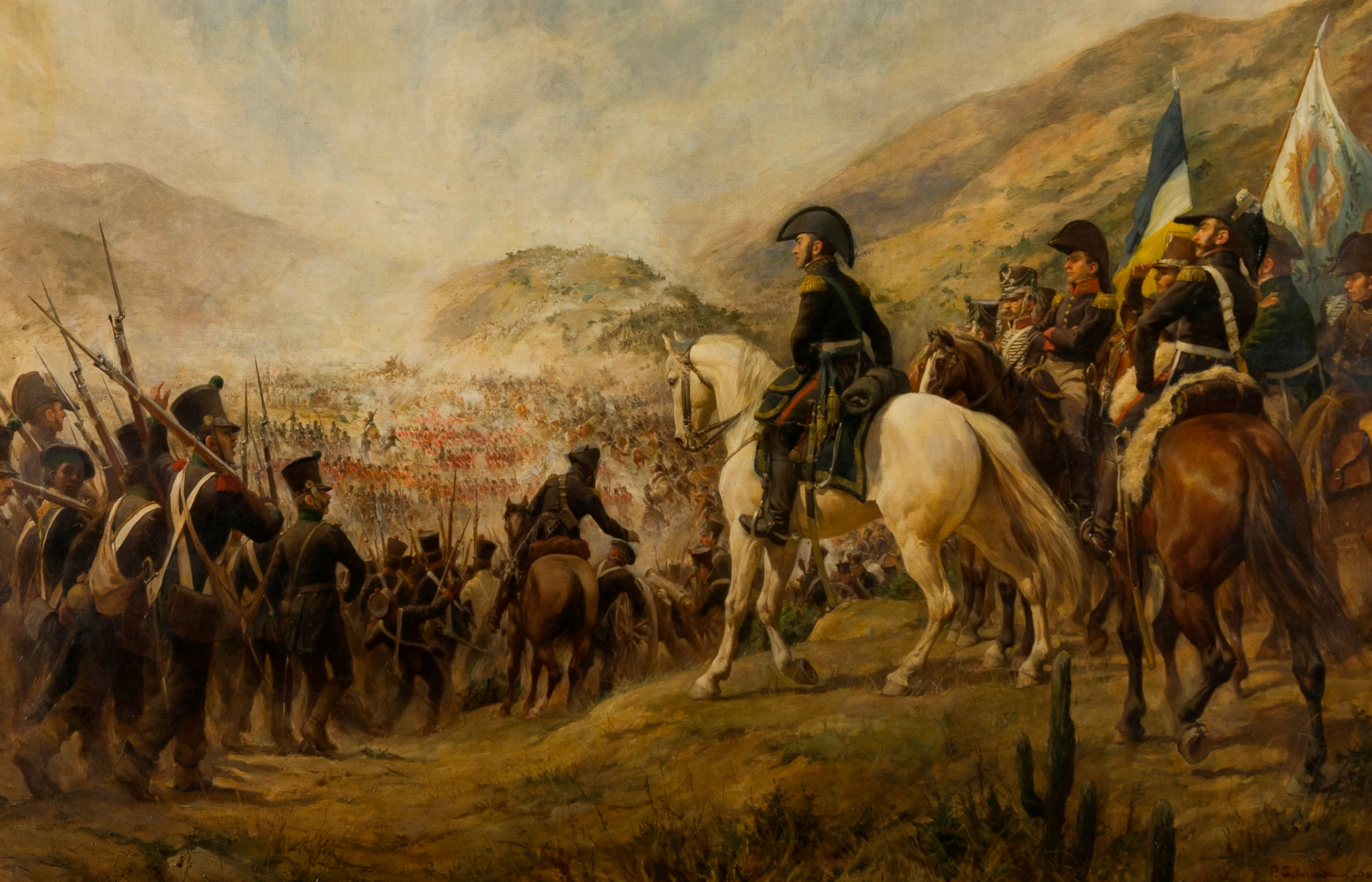
Battle of Chacabuco (1908)

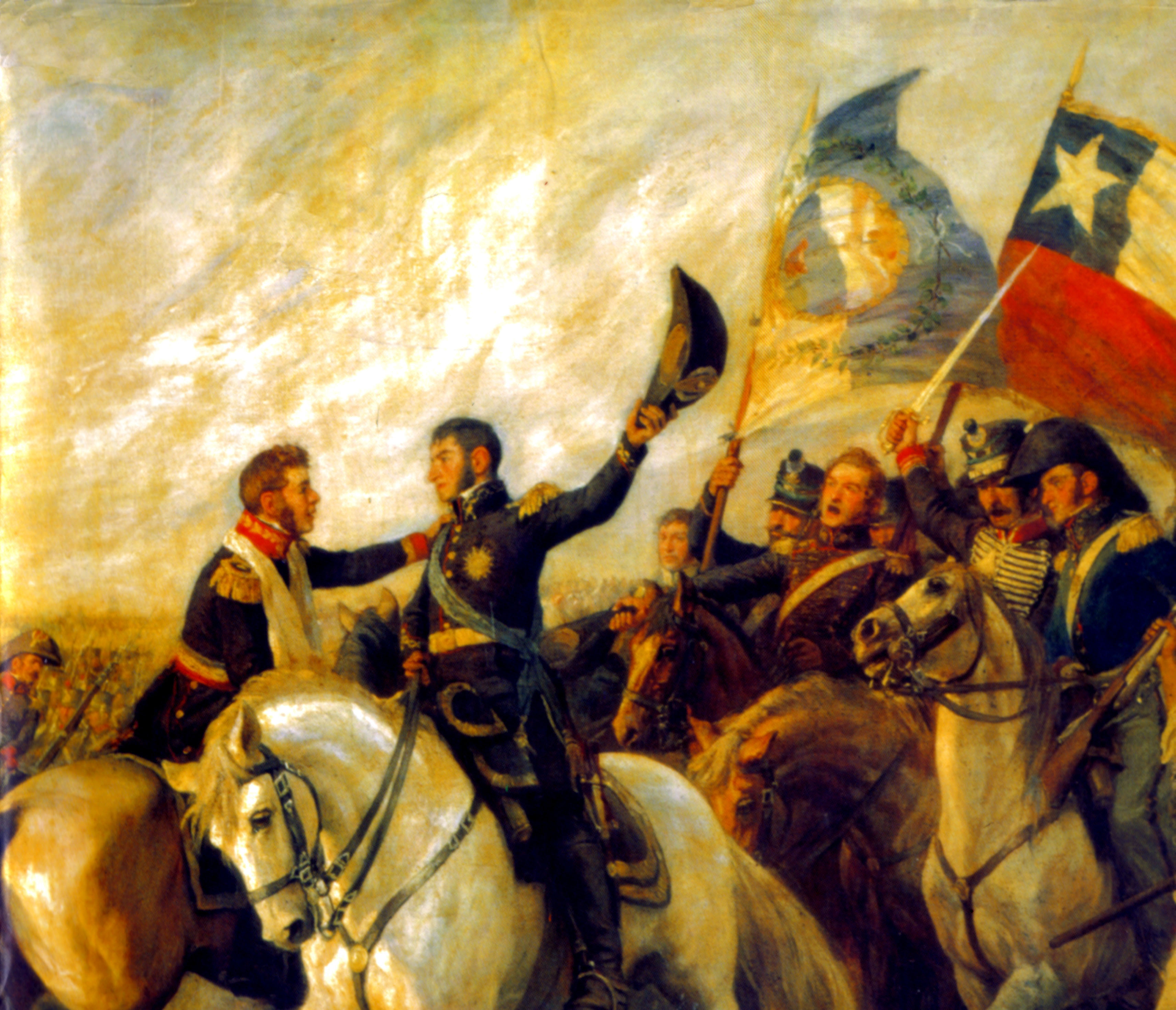
The Embrace of Maipú (1908)

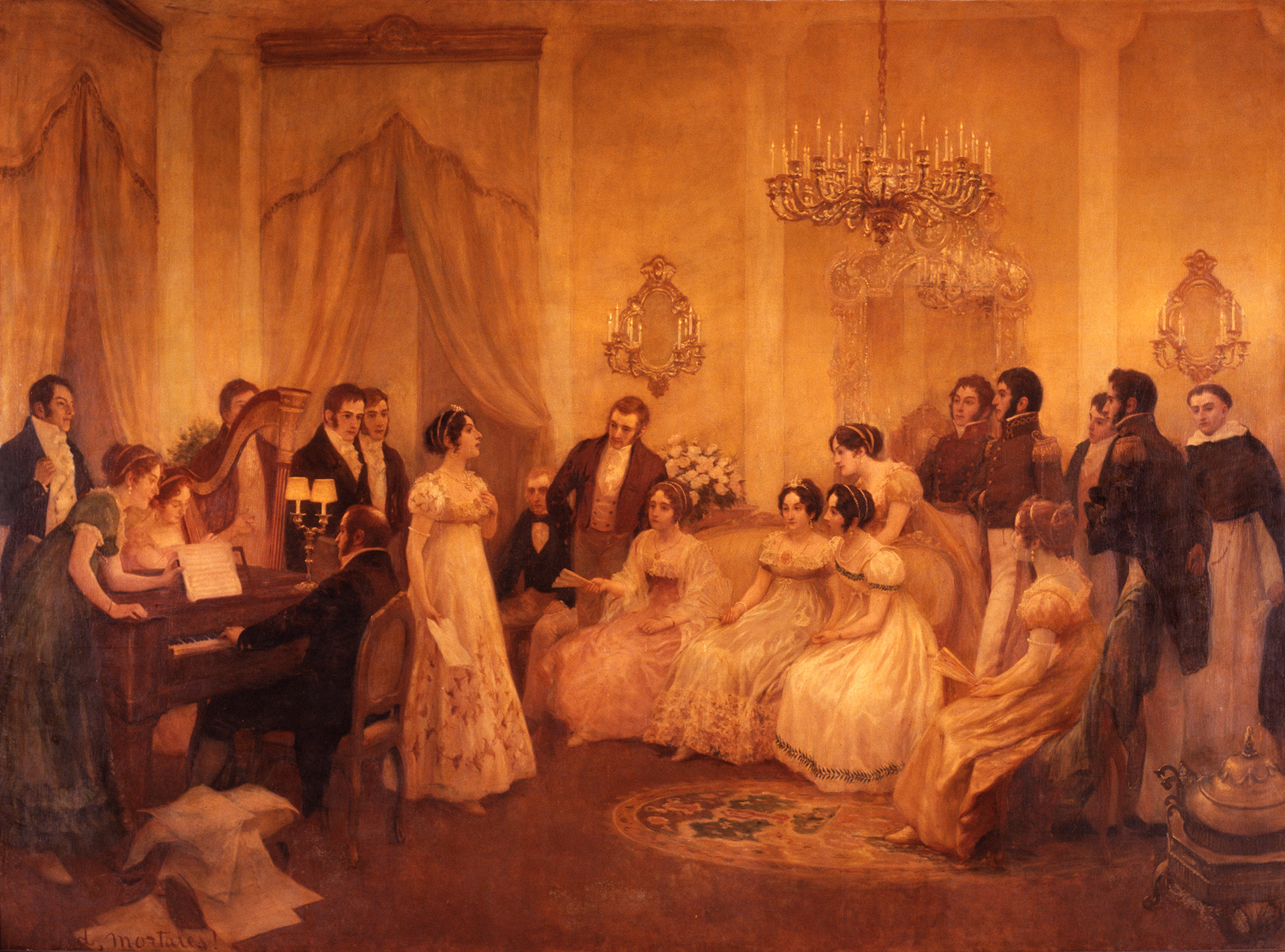
The Argentine National Anthem is performed for the first time (1910)

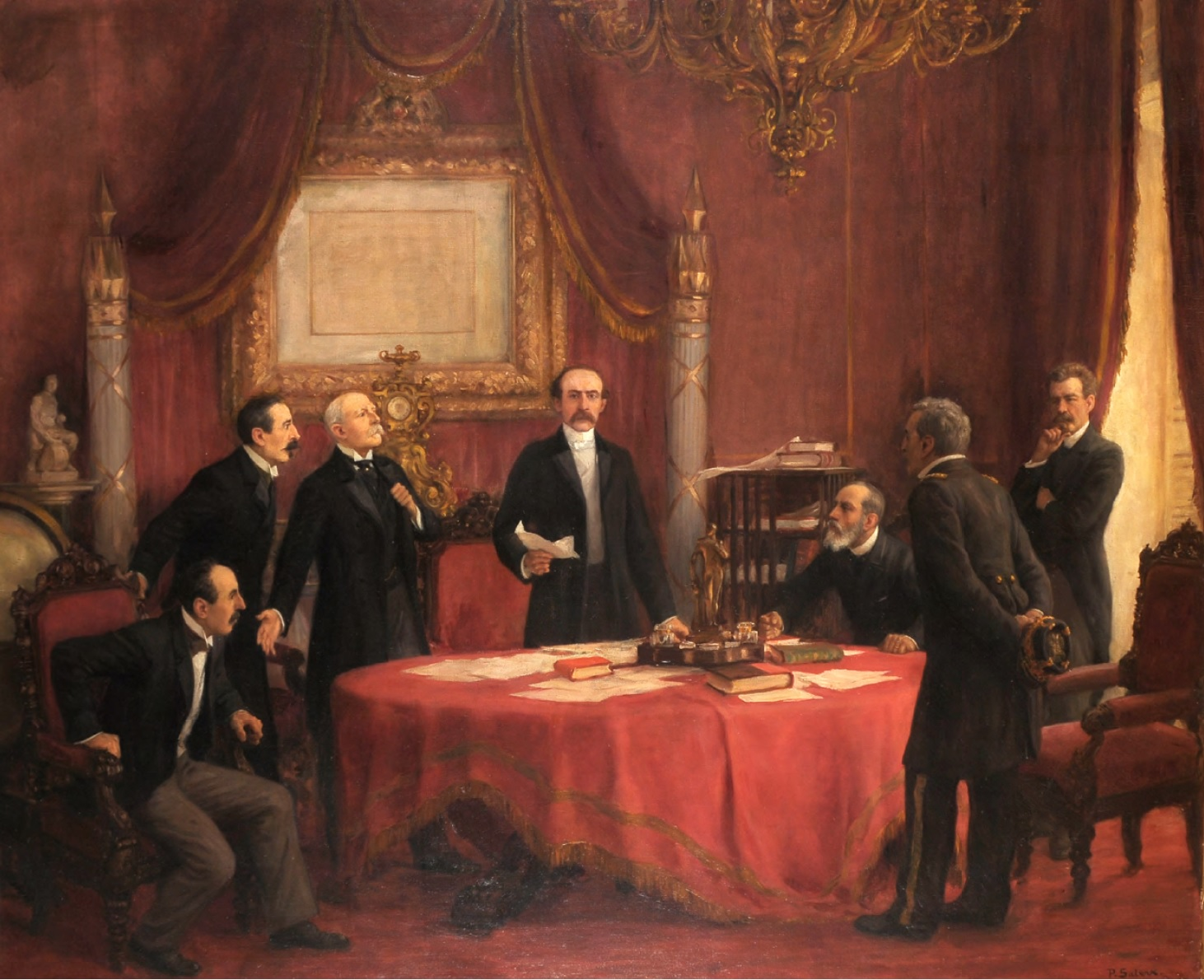
Balmaceda and his ministers (1910)

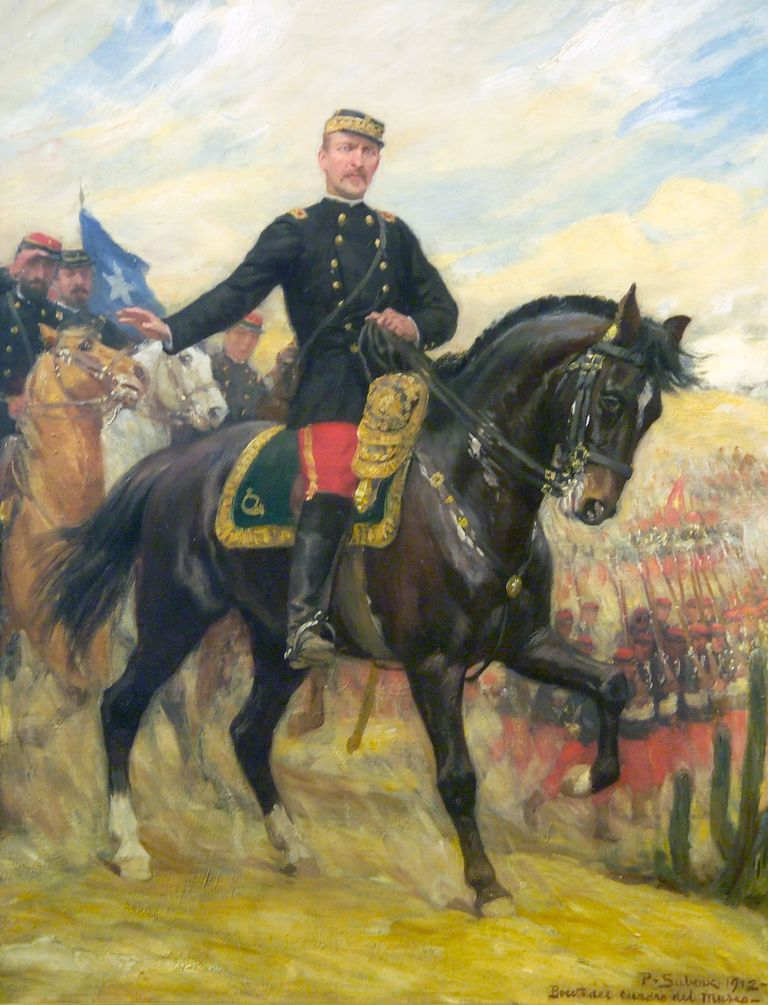
General Baquedano (1912)

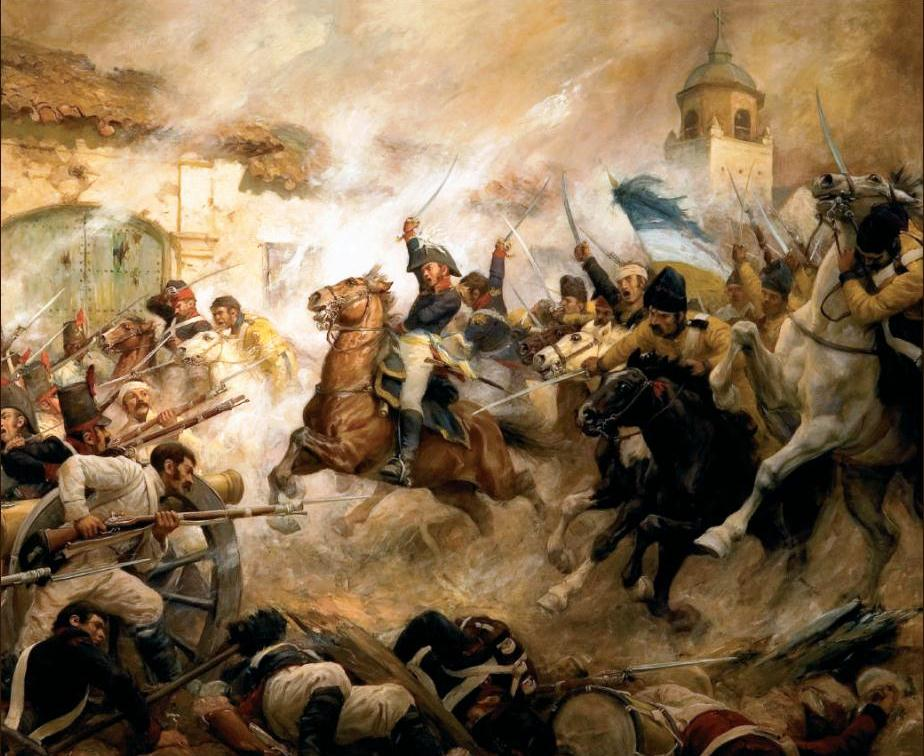
O'Higgins' Charge at the Battle of Rancagua (1938)

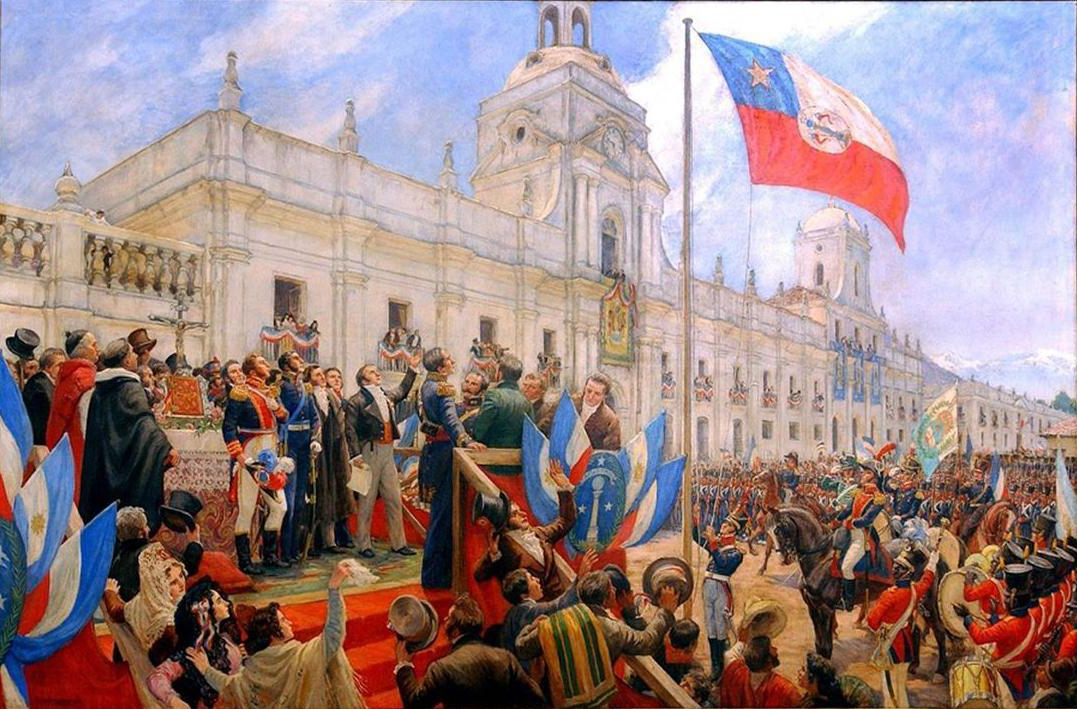
Proclamation of the Chilean Declaration of Independence (1945)

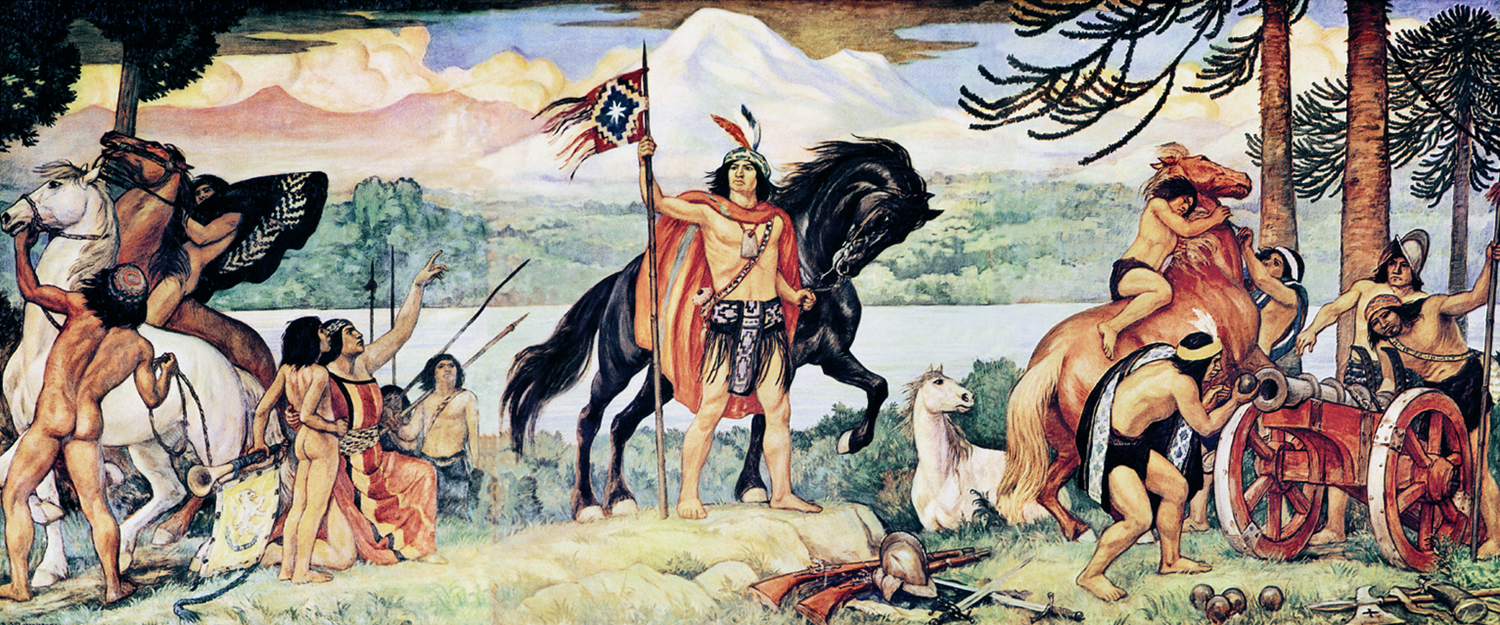
The young Lautaro (1946)

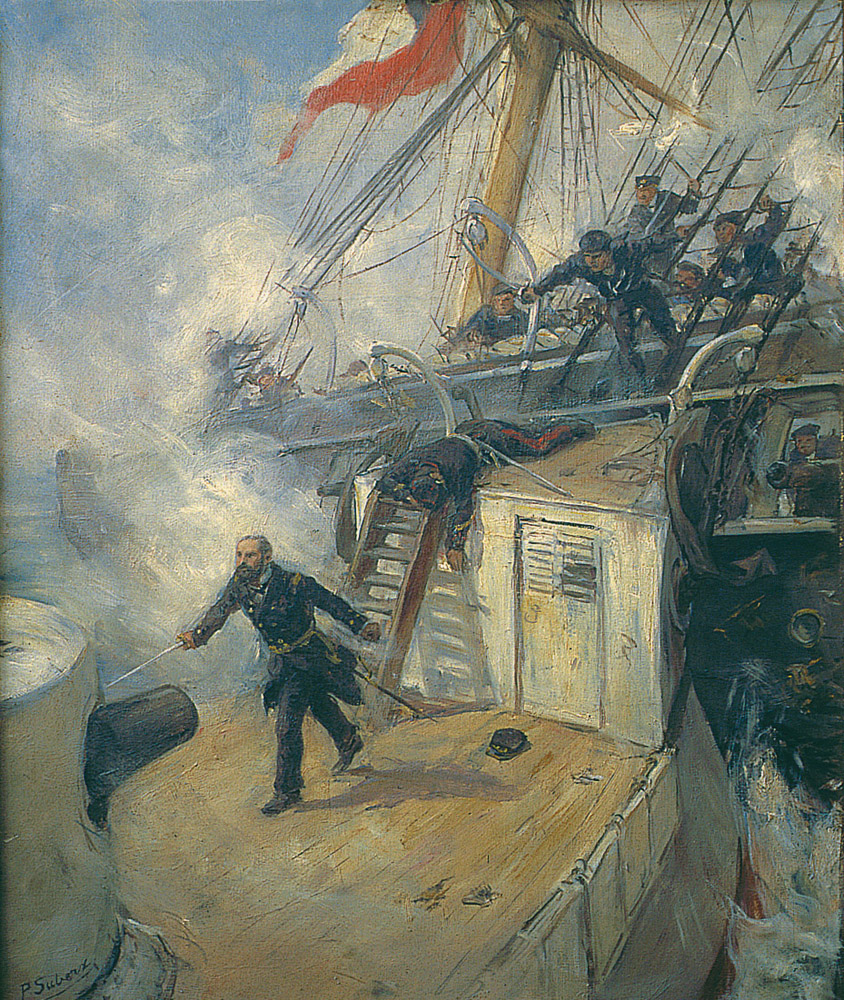
Approach of Arturo Prat (Date unknonwn)
