= Ramón Subercaseaux Vicuña =

Chilean painter, politician and diplomat (1854–1937)

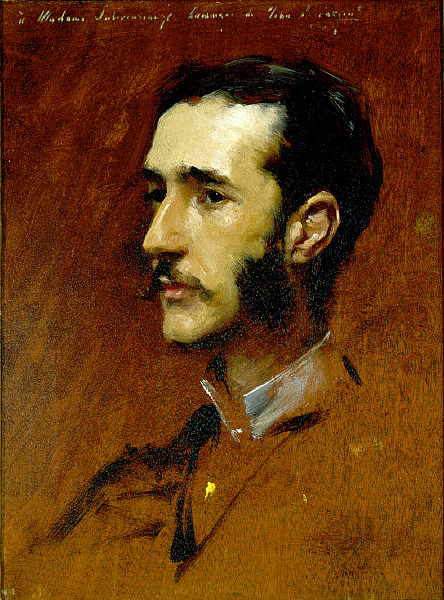
- John Singer Sargent (c. 1880) Ramon Subercaseaux

Ambassador of Chile to the Holy See
- In office 1924–1930
- Preceded by: Horacio Fernández
- Succeeded by: Ricardo Ahumada

Personal details
- Born: 10 April 1854 Valparaíso, Chile
- Died: 19 January 1937 (aged 82) Viña del Mar, Chile
- Spouse: Amalia Errázuriz de Subercaseaux (m. 1879; died 1930)
- Children: 6, including Pedro Subercaseaux; Luis Subercaseaux; Blanca Subercaseaux de Valdés; Juan Subercaseaux
- Relatives: Francisco Valdés Subercaseaux (grandson); Gabriel Valdés (grandson); Juan Gabriel (great-grandson); Maximiano Errázuriz Valdivieso (father-in-law); José Tomás Errázuriz (brother-in-law); Francisco Ramón Vicuña (grandfather)
- Education: University of Chile, 1874
- Occupation: Politician; diplomat; painter
- Awards: Order of the Crown 1st Class; Order of the Crown of Italy

Ramón Subercaseaux Vicuña (10 April 1854 – 19 January 1937) was a Chilean politician, diplomat and painter.

== Biography ==
Roman Daniel Manuel Del Carmen Subercaseaux Vicuña was born on 10 April 1854 in Valparaíso to Ramón Subercaseaux Mercado, a businessperson and politician, and Magdalena Vicuña Aguirre. Through his father Subercaseaux was a member of the Subercaseaux family, and was the grandson of Francisco Subercaseaux Breton. Through his mother Subercaseaux was the grandson of Francisco Ramón Vicuña. Subercaseaux was one of fourteen children.

He studied at the Colegio San Ignacio from 1854 to 1859, and at the Instituto Nacional. From 1871 to 1874, he read law at the University of Chile. During this period, he also took private art lessons from the German-born painter Ernesto Kirchbach, second Director of the Academia de Pintura in Santiago. He finally decided to give up law and became largely self-taught in drawing and oil painting. That same year, he went to Rome where he took classes from the Spanish painter, José García Ramos. In 1879, Subercaseaux was elected to the Chilean Congress as an Alternate Deputy for Angol, representing the Conservative Party. In 1882, after finishing his term in Congress, he became the Chilean consul in Paris.

== Diplomatic career ==
In 1897, he went back to Europe; this time as a full-fledged diplomat. He served in Italy and Germany, where Kaiser Wilhelm II's support for Chile was instrumental in preventing war with Argentina. During this time, he also began to write. He returned to Chile in 1903 and, three years later, was elected a Senator, representing Arauco Province, serving until 1912. He was appointed Minister of Foreign Affairs by Juan Luis Sanfuentes in 1915, and held that office for a year.

After serving as President of the Catholic University's extension school, and several commissions, he returned to diplomatic work in 1924 when he became Chile's Ambassador to the Holy See. He served in that position for six years. His term was notable for the fact that, during his tenure, the Chilean Congress enacted the Constitution of 1925, which established the separation of church and state, yet relations with Pope Pius XI remained cordial.

Over the course of his diplomatic career, he was awarded the Prussian Order of the Crown, First Class and the Order of the Crown of Italy, Grand Cross.

== Personal life ==
In 1879, Subercaseaux married Amalia Errázuriz de Subercaseaux (née Errázuriz Urmeneta), a writer and co-founder of the Chilean Ladies League. Subercaseaux was the son-in-law of Maximiano Errázuriz Valdivieso and the brother-in-law of José Tomás Errázuriz, Eugenia Errázuriz and Rafael Errázuriz Urmeneta. Subercaseaux and Errázuriz had ten (Note: Also cited as six.) children including:

- Pedro Subercaseaux (1880 – 1956), painter and Benedictine monk; married Elvira Lyon Otaégui (Note: Later annulled by the Pope so that both could join religious orders)
- Luis Subercaseaux (1882 – 1973), diplomat and athlete
- Blanca Subercaseaux de Valdés (1880s – 1965), a writer and artist; married Horacio Valdés Ortúzar, an engineer
- Juan Subercaseaux (1896 – 1942), the Archbishop of La Serena.

In 1906, Subercaseaux's daughter Maria died aged 13. Through his daughter Blanca, Subercaseaux was the grandfather of Francisco Valdés Subercaseaux, a Franciscan friar and Prelate, and Gabriel Valdés, a politician, lawyer and diplomat.

== Selected writings ==
- Memorias de 50 años, Imprenta y litografía Barcelona, Santiago, 1908 Online @ Google books.
- Memorias de ochenta años: recuerdos personales, críticas, remiscencias históricas, viajes, anécdotas, 2 vols. Nascimento, 1936
- El genio de Roma; el Lacio y la campiña romana, héroes y poetas, los papas, Unione Editrice, Rome, 1911

== Gallery ==
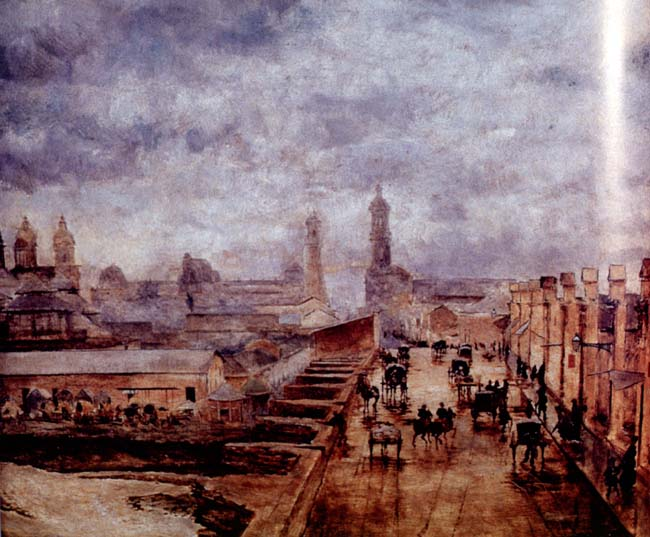
Ramón Subercaseaux Vicuña (1875) "An Old Masonry Bridge"

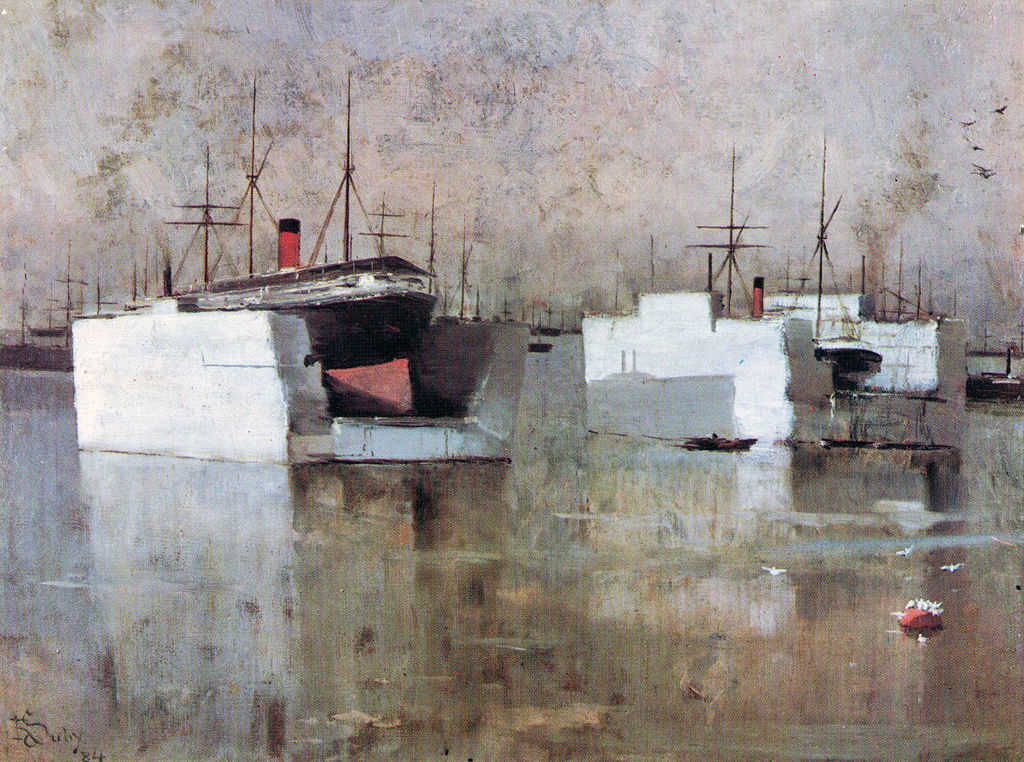
Ramón Subercaseaux Vicuña (1884) "The Dikes of Valparaíso"

== See also ==
- Subercaseaux family
- A Portrait of the Daughters of Ramón Subercaseaux
