= Rafael Errázuriz Urmeneta =

Chilean politician and diplomat

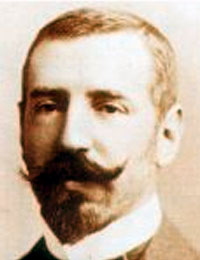
- Errázuriz in 1899
- Born: 10 August 1861; Santiago, Chile
- Died: 26 December 1923 (aged 62); Rome, Kingdom of Italy
- Spouse: Elvira Valdés Ortúzar (m. 1889)
- Children: 5
- Father: Maximiano Errázuriz Valdivieso
- Relatives: José Tomás Errázuriz (brother); Amalia Errázuriz de Subercaseaux (sister); Ramón Subercaseaux Vicuña (brother-in-law); Pedro Subercaseaux (nephew); Luis Subercaseaux (nephew); Blanca Subercaseaux de Valdés (niece); Juan Subercaseaux (nephew); Federico Errázuriz Zañartu (uncle); Eulogia Echaurren (aunt); Carmen Quiroga de Urmeneta (grandmother)
- Family: Errázuriz family

Rafael Valentín Errázuriz Urmeneta (10 August 1861 – 26 December 1923) was a Chilean politician, diplomat, lawyer, farmer and entrepreneur.

== Biography ==
Errázuriz was born on 10 August 1861 in Santiago, to Maximiano Errázuriz Valdivieso a surveyor, politician and winemaker, and Josefa Amalia Urmeneta de Errázuriz (née Urmeneta Quiroga), who died during his birth. Through his father Errázuriz was a member of the Errázuriz family, and was the grandson of the military officer and politician Francisco Javier Errázuriz Aldunate, and the nephew of Federico Errázuriz Zañartu and Eulogia Echaurren. Through his mother Errázuriz was the grandson of José Tomás Urmeneta and Carmen Quiroga de Urmeneta. The youngest of five siblings, Errázuriz was the brother of José Tomás Errázuriz, a painter and diplomat, and Amalia Errázuriz de Subercaseaux, a writer.

Errázuriz completed his secondary studies at the Instituto Nacional, and later at the Universidad de Chile where he studied law. He was admitted to the bar on August 12, 1881. He joined the Conservative party very young; and on October 10, 1889, Errázuriz married Elvira Valdés Ortúzar, and together they had 6 children.

Errázuriz came from a well-known winemaking family. Later he took over Panquehue Errázuriz, the family's wine estate. Errázuriz was elected deputy several times, first for Ovalle (period 1888–1891), then for Illapel, Ovalle and Combarbalá (period 1891–1894) and for Lebu, Cañete and Arauco (period 1894–1897 and 1897–1900). He also served as a senator for Aconcagua between 1897 and 1906. President Federico Errázuriz Echaurren appointed him Ministers of Foreign Affairs, Cult and Colonization (1899–1900) and President Germán Riesco appointed him Minister of the Interior (1904).

In 1907, Errázuriz was named Ambassador to the Holy See, a position he held until 1921. He died in the city of Rome in 1923.

Political offices
Preceded by Federico Puga	Minister of Foreign Affairs, Cult and Colonization; 1899	Succeeded by Manuel Salinas
Preceded by Arturo Besa	Minister of the Interior; 1904	Succeeded by Manuel Egidio Ballesteros

== See also ==
- Pedro Nolasco Cruz Vergara
