= Eugenia Errázuriz =

Chilean designer

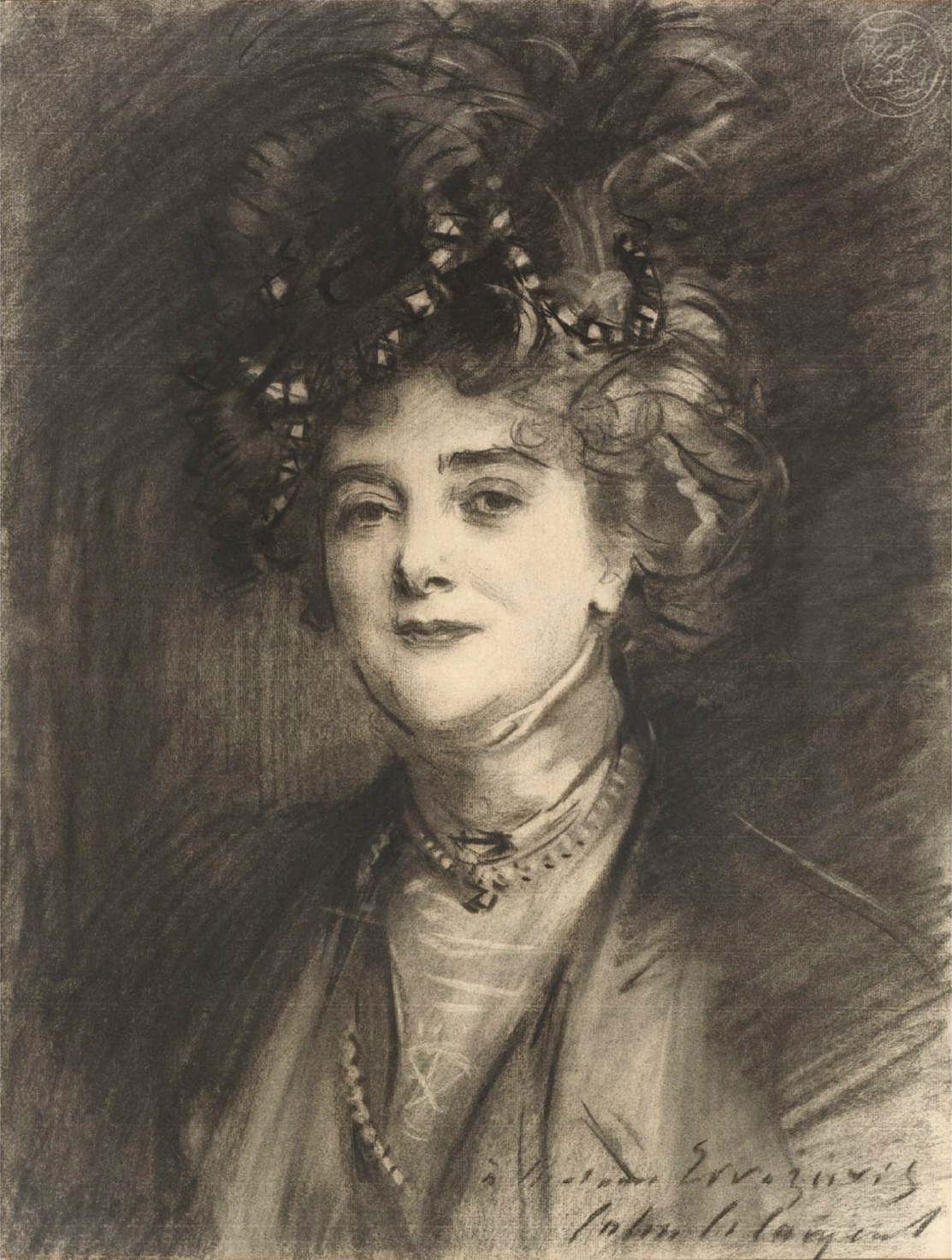
- Drawing of Errázuriz by John Singer Sargent, c. 1905
- Born: Eugenia Huici Arguedas; 15 September 1860; Bolivia
- Died: 1951 (aged 90–91); Santiago, Chile
- Spouse: José Tomás Errázuriz
- Family: Errázuriz family

Eugenia Huici Arguedas de Errázuriz (15 September 1860 – 1951) was a Chilean patron of modernism and a style leader of Paris from 1880 into the 20th century. Her spare taste as an interior designer was influential.

Her circle of friends and protégés included Pablo Picasso, Igor Stravinsky, Jean Cocteau, and the poet Blaise Cendrars. She was of Basque descent, as was her husband's Errázuriz family originating in Aranaz, Navarre.

== Early life and background ==
Eugenia Huici was born in Bolivia in 1860. She was one of 13 children of Ildefonso Huici y Peón, a Chilean silver magnate who fled civil war and moved his family to an estate in La Calera, Chile on the banks of the Aconcagua river, then a village some 60 kilometres (37 mi) northeast of Valparaíso; Her mother Manuela Arguedas was Bolivian.

Eugenia's education was in an English convent in Valparaiso. She was noted from an early age for her beauty.

== Marriage and Paris ==
Eugenia married José Tomás Errázuriz, a young and wealthy landscape painter from a well-known winemaking family. Her first years of marriage were spent at Panquehue Errázuriz, the family's wine estate, where she had a son who died soon after birth; the couple eventually had three surviving children: Maximiliano, Carmen, and María. She convinced her husband to move to Paris in 1882, where his brother-in-law Ramón Subercaseaux Vicuña was the Chilean consul. He was married to Amalia Errázuriz, a beauty who had been painted by John Singer Sargent.

The couple settled in Paris, where Eugenia attracted a prominent following, including friends in the circle of the Subercaseauxes: the American heiress Winnaretta Singer; the composer Gabriel Fauré; French painters Joseph-Roger Jourdain, Ernest Duez, and Paul Helleu; and the Italian artist Giovanni Boldini.

Eugenia was a patron of the arts and she supported both Stravinsky and Diaghilev at one point. She establishing friendships with creative figures such as Walter Sickert, Baron Adolph de Meyer, Jean Cocteau and Cecil Beaton. A particular friend was Delfina Edwards Bello, the Chilean wife of Bernard Boutet de Monvel.

=== Portraits ===
In the autumn of 1882, the couple met John Singer Sargent in Venice: José's brother had taken a studio with Sargent at the Palazzo Rezzonico. Described as an extraordinary beauty, with a beaked nose and raven hair, she was painted by Sargent, who had previously painted Madame Subercaseaux in 1880). Sargent went on to paint her several more times. She was also painted by Jacques-Emile Blanche, Giovanni Boldini, Paul Helleu, Augustus John, Ambrose McEvoy and Pablo Picasso.

== London ==
Around 1900, the Errázurizes moved to Chelsea, London, and lived in Cheyne Walk. José Tomás Errázuriz fell sick with tuberculosis and spent much time in Switzerland; the couple became estranged before he died in 1927.

== Second period in France ==
In 1913, Errázuriz returned to France. She moved to Biarritz. She associated with her nephew, Antonio de Gandarillas, known as Tony, and his companion, the painter Christopher Wood. Tony and Eugenia also became friends of Sergei Diaghilev and of Artur Rubinstein.

Pablo Picasso adored Errázuriz, when she took the place left by Gertrude Stein in 1915 when the latter left Paris to drive an ambulance (she became known as "Picasso's Other Mother") In the summer of 1918, he and his new wife, Olga Khokhlova, spent their honeymoon in her villa "Mimoseraie" near Biarritz. It was there that Picasso met the gallerist Paul Rosenberg.

Le Corbusier was commissioned c.1930 to design her a beach house in Viña del Mar, Chile, but it was never built. The house, with a thatched roof, was eventually built in Japan by a Le Corbusier pupil for another client.

Late in life, Errázuriz became a Franciscan tertiary. A lay nun, she wore a plain black habit designed by Coco Chanel.

== Later life and death ==
The end of the life of Eugenia Errázuriz was troubled, and some details are unclear. Christopher Wood believed she had lost heavily in the crash of 1929. She was unworldly, spent her capital, and by the mid-1930s had come to depend on money from Patricia López-Wilshaw, her great-niece. Picasso also found ways to support her. When in Paris she resided in part of the house of the librettist Étienne de Beaumont, in rue Masseran (fr:Rue Masseran) but eventually had to give that up. By 1941 she was selling the contents of her apartment. In 1942, her son Maximiliano died: he had been returning money to his mother from Chile.

Eugenia Errázuriz returned to Chile, at some point in the period 1947 to 1950. She died in Santiago. In one account, it was in 1951, hit by a car while crossing a street at the age of 91.

== Taste ==
Eugenia Errázuriz played hostess to artists and writers at her villa in Biarritz, "La Mimoseraie". Jean Cocteau introduced Blaise Cendrars to her. Around 1918 he visited and, taken with the simplicity of the décor, was inspired to write the sequence of poems D'Oultremer à Indigo (From Ultramarine to Indigo). He stayed in a room decorated with murals by Picasso.

At "La Mimoseraie" Errázuriz elevated simplicity to an art form. In 1910, wrote Richardson,

...she already stood out for the unconventional sparseness of her rooms, for her disdain of poufs and potted palms and too much passementerie.... She appreciated things that were very fine and simple, above all, things made of linen, cotton, deal, or stone, whose quality improved with laundering or fading, scrubbing or polishing. She attended to the smallest detail in her house".

Errázuriz favoured the colour she called "Inca pink", adopted by Elsa Schiaparelli as shocking pink. Cecil Beaton noted red-tile floors that were "carpetless but spotlessly clean." He also wrote of her in The Glass of Fashion:

Her effect on the taste of the last fifty years has been so enormous that the whole aesthetic of modern interior decoration, and many of the concepts of simplicity...generally acknowledged today, can be laid at her remarkable doorstep.

She banned matched suites of furniture, potted palms and clutter. She hung in 1914 curtains of unlined linen, and whitewashed the walls like a peasant's home. She ordered: "Throw out and keep throwing out! Elegance means elimination." "A house that does not alter," she liked to say, "is a dead house." "If the kitchen is not as well kept as the salon ... you cannot have a beautiful house," she declared.

The designer Jean-Michel Frank was her leading disciple from the 1920s, mixing the Louis XVI style with modern fittings.

== Collector ==
Errázuriz collected works by Auguste Rodin and Tarsila do Amaral. Her Paris apartment in the Avenue Montaigne had on its living room walls two Picassos.

== Gallery ==
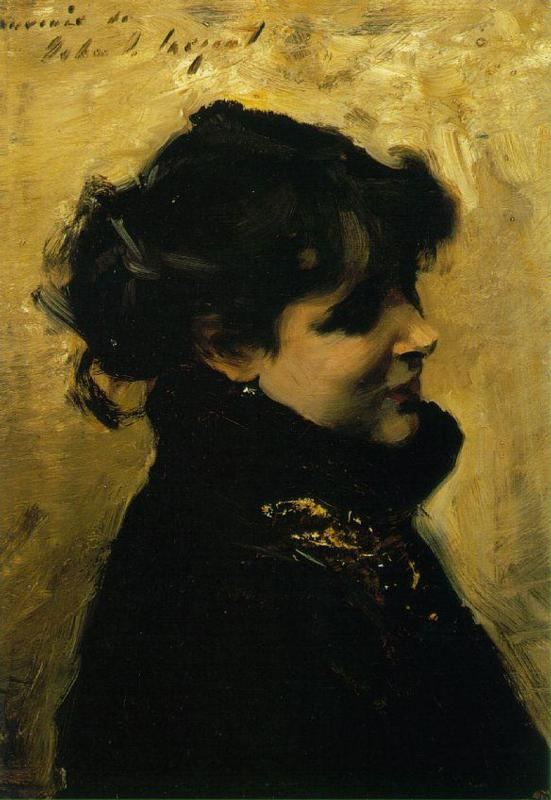
John Singer Sargent (c. 1880–1882) "Madame Errazuriz"

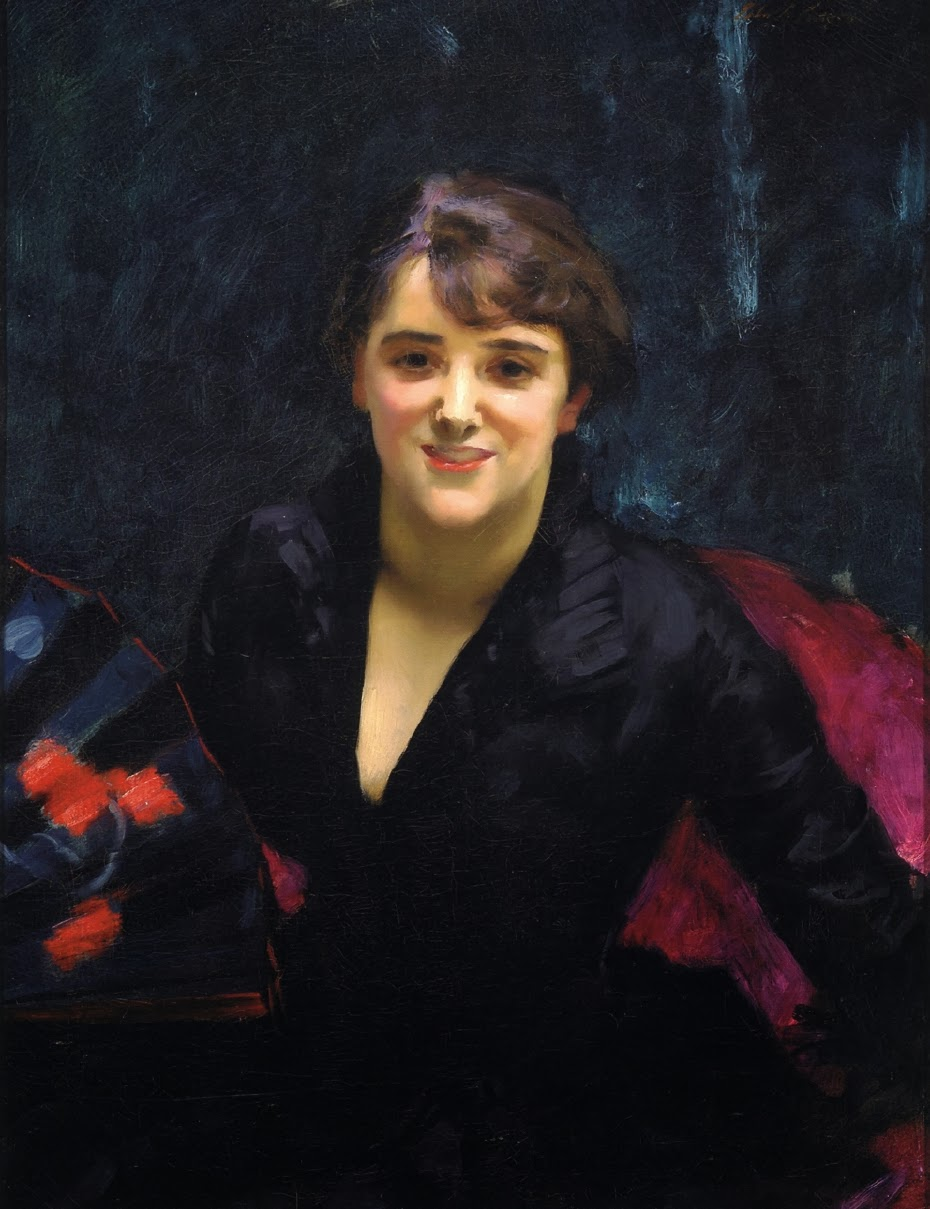
John Singer Sargent (c. 1882–1883) Madame Errazuriz or The Lady in Black

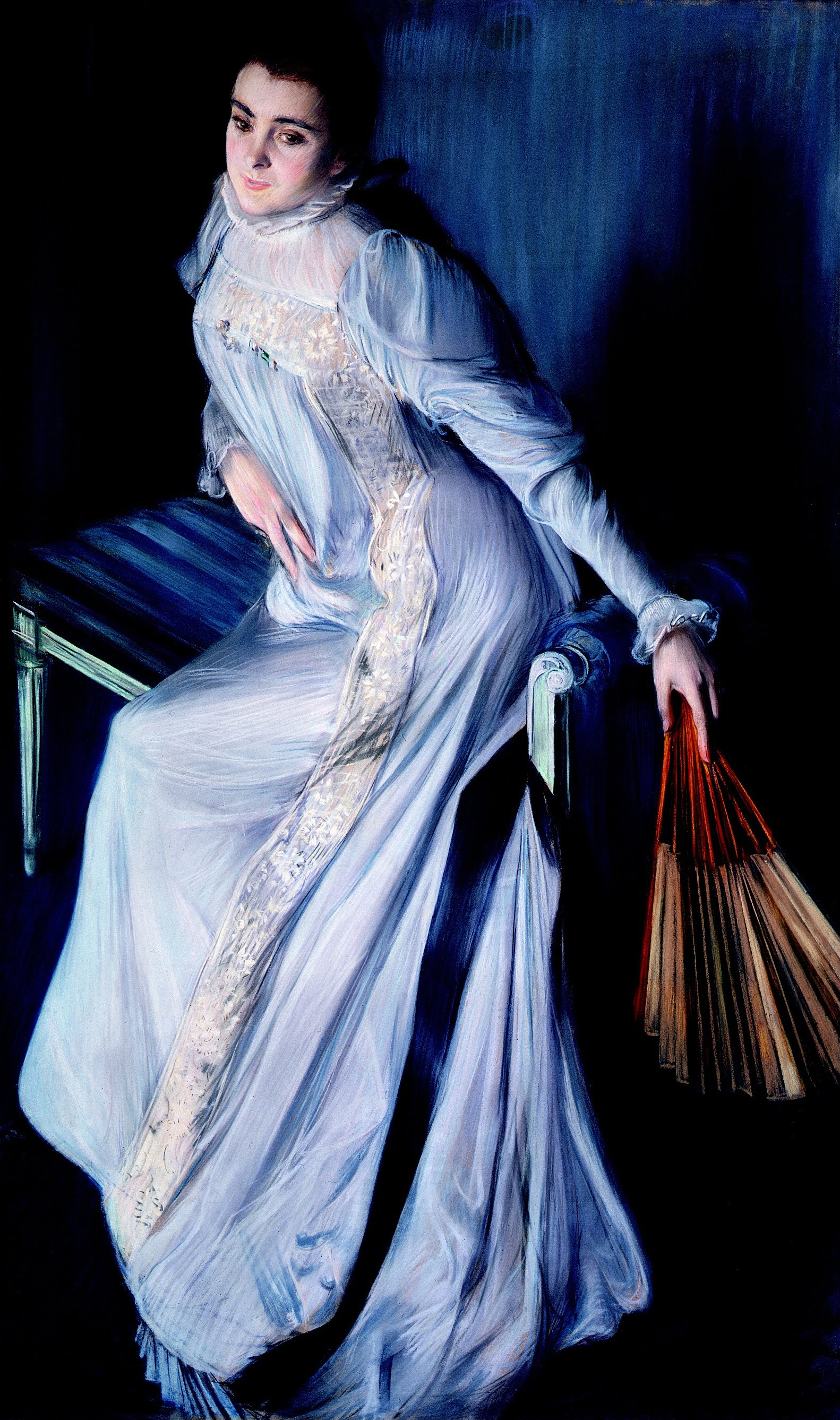
Jacques-Emile Blanche (1890) Portrait of Eugenia Huici Arguedas de Errazuriz, Dixon Gallery and Gardens
