= Carmen Quiroga de Urmeneta =

Chilean philanthropist (1812–1897)

- Born: Carmen Quiroga Darrigrande; 18 September 1812; San Juan de la Puntilla, Monte Patria, Captaincy General of Chile, Spanish Empire
- Died: 4 December 1897 (aged 85); Recoleta, Santiago, Chile
- Spouse: José Tomás Urmeneta García (m. 1831; died 1878)
- Children: 3
- Relatives: Maximiano Errázuriz Valdivieso (son-in-law); José Tomás Errázuriz (grandson); Amalia Errázuriz de Subercaseaux (granddaughter); Rafael Errázuriz Urmeneta (grandson)

Carmen Quiroga de Urmeneta (née Quiroga Darrigrande; 12 September 1812 – 4 December 1897) was a Chilean philanthropist.

== Biography ==
Carmen Quiroga Darrigrande was born on 18 September 1812 in San Juan de la Puntilla, Monte Patria to Juan Bautista de Quiroga and Antonia Darrigrande.

As president of various religious and aid societies, Quiroga contributed to the founding of churches and homes for the poor.

Following the death of her husband in 1878, Quiroga had a hospital built in Limache in his memory. The subsequent hospital, the Hospital Santo Tomás de Limache, was donated by Quiroga to the Ecclesiastical Authority of Santiago and was officially opened in January 1887.

== Personal life ==
In 1831, Quiroga married José Tomás Urmeneta García, a businessperson, politician, collector, and philanthropist. Quiroga and Urmeneta had three daughters.

Through her daughter Josefa Amalia Urmeneta de Errázuriz (née Urmeneta Quiroga), Quiroga was the mother-in-law of Maximiano Errázuriz Valdivieso and was the grandmother of José Tomás Errázuriz, Amalia Errázuriz de Subercaseaux and Rafael Errázuriz Urmeneta.

Quiroga died on 4 December 1897 in Recoleta, Santiago.
