= Amalia Errázuriz de Subercaseaux =

Chilean writer (1860–1930)

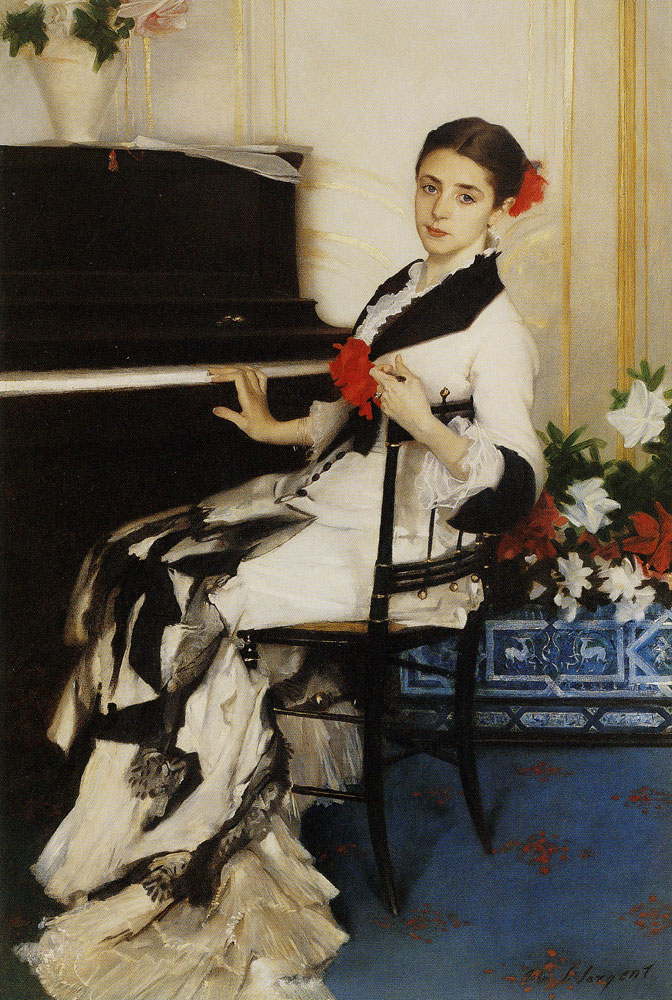
- John Singer Sargent (c. 1880-1881) Portrait de Madame Ramón Subercaseaux
- Born: Amalia Errázuriz Urmeneta; 31 May 1860; Guayacán, Coquimbo, Chile
- Died: 8 March 1930 (aged 69); Barcelona, Spain
- Spouse: Ramón Subercaseaux Vicuña (m. 1879)
- Children: 10, including Pedro Subercaseaux; Luis Subercaseaux; Blanca Subercaseaux de Valdés; Juan Subercaseaux
- Father: Maximiano Errázuriz Valdivieso
- Relatives: Francisco Valdés Subercaseaux (grandson); Gabriel Valdés (grandson); José Tomás Errázuriz (brother); Rafael Errázuriz Urmeneta (brother); Federico Errázuriz Zañartu (uncle); Eulogia Echaurren (aunt); Carmen Quiroga de Urmeneta (grandmother)
- Family: Errázuriz family Subercaseaux family
- Writing career
- Language: Spanish

Amalia Errázuriz de Subercaseaux (née Errázuriz Urmeneta; 1860–1930) was a Chilean writer of Catholic devotional literature and was one of Chile's first travel writers. In 1912, Errázuriz co-founded and the Chilean Ladies League with Adela Edwards Salas.

== Early life and education ==
Amalia Errázuriz Urmeneta was born on 31 May 1860 in the Guayacán neighborhood of Coquimbo to Maximiano Errázuriz Valdivieso, a surveyor, politician and winemaker, and Josefa Amalia Urmeneta de Errázuriz (née Urmeneta Quiroga). Through her father Errázuriz was a member of the Errázuriz family, and was the granddaughter of the military officer and politician Francisco Javier Errázuriz Aldunate, and the niece of Federico Errázuriz Zañartu and Eulogia Echaurren. Through her mother Errázuriz was the granddaughter of José Tomás Urmeneta and Carmen Quiroga de Urmeneta. One of five siblings, Errázuriz was the younger sister of José Tomás Errázuriz.

In 1861, Errázuriz's mother died whilst giving birth to her younger brother Rafael Errázuriz Urmeneta, a politician and diplomat. Following her mother's death Errázuriz was primarily raised by her paternal grandmother. From the age of 10 Errázuriz was educated at Maestranza, a convent boarding school run by the Society of the Sacred Heart. Errázuriz was a student of Ana de Rousier, and had intentions of becoming a Carmelite.

In 1871, Errázuriz accompanied her father, her step-mother Carmen Valdés Ureta, and siblings on a business tour to Europe. On the tour Errázuriz learnt English and French from a governess.

== Career ==
In 1879, aged 18, Errázuriz married Ramón Subercaseaux Vicuña, a painter, politician and diplomat. The same year Subercaseaux was appointed as the Chilean Minister to Germany and Italy, and the couple moved to Europe. In the early 1880s Errázuriz was painted by John Singer Sargent in the Portrait de Madame Ramón Subercaseaux.

In the 1890s Errázuriz's family settled in Paris. Errázuriz first visited the Middle East in December 1893, and again the following year alongside her older children. Errázuriz's travel diaries from these visits were later published (Note: Without a date.) as the Mis días de peregrinación en Oriente around 1930. Errázuriz's family later left Patis and briefly returned to Chile, before settling in Berlin from 1898 to 1903.

=== Return to Chile ===
Upon returning to Chile the family lived at the Urmeneta Palace in Santiago. In 1906, the family moved to the Quinta de El Llano estate in Southern Santiago.

In 1910, Errázuriz published her first book Roma del Alma which recounted her visit to the Vatican City. On 10 July 1912, Errázuriz co-founded the Chilean Ladies League alongside Adela Edwards Salas and became the organisation's first president. Errázuriz served as president until 1919.

In 1920, Errázuriz co-founded the Women's Institute of Higher and Practical Studies (Spanish: Instituto Femenino de Estudios Superiores y Prácticos) with Carlos Casanueva at the Pontifical Catholic University of Chile.

== Personal life ==
Errázuriz and Subercaseaux had ten (Note: Also cited as six.) children including:

- Pedro Subercaseaux (1880 – 1956), painter and Benedictine monk; married Elvira Lyon Otaégui (Note: Later annulled by the Pope so that both could join religious orders)
- Luis Subercaseaux (1882 – 1973), diplomat and athlete; married Margarita Donoso Foster
- Blanca Subercaseaux de Valdés (née Subercaseaux Errázuriz; 1880s – 1965), a writer and artist; married Horacio Valdés Ortúzar, an engineer
- Juan Subercaseaux (1896 – 1942), the Archbishop of La Serena.

In 1906, Errázuriz's daughter Maria died aged 13. Through her daughter Blanca, Errázuriz was the grandmother of Francisco Valdés Subercaseaux, a Franciscan friar and Prelate, and Gabriel Valdés, a politician, lawyer and diplomat.

On 8 March 1930 Errázuriz died in Barcelona, aged 69.

== Bibliography ==
- Errázuriz de Subercaseaux, Amalia (1909–1910). Roma del Alma (in Spanish). Rome, Italy: Imprimerie de l'Unione cooperativa editrice.
- Errázuriz de Subercaseaux, Amalia (1916). El ángel de la caridad : Doña Antonia Salas de Errázuriz : 1788 a 1867 (in Spanish). Santiago, Chile: Imprenta Chile.
- Errázuriz de Subercaseaux, Amalia (1927). Vida de la Virgen María contada a los niños (in Spanish).
- Errázuriz de Subercaseaux, Amalia (1930). Mis días de peregrinación en Oriente (in Spanish). Santiago, Chile.
- Errázuriz de Subercaseaux, Amalia (1931). Nuestra Santa Iglesia Católica (in Spanish).
- Errázuriz de Subercaseaux, Amalia. La bienaventurada Ana María Taigi: hija, esposa y madre ejemplar (in Spanish).

=== Unpublished ===
- Errázuriz Urmeneta, Amalia (1925). Cuaderno de familia (in Spanish). Santiago, Chile.
