= Maximiano Errázuriz =

Maximiano Errázuriz may refer to

- Maximiano Errázuriz Valdivieso (1832–1890), Chilean politician and winemaker
- Maximiano Errázuriz Valdés (1895–1950), Chilean diplomat and politician
- Maximiano Errázuriz Eguiguren (born 1945), Chilean politician
