= Chile–Holy See relations =

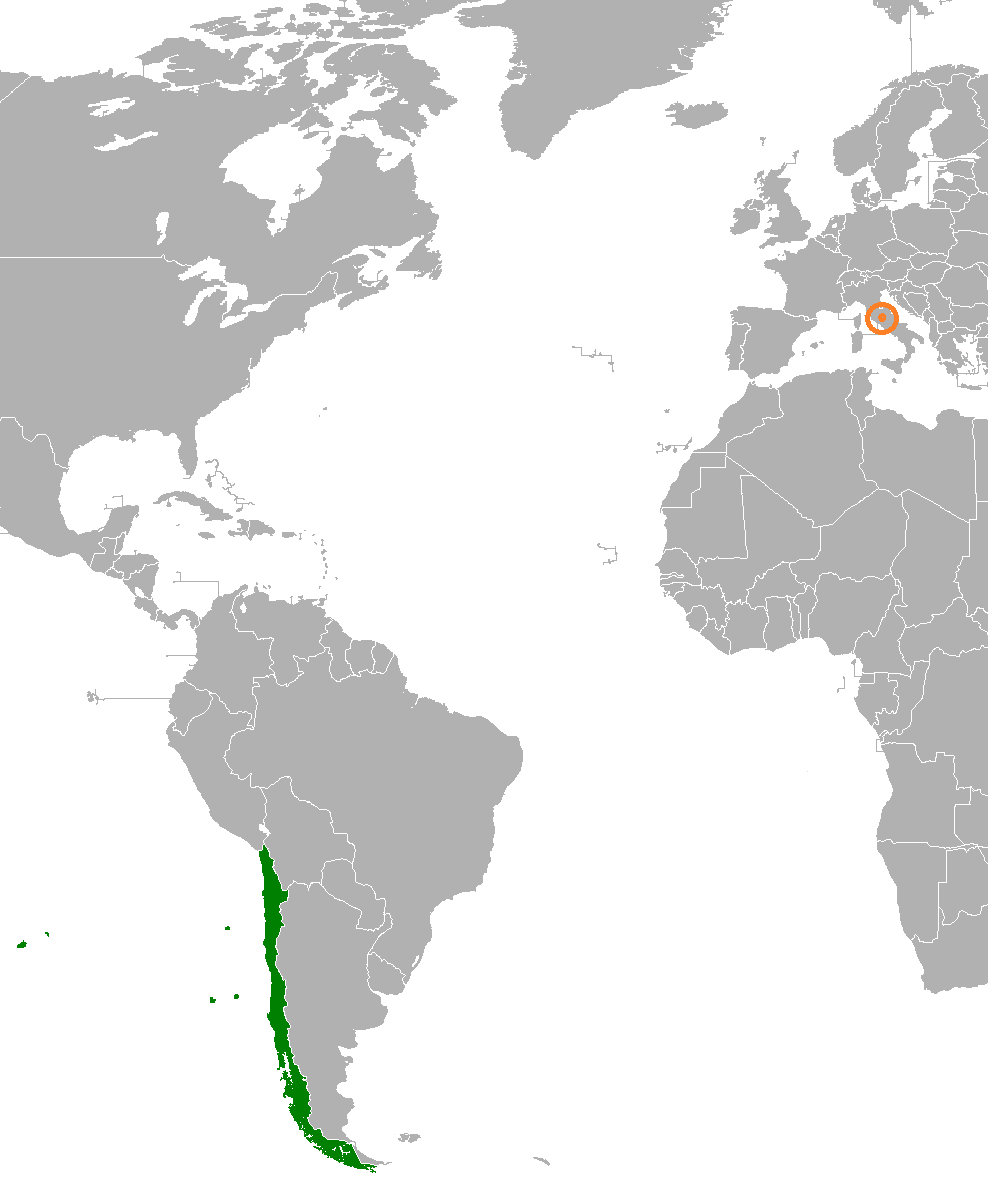
- Chile: Holy See

Chile–Holy See relations is the official relationship between Chile and the Vatican. The relationship is deemed to be very good and strong, as Chile is a majority Catholic country. The Vatican has an Apostolic nunciature in Santiago and Chile has an embassy in Rome.

== History and current state relations ==
With its background as a Christian country, Chile has an easier relationship with the Vatican. The two states established relations in the 1940s, and the Vatican still holds significant influence among Chileans.

Since the 21st century, Chile and the Holy See have increased their relations in religious cooperation, described as "excellent" by both Chile and the Holy See delegations.

Recently, the Holy See has played a role on urging Chilean authorities to investigate Chilean archbishops accused for nun and human abuses.

== See also ==
- Apostolic Nunciature to Chile
