= Aranaz =

Aranaz is a Spanish surname. Notable people with the surname include:

- Amalia Aranaz Murillo (born 1995), Spanish Female International Master of chess
- Eduardo Sáenz de Aranaz (1891–1958), Spanish military officer
- Francisco de Aranaz Darrás (1917–2010), Spanish antiquarian and cultural promoter
- Luis Aranaz (1914–1981), Spanish footballer and manager
- Manuel Aranaz Castellanos (1875–1925), Spanish writer born in Cuba
- María Antonina Sanjurjo Aranaz (1910–1939), Spanish athlete and pioneer of Galician sport
- Panchito Aranaz (1885–1944), Cuban actor, pianist, and comedy director
- Pedro Aranaz (1742–1821), Spanish composer
- Pilar Velasco Aranaz (1883–1940), Spanish professor and essayist
- Ricardo Aranaz (1852–1932), Spanish military officer and physicist

== See also ==
- Arantza, a town and municipality in Navarre, which is known as Aranaz in Spanish
