= Maximiano Errázuriz Valdivieso =

Chilean politician, industrialist and winemaker

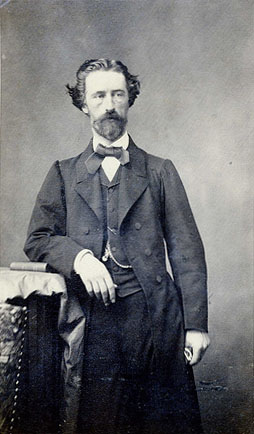
- Errázuriz during the 19th century

Personal details
- Born: 21 February 1832 Santiago, Chile
- Died: 17 November 1890 (aged 58)
- Spouse(s): Josefa Amalia Urmeneta Quiroga (m. 1855; died 1861) Carmen Valdés Ureta (m. 1871)
- Relations: Rafael Valentín Valdivieso (uncle); Crescente Errázuriz (brother); Federico Errázuriz Zañartu (half-brother)
- Children: 5, including José Tomás Errázuriz; Amalia Errázuriz de Subercaseaux; Rafael Errázuriz Urmeneta
- Education: University of Chile, 1851

Maximiano Errázuriz Valdivieso (21 February 1832 – 17 November 1890) was a Chilean politician, industrialist, surveyor and winemaker, known for founding the Viña Errázuriz winery.

== Early life and education ==
Errázuriz was born on 21 February 1832 in Santiago to Francisco Javier Errázuriz Aldunate, a military officer and politician, and Rosario Valdivieso Zañartu. Through his father Errázuriz was a member of the Errázuriz family, and was the grandson of the merchant and landowner Francisco Javier de Errázuriz Madariaga. Through his mother Errázuriz was the maternal nephew of Rafael Valentín Valdivieso. One of multiple siblings, Errázuriz was the older brother of Crescente Errázuriz and the younger half-brother of Federico Errázuriz Zañartu.

Errázuriz was educated at the Instituto Nacional General José Miguel Carrera, before studied engineering at the University of Chile. In 1851, Errázuriz graduated as a surveyor.

== Career ==
Errazuriz settled in Valparaíso, Chile, which at the time was one of the main ports of Chile and South America. There he met his future wife, Amalia Urmeneta Quiroga, daughter of José Tomás Urmeneta, who was the wealthiest man in the country. Maximiano and Amalia were married in 1855, when she was 18 and he was 22 years old.

Soon after the marriage, Maximiano Errázuriz entered into a partnership with his father-in-law to form a copper-producing company. Copper is one of Chile's most important natural resources, and at one time, their company accounted for one third of the world's total copper production. A year later, in 1856, Maximiano Errázuriz formed the Santiago Gas Company (Spanish: Compañía de Gas de Santiago), a company which was responsible for establishing street lighting in the capital city of Santiago.

A few years later, the couple moved to Guayacán, in the northern part of the country. There, Maximiano managed the mining company's production and business operations. But the move to Guayacán proved tragic. While pregnant with her fourth child, health problems forced Amalia to return to Santiago and live with her mother-in-law. She never recovered completely after the birth of their son Rafael. Amalia died in 1861, at the young age of 24.

After Amalia's death, Maximiano Errázuriz placed his children under the care of his mother and moved from the North back to Valparaíso to be near them and still manage his business. His family was concerned about his grief for his wife. To help him, they encouraged Maximiano to embark on a yearlong journey across Europe, where he was able to reinvigorate his interest in history and the arts.

=== Public office ===
Maximiano Errázuriz participated actively in Chile's public life. As a young man of 25, he served for the first time in the Chamber of Deputies. He was elected representative for three periods and subsequently Senator of the Republic for nine years. He also participated actively as a representative of the Chilean government on diplomatic tasks in the United States and in the United Kingdom. On one occasion, he showed his undying commitment to his country by backing Chilean government dealings with his own personal finances.

=== Winemaking activities ===
In 1870, again following the example of his father-in-law, he planted a vineyard on land he bought in Panquehue, a small town located North of Santiago in the Aconcagua Valley. Maximiano Errázuriz planted a total of 300 hectares in Panquehue. Later, his son Rafael increased the plantings to 700 hectares, with the Errazuriz vineyards becoming - based on the information of the time - the world's largest vineyard in the hands of a single owner.

== Later life ==
In 1871, Maximiano Errázuriz met Carmen Valdés, daughter of the governor of Valparaíso, whom he married. Shortly thereafter, he began construction of a large house in Panquehue. A beautiful park designed by French landscapers surrounded the house. This was to become the residence of the new couple. However, fate intervened. The candidates running for office for the presidential election of 1871 were very close to him: his older half-brother Federico Errázuriz Zañartu and his father-in-law José Tomás Urmeneta. He did not want his strong political influence to be used to affect the outcome of the election. To avoid being forced to take sides, he decided to leave the country. He traveled to Paris with his new wife and children. In the course of their subsequent return, Carmen became severely ill with yellow fever. She survived the trip only to die in Chile, close to her family.

Maximiano Errázuriz continued his activities and concentrated in his children's education. He decided to build a new house in Santiago, where he moved to distance himself from painful memories. This building, presently the Brazilian Embassy, is one of the most beautiful architectural designs in the capital city.

After the death of his former father-in-law and partner José Tomás Urmeneta in 1878, Maximiano Errázuriz formed a new partnership with his children and began a gradual retreat from the world of business, diplomacy and politics. In 1883, with his children already married, he settled permanently at his vineyard in Panquehue, selling his house in Santiago. He decided to live in the property's administration house, and never used the mansion he had built to share with his second wife. At 48, he completely transformed his life and became devoted to prayer and to aiding the poor. He lived austerely in the peacefulness of Panquehue, building houses for his workers, founding a school and a church. He also donated a significant portion of his art collection to charitable institutions. Maximiano Errázuriz died in 1890, at the age of 58.

== See also ==
- José Tomás Errázuriz
- Rafael Valentín Errázuriz
