= Luis Subercaseaux =

Chilean diplomat and athlete

Luis Subercaseaux Errázuriz
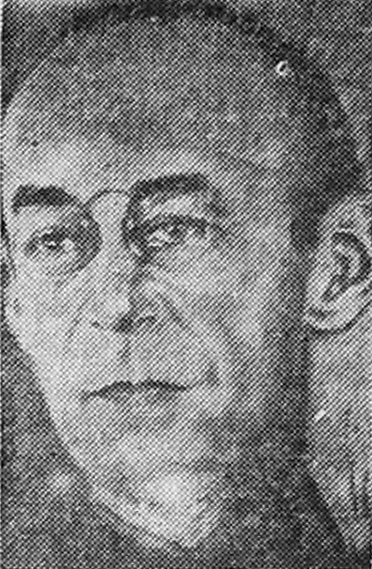

Ambassador of Chile to Peru
- In office 1934–193?
- Preceded by: Manuel Rivas Vicuña
- Succeeded by: Alfredo Duhal de Vásquez

Ambassador of Chile to Spain
- In office 1951–1953
- Preceded by: Jorge Barriga Errázuriz
- Succeeded by: Óscar Salas Letelier

Ambassador of Chile to the Holy See
- In office 1924–1930
- Preceded by: Horacio Fernández
- Succeeded by: Ricardo Ahumada

Personal details
- Born: 10 May 1882 Santiago, Chile
- Died: 1973 (aged 90–91)
- Sports career
- National team: Chile
- Sport: Athletics
- Events: 100 meters, 400 meters, 800 meters, High jump, Football
- Team: Club de Deportes Santiago Morning

Luis Subercaseaux Errázuriz (10 May 1882 – 1973) was a Chilean diplomat and athlete. He is claimed to be the first Chilean and Latin American sportsman to have competed in the Olympic Games, at the 1896 Summer Olympics in Athens.

== Biography ==
Born in Santiago, he was the second son of Ramón Subercaseaux Vicuña, a career diplomat, Ambassador of Chile to the Holy See for more than two decades, and Amalia Errázuriz de Subercaseaux (née Errázuriz Urmeneta), writer and author of the book "Rome of the spirit". Both his parents were members of well-known and well-off families. Luis Subercaseaux Errázuriz was the brother of Juan Subercaseaux, a Roman Catholic archbishop.

According to the Comité Olímpico de Chile, Luis Subercaseaux Errázuriz competed at the age of 13 in the 100, 400 and 800 metres. Many Olympic historians dispute this claim and maintain that, although he was entered in these events, he did not take part in any race. The International Olympic Committee website lists him as a non-starter in the 100 metres and the 800 metres, and does not list him in the 400 metres. An appraisal of a famous photo of series 2 of the 100 meters sprint, performed by facial recognition experts of the Chilean forensic police, concluded that Subercaseaux was one of the participants.

During this period in his life, he studied at the Colegio Benedictino located in the Basque Provinces of France, where he kept his record on the high jump. He was also one of the founding members of the Chilean football team Club de Deportes Santiago Morning and a successful football player.

Through 1928 he was ambassador of Chile in Peru, Spain and the Vatican, in addition to being an attendant of Chilean business in Belgium, Czechoslovakia, Greece, the Netherlands, Norway, Poland and Yugoslavia from the consular office in London.

A memorial to Subercaseaux stands in the entrance of the Chilean Olympic Museum.

== See also ==
- Subercaseaux – Chilean family of French descent
