= José Tomás Errázuriz =

Chilean landscape painter and diplomat

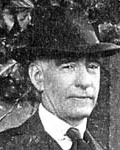
- Photograph from before 1919
- Born: José Tomás Errázuriz Urmeneta; November 1856; Santiago, Chile
- Died: 1 April 1927 (aged 70) near London
- Education: Academy of Painting
- Occupations: Painter; diplomat
- Known for: landscape painting
- Spouse: Eugenia Huici de Errázuriz (m. 1879)

José Tomás Errázuriz Urmeneta (November, 1856 – 1 April 1927) was a Chilean landscape painter and diplomat.

== Biography ==
He was born in Santiago, the son of Maximiano Errázuriz Valdivieso and of Amalia Urmeneta Quiroga. He studied painting at the Academy of Painting (Santiago, Chile), where he was a student of Ernesto Kirchbach and later juggled his diplomatic work in Paris, with art classes by an otherwise unknown painter named Humbert Giroez.

Around 1900, the Errázurizes relocated to London. José Tomás Errázuriz fell sick with tuberculosis, spent much time in Switzerland, and eventually he and his wife became estranged. Nonetheless during this stay, he acquired for his art most of the characteristics of English painting, even though he was also a strong admirer of the French landscape tradition and painted many times the coast of Normandy, where he lived for long periods of time. A sharp observer of nature, he painted views and scenes of the European countryside full of light and color. Errázuriz never adhered to the impressionist movement of the time, even though he was a close friend and admirer of realist painters such as Giovanni Boldini and John Singer Sargent. He always gave a principal and very strict preponderance to the drawing and the composition in his work. Errázuriz was never interested in signing or selling his work, and in 1926 sent most of his paintings to Chile to be auctioned off for charity.

== Personal life ==
On 16 June 1879, Errázuriz married Eugenia Huici de Errázuriz (née Huici Arguedas), a patron of modernism of the 20th Century and noted interior designer, and who was a decisive influence in his work. Errázuriz and Huici had three children.

== Selected paintings ==
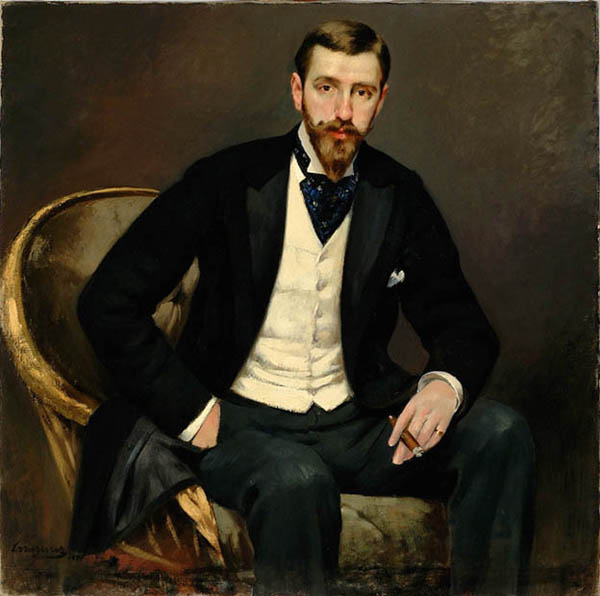
Portrait of his brother Rafael

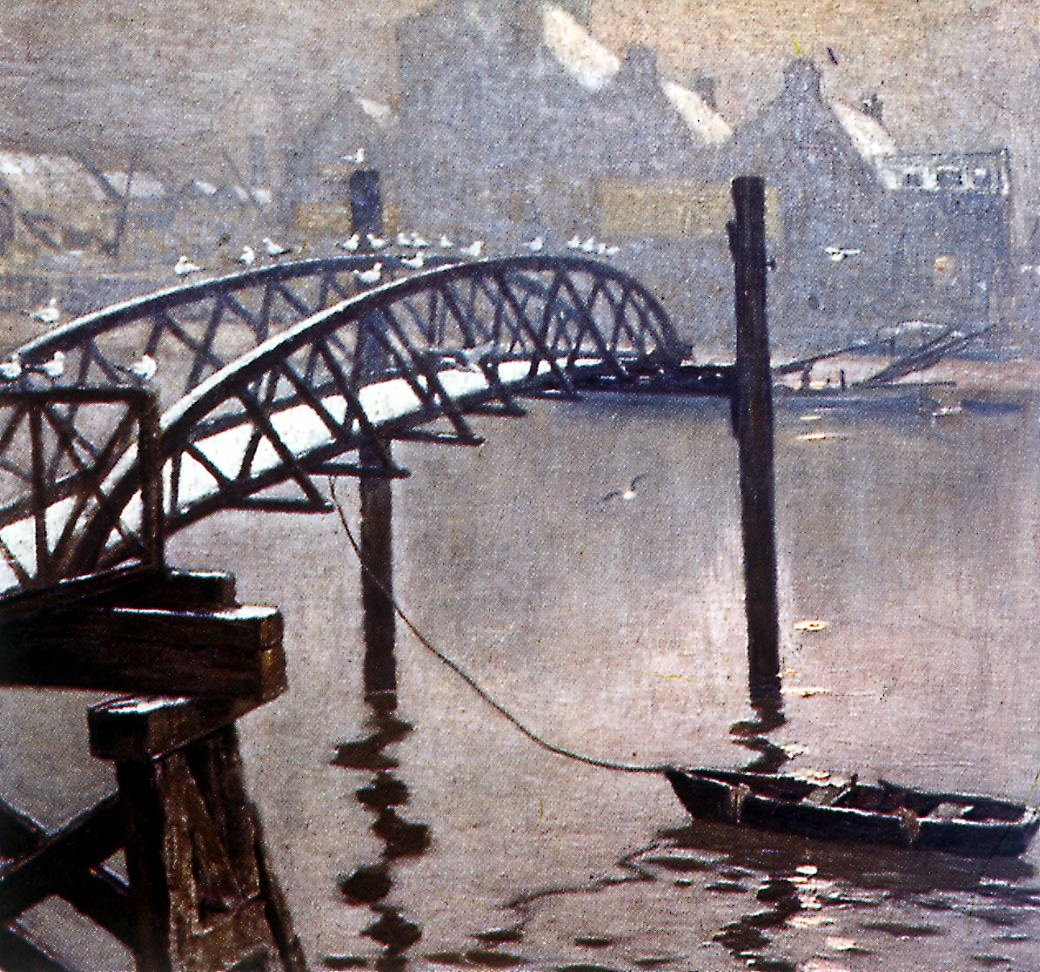
Seagulls on the River Thames

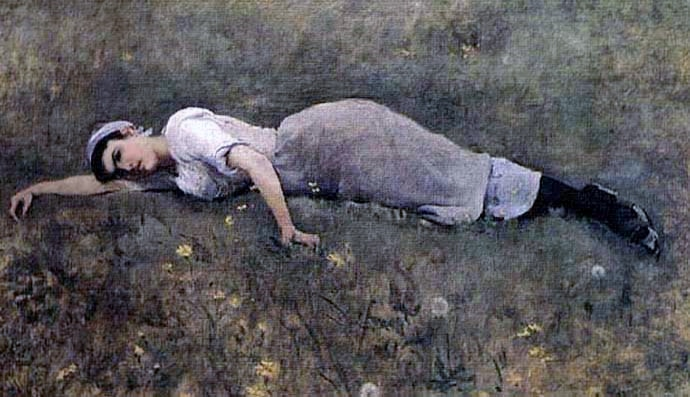
Peasant Woman Resting

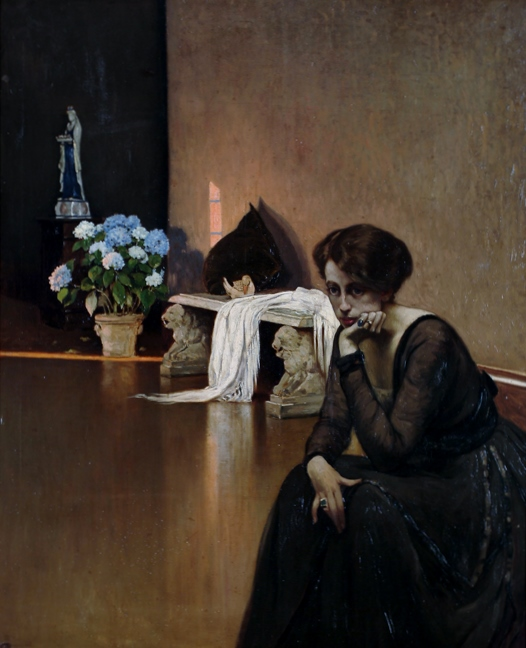
Anguish

== See also ==
- Álvaro Casanova Zenteno
- Eugenio Cruz Vargas
- Eugenia Errázuriz
- Rafael Errázuriz Urmeneta
