= Federico Errázuriz Zañartu =

Chilean political figure

Federico Errázuriz
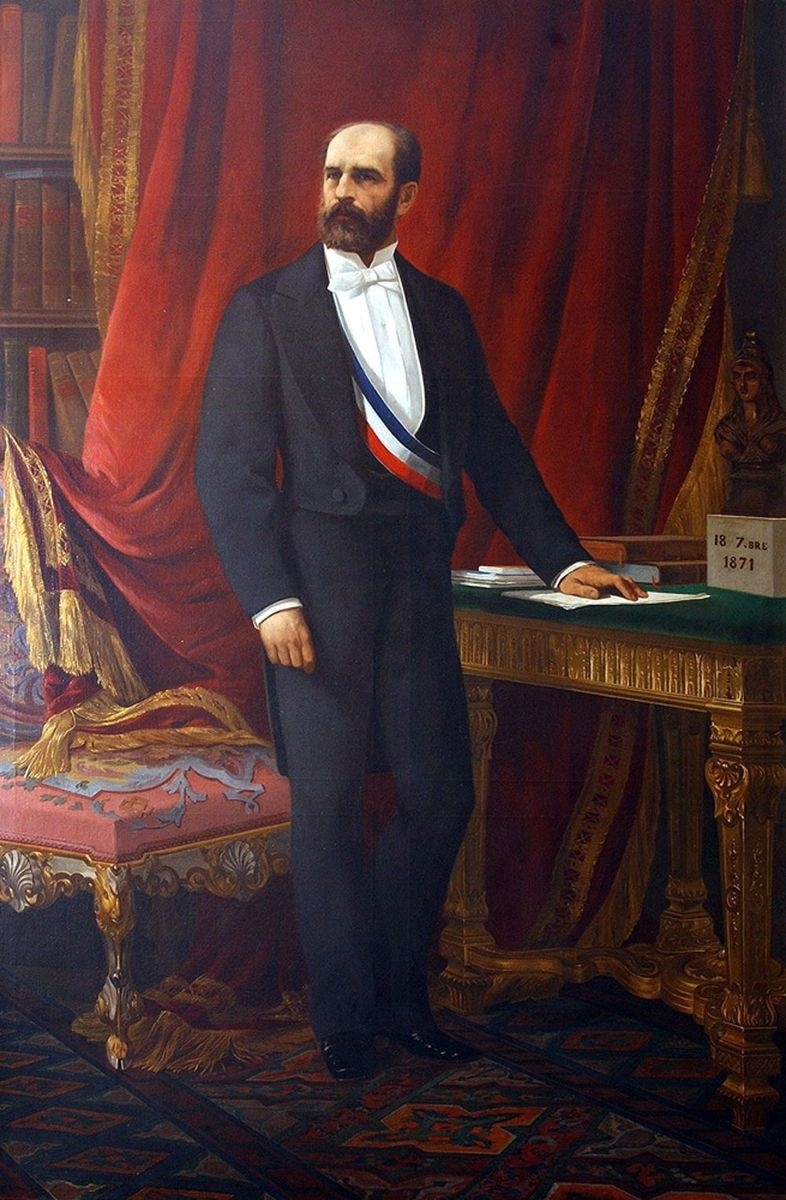

8th President of Chile
- In office September 18, 1871 – September 18, 1876
- Preceded by: José Joaquín Pérez
- Succeeded by: Aníbal Pinto

Personal details
- Born: April 25, 1825 Santiago, Chile
- Died: July 20, 1877 (aged 52) Santiago, Chile
- Party: Liberal
- Spouse: Eulogia Echaurren

Federico Marcos del Rosario Errázuriz Zañartu (Latin American Spanish: [feðeˈɾico eˈrasuɾis saˈɲaɾtu]; April 25, 1825 – July 20, 1877) was a Chilean political figure. He served as the president of Chile between 1871 and 1876.

== Biography ==
He was born on 25 April 1825 Santiago to Francisco Javier Errázuriz Aldunate and Josefa Zañartu Manso de Velasco. He was of Basque descent. He studied law in the University of Chile.

He was made a deputy in parliament at an early age, and took some part in the parliamentary debates. In 1860 he was made chief of the province of Santiago, and introduced many reforms. In 1862, during Pérez's administration, he became secretary of justice and of public instruction; and in 1865, during the Chincha Islands War with Spain, he was secretary of war and the navy.

In 1871 Errázuriz became president of the republic of Chile, and introduced liberal reforms of great importance to the country, tending toward the secularization of public instruction and freedom of worship. He amended the constitution of 1833 by means of a law which was very much discussed in congress, abolished ecclesiastical privileges, and built several railways in the northern and southern parts of the country. He also organized several exhibitions of industry and art, the most important being the Exposición Universal of 1875, held in a magnificent palace built in the Quinta Normal de Agricultura expressly for that purpose. Errázuriz improved the navy by adding to it the two steel men-of-war “Cochrane” and “Blanco Encalada.” He also improved the condition of the army, and contributed greatly to the material progress and welfare of his country.

He died in Santiago soon after retiring from office.

== Notes ==
Political offices
Preceded by José Manuel Pinto	Minister of War and Navy; 1866 - 1868	Succeeded by Francisco Echaurren
Preceded by José Joaquín Pérez	President of Chile; 1871-1876	Succeeded by Aníbal Pinto
