= Juan Subercaseaux =

Chilean Catholic archbishop (1896–1942)

- Monsignor
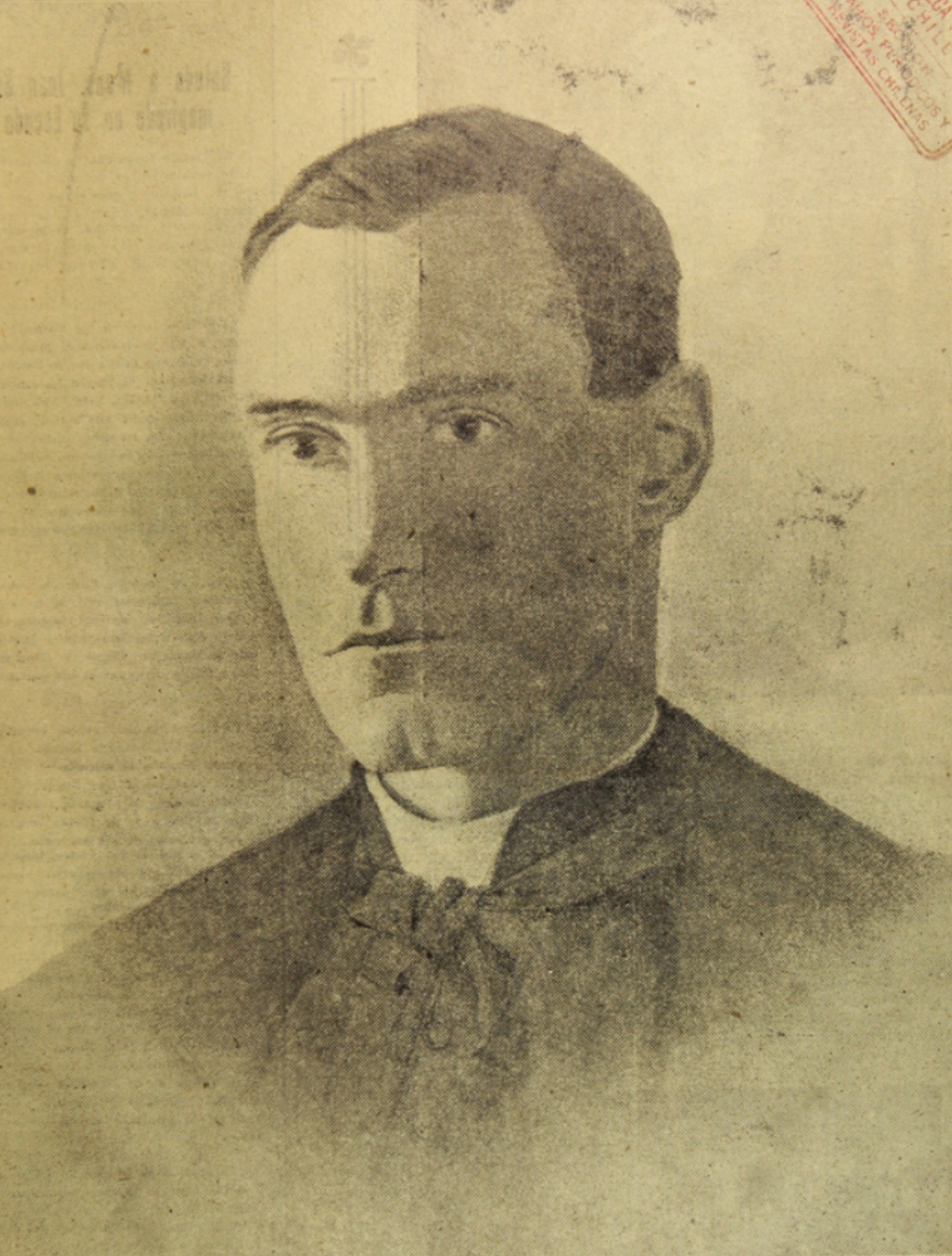
- Church: Roman Catholic
- Appointed: Archbishop of La Serena
- In office: 1940–1942
- Predecessor: José María Caro Rodríguez
- Successor: Alfredo Cifuentes Gómez
- Previous post: Bishop of Linares

Orders
- Ordination: 3 April 1920

Personal details
- Born: Juan Subercaseaux Errázuriz; 26 August 1896 Santiago, Chile
- Died: 9 August 1942 (aged 45) Near La Serena, Chile
- Parents: Ramón Subercaseaux Vicuña; Amalia Errázuriz de Subercaseaux
- Education: Seminario Pontificio Mayor de Santiago; Pontifical Latin American College; Accademia dei Nobili Ecclesiastici

Mons Juan Subercaseaux Errázuriz (26 August 1896 – 9 August 1942) was a Chilean Roman Catholic archbishop. Juan Subercaseaux was of French and Basque descent.

== Biography ==
Juan Subercaseaux was born in Santiago, the son of Ramón Subercaseaux Vicuña, a career diplomat, Ambassador of Chile to the Holy See for more than two decades and Amalia Errázuriz de Subercaseaux (née Errázuriz Urmeneta), a writer and author of the book "Rome of the spirit". Young Juan was educated in the values of the faith, in a deeply Catholic family, had as spiritual director the famous Chilean priest, Miguel León Prado, who would become, years later, the first bishop of the Diocese of Linares. Subercaseaux was educated at St. Ignatius College, before studying at the Seminario Pontificio Mayor de Santiago.

After his ordination he continued his studies of Philosophy and Theology in Rome, initially at the Pontificia Università Gregoriana and, subsequently, at the Pontifical Latin American College of Rome and at the Accademia dei Nobili Ecclesiastici, where he obtained the doctorate in Philosophy and Theology.

Ordained Priest of Santiago de Chile on 3 April 1920, he was consecrated Bishop of Linares on 28 April 1935 by the Apostolic Nuncio in Chile, Archbishop Ettore Felici. Appointed Archbishop of La Serena in 1940. He was awarded the Order of the Crown of Italy and died in a road accident near La Serena.

== Ecclesiastical life ==
Date	Event	Title
26 August 1896	Born	Santiago, Chile
3 April 1920	Ordained Priest	Priest of Santiago de Chile
23 February 1935	Appointed	Bishop of Linares, Chile
28 April 1935	Consecrated Bishop	Bishop of Linares, Chile
12 May 1935	Installed	Bishop of Linares, Chile
8 January 1940	Appointed	Archbishop of La Serena, Chile
9 April 1940	Installed	Archbishop of La Serena, Chile
9 August 1942	Died	Archbishop of La Serena, Chile

== Additional information ==
=== See also ===
- Subercaseaux family

=== Sources ===
- Catholic Hierarchy
- Buena Nueva, periodical of Linares Diocese (Chile).
