= Archdiocese of Santiago de Chile =

Latin Catholic archdiocese in Chile

Coordinates: 33.4376°S 70.6516°W

Archdiocese of Santiago de Chile Archidioecesis Sancti Iacobi in Chile Arquidiócesis de Santiago de Chile

Catholic

Location
- Country: Chile
- Ecclesiastical province: Santiago de Chile

Statistics
- Area: 9,193 km^{2} (3,549 sq mi)
- Population: Total; Catholics: (as of 2022); 6,283,000 (Note: Annuario Pontificio (2023) via Catholic-Hierarchy.org); 4,284,000 (68.2%)

Information
- Denomination: Catholic Church
- Sui iuris church: Latin Church
- Rite: Latin rites
- Established: 27 June 1561 (465 years ago)
- Cathedral: Santiago Metropolitan Cathedral
- Patron saint: St James the Greater
- Secular priests: 465 (216 diocesan; 249 religious)
- Language: Latin; Spanish

Current leadership
- Pope: Leo XIV
- Metropolitan Archbishop: Fernando Chomalí Garib
- Auxiliary Bishops: Andres Arteaga Manieu; Alvaro Chordi Miranda; Alberto Lorenzelli Rossi; Luis Alberto Migone Repetto; Cristian Carlos Roncagliolo Pacheco
- Bishops emeritus: Francisco Javier Errázuriz Ossa; Ricardo Ezzati Andrello; Celestino Aós Braco

Map

Website
- iglesiadesantiago.cl

The Metropolitan Archdiocese of Santiago de Chile (Latin: Archidioecesis Metropolitae Sancti Iacobi in Chile) is one of the five Latin metropolitan sees of the Catholic Church in Chile.

== Ecclesiastical province ==
Its Suffragan sees are:

- Roman Catholic Diocese of Linares
- Roman Catholic Diocese of Melipilla
- Roman Catholic Diocese of Rancagua
- Roman Catholic Diocese of San Bernardo
- Roman Catholic Diocese of San Felipe, Chile
- Roman Catholic Diocese of Talca
- Roman Catholic Diocese of Valparaíso

== Special churches ==
Its cathedral archiepiscopal see is the Metropolitan Cathedral of Santiago in the national capital Santiago de Chile.

It also has six Minor Basilicas:

- Votive Temple of Maipú, a National Shrine in Maipú
- Basilica of Lourdes
- Basilica de la Merced
- Basílica de Nuestra Señora del Perpetuo Socorro
- Basílica del Corazón de María, (Marian)
- Basílica del Salvador, dedicated to the savior.

== History ==
- On 27 June 1561, Pope Pius IV established the Diocese of Santiago de Chile, on territories split off from the Diocese of La Plata o Charcas and the Archdiocese of Lima.
- It lost territories repeatedly: on 22 May 1563 to establish the Diocese of Concepción, on 10 May 1570 to establish the Diocese of Córdoba and on 1806.03.28 to establish the Diocese of Salta.
- Pope Gregory XVI elevated the bishopric to Metropolitan Archdiocese of Santiago de Chile on 21 May 1840.
- Since then it has lost territory five more times: on 1840.07.01 to establish the then Diocese of La Serena (now an Archdiocese), on 1872.11.02: Lost territory to establish the then Mission sui juris of Valparaíso (now Diocese of Valparaíso, on 1925.10.18 to establish the Diocese of Rancagua, Diocese of San Felipe and Diocese of Talca, on 1987.07.13 to establish Diocese of San Bernardo (1987), and on 1991.04.04 to establish the Diocese of Melipilla (1991).
- Pope John Paul II visited the Archdiocese on 1 April 1987.

== Statistics ==
As per 2014, it pastorally served 4,205,000 Catholics (66.9% of 6,290,000 total) on 9,132 km^{2} in 213 parishes and a mission with 877 priests (250 diocesan, 627 religious), 339 deacons, 3,109 lay religious (1,255 brothers, 1,854 sisters), 46 seminarians.

== Ordinaries ==
=== Bishops of Santiago de Chile ===
- Rodrigo González de Marmolejo (1561–1564)
- Fernando de Barrionuevo (1566–1571)
- Diego de Medellín (1574–1593)
- Pedro de Azuaga (1596–1597)
- Juan Pérez de Espinosa (1600–1622)
- Francisco González de Salcedo Castro (1622–1634)
- Gaspar de Villarroel (1637–1651), appointed Bishop of Arequipa and later Archbishop of La Plata
- Diego de Zambrana de Villalobos y Cordero (1653), did not take effect
- Diego de Humansoro Carantía (1660–1676)
- Bernardo de Carrasco y Saavedra, O.P. (1678–1694), appointed Bishop of La Paz
- Francisco de la Puebla González (1694–1704)
- Luis Francisco Romero (1705–1717), appointed Bishop of Quito and later Archbishop of La Plata
- Alejo Fernando de Rojas y Acevedo (1718–1723), appointed Bishop of La Paz
- Alonso del Pozo y Silva (1723–1730), appointed Archbishop of La Plata
- José Manuel de Sarricolea y Olea (1730–1734), appointed Bishop of Cusco
- Juan Bravo del Rivero y Correa (1734–1743), appointed Bishop of Arequipa
- Juan González Melgarejo (1743–1753), appointed Bishop of Arequipa
- Manuel de Alday y Axpée (1753–1789)
- Blas Manuel Sobrino y Minayo (1788–1794), appointed Bishop of Trujillo
- Francisco José Marán (1794–1807)
- José Santiago Rodríguez Zorrilla (1815–1832)
- Manuel Vicuña Larraín (1832–1840)

=== Metropolitan Archbishops of Santiago de Chile ===
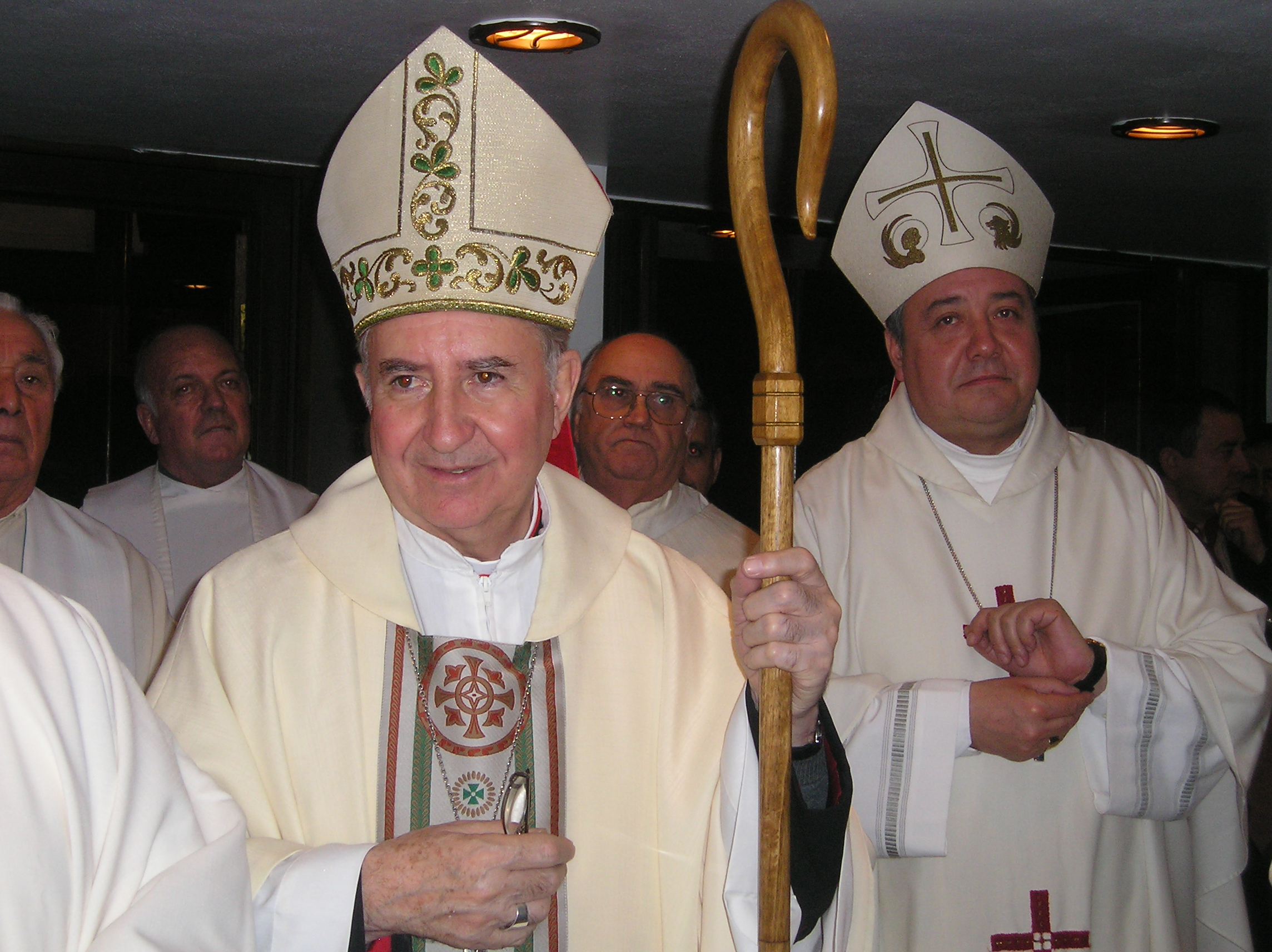
Francisco Javier Errázuriz Ossa, Archbishop Emeritus of Santiago de Chile

- Manuel Vicuña Larraín (1840–1843)
- Rafael Valentín Valdivieso y Zañartu (1847–1878)
- Mariano Casanova y Casanova (1886–1906)
- Juan Ignacio González Eyzaguirre (1908–1918)
- Crescente Errázuriz Valdivieso (1918–1931)
- José Horacio Campillo Infante (1931–1939)
- José María Cardinal Caro Rodríguez (1939–1958)
- Raúl Cardinal Silva Henríquez (1961–1983)
- Juan Cardinal Francisco Fresno (1983–1990)
- Carlos Cardinal Oviedo Cavada (1990–1998)
- Francisco Javier Cardinal Errázuriz Ossa (1998–2010)
- Ricardo Cardinal Ezzati Andrello (15 December 2010 – 23 March 2019)
- Celestino Cardinal Aós Braco (11 January 2020 – 25 October 2023)
- Fernando Chomalí Garib (25 October 2023 – present)

== Other affiliated bishops ==
=== Auxiliary bishops ===
- Manuel Vicuña Larraín (1828–1832), appointed Bishop here
- José Ignacio Cienfuegos Arteaga (1828–1832), appointed Bishop of Concepción
- José Miguel Arístegui Aróstegui (1869–1876)
- Joaquín Larraín Gandarillas (1877–1897), became Archbishop (personal title) in 1893
- Jorge Montes Solar (1892–1900)
- José Ramón Astorga Salinas (1899–1906)
- Rafael Fernández Concha (1901–1912)
- Miguel Claro Vásquez (1921), did not take effect (died on the day he was appointed)
- Rafael Edwards Salas (1921–1938)
- Antonio José Luis Castro Alvarez, SS.CC. (1926–1935)
- Augusto Osvaldo Salinas Fuenzalida, SS.CC. (1941–1950), appointed Bishop of San Carlos de Ancud
- Pio Alberto Fariña Fariña (1946–1971)
- Emilio Tagle Covarrubias (1958–1961), becoming Apostolic Administrator and titular Archbishop in 1959; appointed Archbishop (personal title) of Valparaíso
- Gabriel Larraín Valdivieso (1966–1968)
- Fernando Ariztía Ruiz (1967–1976), appointed Bishop of Copiapó
- Fernando (José Ismael) Errázuriz Gandarillas (1969–1973)
- Sergio Valech Aldunate (1973–2003)
- Enrique Alvear Urrutia (1974–1982)
- Jorge Maria Hourton Poisson (1974–1992), appointed Auxiliary Bishop of Temuco
- Manuel Camilo Vial Risopatrón (1980–1983), appointed Bishop of San Felipe
- Patricio Infante Alfonso (1984–1990), appointed Archbishop of Antofagasta
- Antonio Moreno Casamitjana (1986–1989), appointed Archbishop of Concepción (Santissima Concezione)
- Cristián Caro Cordero (1991–2001), appointed Archbishop of Puerto Montt
- Horacio del Carmen Valenzuela Abarca (1995–1996), appointed Bishop of Talca
- Ricardo Cardinal Ezzati Andrello (2001–2006), appointed Archbishop of Concepción (Santissima Concezione) (later returned here as Archbishop); future Cardinal
- Andrés Arteaga Manieu (2001–)
- Cristián Contreras Villarroel (2003–2014), appointed Bishop of Melipilla
- Fernando Chomalí Garib (2006–2011), appointed Archbishop of Concepción
- Pedro Mario Ossandón Buljevic (2012–)
- Galo Fernández Villaseca (2014–)
- Luis Fernando Ramos Pérez (2014–2019), appointed Archbishop of Puerto Montt
- Jorge Enrique Concha Cayuqueo (2015–2020), appointed Bishop of Osorno
- Cristián Carlos Roncagliolo Pacheco (2017–)
- Carlos Eugenio Irarrázaval Errázuriz (2019); did not take effect
- Alberto Ricardo Lorenzelli Rossi (2019–)

=== Other priests of this diocese who became bishops ===
- Pedro Felipe de Azúa e Iturgoyen, appointed Auxiliary Bishop of Concepción in 1735
- José de Toro y Zambrano, appointed Bishop of Concepción in 1744
- Pedro Miguel Argandoña Pastene Salazar, appointed Bishop of Córdoba (Tucumán), Argentina in 1745
- Diego Antonio Elizondo y Prado, appointed Bishop of Concepción in 1840
- José Agustín de la Sierra Mercado, appointed Bishop of La Serena in 1842
- Justo Donoso Vivanco, appointed Bishop of San Carlos de Ancud in 1848
- Vicente Gabriel Tocornal Velasco, appointed Bishop of San Carlos de Ancud, Chile in 1853; did not take effect
- José Hipólito Salas y Toro, appointed Bishop of Concepción in 1854
- José Manuel Orrego Pizarro, appointed Bishop of La Serena in 1868
- Plácido Labarca Olivares, appointed Vicar Apostolic of Tarapacá in 1887; appointed Bishop of Concepción in 1890 (consecrated bishop in 1890)
- Florencio Eduardo Fontecilla Sánchez, appointed Bishop of La Serena in 1890
- Rafael Molina Cortez, appointed Titular Bishop of Sinopoli in 1884 (died in 1889 without being consecrated)
- Ramón Ángel Jara Ruz, appointed Vicar General of Valparaíso in 1894; appointed Bishop of San Carlos de Ancud in 1898
- Luis Enrique Izquierdo Vargas, appointed Bishop of Concepción in 1906
- Eduardo Gimpert Paut, appointed Vicar General of Valparaíso in 1906 (titular bishop in 1916)
- Luís Silva Lezaeta, appointed Vicar Apostolic of Antofagasta in 1904 (consecrated bishop in 1912)
- Gilberto Fuenzalida Guzmán, appointed Bishop of Concepción in 1918
- Carlos Silva Cotapos, appointed Bishop of La Serena in 1918
- Prudencio Contardo Ibarra (priest here, 1883–1906), appointed Vicar General of Temuco (and titular bishop) in 1920
- Martín Rucker Sotomayor, appointed Titular Bishop of Mariamme in 1923
- Miguel León Prado, appointed Vicar General of Talca in 1913; appointed Bishop of Linares in 1925
- Melquisedec del Canto Terán, appointed Bishop of San Felipe in 1925
- Rafael Lira Infante, appointed Bishop of Rancagua in 1925
- Carlos Labbé Márquez, appointed Vicar Apostolic of Tarapacá in 1926
- Alfredo Cifuentes Gómez, appointed Bishop of Antofagasta in 1933
- Ramón Munita Eyzaguirre, appointed Bishop of San Carlos de Ancud in 1934
- Alfredo Silva Santiago, appointed Bishop of Temuco in 1935
- Juan Subercaseaux Errázuriz, appointed Bishop of Linares in 1935
- Jorge Antonio Larraín Cotapos, appointed Bishop of Chillán in 1937
- Eduardo Larraín Córdovez, appointed Bishop of Rancagua in 1938
- Manuel Larraín Errazuriz, appointed Coadjutor Bishop of Talca in 1938
- Hernán Frías Hurtado, appointed Bishop of San Carlos de Ancud in 1940
- Francisco Javier Valdivia Pinedo, appointed Bishop of Linares in 1940; did not take effect
- Alejandro Menchaca Lira, appointed Bishop of Temuco in 1941
- Roberto Moreira Martínez, appointed Bishop of Linares in 1941
- Eladio Vicuña Aránguiz, appointedBishop of Chillán in 1955
- Bernardino Piñera Carvallo, appointed Auxiliary Bishop of Talca in 1958
- Alberto Rencoret Donoso, appointed Bishop of Puerto Montt in 1958
- José Luis Castro Cabrera, appointed Bishop of San Felipe in 1963
- Raul Silva Silva, appointed Auxiliary Bishop of Rancagua in 1963
- Carlos González Cruchaga, appointed Bishop of Talca in 1967
- Ignacio Ortuzar Rojas, appointed Auxiliary Bishop of Puerto Maldonado, Peru in 1968; did not take effect
- Alberto Jara Franzoy, appointed Bishop of Chillán in 1982
- José Joaquín Matte Varas, appointed Bishop of Chile, Military in 1983
- Jorge Arturo Augustin Medina Estévez, appointed Auxiliary Bishop of Rancagua in 1984; future Cardinal
- Pablo Lizama Riquelme, appointed Prelate of Illapel in 1985
- Enrique Troncoso Troncoso, appointed Bishop of Iquique in 1989
- Pedro Felipe Bacarreza Rodríguez, appointed Auxiliary Bishop of Concepción (Santissima Concezione) in 1991
- Juan de la Cruz Barros Madrid, appointed Auxiliary Bishop of Valparaíso in 1995
- Tomislav Koljatic Maroevic, appointed Auxiliary Bishop of Concepción (Santissima Concezione) in 1997
- Ignacio Francisco Ducasse Medina, appointed Bishop of Valdivia in 2002
- Guillermo Patricio Vera Soto (priest here, 1982–1991), appointed Prelate of Calama in 2003
- Moisés Carlos Atisha Contreras, appointed Bishop of San Marcos de Arica in 2014

== Sexual abuse lawsuit ==
On October 21, 2018, it was reported that Chile's Court of Appeal ordered the office of Santiago's Archbishop to pay 450 million pesos ($650,000) to three men who stated they were sexually abused for decades by Chilean priest Fernando Karadima. Court President Dobra Lusic denied on October 22 that a verdict had been reached and that the lawsuit was still ongoing. A complaint issued on October 25, 2018, accused former Archbishop Cardinal Francisco Javier Errázuriz Ossa of leading the cover-up of sex abuse committed by Karadima. The complaint also named former Apostolic Nuncio to Chile Archbishop Giuseppe Pinto, Chilean Minister of the Court of Appeals Juan Manuel Muñoz, Archbishop of Santiago Cardinal Ricardo Ezzati Andrello, and the Auxiliary Bishop of Santiago Andrés Arteaga Manieu as witnesses to the cover-up On March 27, 2019, however the Court of Appeals ordered the Archdiocese to pay 100 million pesos (about US$147,000) for "moral damages" to each of the survivors: Juan Carlos Cruz, José Andrés Murillo and James Hamilton. The ruling was confirmed by their lawyer and Santiago Bishop Celestino Aos on March 28.

== See also ==
- List of Catholic dioceses in Chile

== Sources and external links ==
- Archdiocese of Santiago de Chile profile at Catholic-Hierarchy.org
- Metropolitan Archdiocese of Santiago de Chile profile at GCatholic.org
