= José Ignacio Cienfuegos =

Chilean priest and political figure

- Bishop of Concepción
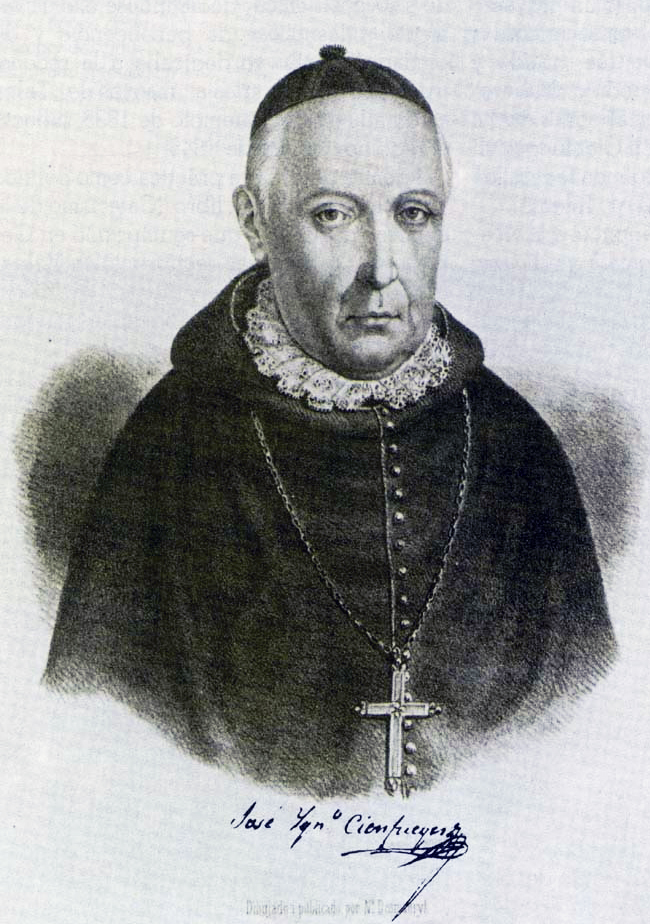
- José Ignacio Cienfuegos
- Church: Catholic Church
- Diocese: Diocese of Concepción
- In office: 17 December 1832 – 27 April 1840
- Predecessor: Diego Antonio Navarro Martín de Villodras
- Successor: Diego Elizondo Prado
- Previous posts: Titular Bishop of Rhithymna (1828-1832); Auxiliary Bishop of Santiago de Chile (1828-1832)

Orders
- Ordination: 23 December 1836
- Consecration: 27 December 1828 by Antonio Domenico Gamberini

Personal details
- Born: José Ignacio Cienfuegos Arteaga; 1 October 1762 Santiago, Captaincy General of Chile, Viceroyalty of Peru, Spanish Empire
- Died: 8 November 1845 (aged 83) Concepción, Republic of Chile

Fr. José Ignacio Cienfuegos Arteaga (1 October 1762 – 8 November 1847) was a Chilean priest, Roman Catholic bishop of Concepción and political figure. He served twice as President of the Senate of Chile.

== Biography ==
Cienfuegos was born in Santiago, the son of Francisco Cienfuegos and of Josefa Arteaga Martínez. He studied Theology at the Universidad Real de San Felipe and was later ordained as a priest in 1778. Cienfuegos became a Dominican friar and in 1790 was named priest of Talca, where he worked for 23 years. As such, he actively participated in the independence movement in Chile.

On October 9, 1813, he became a member of the Government Junta. During his term the junta adopted the national flag, founded the National institute of science and numerous primary schools throughout the country. In March 1814, Cienfuegos was elected titular member of the Consultive Senate of Chile. In 1814, after the defeat in the battle of Rancagua, Royalist General Mariano Osorio deported him to the Juan Fernández Islands, where he remained for two years. He was allowed to return after the victory at the battle of Chacabuco in 1817. He was named administrator of the Santiago Cathedral in 1818 and participated in the formulation of the Chilean Constitution of 1818. He was a member and President of the Conservative Senate of Chile between 1818 and 1820.

In 1821, Cienfuegos was sent to Rome as ambassador to try to negotiate the recognition of the Chilean independence. He returned to Chile in 1824 and became the Apostolic Administrator of the Santiago diocese while at the same time being one of the principal promoters of the Federalist attempt in Chile. In 1825 he became the President of the Provincial Assembly of Santiago and in 1826 participated in the constitutional congress as a deputy for Talca. Cienfuegos was returned as ambassador to the Holy See, where he was named titular Titular bishop of Retimo on December 15, 1828. He was elected Senator for Concepción on 1831, and again became President of the Conservative Senate of Chile between 1831 and 1834. On 17 December 1832, was named Bishop of Concepción.

On 1839 he resigned his bishopric and retired to the city of Talca, where he continue to work as a priest until his death on 8 November 1847, at the age of 85.

== Sources ==
- Biblioteca del Congreso Nacional de Chile : José_Ignacio_Cienfuegos_Arteaga

Political offices
Preceded by José Antonio Errázuriz	President of the Conservative Senate of Chile; 1818-1822	Succeeded by Agustín Eyzaguirre
Preceded by José María Novoa	President of the Conservative Senate of Chile; 1831-1834	Succeeded by Diego Elizondo Prado
