= Joaquín Larraín Gandarillas =

Chilean priest, bishop, professor and writer

Monsignor Joaquín Larraín Gandarillas
- Auxiliary bishop of Santiago de Chile
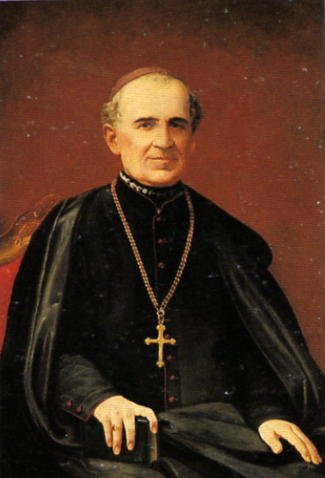
- Church: Roman Catholic
- Archdiocese: Archdiocese of Santiago de Chile
- Installed: 1 March 1878
- Term ended: 26 September 1897
- Predecessor: José Miguel Arístegui Aróstegui
- Successor: Jorge Montes Solar
- Other post: Rector of Pontifical Catholic University of Chile

Orders
- Ordination: 16 February 1856 by Diego Elizondo Prado
- Consecration: 20 Mar 1847 by Rafael Valentín Valdivieso

Personal details
- Born: 18 October 1822 Santiago, Chile
- Died: September 26, 1897 (aged 74) Santiago, Chile
- Buried: Santiago Metropolitan Cathedral
- Parents: Juan Francisco Larraín Rojas and María Mercedes Gandarillas Aránguiz
- Education: Instituto Nacional General José Miguel Carrera

Joaquín Larraín Gandarillas (October 13, 1822 - September 26, 1897) was a Chilean priest, Roman Catholic bishop of Santiago, professor, writer and first president of the Pontifical Catholic University of Chile.

== Early life ==
He was born in Santiago, Chile, the sixth of 15 children of Juan Francisco Larraín Rojas and Mercedes Gandarillas Aránguiz. He studied at the prestigious Instituto Nacional, in Santiago and from there he went to the Santiago Seminary. In 1844 he graduated in Theology and Law. After a long discernment, he decided to embrace the ecclesiastical career. Before entering the priesthood, the young Joaquín had written several impassioned articles dealing with apologetics and other religious subjects, in catholic magazines. Larraín Gandarillas was of Basque descent.

== Priesthood ==
After having fulfilled all the necessary stages, he was ordained as a priest and celebrated his first mass in the Church of the company (Santiago) on April 4, 1847. His priesthood and subsequent episcopate were characterized by the untiring energy and initiative that he applied to all his missions and in the exercise of his ministry.

He lived in the U.S. for some time, where he took part in the Plenary Council of North America as a delegate of the bishop of Richmond. In 1853 he was appointed Rector of the Santiago Seminary. One year earlier, Larraín Gandarillas had become a member of the Faculty of Theology of the University of Chile. In 1877 he was appointed auxiliary bishop of the Santiago archdiocese. He was the first president ("rector") of the Pontifical Catholic University of Chile, which was founded June 21, 1888 through a decree issued by the Santiago Archbishopric.

== Other assignments ==
In 1864 Larraín Gandarillas was elected as a member of parliament (diputado) for the (now extinct) electoral district of Rere, near Concepción. During his parliamentary tenure he was vocal in manifesting his strong religious convictions. He left parliament, in 1867.

Monsignor Joaquín Larraín Gandarillas died in Santiago in 1897, at the age of 75.

== Summary of ecclesiastical life ==
Date	Event	Title
October 13, 1822	Born	Santiago, Chile
March 8, 1847	Ordained Priest	
December 31, 1877	Appointed	Auxiliary bishop of Santiago de Chile and titular Bishop of Martiria
March 1, 1878	Ordained Bishop	
June 15, 1893	Appointed	Titular Archbishop of Anazarbus
September 26, 1897	Died	
