= Basílica de Nuestra Señora del Perpetuo Socorro =

Catholic Church in Santiago, Chile

Basilica of Our Lady of Perpetual Help
- Basílica de Nuestra Señora del Perpetuo Socorro
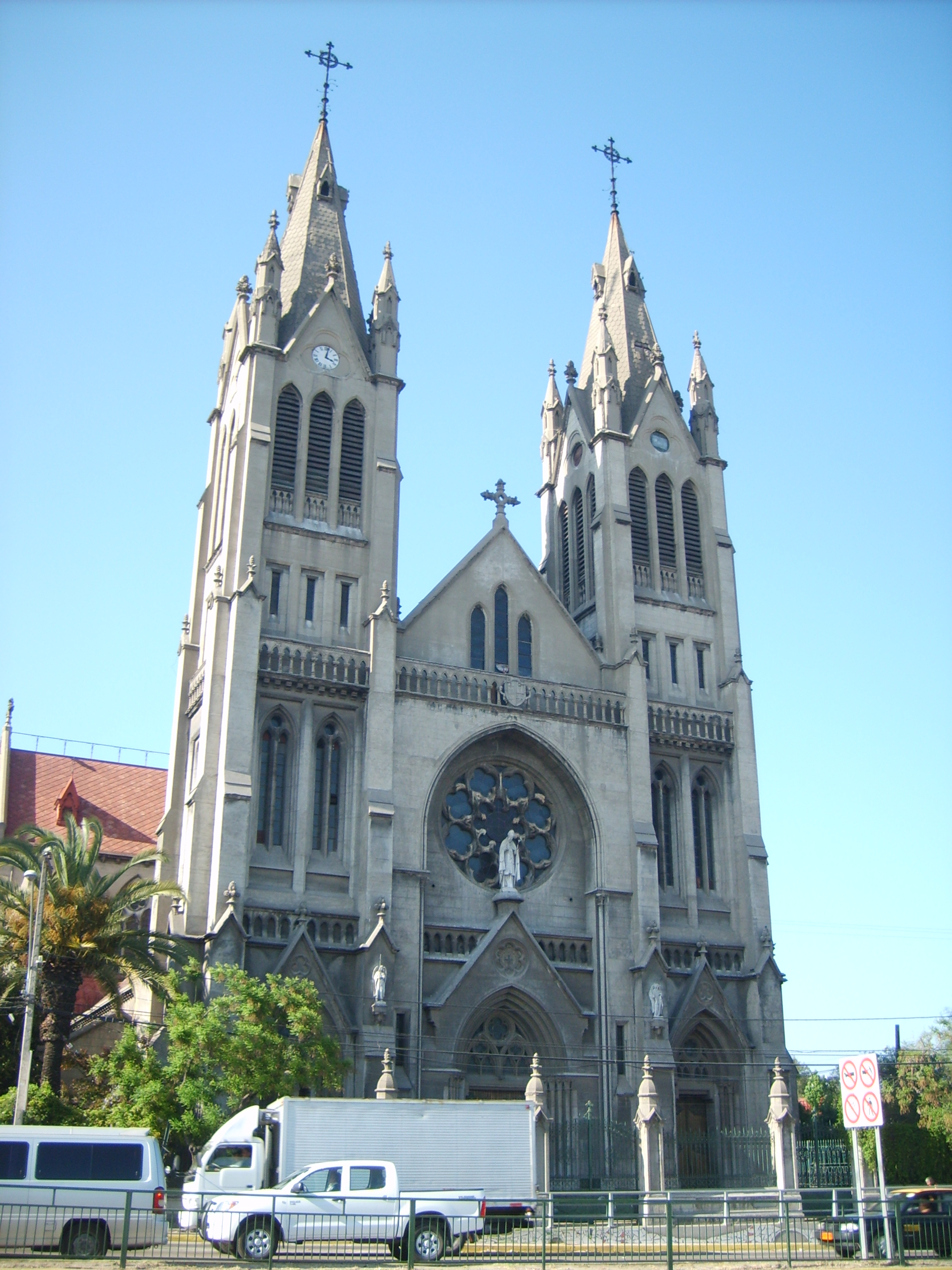
- Basilica of Our Lady of Perpetual Help
- 33°27′32″S 70°40′33″W
- Location: Santiago
- Country: Chile
- Denomination: Catholic Church
- Sui iuris church: Latin Church
- Religious order: Redemptorists
- Website: iglesiadesantiago.cl/parroquias/perpetuo-socorro

History
- Status: Minor Basilica
- Dedication: Nuestra Señora del Perpetuo Socorro; St. Alphonsus

Architecture
- Functional status: Active
- Architects: Gustave Knockaert; Huberto Boulangeot
- Architectural type: Parish church
- Style: Gothic Revival
- Groundbreaking: 1906
- Completed: 1919

Specifications
- Length: 68 metres (223 ft)
- Width: 30 metres (98 ft)

Administration
- Archdiocese: Santiago de Chile

Clergy
- Priests: José Javier Riquelme Aguayo (pastor); Andrés Sepulveda Pozo (parochial vicar); Carlos Humberto Perez Trivino (parochial vicar)

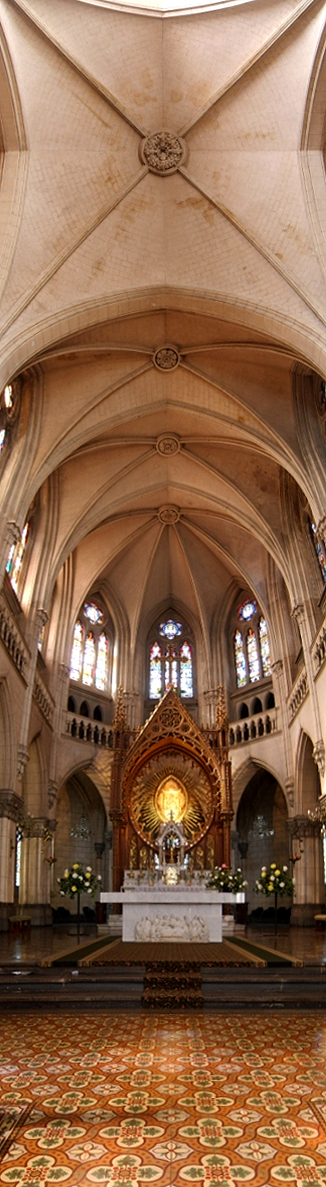
Interior of the basilica.

The Basílica de Nuestra Señora del Perpetuo Socorro is a Latin Catholic Church located in the comuna of Santiago, in the capital of Chile. It was designed in the Gothic Revival style by the religious architects Gustave Knockaert —known as «Brother Gerardo»— and Huberto Boulangeot. They were members of the Redemptorists.

The foundation stone was blessed and laid on 12 December 1904. The ownership of the land to build the church had been transferred from the Ugarte family by public deed on 26 April 1876.

Gustave Knockaert (1845-1928), a Belgian priest who previously had designed church buildings for his congregation in Madrid, Paris, Mulhouse and Les Sables-d'Olonne, was appointed to form a team of 15 architects. Among those was Huberto Boulangeot, who was designated as construction manager for the church project.

The construction of the church began in 1906, coinciding with the Valparaíso earthquake, which caused plans to be modified for additional structural reinforcement. The church was built with reinforced concrete, planned by the American engineer Juan Tonkin. Another collaborator was the brother Joaquín Chardin, a specialist in cement work, who contributed to the placing of the pointed arches, characteristic elements of the Gothic architecture. He also made the ornamental door of the sacristy, made from encina wood, and the coat of arms of the congregation that was carved on front entrance.

Garden features of the basilica were commissioned to brother Constancio, which included the gardens, greenhouse and the pond.

The blocks used for the interior columns of the church are from monolith formations and were carried from San José de Maipo using ox-drawn carts. These pieces were transported intact, between 1906 and 1907, to be carved and polished at the construction site. Stone was also extracted from San José de Maipo to make the bases, plinths and the steps.

The importation of goods was limited by the saltpetre economic crisis and World War I. As a result, that 8 of the 28 originally planned stained glasses and a rose window were never purchased, leaving those openings with bare glass.

The interior of the basilica includes confessionals made from roble americano wood and a French pipe organ made by Neuville Frères in 1897, which was, subsequently, declared a Monumento Histórico. The high altar was partially made in Belgium with marble and bronze, and was completed in Chile with lingue and American oak woods. Its centre includes an image of Our Lady of Perpetual Help, a replica of one found in the redemptorist church of Rome. The altars of Saint Alphonsus and of Our Lady of Mount Carmel were designed by the brother Huberto with bas-reliefs by the Spanish artist José Soria. The basilica is 68 metres (223 ft) long and 30 metres (98 ft) wide. The highest spire towers reach 55 and 65 metres (180 and 213 ft). The church has five naves, but only three of them were completed, the other two are closed and used as a hallway and a warehouse. The roof tiles were made from copper and lead.

In 1919, the Basilica was blessed with a Pontifical Mass headed by the then archbishop of Santiago, Crescente Errázuriz. On that day and in an exceptional way, the Argentine musician Domingo Santa Cruz celebrated a Te Deum.

The church was declared a Minor Basilica by the Holy See in 1926, being consecrated as such by the Papal ambassador Benedicto Marsella that same year.

== See also ==
- Catholic Church in Chile
