= Alberto Lorenzelli Rossi =

The Right Reverend Alberto Ricardo Lorenzelli Rossi S.D.B.
- Auxiliary Bishop of Santiago
- Church: Roman Catholic Church
- Archdiocese: Santiago
- See: Santiago
- Appointed: 22 May 2019
- Installed: 22 June 2019
- Other post: Titular Bishop of Sesta (2019-)
- Previous post: Provincial Superior of the Chilean Salesian Province (2012–18)

Orders
- Ordination: 24 January 1981 by Rosalio José Castillo Lara
- Consecration: 22 June 2019 by Pope Francis

Personal details
- Born: Alberto Ricardo Lorenzelli Rossi; 2 September 1953 (age 73) Isidro Casanova, Argentina
- Education: Pontifical Urban University; Pontifical Salesian University

Alberto Ricardo Lorenzelli Rossi, S.D.B. (born 2 September 1953) is an Argentina-born priest of the Catholic Church who has been appointed auxiliary bishop of Santiago, Chile. He is a member of the Salesians of Don Bosco and has held positions of administrative responsibility within that order in both Chile and Italy.

== Biography ==
He was born on 2 September 1953 in Isidro Casanova, in the province of Buenos Aires, Argentina, to a family of Italian immigrants that returned to Italy in the 1970s. He entered the novitiate of the Salesian Society of Saint John Bosco on 8 September 1972 in Pinerolo, Italy, and professed his perpetual vows on 15 September 1977. He completed his studies in philosophy and theology at the major seminary of Fassolo, a neighborhood of Genoa, Italy. He took his final vows on 15 September 1977.

He earned a licentiate in theology at the Pontifical Urban University in Rome and pursued advanced studies in psychological science at the Pontifical Salesian University in Rome.

He was ordained a priest on 24 January 1981 in Genoa Sampierdarena, Italy, by Bishop Rosalio José Castillo Lara.

He was director of the Salesian community in Genoa Sampierdarena from 1997 to 2002, provincial of the Ligurian-Tuscan Salesian Province from 2002 to 2008, president of the Italian Federation of Male Institutes of Consecrated Life in 2005, and Inspector of the Salesian Province of Central Italy from 2008 to 2012. He was Provincial Superior of the Salesian Province in Chile from 1 March 2012 to 27 January 2018, when he became director of the Salesian Community in the Vatican and chaplain of the Directorate of Security Services and Civil Protection of the Vatican City State.

While leading the Salesians in Chile in 2013, he pledged cooperation with civil authorities when they charged Salesian Fr. Audín Araya Alarcón with sexual abuse. (Note: His predecessor as provincial had given similar assurances at an earlier stage of the case. Araya was found guilty in January 2014.)

On 22 May 2019, Pope Francis named him titular bishop of Diocese of Sesta and auxiliary bishop of Santiago, Chile. He and Carlos Eugenio Irarrázaval Errázuriz, also named an auxiliary of Santiago that day, were the first bishops appointed in Chile following the Rome conference at which all of Chile's bishops submitted their resignations in May 2018 and the first since the March 2019 appointment of an apostolic administrator to lead the Archdiocese. On 14 June 2019, The Archdiocese of Santiago announced that Pope Francis accepted Irarrázaval"s resignation from that appointment after he suggested there is a reason why the Last Supper had no women, thus making Lorenzelli the first Chilean Catholic Bishop to be installed since 2018.

Lorenzelli received his episcopal consecration on 22 June 2019 from Pope Francis himself in the Vatican's Saint Peter's Bascilica, with Cardinal Tarcisio Bertone and Bishop Celestino Aós Braco serving as the co-consecrators.
