= Francisco González de Salcedo Castro =

Spanish Roman Catholic prelate

Most Reverend Francisco González de Salcedo Castro
- Bishop of Santiago de Chile
- Church: Catholic Church
- Diocese: Diocese of Santiago de Chile
- In office: 1622–1634
- Predecessor: Juan Pérez de Espinosa
- Successor: Gaspar de Villarroel

Orders
- Consecration: 1623 by Jerónimo Tiedra Méndez

Personal details
- Born: 1559 Ciudad Real, Spain
- Died: 10 August 1634 (aged 74–75) Santiago de Chile

Francisco González de Salcedo Castro (1559–1634) was a Roman Catholic prelate who served as Bishop of Santiago de Chile (1622–1634).

== Biography ==
Francisco González de Salcedo Castro was born in Ciudad Real, Spain in 1559. On 11 Jul 1622, he was appointed during the papacy of Pope Gregory XV as Bishop of Santiago de Chile. In 1623, he was consecrated bishop by Jerónimo Tiedra Méndez, Archbishop of La Plata o Charcas. He served as Bishop of Santiago de Chile until his death on 10 Aug 1634.

Catholic Church titles
Preceded by Juan Pérez de Espinosa	Bishop of Santiago de Chile; 1622–1634	Succeeded by Gaspar de Villarroel
