= Basílica del Salvador =

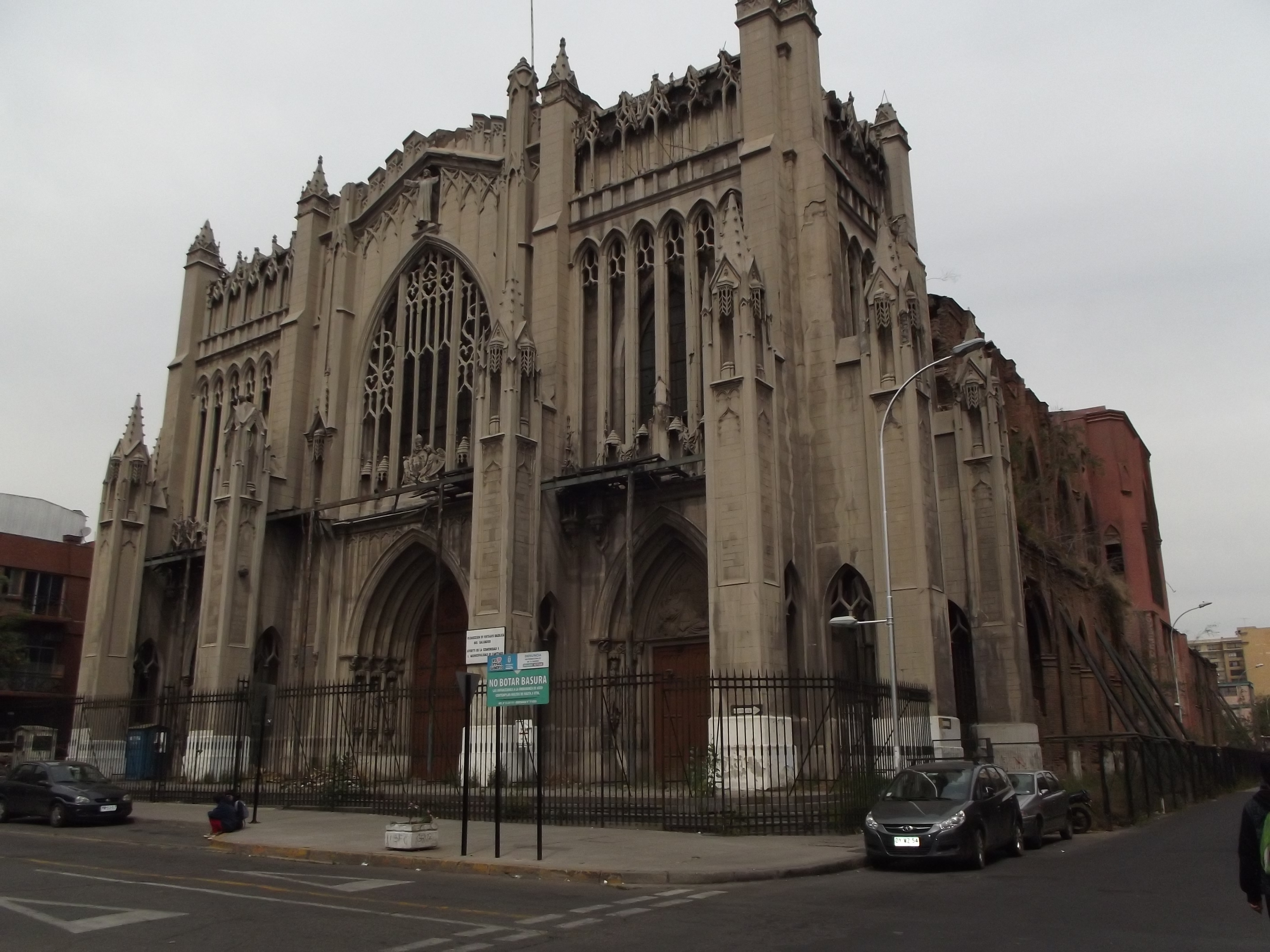

- 33.4413°S 70.661794°W
- Location: Huérfanos Street & Almirante Barroso Street; Santiago, Chile
- Country: Chile
- Denomination: Roman Catholic

History
- Status: Minor basilica
- Consecrated: 1900

Architecture
- Functional status: "Inactive"
- Architect: Teodoro Burchard
- Style: Neo Gothic
- Completed: 1932

Specifications
- Capacity: 5000
- Materials: Brick

Administration
- Diocese: Archdiocese of Santiago

The Basílica del Salvador is a basilica located at the corner of Huérfanos Street and Almirante Barroso Street in the Barrio Brasil of Santiago de Chile. The basilica was designed by the German architect Teodoro Burchard in the Neo Gothic style. It was renovated by Josué Smith Solar in 1932.

Two earthquakes, one in 1985 and the other in 2010, badly damaged the basilica.
