= Pedro de Azuaga =

Spanish Roman Catholic prelate

Most Reverend Pedro de Azuaga
- Bishop-Elect of Santiago de Chile
- Church: Catholic Church
- Diocese: Diocese of Santiago de Chile
- In office: 1596–1597
- Predecessor: Diego de Medellín
- Successor: Juan Pérez de Espinosa

Personal details
- Born: 1539 Azuaga, Spain
- Died: November 1597 (age 58) Santiago de Chile

Pedro de Azuaga, O.F.M. (1539 – November 1597) was a Roman Catholic prelate who was Bishop-Elect of Santiago de Chile (1596–1597).

He was born in Azuaga, Spain in 1539 and ordained a priest in the Order of Friars Minor. On 29 January 1596, he was appointed during the papacy of Pope Clement VIII as Bishop of Santiago de Chile. Azuaga died before he was consecrated bishop in November 1597.

Catholic Church titles
Preceded by Diego de Medellín	Bishop-Elect of Santiago de Chile; 1596–1597	Succeeded by Juan Pérez de Espinosa
