= Diego de Medellín =

Spanish Roman Catholic prelate

Most Reverend Diego de Medellín
- Bishop of Santiago de Chile
- Church: Catholic Church
- Diocese: Diocese of Santiago de Chile
- In office: 1574–1592
- Predecessor: Fernando de Barrionuevo
- Successor: Pedro de Azuaga

Orders
- Consecration: 1577 by Antonio Avendaño y Paz

Personal details
- Born: 1496 Medellín, Spain
- Died: November 1592 (age 96) Santiago de Chile

Diego de Medellín, O.F.M. (1496 – November 1592) was a Roman Catholic prelate who served as Bishop of Santiago de Chile (1574–1592).

== Biography ==
Diego de Medellín was born in Medellín, Spain in 1496 and ordained a priest in the Order of Friars Minor. On 18 June 1574, he was appointed during the papacy of Pope Gregory XIII as Bishop of Santiago de Chile. In 1577, he was consecrated bishop by Antonio Avendaño y Paz, Bishop of Concepción, assisted by Agustín de Cisneros Montesa, Priest of Concepción. He served as Bishop of Santiago de Chile until his death in November 1592. While bishop, he was the principal consecrator of Agustín de Cisneros Montesa, Bishop of Concepción (1590); and the principal co-consecrator of Alfonso Guerra, Bishop of Paraguay (1582)

Catholic Church titles
Preceded by Fernando de Barrionuevo	Bishop of Santiago de Chile; 1574–1592	Succeeded by Pedro de Azuaga
