= Diocese of Melipilla =

Catholic ecclesiastical territory

Diocese of Melipilla Dioecesis Melipillensis Diócesis de Melipilla

Catholic

Location
- Country: Chile
- Ecclesiastical province: Santiago de Chile

Statistics
- Area: 6,217 km^{2} (2,400 sq mi)
- Population: Total; Catholics: (as of 2004); 482,462; 385,970 (80.0%)

Information
- Sui iuris church: Latin Church
- Rite: Roman Rite
- Established: 4 April 1991 (35 years ago)
- Cathedral: Cathedral of St Joseph in Melipilla
- Patron saint: Saint Joseph

Current leadership
- Pope: Leo XIV
- Bishop: Cristián Contreras Villarroel

Website
- www.iglesiademelipilla.cl

The Roman Catholic Diocese of Melipilla (Latin: Melipillen(sis)) is a diocese located in the city of Melipilla in the ecclesiastical province of Santiago de Chile in Chile.

== History ==
- 4 April 1991: Established as Diocese of Melipilla from the Metropolitan Archdiocese of Santiago de Chile

== Bishops ==
- Bishops of Melipilla (Latin Church), in reverse chronological order
  - Bishop Cristián Contreras Villarroel (2014.03.07 – present)
  - Bishop Enrique Troncoso Troncoso (2000.05.28 – 2014.03.07)
  - Bishop Pablo Lizama Riquelme (1991.04.04 – 1999.01.04), appointed Bishop of Chile, Military; future Archbishop

=== Other priest of this diocese who became bishop ===
- Guillermo Patricio Vera Soto, appointed Prelate of Calama in 2003

== Sources ==
- GCatholic.org
- Catholic Hierarchy
- Diocese website
