= Fernando de Barrionuevo =

Bishop of Santiago de Chile from 1566 to 1571

Most Reverend Fernando de Barrionuevo
- Bishop of Santiago de Chile
- Church: Catholic Church
- Diocese: Diocese of Santiago de Chile
- In office: 1566–1571
- Predecessor: Rodrigo González de Marmolejo
- Successor: Diego de Medellín

Orders
- Consecration: Dec 1569

Personal details
- Died: 1571 Santiago de Chile

Fernando de Barrionuevo, O.F.M. (died 1571) was a Roman Catholic prelate who served as Bishop of Santiago de Chile (1566–1571).

== Biography ==
Fernando de Barrionuevo was ordained a priest in the Order of Friars Minor. On 11 Nov 1566, he was appointed during the papacy of Pope Pius V as Bishop of Santiago de Chile. In Dec 1569, he was consecrated bishop. He served as Bishop of Santiago de Chile until his death on 26 Jul 1571.

Catholic Church titles
Preceded by Rodrigo González de Marmolejo	Bishop of Santiago de Chile; 1566–1571	Succeeded by Diego de Medellín
