= Huérfanos Street =

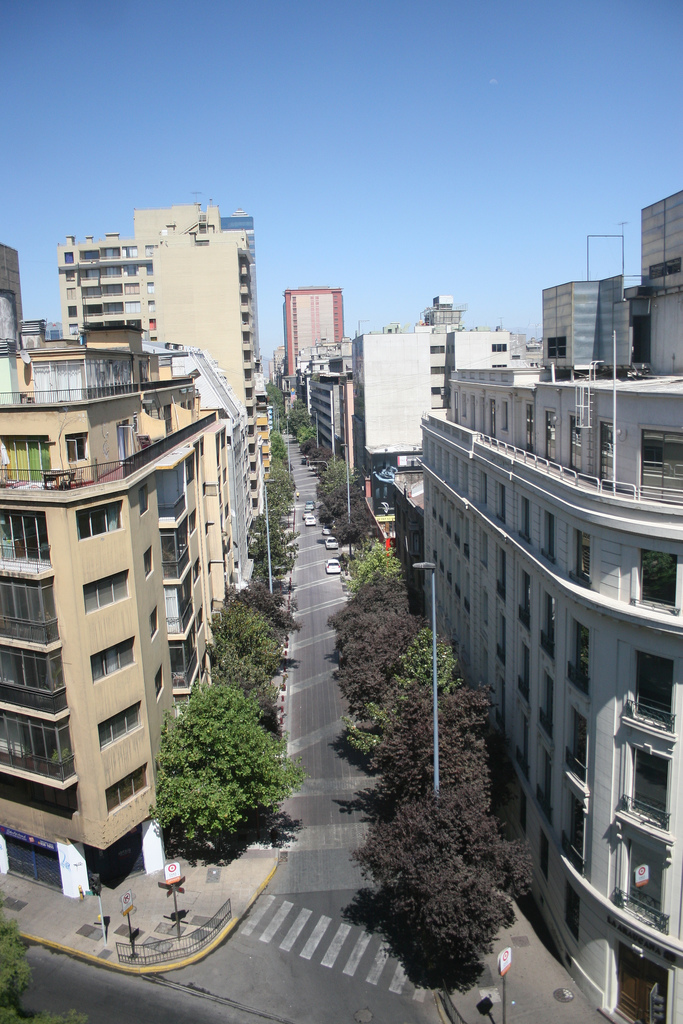
The street as seen from Santa Lucía Hill

Huérfanos Street is an east-west street in downtown Santiago, Chile. The word huérfanos is Spanish for orphans and the street is so named because an orphanage that was built here in 1758.

== Description ==
Huérfanos Street's eastern end originates west of Santa Lucía Hill. The segment between Mac Iver and Teatinos streets is pedestrianized. Many banks, stores and cinemas operate on this segment. It is also home to the headquarters of Codelco and the Constitutional Court of Chile, which occupies the Ex Caja de Crédito Hipotecario building. At the center of this segment, Huérfanos and Paseo Ahumada form a busy pedestrian intersection.

Palacio Pereira is located at the corner of Huérfanos and San Martín Street. A block west of the palace, the street is interrupted by the east branch of the Autopista Central, however a cable-stayed footbridge gives to Huérfanos some level of continuity.

Going westward, the street is first part of the Barrio Brasil and then part of the Barrio Yungay. At the southeastern corner of Huérfanos and Almirante Barroso Street is the Basílica del Salvador. From Brasil Avenue to Maturana Street, Huérfanos borders Plaza Brasil.

Many blocks west of Brasil Avenue, Huérfanos marks the southern border of some quaint streets and alleys. A skyway that is part of the San Juan de Dios Hospital passes over the street before being interrupted by the Quinta Normal Park.
