= Crescente Errázuriz =

Chilean prelate of the Catholic Church (1839–1931)

- Archbishop of Santiago de Chile
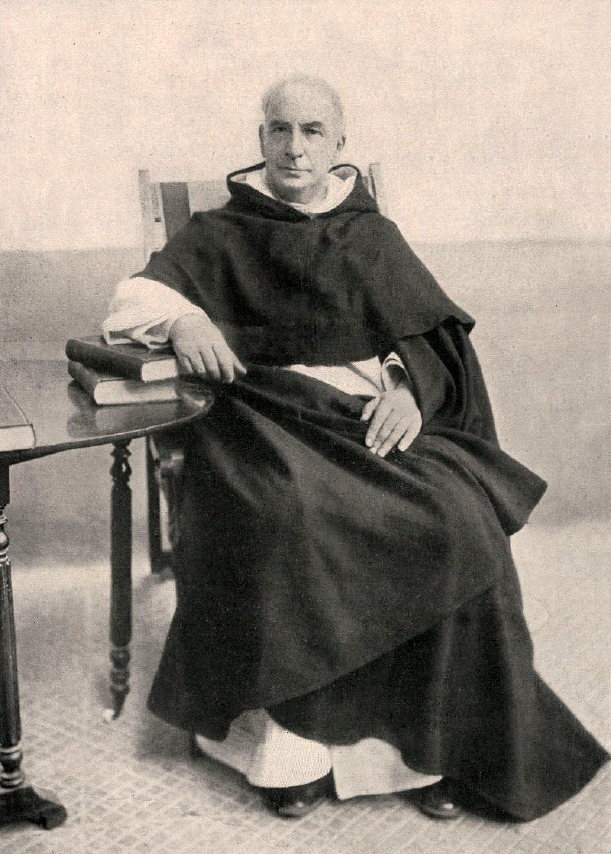
- Monsignor Crescente Errázuriz Valdivieso
- Church: Catholic Church
- Archdiocese: Archdiocese of Santiago de Chile
- In office: 30 December 1918 – 5 June 1931
- Predecessor: Juan Ignacio González Eyzaguirre
- Successor: Horacio Campillo

Orders
- Ordination: 18 December 1863 by Rafael Valentín Valdivieso
- Consecration: 12 January 1919 by José Hilarión de Etura y Cevallos

Personal details
- Born: Crescente José de los Dolores de María Santísima de la Cruz Nepomuceno Errázuriz Valdivieso; 28 November 1839 Santiago, Chile
- Died: 5 June 1931 (aged 91)

Monsignor Crescente Errázuriz Valdivieso (18 November 1839 – 5 June 1931) was a Chilean Dominican friar and prelate of the Catholic Church who served as the archbishop of Santiago de Chile from 1919 to his death in 1931. He was also a professor, writer and historian. Crescente Errázuriz was of Basque descent.

== Life ==
He was born in Santiago, Chile the sixth child of Francisco Javier de Errázuriz y Aldunate and of his second wife, Rosario Fernández de Valdivieso y Zañartu (sister to Archbishop Rafael Valentín Valdivieso.) He studied at the school of the Fernández Díaz sisters and the Justino Fagalde school, in Santiago and from there he attended the Santiago Seminary in 1851. He graduated in theology and law. Subsequently, he decided to embrace the ecclesiastical career. He became a priest on 18 December 1863, and was appointed editor of La Revista Católica (Catholic Magazine). In 1874 founded a new magazine called El Estandarte Católico (Catholic Banner) in order to defend the church position and respond to the liberal attacks. One year earlier, he had also become a member of the Faculty of Theology of the University of Chile, teaching canon law, and writing the standard text on the subject.

In 1885, he left the university to seclude himself in the Recoleta Domínica convent, adopting the name of Raimundo. There he was put in charge of the library, which he transformed in the most important private library in Chile. In 1898, he became the convent abbot, position he retained until 1907. During his time in the convent, he published his massive Los Orígenes de la Iglesia Chilena (Origins of the Chilean church), which made him the premier church historian. Due to his publications and research, he was incorporated to the Royal Academy of the Spanish Language. He was also given the gold medal of the Historical and Geographical Society of Chile in 1912 and became the president of the Chilean Academy of History in 1914. In 1916, he returned to his position in the university.

In 1918 he was nominated as archbishop of the Santiago archdiocese by president Juan Luis Sanfuentes. Monsignor Errázuriz was considered a peace offering in preparation for the heated presidential campaign of 1920, even though he was already 71 years old. Pope Benedict XV named him on 30 December 1918, adopting the motto: Cruz et Evangelium ecce arma mea (Latin for 'The Cross and the Gospel are my weapons').

He promoted a policy to make the Catholic Church independent from the conservative party. In 1920 he proposed the creation of the bishoprics of Valparaíso and Talca. In 1924 he presided over the separation of the church and the state, consecrated in the Constitution of 1925. He was the voice that gave serenity and long-term vision to the negotiations. Monsignor Errázuriz died in 1931 at the age of 91.

Ecclesiastical life of Crescente Errázuriz
Date	Event	Title
28 November 1839	Born	Santiago, Chile
18 December 1863	Ordained Priest	Priest of Order of Friars Preachers
1910	Incardinated	Priest of Santiago de Chile
30 December 1918	Appointed	Archbishop of Santiago de Chile
12 January 1919	Ordained Bishop	Archbishop of Santiago de Chile
29 January 1919	Installed	Archbishop of Santiago de Chile
5 June 1931	Died	Archbishop of Santiago de Chile

== See also ==
- Maximiano Errázuriz Valdivieso
- History of Chile
