= Basílica del Corazón de María (Santiago de Chile) =

National monument of Chile

Coordinates: 33°27′19″S 70°39′04″W

Basilica of the Heart of Mary
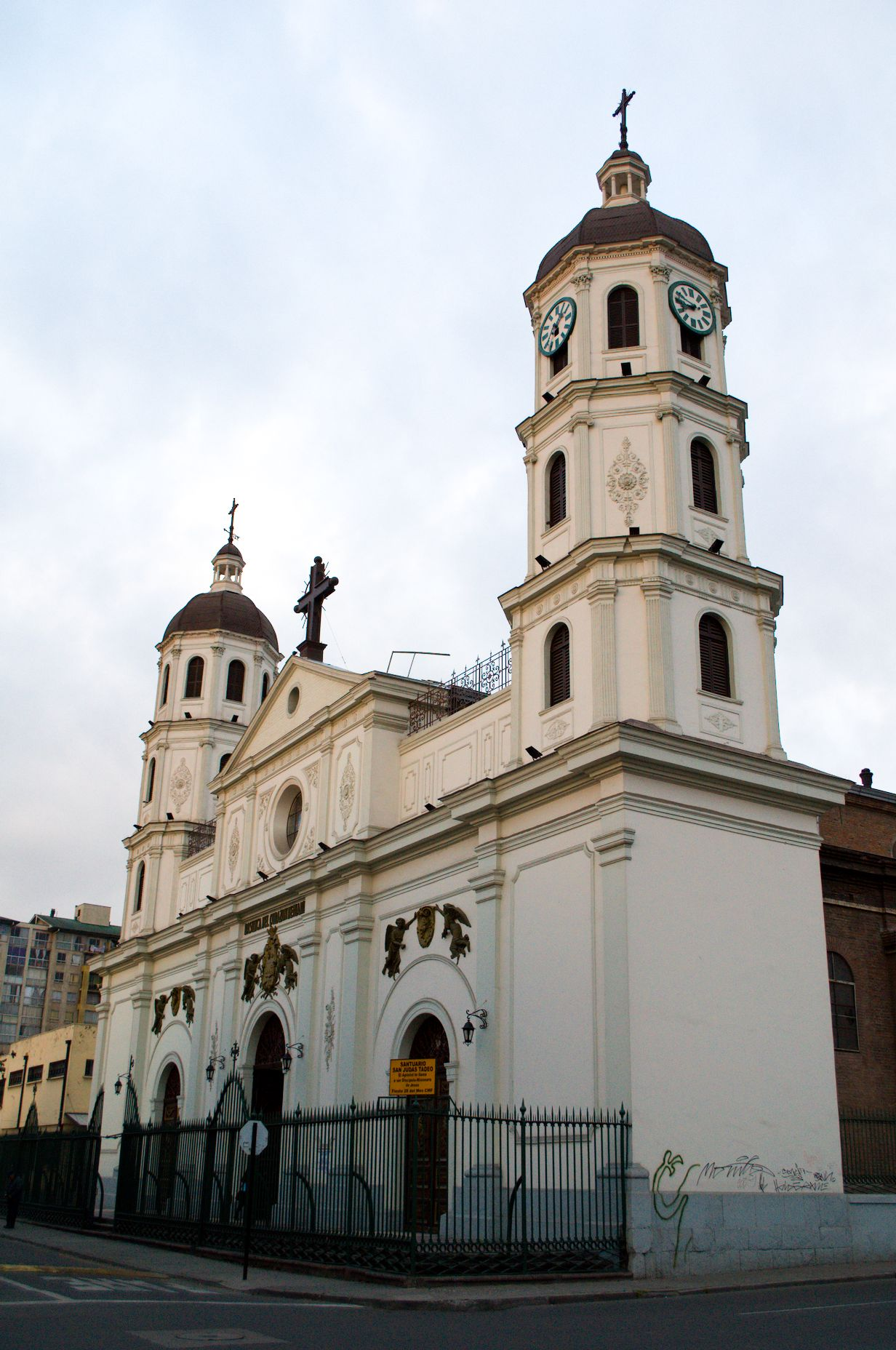

Religion
- Affiliation: Roman Catholic
- Ecclesiastical or organizational status: Minor Basilica

Location
- Municipality: Santiago
- Country: Chile
- Interactive map of Basilica of the Heart of Mary

Architecture
- Architect: José Viladrich
- Groundbreaking: 1876
- Completed: 1882

The Basilica of the Heart of Mary is a Catholic Church in the city of Santiago, Chile. Built by the Claretians, it was inaugurated on 7 December 1879, being designated as a basilica in 1929 and as a National Monument of Chile on 14 January 1987.

== History ==
In 1870, after the Glorious Revolution in Spain, the Claretians arrived to Chile, housed themselves in a chapel of Calle Dieciocho in Santiago downtown. Two years after the congregation bought a land lot at the corner of Zenteno and Copiapó Streets. Adjacent land lots were bought or received as a donation, installing a chapel in the resultant merged site.

Construction of the church building started on 5 March 1876 on the chosen site, to a design of the architect and Claretian priest José Viladrich, and under the supervision of the priest Pedro Más. The church was inaugurated and consecrated to the Immaculate Heart of Mary on 7 December 1879 by the Bishop Joaquín Larraín Gandarillas. However, the construction of the church building was completed in 1882.

By 1910, Elena Correa, a woman with devotion to Saint Jude Thaddeus, along with a Claretian priest, agreed the acquisition of a figure of that saint in Spain, which arrived the following year. The artwork was placed in an altar that was donated to the congregation and that belonged to the chapel of the Congregation of the Oratory of Saint Philip Neri in Santiago, which had left the city. The first novena to Saint Jude Thaddeus was offered in 1922.

The church was established as a parish church of the Heart of Mary in 1928, and a year after it was elevated to basilica status by Pope Pius XI.

The basilica suffered heavy structural damage as a consequence of the 2010 Chile earthquake. It was repaired in approximately two years, being reopened on 18 March 2012 by the Archbishop Ricardo Ezzati.

== Description ==
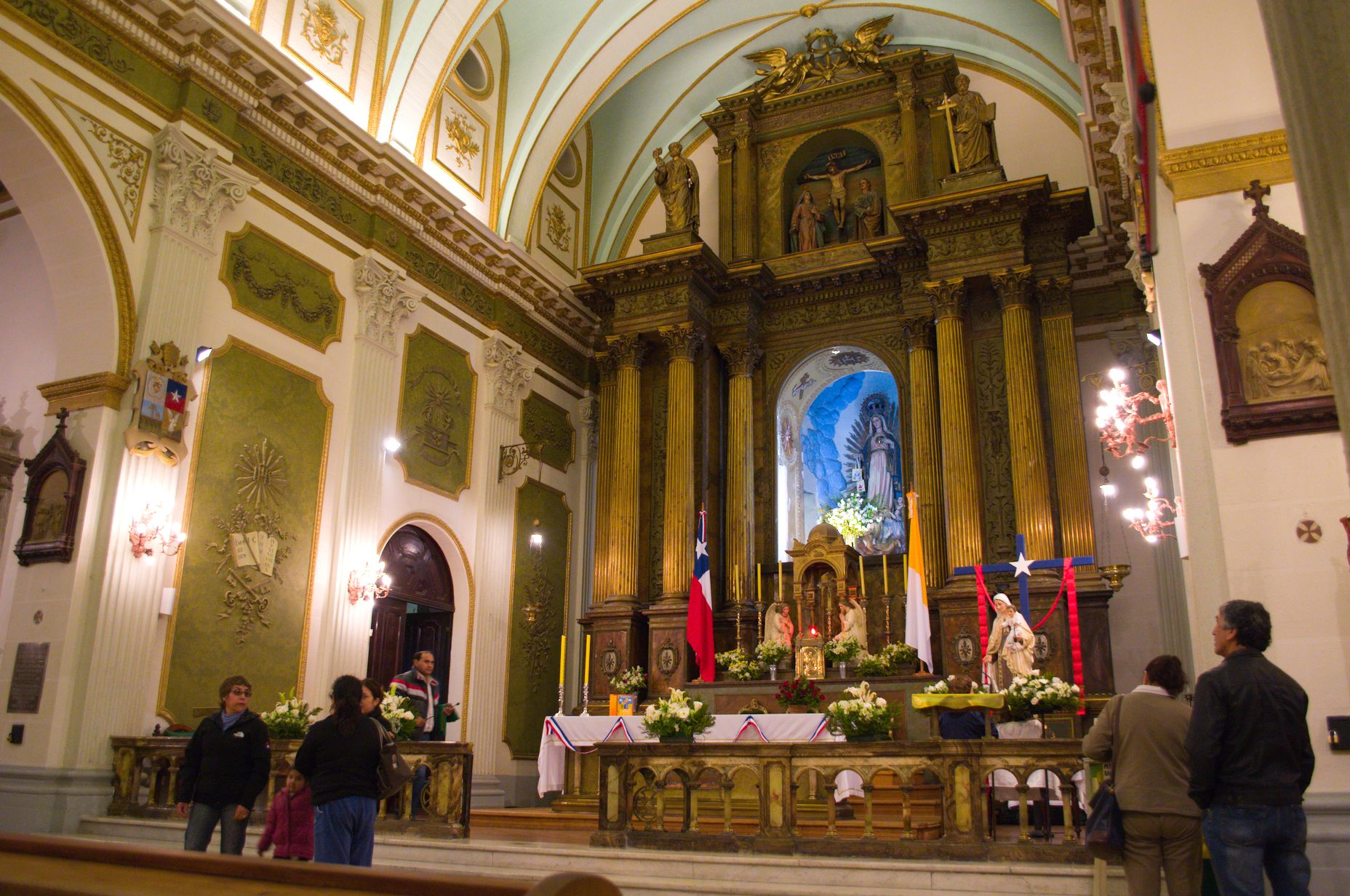
High altar of the basilica

The design of the church consists of one nave and two side aisles separated by semi-circular arcades. Its symmetrical facade has two twin towers, one on each corner. The portion of the towers over the entablature have octagonal bases and both are bell towers. The walls of the basilica was built in clay brick masonry and lime mortar.

Its high altar contains the 3.7-m-high imagen titular of the Heart of Mary, which was carved in wood in Spain and was installed in 1898. It was crowned by the cardinal José María Caro on 3 September 1950.
