= Francisco de la Puebla González =

Most Reverend Francisco de la Puebla González
- Bishop of Santiago de Chile
- Church: Catholic Church
- Diocese: Diocese of Santiago de Chile
- In office: 1694–1704
- Predecessor: Bernardo de Carrasco y Saavedra
- Successor: Luis Francisco Romero

Orders
- Ordination: 17 Dec 1667
- Consecration: 29 Jul 1695

Personal details
- Born: 9 Jun 1643 Pradera de Sepulveda, Spain
- Died: 21 Jan 1704 (age 60) Santiago de Chile

Francisco de la Puebla González (1643–1704) was a Roman Catholic prelate who served as Bishop of Santiago de Chile (1694–1704).

== Biography ==
Francisco de la Puebla González was born in Pradera de Sepulveda, Spain on 9 Jun 1643 and ordained a priest on 17 Dec 1667. On 8 Nov 1694, he was appointed during the papacy of Pope Innocent XII as Bishop of Santiago de Chile. On 29 Jul 1695, he was consecrated bishop. He served as Bishop of Santiago de Chile until his death on 21 Jan 1704. While bishop, he was the principal co-consecrator of Julián Cano y Tevar, Bishop of Urgell (1695); and Tomás Reluz, Bishop of Oviedo (1697).

Catholic Church titles
Preceded by Bernardo de Carrasco y Saavedra	Bishop of Santiago de Chile; 1694–1704	Succeeded by Luis Francisco Romero
