= Edificio de la ex Caja de Crédito Hipotecario =

Coordinates: 33°26′25″S 70°39′15″W

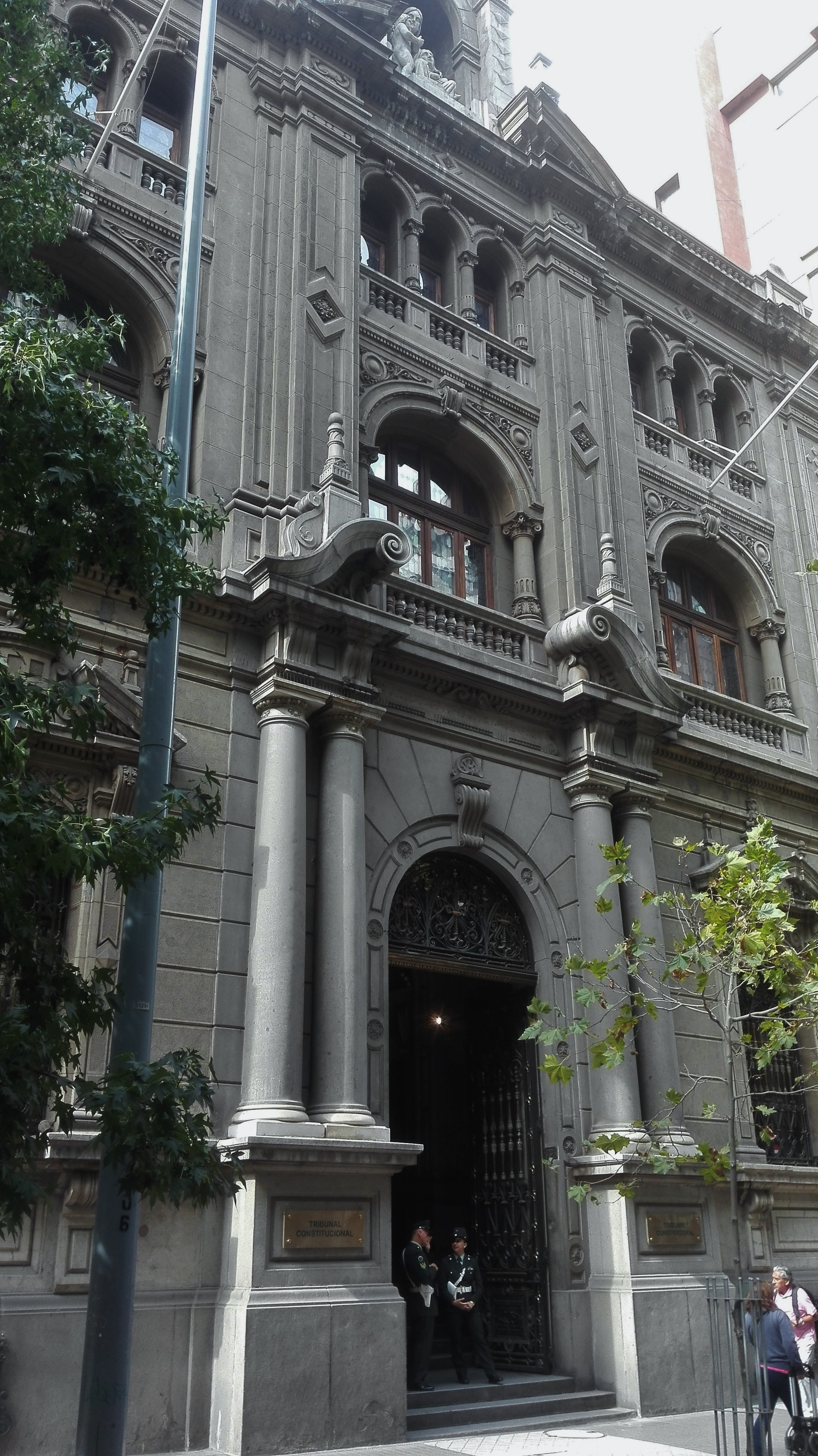
- Interactive map of Edificio de la ex Caja de Crédito Hipotecario

Design and construction
- Architect: Ricardo Larraín Bravo

The edificio de la ex Caja de Crédito Hipotecario is a building located at 1234 Huérfanos Street, in downtown Santiago, Chile. Designed by architect Ricardo Larraín Bravo, it was built between 1915 and 1920 for the Caja de Crédito Hipotecario, and as of 2016, it serves as the seat of the Tribunal Constitucional.

The building was declared a National Monument of Chile in 2018.

== History ==
The building was built on the site of the former home of the García Huidobro family, which was demolished in 1913 to make way for the new building. It was inaugurated in 1926. The building was occupied by the Caja de Crédito Hipotecario until 1933, when it changed hands to the Instituto de Crédito Industrial.

When the Banco del Estado de Chile was created in 1953, the building went on to form part of the new institution, but it was used by the Dirección del Registro Electoral, and by the División de Reclutamiento Militar. In 1977 the Banco del Estado decided to sell the property to the Banco Hipotecario y de Fomento Nacional to serve as its headquarters.

Since 2016 the building houses the Tribunal Constitucional.
