= Constitutional Court of Chile =

National constitutional ruling body of Chile

The Constitutional Court of Chile (Tribunal Constitucional de Chile in Spanish) is Chile's constitutional tribunal. It is not part of the judicial branch and is functionally independent of the Congress and the President. The court is housed in the Ex Caja de Crédito Hipotecario building, which is located at 1234 Huérfanos Street in downtown Santiago.

== History ==
The Constitutional Court was created in 1970, under the Constitution of 1925. In 1973, after the coup d'état, it was dissolved, but the 1980 Constitution reinstated it.

Until 2005, some members were designated by the National Security Council (a civic-military committee).

== Attributions ==
According to the Chilean constitution, its principal attribution is to rule on whether laws that are challenged are in fact unconstitutional, i.e., whether they conflict with constitutionally established rights and freedoms. This function not only applies to legislative acts, but also to judicial decrees (autoacordados), presidential decrees (Decretos con Fuerza de Ley), or even ordinary decrees when the Comptroller-General deems it to be unconstitutional.

Also, the Court has attributions on the convocation to referendums, outlawing groups or parties which seriously violate the institutional order, deposing members of Congress who seriously infringe the constitution, resolving conflicts between lower courts and administrative agencies, and many others.

== Ministers ==
The Constitutional Court is composed of ten members, called Ministers:

- 3 appointed by the President of the Republic
- 3 elected by the Supreme Court
- 2 elected by the Senate by a two-thirds majority
- 2 proposed by the Chamber of Deputies by a two-thirds majority and confirmed by the Senate by the same margin

Members have nine-year terms, renewed by thirds every three years, and can not be re-elected.

The Constitutional Court can work as a United Court (Pleno) or divided in two Chambers (Salas).

In the event a quorum is below the legally required, deputy ministers (ministros suplentes), or substitute attorneys (abogados integrantes) are designated.

The court's president has the power to break a tie.
