= Rodrigo González de Marmolejo =

Chilean Roman Catholic bishop

Most Reverend Rodrigo González de Marmolejo
- Bishop-Elect of Santiago de Chile
- Church: Catholic Church
- Diocese: Diocese of Santiago de Chile
- In office: 1561–1564
- Predecessor: None
- Successor: Fernando de Barrionuevo

Orders
- Ordination: 1536

Personal details
- Born: 1487 Carmona, Spain
- Died: 9 Oct 1564 (age 77) Santiago de Chile

Rodrigo González de Marmolejo (1487–1564) was a Roman Catholic prelate who was appointed as the first Bishop of Santiago de Chile (1561–1564).

== Biography ==
Rodrigo González de Marmolejo was born in Carmona, Spain in 1487 and ordained a priest in 1536. On 27 Jun 1561, he was appointed during the papacy of Pope Pius IV as Bishop of Santiago de Chile. He died before he was consecrated bishop on 9 Oct 1564.

Catholic Church titles
Preceded by None	Bishop Elect of Santiago de Chile; 1561–1564	Succeeded by Fernando de Barrionuevo
