= Marco Antonio Órdenes Fernández =

Chilean priest

- Church: Roman Catholic Church
- Diocese: Diocese of Iquique
- Appointed: 23 October 2006
- Term ended: 9 October 2012
- Predecessor: Juan Barros Madrid
- Successor: Guillermo Patricio Vera Soto

Orders
- Ordination: 14 December 1996
- Consecration: 18 November 2006 by Francisco Javier Errázuriz Ossa
- Laicized: 11 October 2018

Personal details
- Born: 29 October 1964 (age 61) Iquique, Chile

Marco Antonio Órdenes Fernández (born 29 October 1964) is a native of Chile and a former prelate of the Catholic Church. He was Bishop of Iquique from 2006 to 2012. When appointed at the age of 42, he was the youngest bishop in the history of Chile. Accusations that he had sexually abused minors forced his resignation in 2012. Civil procedures concluded when prosecutors could not establish a case against him, but church proceedings ended with his removal from the clerical state in 2018.

== Biography ==
Órdenes was born in Iquique on 29 October 1964. After obtaining a degree in obstetrics and childcare at the University of Tarapacá, he entered the Pontifical Major Seminary of Santiago de Chile, where he completed his philosophical and theological studies, earning a bachelor's degree in theology.

On 14 December 1996 he was ordained a priest for the Diocese of Iquique. There he was Rector of the Marian Shrine of "La Tirana", Director of the Lay School of Formation and Diocesan Secretary for the Pastoral Coordination. After Iquique's Bishop Juan Barros Madrid was transferred the Military Ordinariate of Chile, Órdenes became Diocesan Administrator on 17 November 2004.

On 23 October 2006, Pope Benedict XVI named him Bishop of Iquique. When made a bishop at the age of 42 he was the youngest bishop ever appointed in Chile.

He received his episcopal consecration on 18 November from Francisco Javier Errázuriz Ossa. While bishop he supported the reconstruction of churches and parish buildings that were destroyed by the earthquake that hit the Tarapacá Region in June 2005.

On 2 October 2012, Rodrigo Pino charged publicly that Ordenes had repeatedly abused him sexually when he was as young as 15 and an acolyte at the Iquique cathedral. Pino asked only that Ordenes be removed from the priesthood. By then the Apostolic Nuncio to Chile, Archbishop Ivo Scapolo, had conducted a four-month-long church investigation and sent his findings to the Vatican.

On 3 October Scapolo asked Ordenes to resign and to avoid publicity while his case was reviewed. Instead Ordenes gave a newspaper interview that appeared three days later. He said that whatever he did with Pino he had done nothing "not with a minor" (no con un menor de edad). On 8 October 2012, Órdenes submitted his resignation as Bishop of Iquique citing health problems and Pope Benedict XVI accepted it the next day. (Note: The Archbishop of Antofagasta, Pablo Lizama Riquelme served as Apostolic Administrator of Iquique from 9 October 2012 until Guillermo Vera Soto, named Bishop of Iquique on 22 February 2014, was installed there on 29 March.) Órdenes was not seen in public in Iquique on 14 November 2013 when he presided at his mother's funeral in the La Tirana shrine. As of 2018, he was reported to be living "a life of penitence and prayer" in Peru.

On 26 January 2018, civil prosecutors dismissed their case against Ordenes after determining they could not verify the charges against him. Ordenes never complied with a subpoena requiring him to submit to questioning.

On 11 October 2018, Pope Francis laicized Órdenes "as a consequence manifest abuse of minors". He is no longer a priest and cannot appeal that decision.

== See also ==
- Catholic Church in Chile
