= Diocese of Iquique =

Catholic ecclesiastical territory

Coordinates: 20.2118°S 70.1501°W

Diocese of Iquique Dioecesis Iquiquensis Diócesis de Iquique

Catholic

Location
- Country: Chile
- Ecclesiastical province: Antofagasta
- Metropolitan: Antofagasta

Statistics
- Area: 41,799 km^{2} (16,139 sq mi)
- Population: Total; Catholics: (as of 2006); 238,000; 124,447 (52.3%)

Information
- Sui iuris church: Latin Church
- Rite: Roman Rite
- Established: 1880 (145–146 years ago)
- Cathedral: Cathedral of the Immaculate Conception in Iquique
- Patron saint: Immaculate Conception

Current leadership
- Pope: Leo XIV
- Bishop: Isauro Ilises Covili Linfati, O.F.M.
- Metropolitan Archbishop: Ignacio Francisco Ducasse Medina

Website
- www.iglesiadeiquique.cl

The Roman Catholic Diocese of Iquique (Latin: Iquiquen(sis)) is a diocese located in the city of Iquique, Chile, in the ecclesiastical province of Antofagasta.

== History ==
- 1880: Established as Apostolic Vicariate of Tarapacá from the Diocese of Arequipa in Peru
- 20 December 1929: Promoted as Diocese of Iquique
- 11 October 2018: Bishop emeritus Marco Antonio Órdenes Fernández was laicized by Pope Francis for sexual abuse of minors, a decision that cannot be appealed.

== Bishops ==
- Vicars Apostolic of Tarapacá
  - Bishop Plácido Labarca Olivares (1887 – 1890.06.26), appointed Bishop of Concepción
  - Bishop Guillermo Juan Carter Gallo (1895.06.12 – 1906.08.30)
  - Bishop Martín Rucker Sotomayor (Apostolic Administrator 1906 – 1910)
  - Bishop José María Caro Rodríguez (1911.05.06 – 1925.12.14), appointed Bishop of La Serena; future Cardinal
  - Bishop Carlos Labbé Márquez (1926.08.02 – 1929.12.20)
- Bishops of Iquique
  - Bishop Carlos Labbé Márquez (1929.12.20 – 1941.06.30)
  - Bishop Pedro Aguilera Narbona (1941.09.15 – 1966.11.21)
  - Bishop José del Carmen Valle Gallardo (1966.11.21 – 1984.07.09)
  - Bishop Francisco Javier Prado Aránguiz, SS.CC. (1984.07.09 – 1988.04.28), appointed Auxiliary Bishop of Valparaíso
  - Bishop Enrique Troncoso Troncoso (1989.07.15 – 2000.05.28), appointed Bishop of Melipilla
  - Bishop Juan Barros Madrid (2000.11.21 – 2004.10.09), appointed Bishop of Chile, Military
  - Bishop Marco Antonio Órdenes Fernández (43) (Apostolic Administrator 2004.11.17 – 2006.10.23)
  - Bishop Marco Antonio Órdenes Fernández (2006.10.23 – 2012.10.09)
  - Bishop Guillermo Patricio Vera Soto (2014.02.22 – 2021.06.08), appointed Bishop of Rancagua
  - Bishop Isauro Ilises Covili Linfati, O.F.M. (2022.04.23 – ...)

=== Auxiliary bishop ===
- José del Carmen Valle Gallardo (1963-1966), appointed Bishop here

== Sources ==
- GCatholic.org ^{[self-published]}
- Catholic Hierarchy ^{[self-published]}
- Diocese website
