= Juan Pérez de Espinosa =

Spanish Roman Catholic prelate

Most Reverend Juan Pérez de Espinosa
- Bishop of Santiago de Chile
- Church: Catholic Church
- Diocese: Diocese of Santiago de Chile
- In office: 1600–1622
- Predecessor: Pedro de Azuaga
- Successor: Francisco González de Salcedo Castro

Orders
- Ordination: 10 August 1575
- Consecration: 25 July 1600 by Domenico Ginnasi

Personal details
- Born: 1558 Castilla la Vieja, Spain
- Died: 31 October 1622 (age 64) Santiago de Chile

Juan Pérez de Espinosa, O.F.M. (1558 – 31 October 1622) was a Roman Catholic prelate who served as Bishop of Santiago de Chile (1600–1622).

== Biography ==
Juan Pérez de Espinosa was born in Castilla la Vieja, Spain in 1558 and ordained a priest in the Order of Friars Minor on 10 August 1575. On 12 May 1600, he was appointed during the papacy of Pope Clement VIII as Bishop of Santiago de Chile. On 25 July 1600, he was consecrated bishop by Domenico Ginnasi, Archbishop of Manfredonia, with Juan Pedro González de Mendoza, Bishop Emeritus of Lipari, and Martín Vasquez de Arce, Bishop of Puerto Rico, serving as co-consecrators. He served as Bishop of Santiago de Chile until his death on 31 October 1622.

Catholic Church titles
Preceded by Pedro de Azuaga	Bishop of Santiago de Chile; 1600–1622	Succeeded by Francisco González de Salcedo Castro
