= José Hipólito Salas =

Catholic priest from Chile

- Bishop of Concepción
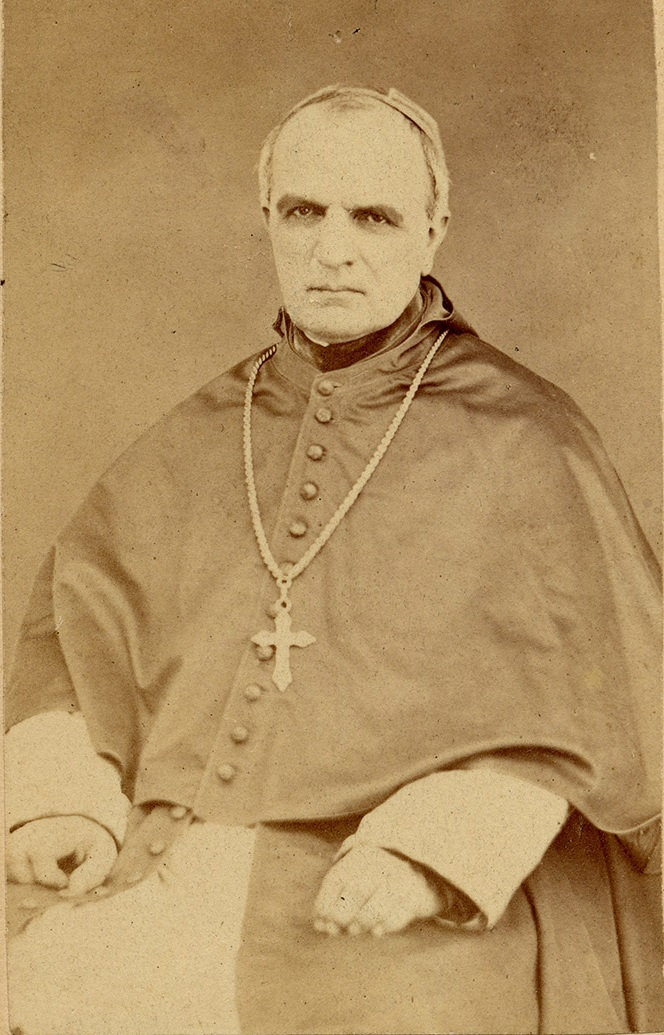
- José Hipólito Salas
- Church: Catholic Church
- Diocese: Diocese of Concepción
- In office: 23 June 1854 – 20 July 1883
- Predecessor: Diego Elizondo Prado
- Successor: Fernando Blaitt Mariño

Orders
- Ordination: 22 November 1835 by Manuel Vicuña Larraín
- Consecration: 29 October 1854 by Rafael Valentín Valdivieso

Personal details
- Born: 13 August 1812 Olivar, Kingdom of Chile
- Died: 20 July 1883 (aged 70)

José Hipólito Salas y Toro (August 13, 1812 – July 20, 1883) was a Chilean Catholic priest and theologian. He served as bishop of Concepción between 1854 and 1883.

== Biography ==
He was born in Olivar, and studied in the Instituto Nacional General José Miguel Carrera in Santiago. Salas was ordained a priest on 22 November 1835. He was professor of the now-extinct Faculty of Theology of the University of Chile.

Salas was candidate for deputy representing Rancagua and Maipo in the parliamentary elections of Chile of 1843, in which finally were elected José Santiago Melo Mendoza and Luis García Huidobro Aldunate.

In 1848 he wrote the essay Memoria sobre el servicio personal de los indígenas y su abolición about encomienda and other subjects.

In October 1854 he was appointed bishop of the then Diocese of Conception, and in next year he ordered the reopening of the Seminar of Concepción. He also managed the construction of the Cathedral of Conception in 1867, that replaced the old church destroyed by the 1835 Concepción earthquake.

He participated of the First Vatican Council (1869–70) convoked by Pope Pius IX, as part of the Chilean group led by monsignor Rafael Valentín Valdivieso. In Vatican he was invited to join the College of Cardinals, however he refused the offer and returned to Chile.

He died in 1883, and his remains lie in the General Cemetery of Concepción.
