= Carlos Labbé Márquez =

Chilean bishop

- Titular Bishop of Leuce
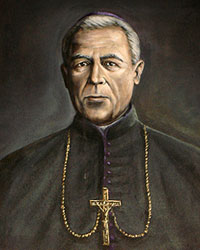
- Carlos Labbé Márquez
- Church: Catholic Church
- Diocese: Titular Diocese of Leuce
- In office: 30 June 1941 – 17 October 1941
- Predecessor: Teodósio de Gouveia
- Successor: Georges Marie Paul Petit
- Other post: Military Vicar of Chile (1941)
- Previous posts: Bishop of Iquique (1929–1941); Apostolic Vicar of Tarapacá (1926–1929); Titular Bishop of Bida (1926–1929)

Orders
- Ordination: 23 December 1899
- Consecration: 21 November 1926 by Benedetto Aloisi Masella

Personal details
- Born: 22 November 1876 Curicó, Chile
- Died: 17 October 1941 (aged 64)

Carlos Labbé Márquez (22 November 1876 – 17 October 1941) was a Chilean bishop.

== Life as a priest ==
He studied at the Seminary of Santiago and was ordained priest on 23 December 1899. He served as pastor in Walls between 1901 and 1906, in Curepto between 1906 and 1911, in Talca between 1911 and 1914, and in Curicó between 1914 and 1923.

He was bishop of Iquique from 1930 to 1941.
