= Diego Elizondo Prado =

Chilean politician

Diego Elizondo
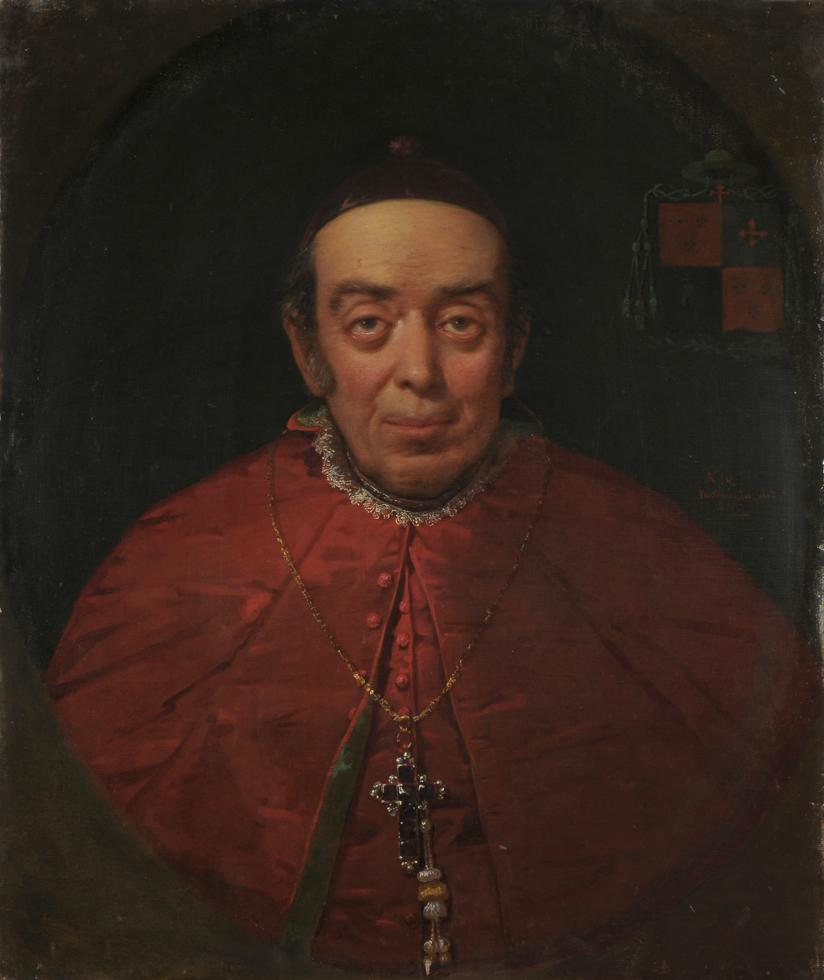

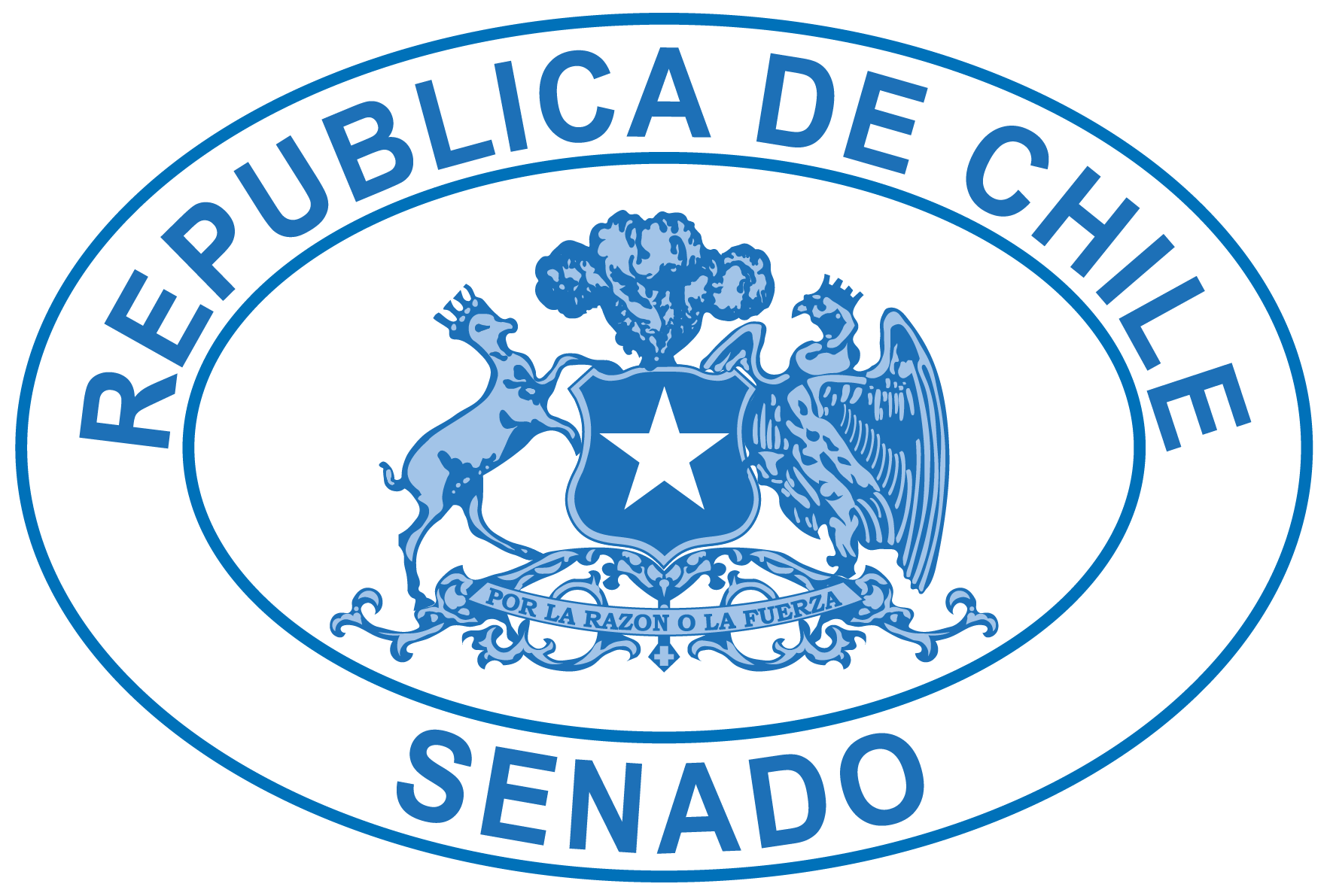
President of the Senate of the Republic of Chile
- In office 1826–1826
- In office 1836–1837

Personal details
- Born: 5 March 1779 Quillota, Captaincy General of Chile, Spanish Empire
- Died: 5 October 1852 (aged 73) Valparaíso, Chile
- Party: Conservative Party (1823–1852)
- Spouse: None
- Children: None
- Occupation: Politician
- Profession: Bishop
Diego Elizondo Prado
- Bishop of Concepción
- Church: Catholic Church
- Diocese: Diocese of Concepción
- In office: 27 April 1840 – 5 October 1852
- Predecessor: José Ignacio Cienfuegos
- Successor: José Hipólito Salas
Orders
- Ordination: 20 March 1802 by Francisco José Marán
- Consecration: 21 February 1841 by José Ignacio Cienfuegos

Diego Antonio de Elizondo Prado (5 March 1779 – 5 October 1852) was a Chilean bishop and politician who served as President of the Senate of Chile.
