= Enrique Troncoso Troncoso =

Chilean Roman Catholic bishop (1937–2018)

- Bishop of Melipilla
- Church: Catholic Church
- Diocese: Diocese of Melipilla
- In office: 28 May 2000 – 7 March 2014
- Predecessor: Pablo Lizama Riquelme
- Successor: Cristián Contreras Villarroel
- Previous post: Bishop of Iquique (1989-2000)

Orders
- Ordination: 23 December 1961 by Raúl Silva Henríquez
- Consecration: 12 August 1989 by Juan Francisco Fresno

Personal details
- Born: 11 November 1937 Alhué, Santiago Province, Chile
- Died: 29 March 2018 (aged 80) Santiago, Chile

Enrique Troncoso Troncoso (11 November 1937 – 29 March 2018) was a Roman Catholic bishop.

Enrique Troncoso Troncoso was born in Chile and was ordained to the priesthood in 1961. He served as bishop of the Roman Catholic Diocese of Iquique, Chile, from 1989 to 2000, then as bishop of the Roman Catholic Diocese of Melipilla, Chile, from 2000 to 2014.
