= Basilica de la Merced =

Basilica in Santiago, Chile

Coordinates: 33°26′18″S 70°38′48″W

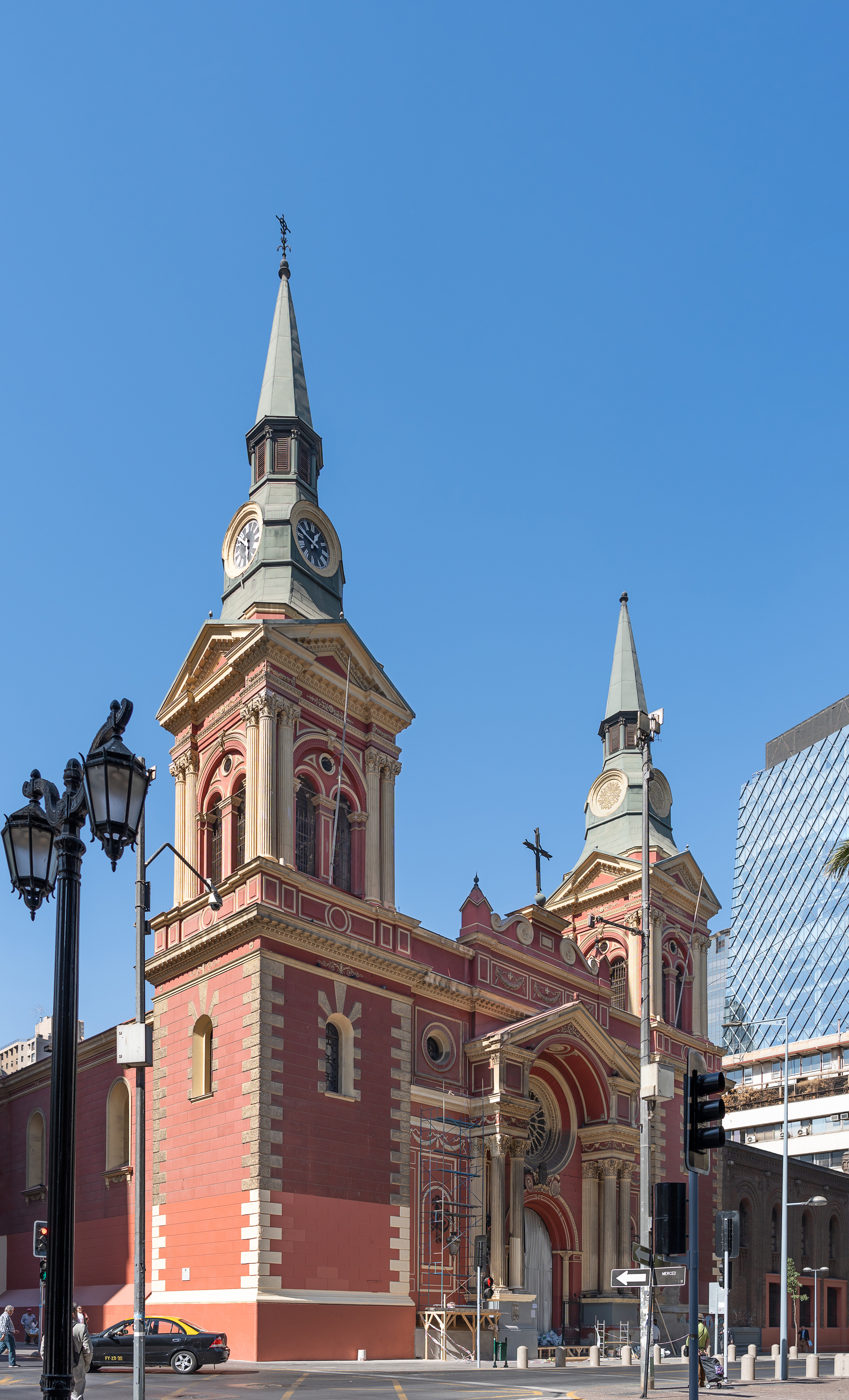
The Bascilica de la Merced

The Basilica de la Merced is a basilica located in Santiago, Chile. It was founded by the Order of the Blessed Virgin Mary of Mercy, has its origin in the third temple of the Basilica of La Merced that was in this site, built in 1760, its first tower was built in 1859 and its second tower in 1885 completing the building. It is a Chilean National Monument.

It is Neo-Renaissance in architecture and has a small museum with religious objects and art, including a collection of pieces from Easter Island. The collection includes a rongorongo tablet, one of 29 left in the world.
