= Gabriel Larraín Valdivieso =

Chilean Catholic bishop

Gabriel Larraín Valdivieso (January 26, 1925 – December 20, 2008) was a Chilean Bishop for the Catholic Church. Larraín Valdivieso was of Basque descent.

== Biography ==
In 1950, Larraín Valdivieso was ordained as a priest at the age of 25. On September 12, 1966 he was appointed as Bishop of Santiago de Chile, Chile. He was also appointed as Titular Bishop of Theudalis. He resigned as Bishop of Santiago de Chile in 1968. He resigned as Titular Bishop in 1975, he was succeeded by Guillermo Leaden, one of the oldest bishops in the Roman Catholic Church.

He died on December 20, 2008.
