= Rafael Valentín Valdivieso =

Chilean priest and lawyer

- Archbishop of Santiago de Chile
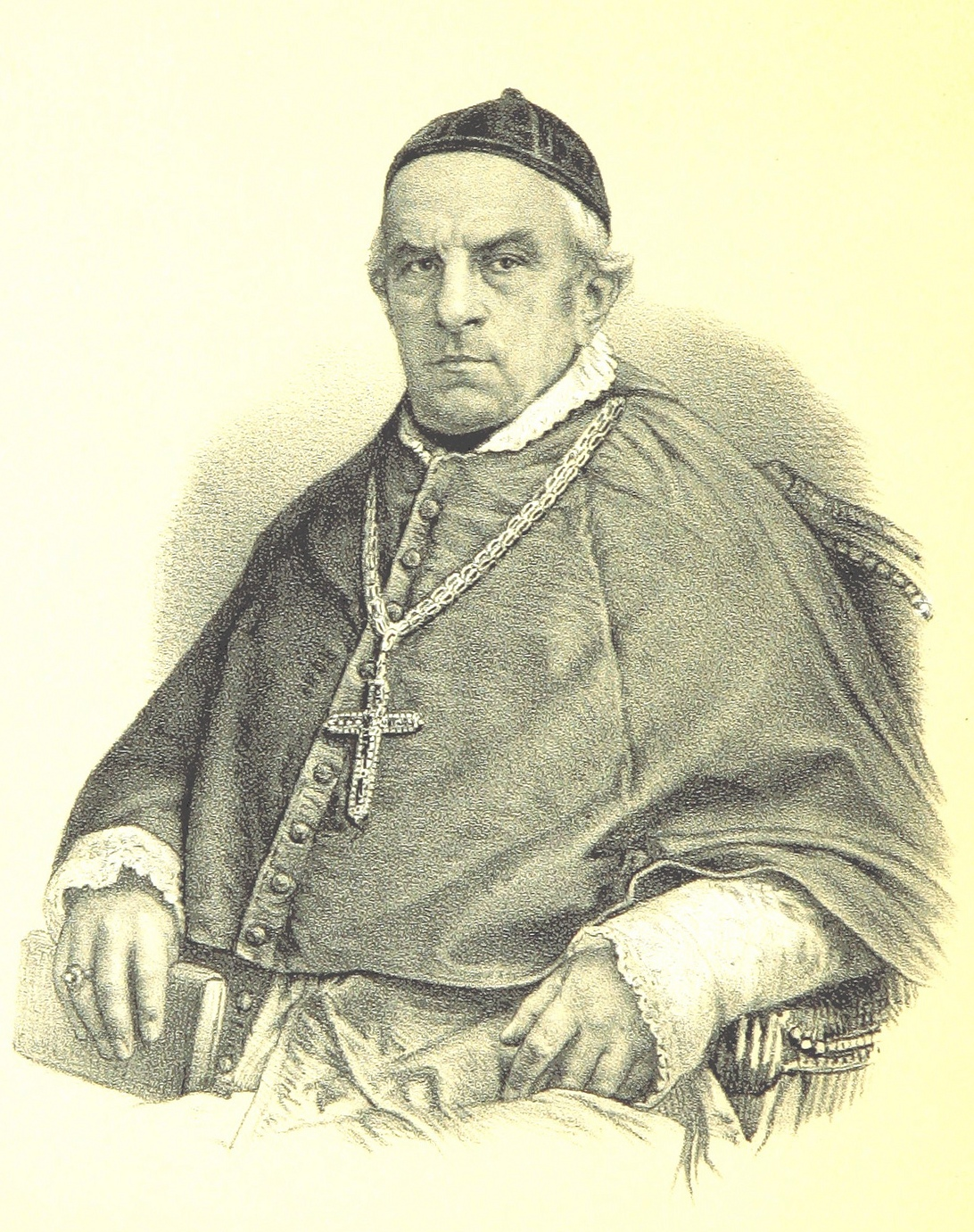
- Rafael Valentín Valdivieso
- Church: Catholic Church
- Archdiocese: Archdiocese of Santiago de Chile
- In office: 4 October 1847 – 8 June 1878
- Predecessor: Manuel Vicuña Larraín
- Successor: Mariano Jaime Casanova Casanova

Orders
- Ordination: 27 July 1834 by Manuel Vicuña Larraín
- Consecration: 2 July 1848 by José Hilarión de Etura y Cevallos

Personal details
- Born: 2 November 1804 Santiago, Captaincy General of Chile, Spanish Empire
- Died: 8 June 1878 (aged 73) Santiago, Republic of Chile

Rafael Valentín Valdivieso Zañartu (2 November 1804 – 8 June 1878) was a Chilean priest and lawyer, who worked as Archbishop of Santiago de Chile between 1848 and 1878.

== Biography ==
Valdivieso was born on 2 November 1804. His parents were Manuel Joaquín Valdivieso and Maciel y de Mercedes Zañartu y Manso de Velasco. He studied law, and he graduated as lawyer on 23 May 1825, in Universidad de San Felipe.

Valdivieso was ordained priest by the Bishop of Santiago Manuel Vicuña Larraín, on 27 July 1834.

Valdivieso worked as a missionary in Chiloé and Atacama Region. He worked as Dean of Theology in University of Chile, and Pius IX designated him Archbishop of Santiago on 4 October 1847.

Valdivieso participated in the First Vatican Council between 1869 and 1870. He was credited by his contemporaries with having greatly reduced corruption among the Chilean clergy. He died on 8 June 1878, and was buried in the Metropolitan Cathedral of Santiago. Mariano Casanova y Casanova succeeded him as Archbishop in 1886.

His slogan was Verum in luce. Bonum in cruce. Virgo in omni patria et in corde.
