= Miguel Caviedes =

Chilean Roman Catholic prelate (1930–2025)

His Excellency Miguel Blas Caviedes Medina
- Bishop Emeritus of Santa María de Los Ángeles
- Archdiocese: Concepción
- Diocese: Santa Maria de Los Ángeles
- Appointed: February 19, 1994
- Term ended: January 7, 2006
- Predecessor: Adolfo Rodríguez Vidal
- Successor: Pedro Felipe Bacarreza Rodríguez
- Previous post: Bishop of Osorno (1982–1994)

Orders
- Ordination: September 18, 1954 by Eduardo Larraín Córdovez
- Consecration: December 19, 1982 by Alejandro Durán Moreira, Orozimbo Fuenzalida and Alberto Jara Franzoy

Personal details
- Born: January 30, 1930 Coltauco, Chile
- Died: December 26, 2025 (aged 95) Rancagua, Chile
- Motto: Ut Mundus Credat

Miguel Blas Caviedes Medina (January 30, 1930 – December 26, 2025) was a Chilean Roman Catholic prelate.

Caviedes was born in Coltauco, Chile, on January 30, 1930. He studied philosophy at the seminary in Santiago, and theology at the faculty of theology of the Catholic University of Chile.

He was ordained a priest in the Cathedral of Rancagua on September 18, 1954, by Msgr. Eduardo Larraín, then Bishop of Rancagua. Pope John Paul II elected him Bishop of Osorno on October 30, 1982. He was consecrated as a bishop at the Cathedral of Rancagua on December 19, 1982, by Alejandro Durán, Bishop of Rancagua. The principal co-consecrators were Orozimbo Fuenzalida, Bishop of Santa Maria de los Los Ángeles, and Alberto Jara, Bishop of Chillán. John Paul II transferred him to the Diocese of Santa Maria de los Los Ángeles on February 1, 1994, due to Msgr. Adolfo Rodríguez's retirement.

Caviedes died in the city of Rancagua, on December 26, 2025 at the age of 95.

Catholic Church titles
Preceded by Adolfo Rodríguez Vidal	Bishop of Santa María de Los Ángeles; 1994–2006	Succeeded by Pedro Felipe Bacarreza Rodríguez
Preceded by Francisco Valdés Subercaseaux	Bishop of Osorno; 1982–1994	Succeeded by Alejandro Goić
