= Alejandro Goic =

Alejandro Goic may refer to:

- Alejandro Goic (actor) (born 1957), Chilean actor
- Alejandro Goić (bishop) (1940–2025), Chilean Roman Catholic bishop
