= Diocese of Osorno =

Catholic ecclesiastical territory

Diocese of Osorno Dioecesis Osornensis Diócesis de Osorno

Catholic
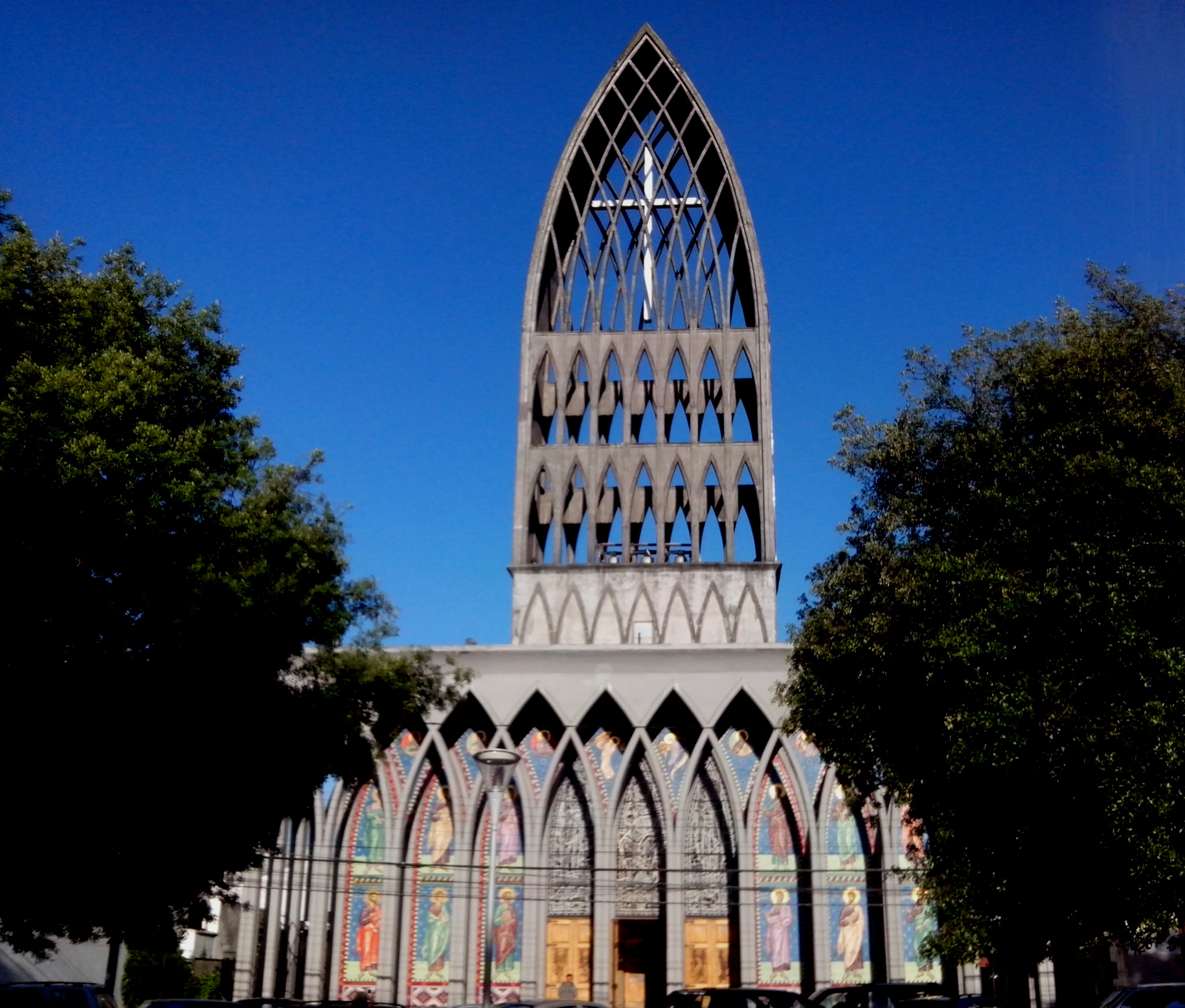
- Cathedral of St. Matthew the Apostle

Location
- Country: Chile
- Ecclesiastical province: Puerto Montt
- Metropolitan: Puerto Montt

Statistics
- Area: 9,236 km^{2} (3,566 sq mi)
- Population: Total; Catholics: (as of 2004); 221,509; 113,159 (51.1%)

Information
- Rite: Latin Rite
- Established: 15 November 1955 (70 years ago)
- Cathedral: Cathedral of St Matthew in Osorno
- Patron saint: St Matthew the Apostle

Current leadership
- Pope: Leo XIV
- Bishop: Carlos Alberto Godoy Labraña
- Metropolitan Archbishop: Luis Fernando Ramos Pérez
- Bishops emeritus: Juan Barros Madrid

Website
- iglesiadeosorno.cl

The Roman Catholic Diocese of Osorno (in Latin: Dioecesis Osornensis ) is a suffragan diocese of the archdiocese of Puerto Montt, in Chile. The diocese was established on 15 November 1955 by Pope Pius XII by means of the papal bull Christianorum qui in Diocesibus.

== Diocesan statistics ==
The diocese, which comprises the entire province of Osorno in the Los Lagos region of Chile, covers a territory of 9,236 km² and has 22 parishes. According to the 2002 census by the Chilean Instituto Nacional de Estadística, 69.3% of the diocesan population of Osorno, ages 15 and over, considered themselves as Catholic. This figure represents about 154,000 Catholics out of a total population of 221,509 (2002).

The mother church of the diocese is the Cathedral of San Mateo in the city of Osorno.

== Bishops of Osorno ==
- Francisco Valdés Subercaseaux, O.F.M. Cap. † (20 June 1956 – 4 January 1982, died)
- Miguel Caviedes Medina (8 November 1982 – 19 February 1994, appointed bishop of Los Angeles)
- Alejandro Goic Karmelic (27 October 1994 – 10 July 2003, appointed coadjutor bishop of Rancagua). Mgr. Goic is the current president of the Chilean Conference of Catholic Bishops.
- René Osvaldo Rebolledo Salinas, former Vicar General of Villarrica (8 May 2004 - 14 December 2013, appointed Archbishop of La Serena)
- Juan Barros Madrid (March 2015 – 11 June 2018, resigned)
- Jorge Enrique Concha Cayuqueo, O.F.M. (6 February 2020 -Marzo 2013)
- Carlos Alberto Godoy Labraña, O.F.M. (11 Nov 2023)

== Parishes ==
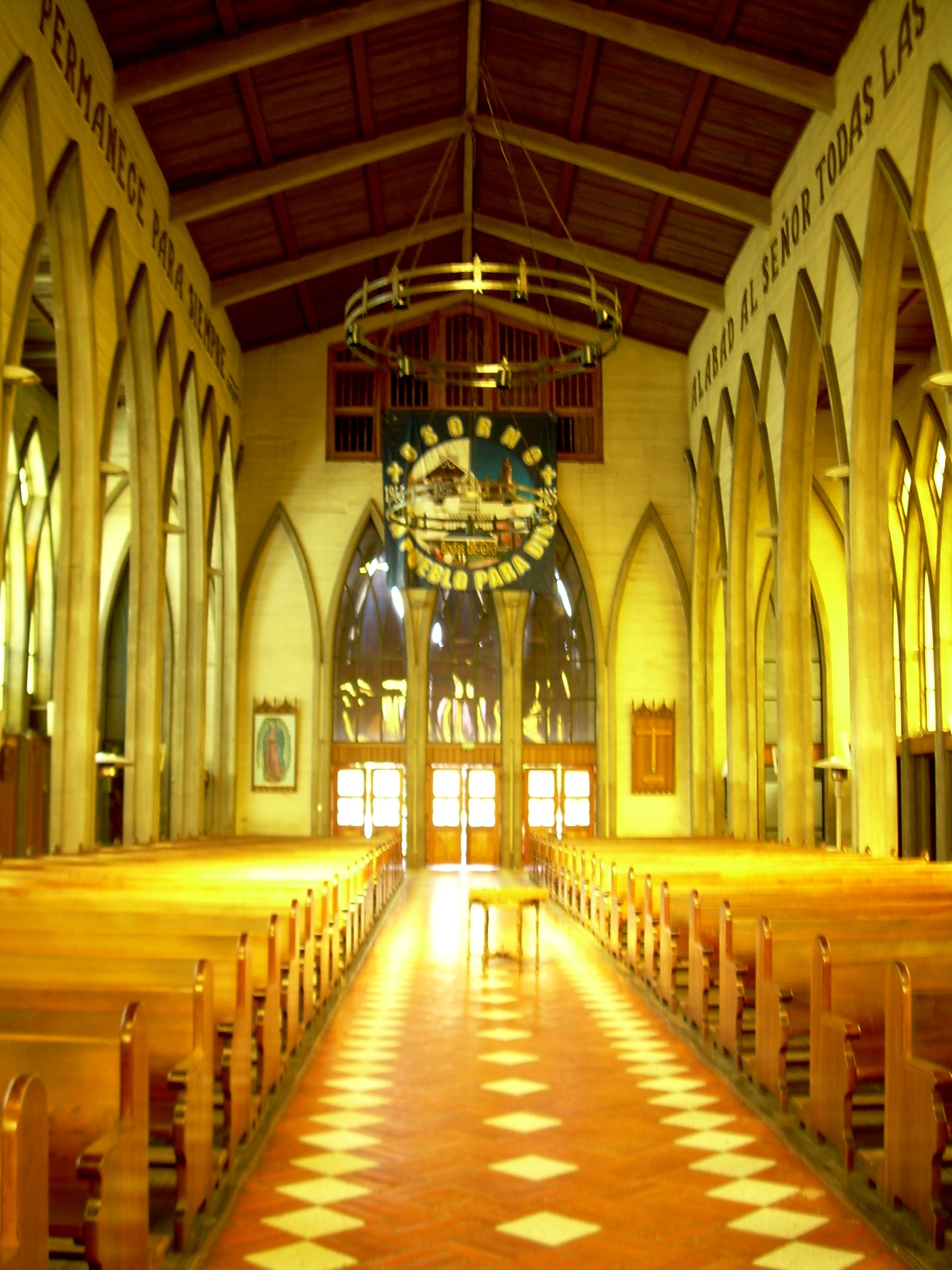
Osorno Cathedral interior

City of Osorno and its surroundings:

- San Mateo Apóstol, Cathedral (1792)
- Nuestra Señora del Carmen (1957)
- Sagrado Corazón (1964)
- San Francisco (1967)
- María Reina de los Mártires (1990)
- Santa Rosa de Lima (2001)
- Nuestra Señora de Lourdes (1930)
- Jesús Obrero (1964)
- El Buen Pastor (1972)
- San José (1980)
- San Leopoldo Mandic (1986)

Other localities:

- Sagrada Familia (1901), Río Negro
- San Joaquín y Santa Ana (1910), Río Negro
- San Juan Bautista (1806), Mission (Misión) of San Juan de la Costa
- Cristo Resucitado (1975), Mission of Cuinco (San Juan de la Costa)
- San Bernardino (1794), Mission of Quilacahuín (San Pablo)
- Nuestra Señora de la Candelaria (1836), San Pablo
- San Agustín (1904), Puerto Octay
- San Juan Nepomuceno (1909), Cancura (Osorno)
- San Sebastián (1944), Purranque
- Nuestra Señora de Fátima (1955), Entre Lagos (Puyehue)
- San Pedro Apóstol (1970), Rupanco (Puyehue)
