= Blanca Subercaseaux de Valdés =

Chilean writer and artist

- Born: Blanca Subercaseaux Errázuriz; c. 1885–c. 1887; Chile
- Died: August 1965 (aged 77–80)
- Occupations: Writer; artist
- Spouse: Horacio Valdés Ortúzar (m. 1906)
- Children: 5 including, Francisco Valdés Subercaseaux; Gabriel Valdés
- Parents: Ramón Subercaseaux Vicuña (father); Amalia Errázuriz de Subercaseaux (mother)
- Relatives: Pedro Subercaseaux (brother); Luis Subercaseaux (brother); Juan Subercaseaux (brother); Juan Gabriel (grandson); José Tomás Errázuriz (uncle); Eugenia Errázuriz (aunt); Maximiano Errázuriz Valdivieso (grandfather); Carmen Quiroga de Urmeneta (great-grandmother); Federico Errázuriz Zañartu (great-grandfather); Eulogia Echaurren (great-grandmother)
- Family: Errázuriz family Subercaseaux family
- Writing career
- Pen name: Carmen Valle
- Language: Spanish; Latin
- Years active: 1929–1965

Blanca Subercaseaux de Valdés (née Subercaseaux Errázuriz; c. 1885–c. 1887 – 1965), known by the pen name Carmen Valle, was a Chilean writer and artist.

== Biography ==
Blanca Subercaseaux Errázuriz was born in either 1885 or 1887 in Chile to Ramón Subercaseaux Vicuña, a painter, politician and diplomat, and Amalia Errázuriz de Subercaseaux (née Errázuriz Urmeneta), a writer and the founder of the Chilean Ladies League. Through her father Subercaseaux was a member of the Subercaseaux family, and was the granddaughter of the politician and businessperson Ramón Subercaseaux Mercado. Through her mother Subercaseaux was a member of the Errázuriz family, and was the granddaughter of Maximiano Errázuriz Valdivieso, and the niece of José Tomás Errázuriz and Eugenia Errázuriz. One of ten siblings, Subercaseaux was the sister of Pedro Subercaseaux, Luis Subercaseaux and Juan Subercaseaux.

In the 1890s the family lived in Paris before returning to Chile. In 1892, Subercaseaux and her sister Rosaria were the subjects of A Portrait of the Daughters of Ramón Subercaseaux by Anders Zorn. From 1898 to 1903 the family lived in Berlin.

== Career ==
Subercaseaux primarily wrote Catholic devotional literature and biographies. In 1929, Subercaseaux wrote the latin libretto for Marta Canales' "Marta y María". The same year Subercaseaux and her family moved to Italy before later returning to Chile.

In 1935, Subercaseaux was the Honorary General President for the Consejo de las Marías de los Sagrarios.

In August 1947, Subercaseaux exhibited a series of watercolours alongside her son Francisco Valdés Subercaseaux.

== Personal life ==
In September 1906, Subercaseaux married Horacio Valdés Ortúzar, an engineer. Valdés and Subercaseaux had 5 children including Francisco Valdés Subercaseaux and Gabriel Valdés.

A friend of Gabriela Mistral, the poems "Message to Blanca" (Spanish: Encargo a Blanca) and "Blessings" (Spanish: Bendiciones; 1924) are dedicated to Subercaseaux.

Subercaseaux died in August 1965.

== Bibliography ==
- Amalia Errázuriz de Subercaseaux (1 ed.). Padre Las Casas, Chile: San Francisco. c. 1934.
- Valle, Carmen (1938). Francisca o la puerta angosta. Padre Las Casas, Chile: San Francisco.
- Valle, Carmen (1939). Nuestro hermano o la belleza de Jesús conocida a través de las Sagradas Escrituras. Padre Las Casas, Chile: San Francisco.
- Valle, Carmen (1940). Hasta que el venga: Cuentos para los Catolicos. Santiago, Chile.
- Valle, Carmen (1941). Cántico nuevo. Temuco, Chile: Padre Las Casas.
- Valle, Carmen (1942). Sabado Santo: Novela. Padre Las Casas, Chile: San Francisco.
- Valle, Carmen (1944). Un alma cumbre: Juana Ross de Edwards (PDF). Padre Las Casas, Chile: San Francisco.
- Subercaseaux de Valdés, Blanca (1946). Amalia Errázuriz de Subercaseaux (2 ed.). Buenos Aires: Emecé.
- Valle, Carmen (1954). Don Maximiano. Santiago, Chile: Editorial Alonso Ovalle.
- Valle, Carmen (1965). Mara. Santiago, Chile: Del Pacífico.
