= Diocese of Rancagua =

Roman Catholic diocese in Chile

Diocese of Rancagua Dioecesis Rancaguensis Diócesis de Rancagua

Catholic
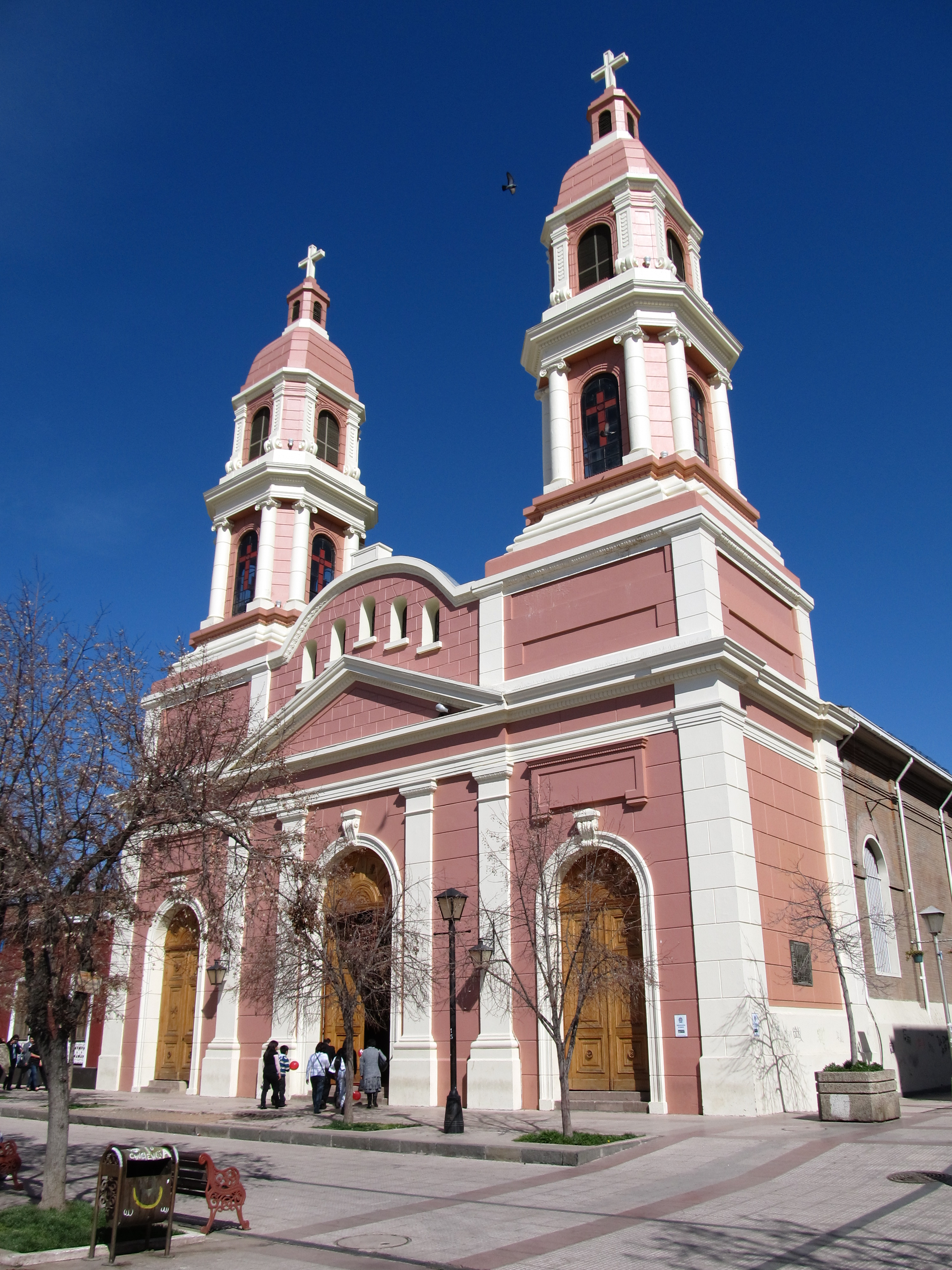
- The Cathedral of Rancagua

Location
- Country: Chile
- Ecclesiastical province: Santiago de Chile
- Metropolitan: Santiago de Chile

Statistics
- Area: 16,042 km^{2} (6,194 sq mi)
- Population: Total; Catholics: (as of 2010); 869,000; 699,000 (80.4%)
- Parishes: 64

Information
- Denomination: Roman Catholic
- Rite: Latin Rite
- Established: 18 October 1925 (101 years ago)
- Cathedral: Cathedral of the Holy Cross in Rancagua
- Patron saint: Holy Cross

Current leadership
- Pope: Leo XIV
- Bishop: Guillermo Patricio Vera Soto
- Metropolitan Archbishop: Fernando Chomalí Garib, OFM Cap

Website
- Website of the Diocese

The Roman Catholic Diocese of Rancagua (in Latin: Dioecesis Rancaguensis) is a suffragan diocese of the Archdiocese of Santiago de Chile. The diocese was established on 18 October 1925 as Diócesis de Santa Cruz de Rancagua, by Pope Pius XII by means of the papal bull Apostolici muneris ratio.

The diocese is headed by Guillermo Patricio Vera Soto, who was named Bishop by Pope Francis on 8 June 2021.

== Diocesan statistics ==
The diocese comprises the three provinces of the O'Higgins Region of Chile: Cachapoal, Colchagua and Cardenal Caro, with the exception of the comuna of Navidad, of the latter province, which belongs to the diocese of Melipilla. It covers a territory of 16,042 km^{2} (6,194 sq mi) and has 63 parishes. It is estimated that 80 percent of the population of the diocese is Catholic. This figure represents about 625,000 Catholics out of a total population of 781,000 persons.

The diocesan cathedral is located in the city of Rancagua.

== Bishops ==
=== Bishops of Rancagua ===
| Name | Reign began | Reign ended | Notes |
|---|---|---|---|
| Rafael Lira Infante † | 14 December 1925 | 18 March 1938 | Appointed bishop of Valparaíso |
| Eduardo Larraín Cordovez † | 9 July 1938 | 2 February 1970 | Retired |
| Alejandro Durán Moreira † | 2 February 1970 | 30 May 1986 | Retired |
| Jorge Medina Estévez | 25 November 1987 | 16 April 1993 | Appointed bishop of Valparaíso; future Cardinal (Protodeacon, 2005-2007) |
| Francisco Javier Prado Aránguiz, SS.CC. † | 16 April 1993 | 23 April 2004 | Retired |
| Alejandro Goić Karmelić | 23 April 2004 | 28 June 2018 | Translated from Osorno |
| Guillermo Patricio Vera Soto | 8 June 2021 | present | Translated from Iquique |

=== Coadjutor bishop ===
- Alejandro Goić Karmelić (2003–2004)

=== Auxiliary bishops ===
- Raul Silva Silva (1963–1994)
- Jorge Arturo Augustin Medina Estévez (1984–1987), appointed Bishop here; future Cardinal
- Luis Gleisner Wobbe (1991–2001), appointed Auxiliary Bishop of La Serena

=== Other priests of this diocese who became bishops ===
- Francisco de Borja Valenzuela Ríos, appointed Apostolic Administrator of Copiapó in 1955; appointed Prelate of Copiapó in 1956
- Orozimbo Fuenzalida y Fuenzalida, appointed Prelate of Calama in 1968
- Miguel Caviedes Medina, appointed Bishop of Osorno in 1982
