= St. Mary of the Angels Cathedral (Los Ángeles, Chile) =

Coordinates: 37.4703°S 72.3526°W

- Catedral de Santa María de los Ángeles
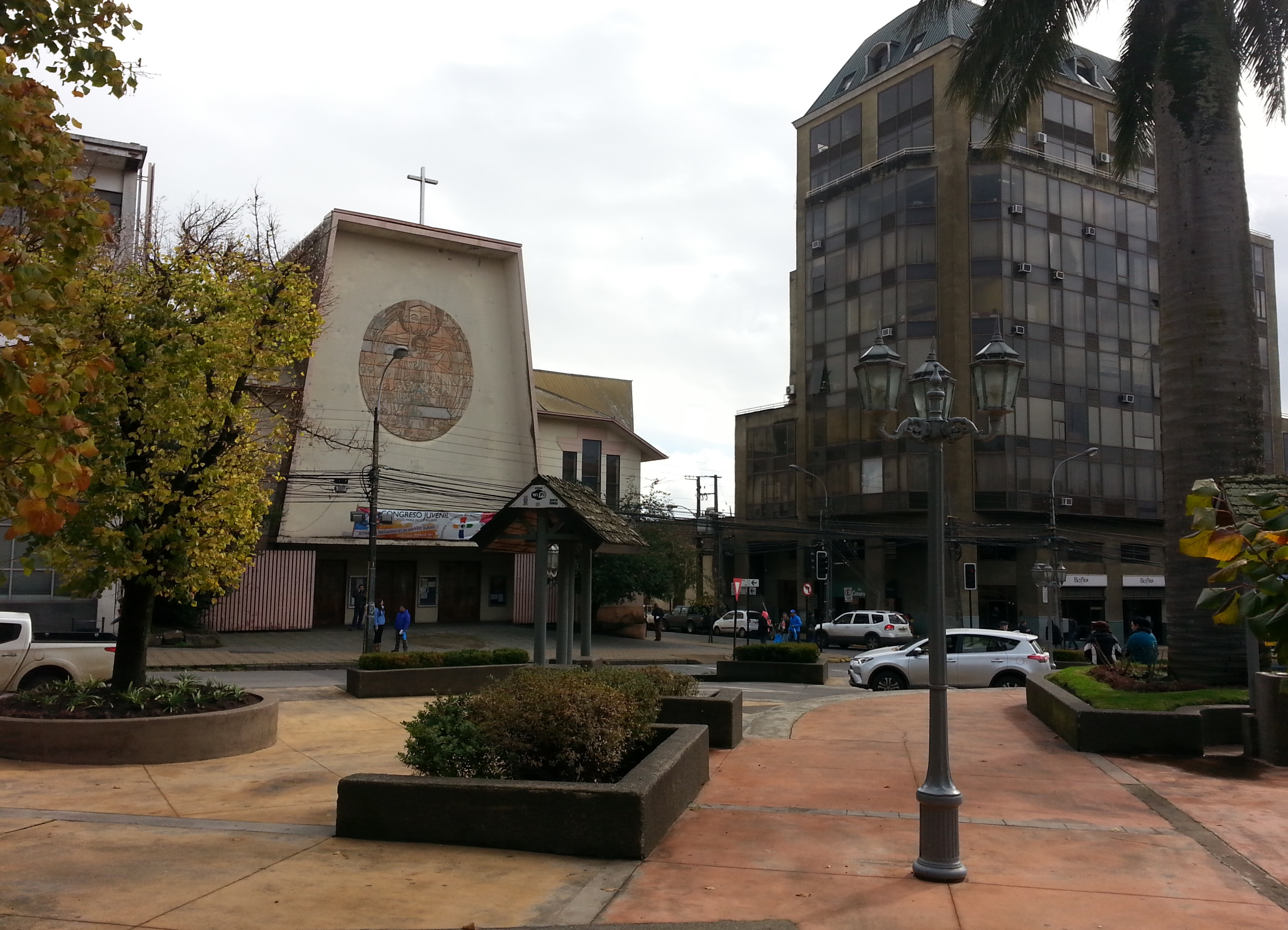
- St. Mary of the Angels Cathedral
- Location: Los Ángeles
- Country: Chile
- Denomination: Roman Catholic Church

The Cathedral of St. Mary of the Angels (Spanish: Catedral de Santa María de los Ángeles), also Los Ángeles Cathedral, is the Catholic cathedral of the Diocese of Santa María de Los Ángeles in Chile. It is located in the center of the city, opposite the Plaza de Armas.

It was built between the years 1970 and 1972. On the frontis are shown different scenes of the Holy Trinity. The interior of the temple has no columns, so you can see a complete panoramic view. On the altar is the image of Jesus Christ painted in large, work by Pedro Subercaseaux. The interior walls are ornamented with fragments of the Bible and on one side is placed the image of the Virgin of Carmen carved in native wood.

== See also ==
- Catholic Church in Chile
