= Francisco Valdés Subercaseaux =

Chilean Roman Catholic prelate

Venerable Maximiano Valdés Subercaseaux OFMCap
- Bishop of Osorno
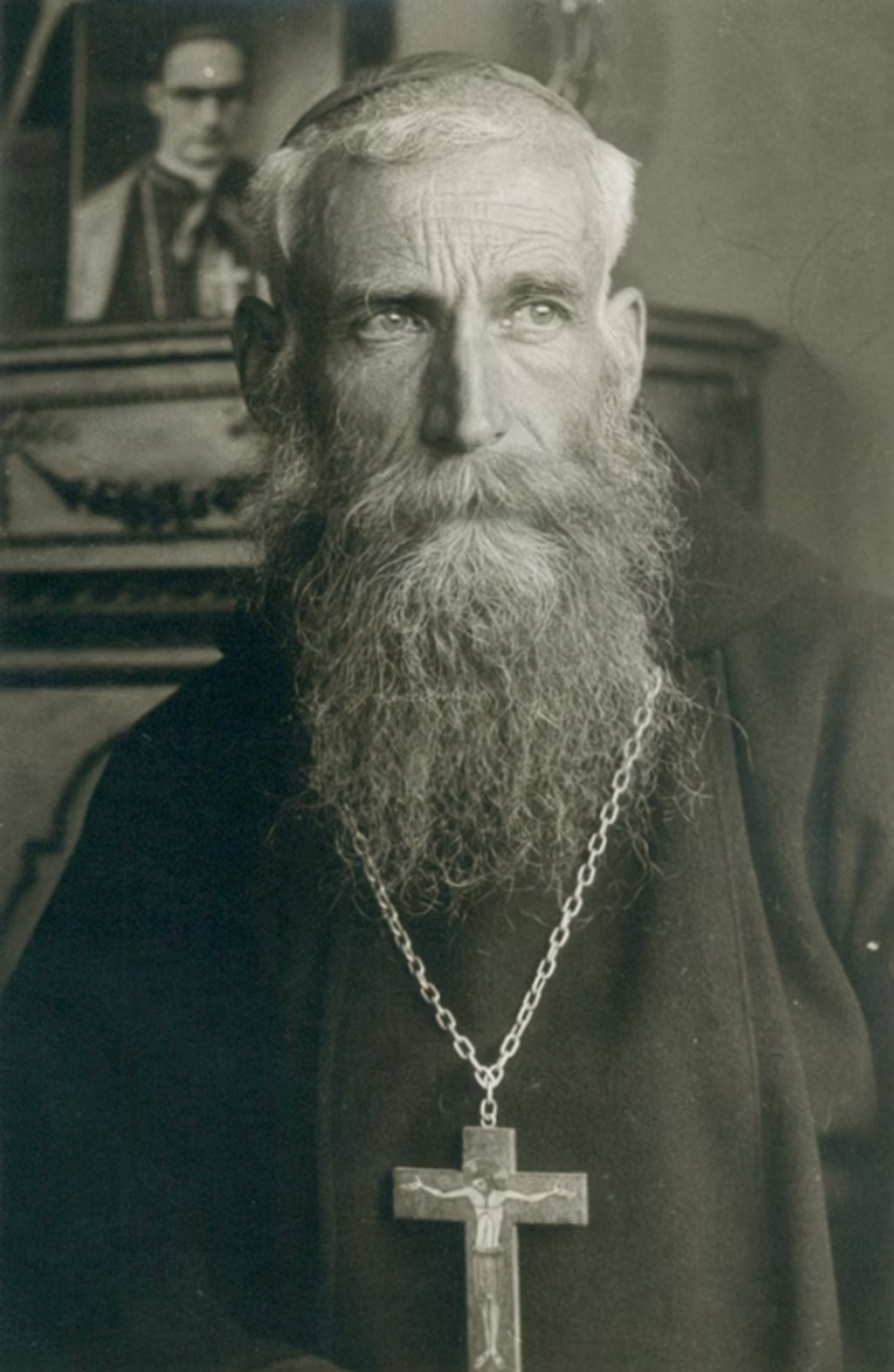
- Church: Roman Catholic Church
- Diocese: Osorno
- See: Osorno
- Appointed: 20 June 1956
- Installed: 18 October 1956
- Term ended: 4 January 1982
- Predecessor: None - diocese established
- Successor: Miguel Caviedes Medina

Orders
- Ordination: 17 March 1934 by Giovanni Jeremich
- Consecration: 16 September 1956 by Sebastiano Baggio
- Rank: Bishop

Personal details
- Born: Maximiano María Antonio Miguel Valdés Subercaseaux; 23 September 1908 San Miguel, Santiago, Chile
- Died: 4 January 1982 (aged 73) San Francisco Hospital, Pucón, Cautín, Chile
- Buried: St. Matthew's Cathedral, Osorno, Chile
- Motto: Quia amo Te ("Lord, You know that I love You")

Sainthood
- Venerated in: Roman Catholic Church
- Attributes: Capuchin habit; Episcopal attire

Styles of Francisco Valdés Subercaseaux O.F.M. Cap.
- Reference style: His Excellency; The Most Reverend
- Spoken style: Your Excellency
- Religious style: Bishop
- Posthumous style: Venerable

Maximiano Valdés Subercaseaux (23 September 1908 – 4 January 1982) - in religious Francisco - was a Chilean Roman Catholic prelate who was a professed member from the Order of Friars Minor Capuchin and served as the first Bishop of Osorno from 1956 until his death. Valdés discerned his call to the priesthood while with his parents in Europe and was ordained as a priest in Venice after completing his studies in Rome but continued further formation amongst the Franciscans in Europe before making his return to Chile. He was the first Chilean to have become a Capuchin friar. Valdés dedicated his episcopal career to the poor and he often visited the poor regions around his diocese while remaining a staunch advocate for a peaceful resolution to the Chile-Argentina border disputes; his last words also contained a desire for there to be peace between the two feuding nations.

The cause for his beatification was launched in 1998 and titled him as a Servant of God while Pope Francis declared Valdés to be Venerable on 7 November 2014 after recognizing his life of heroic virtue.

== Life ==
=== Education and priesthood ===
Maximiano María Antonio Miguel Valdés Subercaseaux was born on 23 September 1908 in San Miguel in the Santiago Province as the second of five children to Horacio Valdés Ortúzar, an engineer, and Blanca Subercaseaux de Valdés (née Subercaseaux Errázuriz), a writer and artist. His parents were married on 12 September 1906 and were devout Christians. His brother Gabriel served as the Foreign Minister and later the Senate President while his son (Valdés' nephew) Juan Gabriel serves as the current Chilean ambassador to the United States of America since 2014. His baptism was celebrated on 24 September.

He received a special dispensation from Pope Pius X to have his First Communion before the required age and the celebration was held on 30 March 1913 while he received his Confirmation on 11 April 1914 from Archbishop Juan Ignacio González Eyzaguirre. Valdés began his schooling at the San Ignacio school.

In 1925 he travelled to Europe with his parents where he first felt called to the priesthood and to the religious life. On 26 January 1930 he became the first native from his nation to join the Order of Friars Minor Capuchin when he was received into their novitiate and he was given the religious name of "Francisco of San Miguel de Santiago". He began his ecclesial studies in Rome in 1927 at the Pontifical Latin American college and the Pontifical Gregorian in Rome before he received his ordination to the priesthood on 17 March 1934 in Venice from Bishop Giovanni Jeremich. He had received a philosophical doctorate from the Gregorian in 1929 and later earned one for theological studies during the 1930s. Valdés made his first vows into the order on 27 January 1931 and continued his formation across both Germany and Italy before he made his perpetual and solemn profession on 2 February 1934.

In 1935 - now back in Chile - he was assigned to the Apostolic Vicariate of Araucanía - a remote region - and served as a professor of philosophical studies at San Fidel in San José de la Mariquina. He served as the parish priest for Pucón between 1943 and 1956. During that period he helped to establish a convent for the Capuchin Poor Clares in his parish while also working and maintaining close ties with the Mapuche people.

=== Episcopate ===
Pope Pius XII appointed Valdés as the first Bishop of Osorno on 20 June 1956 with Sebastiano Baggio conferring upon him episcopal consecration on 16 September. Valdés attended all sessions of the Second Vatican Council from 11 October 1962 to 8 December 1965 as a Council Father. He was an ardent supporter and staunch advocate for dialogue and peace between Chile and Argentina in their border dispute and made repeated calls for fraternal negotiations aimed at ensuring better cooperation and coexistence between the two nations. Valdés loved sacred music and liturgical celebrations and in 1966 presided over an Episcopal Commission on liturgical celebration to better enhance such celebrations as an expression of faith. He inaugurated the new diocesan cathedral in 1977 after the previous one had fallen during the Valdivia earthquake in 1960.

=== Death ===
Valdés was diagnosed in 1981 with gastric cancer. He spent his last months with the Capuchin friars of Araucanía. He died in 1982 at the San Francisco Hospital in Pucón; his last words were: "I offer my life to the pope, to the Church, to the Diocese of Osorno, to the poor, to the peace between Chile and Argentina, and to the triumph of love". He was buried in the diocesan cathedral.

== Beatification process ==
The beatification process for the late friar commenced under Pope John Paul II on 25 September 1998 after the Congregation for the Causes of Saints issued the official edict of "nihil obstat" (nothing against the cause) and titled him as a Servant of God. The investigation commenced in Osorno in a diocesan process that collected testimonies and documents and the C.C.S. later validated this process in Rome on 7 June 2002 after determining the process did all that was required of it. The postulation appointed a relator who would assist in preparing the Positio dossier in an effort to collate all available evidence to attest to the friar's saintliness and this was submitted to the C.C.S. on 29 November 2012.

Theologians evaluated the contents of the dossier and issued their approval for the cause on 18 March 2014 while the cardinal and bishop members of the C.C.S. likewise assented to the cause's continuation in their meeting on 4 November 2014. The cause culminated on 7 November 2014 after Pope Francis confirmed that Valdés lived a model life of heroic virtue and named him as Venerable.

The current postulator for this cause is the Franciscan priest Carlo Calloni.

=== Failed miracle ===
His beatification depended on a miracle being approved and one such case had been investigated in the diocese of its origin; the C.C.S. later validated this in Rome on 16 November 2007 but could not investigate it further until Valdés had been proclaimed Venerable as was the requirement. The medical experts advising the C.C.S. met on 21 May 2015 to determine if the healing was a miracle but found it was not a miracle due to a scientific explanation being evident for such a healing.
