= Alejandro Goić (bishop) =

Chilean bishop of the Catholic Church (1940–2025)

His Excellency Alejandro Goić
- Bishop Emeritus of Rancagua
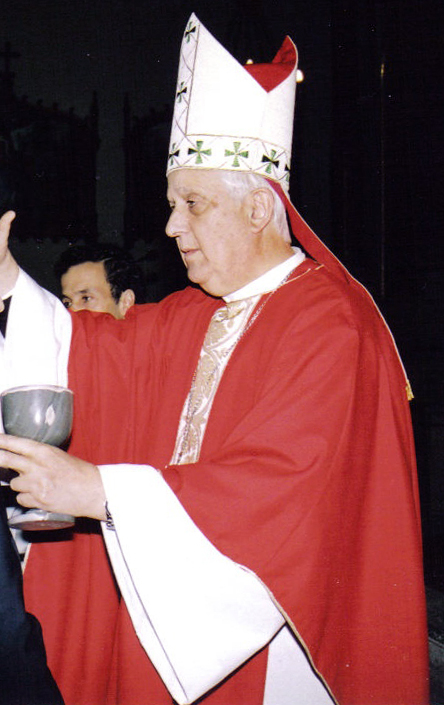
- Archdiocese: Santiago de Chile
- Diocese: Rancagua
- Installed: 23 April 2004
- Term ended: 28 June 2018
- Predecessor: Francisco Javier Prado Aránguiz
- Successor: Guillermo Patricio Vera Soto
- Previous posts: Auxiliary Bishop of Concepción and Titular Bishop of Africa (1979–1988); Apostolic Administrator of Concepción (1988–1989); Auxiliary Bishop of Talca (1991–1994); Bishop of Osorno (1994–2003); Coadjutor Bishop of Rancagua (2003–2004)

Orders
- Ordination: 12 March 1966 by Vladimiro Boric Crnosija
- Consecration: 27 May 1979 by Pope John Paul II, Duraisamy Simon Lourdusamy, Eduardo Martínez Somalo

Personal details
- Born: 7 March 1940 Punta Arenas, Chile
- Died: 1 September 2025 (aged 85) Rancagua, Chile

Alejandro Goić Karmelić (7 March 1940 – 1 September 2025) was a Chilean bishop of the Catholic Church. He was the bishop of the Diocese of Rancagua from 2004 to 2018. He was President of the Chilean Conference of Bishops from 2004 to 2010. He was formerly an auxiliary bishop of the Archdiocese of Concepción and the Bishop of the Diocese of Osorno.

== Biography ==
=== Early life and studies ===
Alejandro Goić Karmelić born in the city of Punta Arenas on 7 March 1940, the son of a family of Croatian immigrants, from the island of Brač, Dalmatia. His father was Pedro Goić and his mother Margarita Karmelić; Alejandro was the youngest of four children.

Goic learned to read at a rural school, and continued his studies at the Instituto Don Bosco and the Liceo Salesiano in Punta Arenas. Later, he joined the Metropolitan Seminary of Concepción, where he studied philosophy, and the Pontifical Catholic University of Chile, where he studied theology.

=== Priest ===
Goic was ordained to the priesthood on 12 March 1966 in Punta Arenas, by the man who motivated him to explore his priestly vocation, the bishop of the diocese, Vladimiro Boric. While in the Diocese of Punta Arenas, Goic served as the priest of Our Lady of Fatima parish and the chaplain of the penitentiary in Punta Arenas, until 1973.

In March 1973, he was appointed Vicar-General of Punta Arenas by Bishop Boric. Upon Boric's death, Goic went on to serve in the post of vicar capitular until the Holy See appointed a bishop for the diocese. The appointment went to Msgr. Tomas Gonzalez, and Goic continued on as vicar general until May 1979. During those years, Father Goic participated in the negotiations that the Catholic Church in Chile made with their counterparts in Argentina, in order to avoid a military conflict in the year 1978 (which would eventually be resolved by the arbitration of Pope John Paul II). Between 1975 and 1976, he continued courses in theology at the Abbey of Saint Andrew in Bruges, Belgium.

=== Bishop ===
Pope John Paul II appointed Goic the titular Bishop of Africa, and auxiliary bishop for the Archdiocese of Concepción. He received episcopal consecration at Rome, on 27 May 1979.

On 30 June 1991, Goic was transferred from his ecclesiastical jurisdiction, this time as auxiliary bishop for the Diocese of Talca. This appointment lasted until 1994, when he was appointed Bishop of Diocese of Osorno.

On 10 July 2003, Pope John Paul II appointed him a coadjutor bishop for the Diocese of Rancagua—a coadjutor bishop performs the same functions as an auxiliary bishop, but is entitled to succession when the office becomes vacant. Thus, with the resignation of Bishop Javier Prado Aránguiz (for reasons of age), Goic took over as the ordinary bishop of the Diocese of Rancagua. He held that post starting in 2004, and was also the President of the Chilean Conference of Bishops. In 2007, Goic was approved for three years in that office.

Pope Francis accepted his resignation on 28 June 2018.

== Social role ==
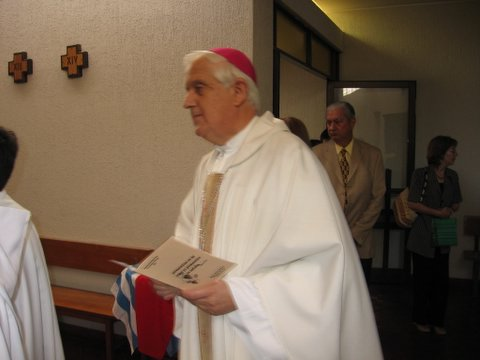
Bishop Goic celebrating Mass

One of the main concerns of Goic's years as a priest were social issues. His special sensitivity to the issues of poverty and social justice originate with a deep identification with the sufferings of Jesus Christ and the principles of the Gospel.

=== Workers' rights ===
During the 1980s, when Goic was auxiliary bishop of the Archdiocese of Concepción, he decided to visit Father Enrique Moreno Laval, a vicar in the Lota coal mining area, in order to familiarize himself with the situation of native workers demanding labor improvements. In turn, he received complaints from unionists in the military regime, who gave him the epithet "Bishop Red". Goic, however, was never afraid of reprisals, although on one occasion recordings of the radio program Testimonio—which documents human rights and labor abuses—were seized by the military.

=== 2006 student protests ===
Although not a formal mediator between the warring parties of the 2006 student demonstrations, Goic repeatedly expressed his desire that the demonstrations reach a successful conclusion. Goic issued a statement expressing his opinion:

There isn't anyone in Chile that doesn't want to improve the quality and equity of education here. One would like to ask the student leaders, who have proven very competent, that they have a little patience, so that [this issue] may be worked through in the parliament.

On 25 May 2006, a group of students threw stones at Goic's residence in the city of Rancagua, having done the same to the city's Liceo Oscar Castro. The bishop had expressed his intention to mediate only hours before.

=== Labor outsourcing ===
In his capacity as Bishop of Rancagua, Goic was a key factor in the 2007 negotiations between conflicting parties in a fight over Codelco's outsourcing of workers. In a letter signed by him as President of the Chilean Conference of Bishops, dated to 18 July 2007, he stated:

Progress is needed on the subject of collective bargaining on the issue of the company's outsourcing. Recent events are a sign of insufficient legislation in this area. The right to collective bargaining in effective terms is a basic right that the international community and the Church itself recognizes as belonging to workers. This recognition is not complete without avenues to prevent the worker from collaborating with those who most directly benefit from the fruits of his labor.

=== Other issues ===
During the first months of 2008, he served as a mediator between the government and Patricia Troncoso, a pro-Mapuche political prisoner who held a hunger strike for 112 days.

In 2009, the Chilean Conference of Bishops, through the Goic's influence, posed the creation of a general presidential pardon for the year 2010, (Note: Unlike particular pardons, general pardons are not an absolute power of the President of the Republic, because they are a matter of law, under Article 60, no. 16 of Chile's constitution.) called the "Bicentennial Pardon". This appeal was subsequently recognized by the government. However, the possibility that military personnel convicted of violations of human rights would benefit from the pardon was ruled out by government spokesperson Carolina Tohá. The pardon was slated to take place after the 2009–2010 presidential election (that is, between mid-January and early March 2010).

=== Death ===
Goić died in Rancagua on 1 September 2025, at the age of 85.

== Controversies ==
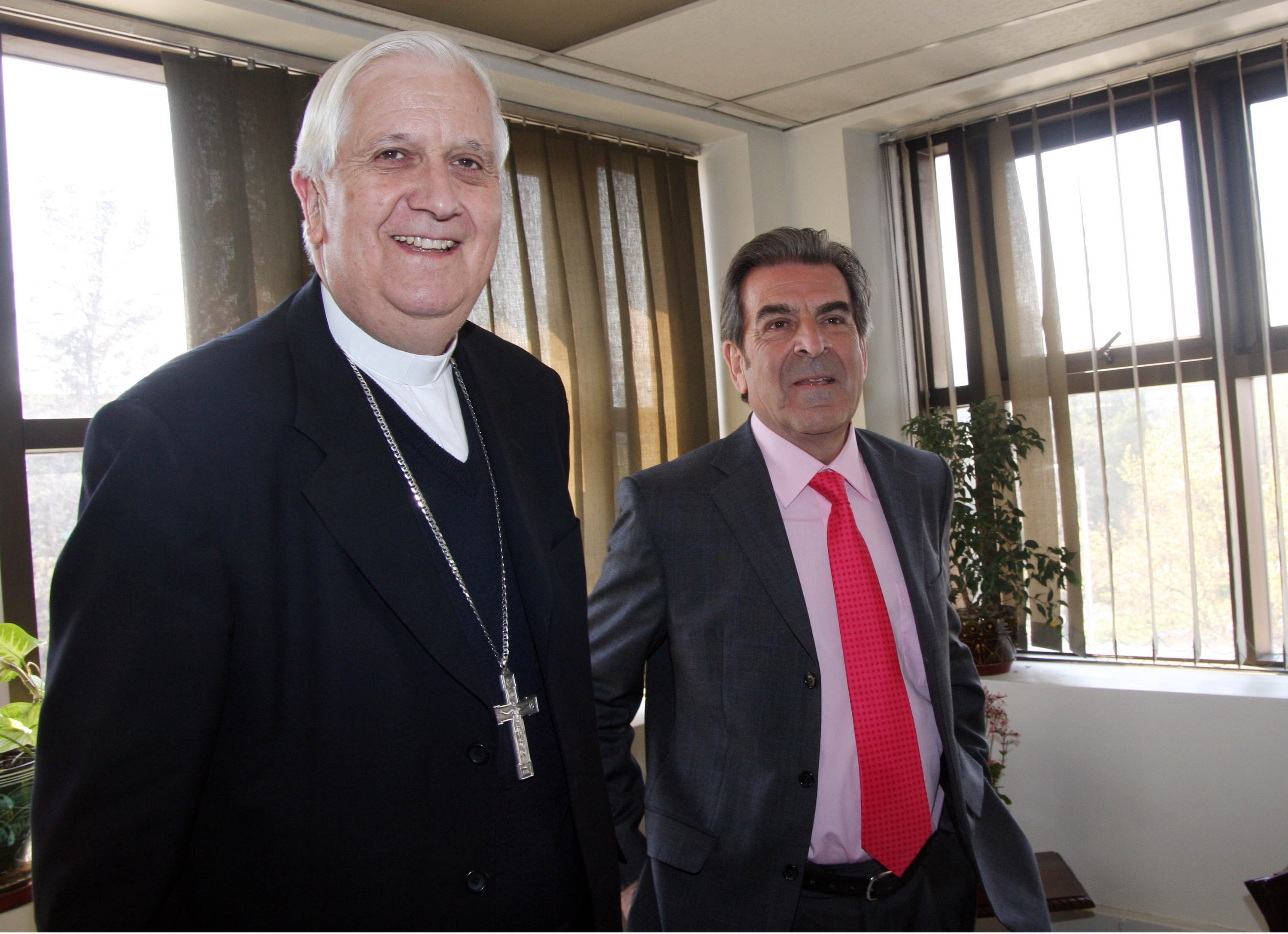
Bishop Goic pictured with 2009 presidential candidate Eduardo Frei

=== Ethical salaries ===
In 2007, just weeks after the state mining company Codelco reached an agreement with the outsourced employees, the prelate said in an interview that the minimum salary of $144,000 CLP (ca. $270 USD) should be replaced by an "ethical wage", which, in his opinion, would be not less than $250,000 CLP (ca. $470 USD). His remarks caused mixed reactions in the country's political, social, and business spheres.

Some characters in the political and business landscape, such as Senator Evelyn Matthei, were skeptical of Bishop Goic's suggestion due to the potential negative effects it could have on small- and medium-sized enterprises; some considered the measure "manipulative". Nevertheless, many political parties and the Government itself were in favor of the proposal.

On 23 August, following a debate launched by Goic, President Michelle Bachelet announced the formation of the Social Equity Advisory Council "Towards a Fairer Chile" (Hacia un Chile más Justo), which aims to propose reforms to Chilean labor.

=== Homosexual unions ===
In November 2009, Goic expressed concern at the emergence of same-sex couples in party political broadcasts for the presidential election of that year, particularly in advertisements for the candidates Eduardo Frei and Sebastián Piñera; the latter was criticized for this issue even within his own coalition, the conservative Independent Democrat Union.

Piñera said he was in "total and absolute agreement" with Bishop Goic, but defended the use of homosexual issues in political campaigns because "a good president has to worry about all Chileans". Jorge Pizarro, the chief of Eduardo Frei's campaign, said in the strongest terms that, "even in the Church there are many homosexuals, people who commit crimes as sensitive as pedophilia, and they exist everywhere: and that's not going to silence the issue". Eduardo Frei was more conciliatory, saying that he could not exclude gay Chileans, because "we are all children of God and, therefore, we should all be welcome in our country".

== Notes and references ==
Notes

References

- Note: All sources are in Spanish.

Catholic Church titles
Preceded by Javier Prado Aránguiz	Bishop of Rancagua; 2004–2018	Succeeded by Guillermo Patricio Vera Soto
Preceded by Francisco Javier Errázuriz Ossa	President of the Chilean Conference of Bishops; 2004–2010	Succeeded by Ricardo Ezzati Andrello
Preceded by Miguel Caviedes	Bishop of Osorno; 1994–2003	Succeeded by René Osvaldo Rebolledo Salinas
Preceded by —	Auxiliary Bishop of Talca; 1991–1994	Succeeded by —
Preceded by Rino Carlesi	Titular Bishop of Africa; 1979–1988	Succeeded by Charles Asa Schleck
Preceded by —	Auxiliary Bishop of Concepción; 1979–1988	Succeeded by —
