= Thibilis =

Byzantine town in modern-day Algeria

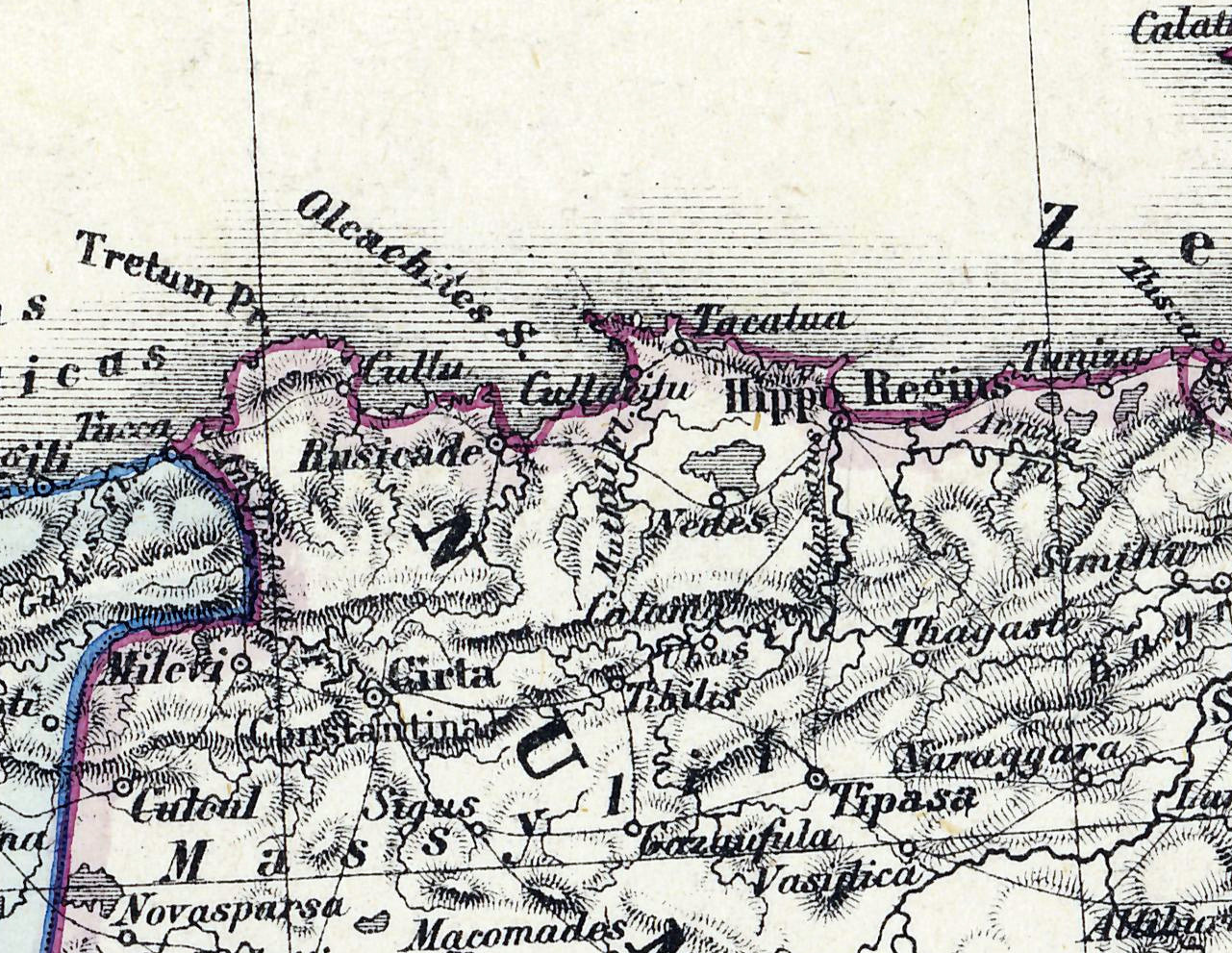
Cirta on the map of Roman Numidia, Atlas Antiquus, H. Kiepert, 1869

Thibilis (a.k.a. Tibilis) was a Roman and Byzantine era town in what was Numidia but is today northeast Algeria. The site has extensive Roman and Byzantine ruins.

== History ==
The numerous Latin inscriptions discovered on the site of Thibilis provided indications on the status and magistrates of this city: during the Early Empire, Thibilis was first a pagus dependent on the Cirtaian confederacy which united Cirta, Rusicade, Chullu and Milève. Enjoying a certain autonomy, the city was administered by two magistri of annual mandate, assisted by one or two aediles.

During the reigns of Antoninus Pius and Marcus Aurelius, notables of Thibilis gained the highest office of the Imperial administration, Quintus Antistius Adventus Aquilinus Postumus, consul suffect about 167, and his son Lucius Antistius Burrus, son-in-law of Marcus Aurelius And consul in 181.

Thibilis gained the rank of municipality headed by two duumviri between 260 and 268 which corresponds to the period estimated for the dissolution of the confederacy. Local cults included flamen Augusti for imperial worship and Saturni (priest of Saturn) and a local deity, Bacax and Magna Mater deorum Idaea, the Great Mother of the Gods.

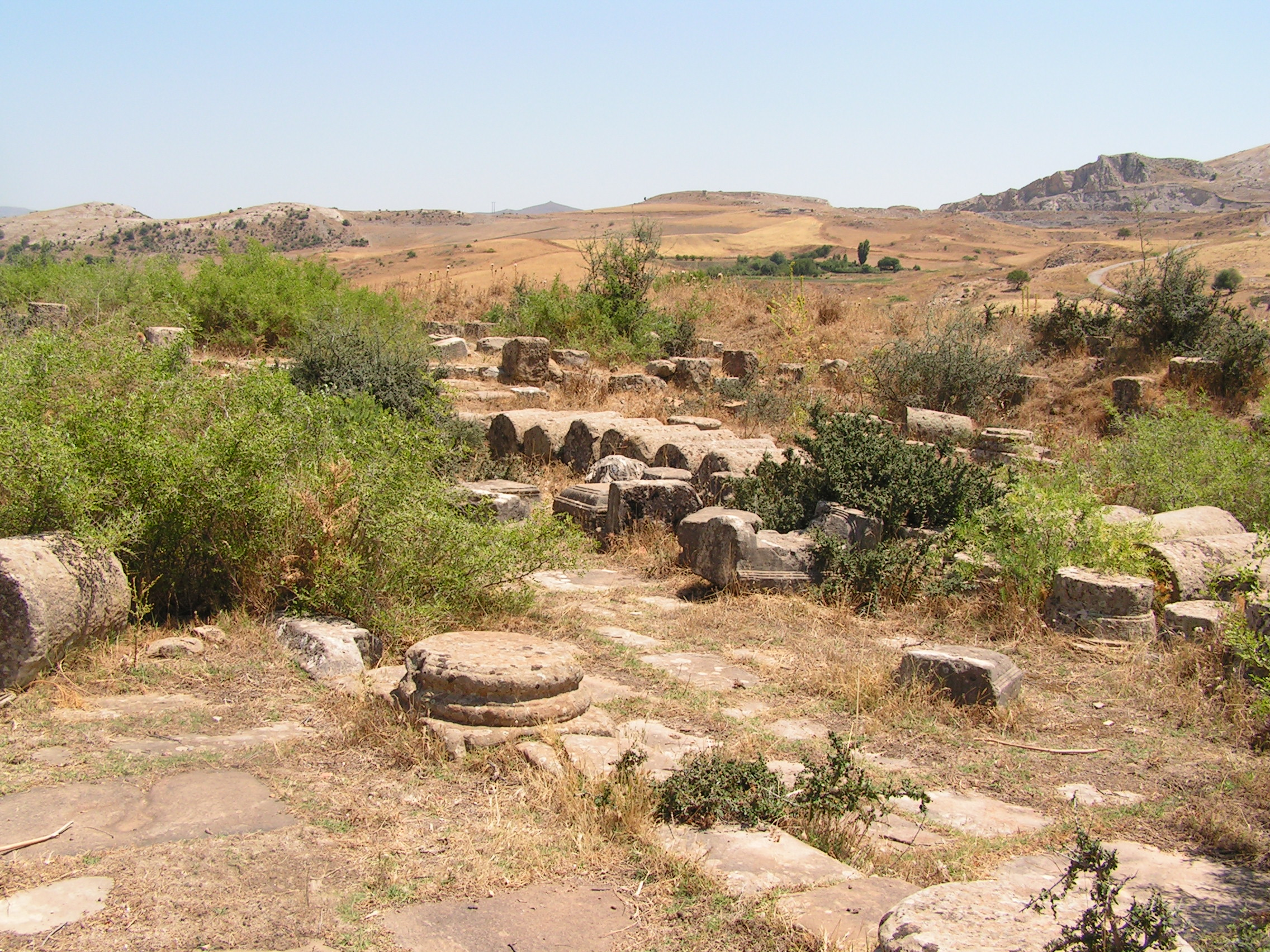
Thibilis

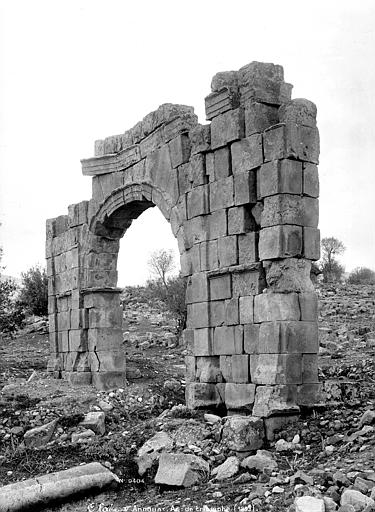
Arc de triumph Thibilis

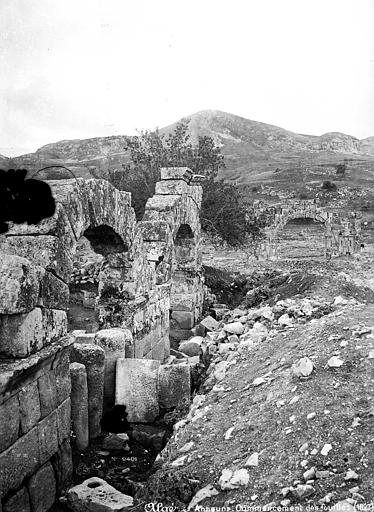
Ruins at Thibilis

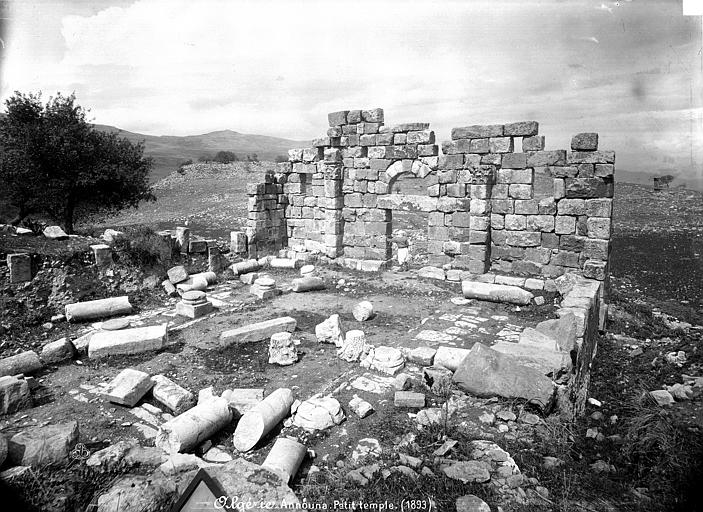
small temple

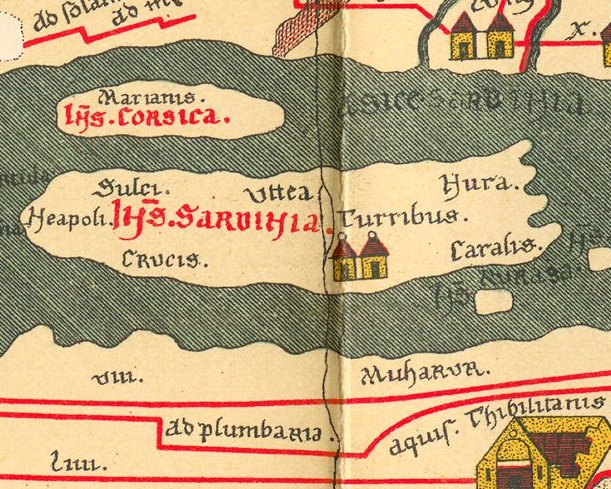
Thblis on Tabula Peutingeriana.

== See also ==
- List of cultural assets of Algeria
