= A Portrait of the Daughters of Ramón Subercaseaux =

Painting by Anders Zorn

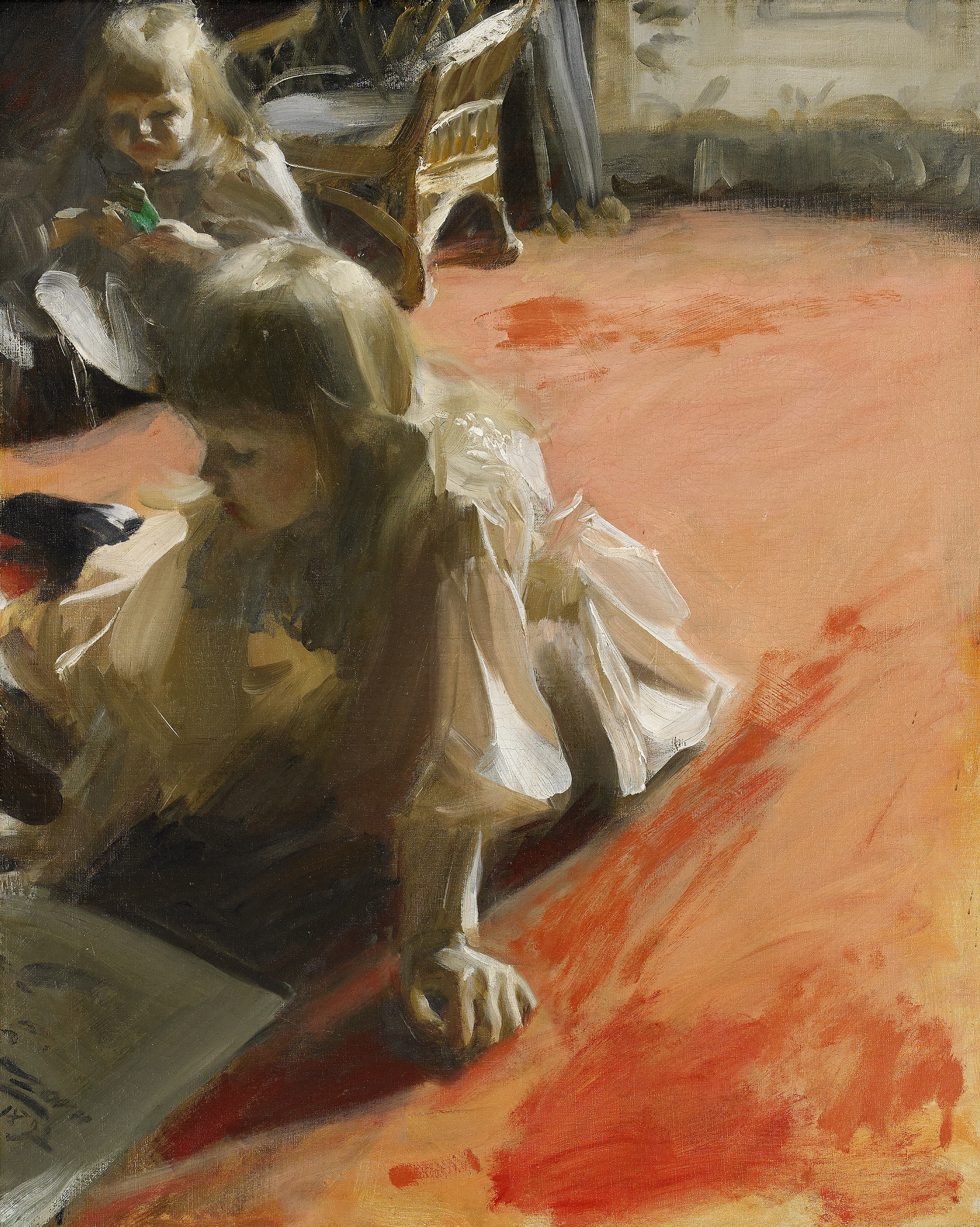
Anders Zorn, A Portrait of the Daughters of Ramón Subercasseaux, 32 by 25 1/2 in (81.3 by 65 cm). 1892. Oil on canvas. Private collection.

A Portrait of the Daughters of Ramón Subercaseaux is an 1892 oil painting by Swedish artist Anders Zorn.

== Background ==
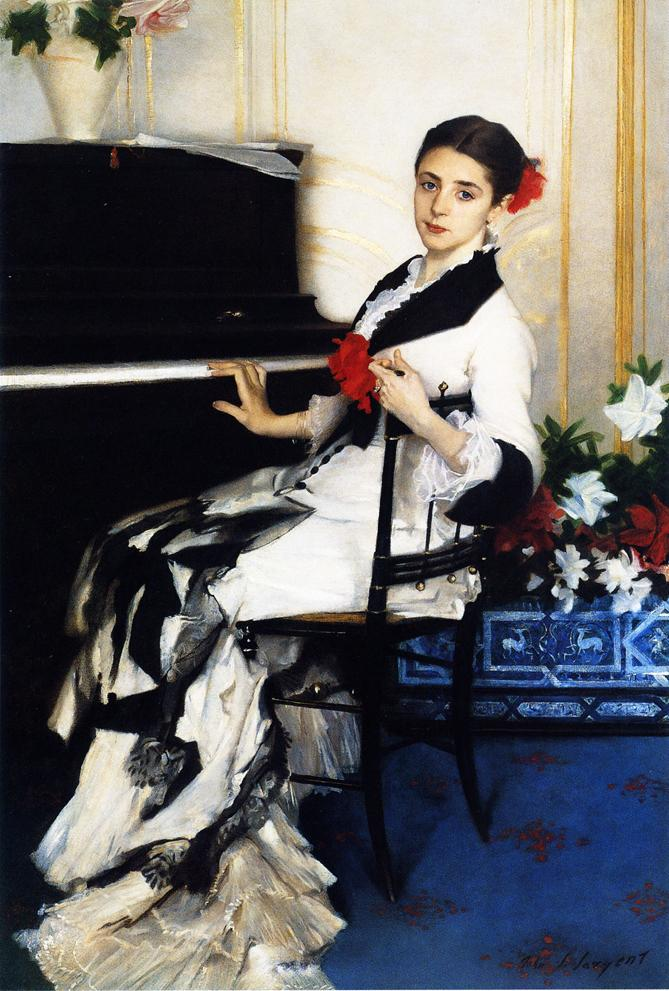
John Singer Sargent, Madame Ramon Subercaseaux

Anders Zorn moved to Paris with his wife Emma in the spring of 1888 where he came into contact with fellow artists such as John Singer Sargent, Giovanni Boldini and James McNeill Whistler, establishing himself as a successful society portraitist.

Zorn was commissioned by the Chilean painter, politician and diplomat Ramón Subercaseaux to paint this portrait of Subercaseaux' daughters Blanca and Rosaria. Zorn was probably introduced to Subercaseaux by Sargent, who painted a notable portrait of Subercaseaux' wife Madame Ramon Subercaseaux. Boldini also painted portraits of the Subercaseaux family.

== Painting ==
While Boldini's portraits of the Subercaseaux boys portray them conventionally as aware of the viewer, Zorn's portrait of the girls captures their private world, unaware of the viewer's gaze. To this end, Zorn adopts an unusual perspective, tilting the plane of the floor upwards and assuming the position of the girls himself. In all this he was foreshadowed by his Paris-based contemporary Mary Cassatt, whose 1878 Little Girl in a Blue Armchair also sought to observe the private world of her subject.

== Provenance ==
- Commissioned by Ramón Subercaseaux, Paris (1892)
- Matias Errazuriz, Buenos Aires (by descent from the above, his cousin, 1937)
- Josefina Errazuriz Alvear, Buenos Aires (by descent from the above, her father)
- Sale: Sotheby's, New York, October 27, 1988, lot 141, illustrated
- Verner Amell, Stockholm
- Private Collection, Stockholm
- Sale: Sotheby's, New York, May 28, 1992, lot 117, illustrated

It was offered for sale at a Sotheby's (New York) 19th Century European Art auction held 3 November 2015, but was bought in.
