= Diocese of San Bernardo =

Diocese of the Catholic Church in Chile

Coordinates: 33.5932°S 70.7047°W

Diocese of San Bernardo Dioecesis Sancti Bernardi Diócesis de San Bernardo

Catholic
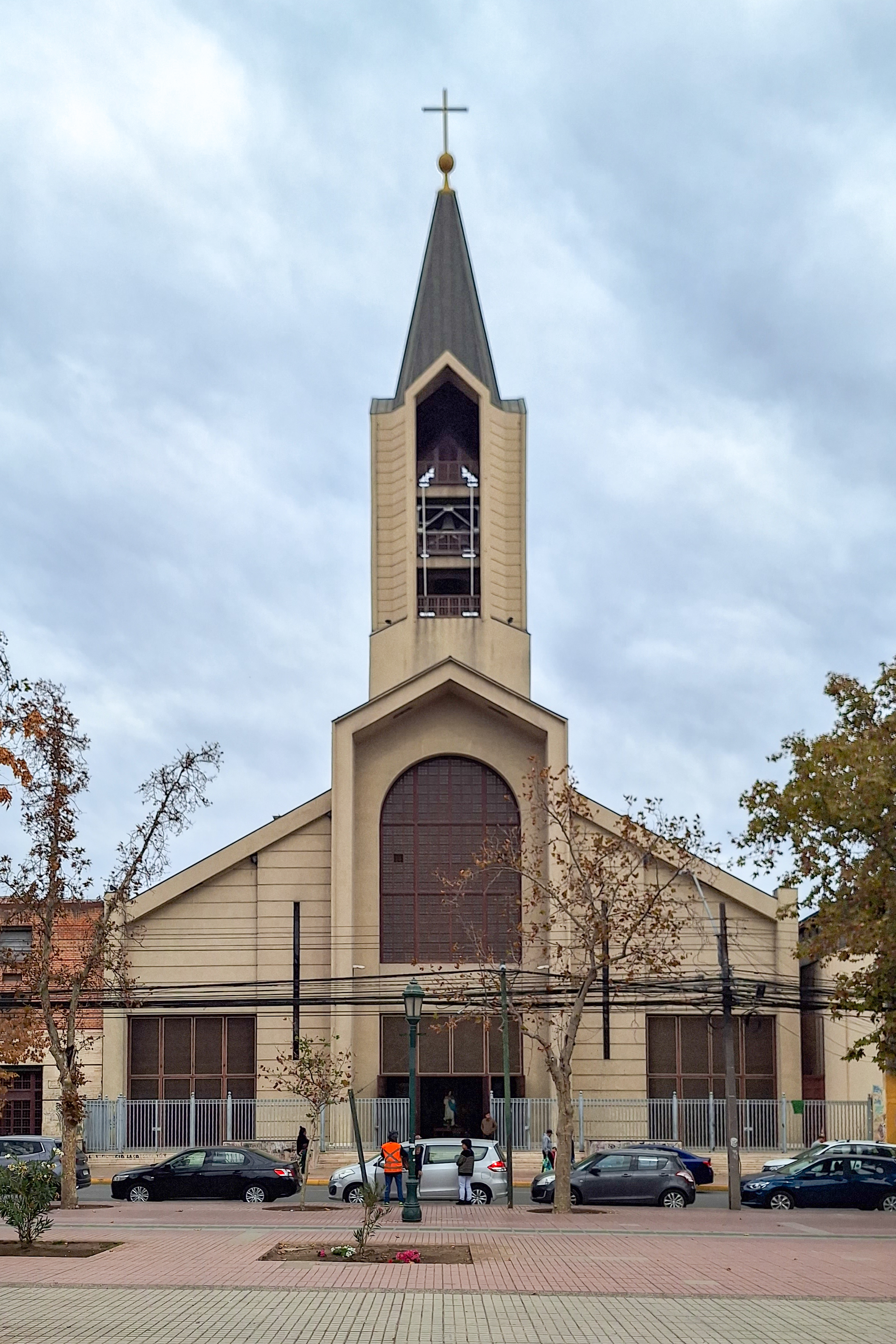

Location
- Country: Chile
- Ecclesiastical province: Santiago de Chile
- Metropolitan: Santiago de Chile

Statistics
- Area: 1,145 km^{2} (442 sq mi)
- Population: Total; Catholics: (as of 2010); 842,000; 613,000 (72.8%)

Information
- Rite: Latin Rite
- Established: 13 July 1987 (39 years ago)
- Cathedral: Cathedral of St Bernard in Santiago
- Patron saint: St Bernard of Clairvaux

Current leadership
- Pope: Leo XIV
- Bishop: Juan Ignacio González Errázuriz
- Metropolitan Archbishop: Celestino Aós Braco, OFM Cap

Website
- www.obispadodesanbernardo.cl

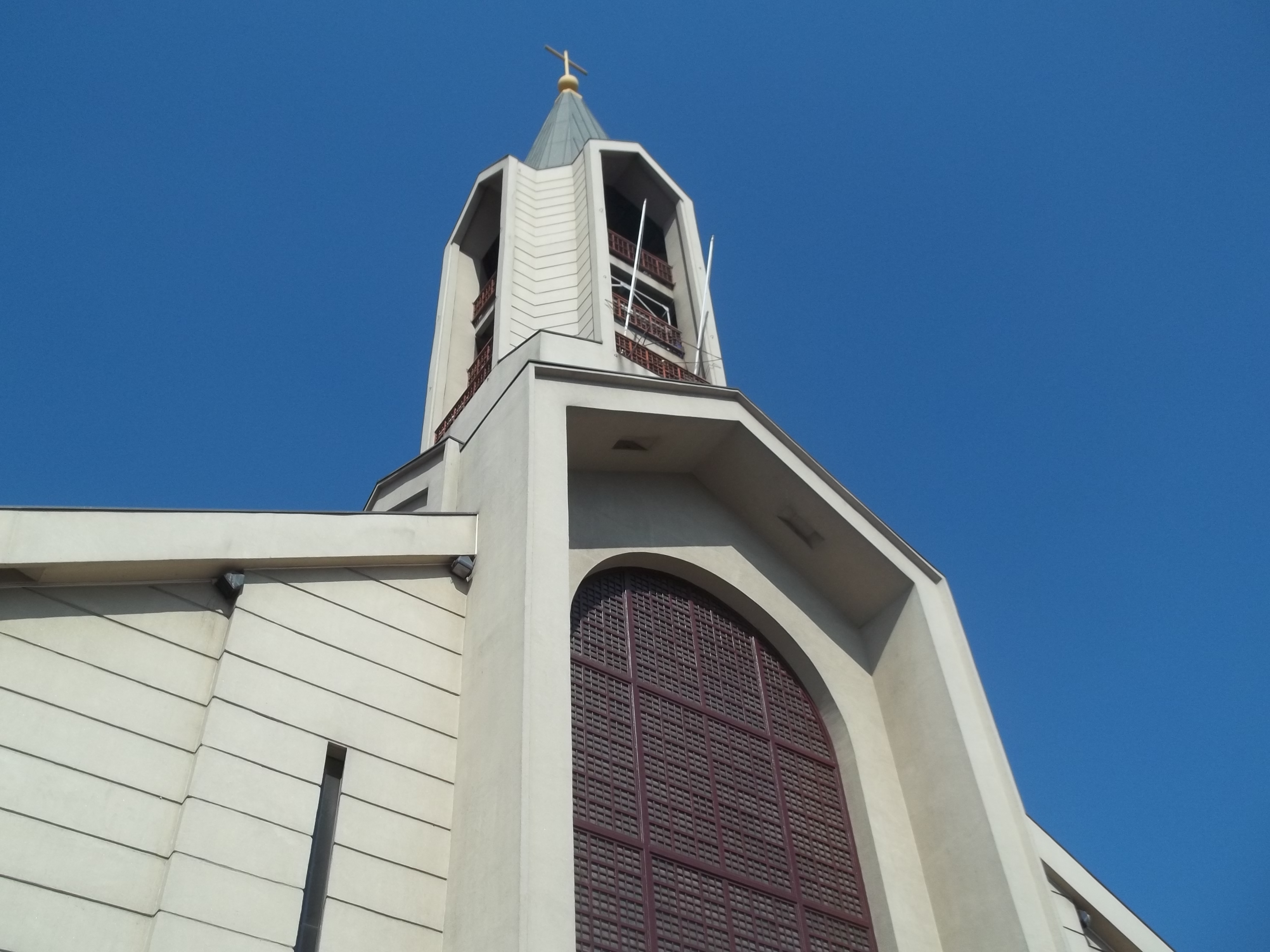
Catedral de San Bernardo

The Roman Catholic Diocese of San Bernardo (Latin: Sancti Bernardi) is a diocese located in the city of San Bernardo in the ecclesiastical province of Santiago de Chile in Chile.

== History ==
- 13 July 1987: Established as Diocese of San Bernardo from the Metropolitan Archdiocese of Santiago de Chile

== Leadership ==
- Bishops of San Bernardo (Roman rite), in reverse chronological order
  - Bishop Juan Ignacio González Errázuriz (2003.10.10 – present)
  - Bishop Orozimbo Fuenzalida y Fuenzalida (1987.07.13 – 2003.10.10)

== Sources ==
- GCatholic.org
- Catholic Hierarchy
- Diocese website
