= Marta Canales =

Chilean musician (1893–1986)

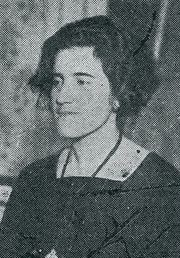
- Marta Canales in 1925
- Born: Marta Canales Pizarro; 17 July 1893; Santiago, Chile
- Died: 6 December 1986 (aged 93); Santiago, Chile
- Occupations: Choral conductor, composer, violinist

Marta Canales Pizarro (17 July 1893 – 6 December 1986) was a Chilean violinist, choral conductor, and composer. During her youth, she performed in a chamber ensemble with her brothers and was involved with the Bach Society, which had been co-founded by her brother. As a composer, the majority of her work had religious themes, and was inspired by the Baroque and Renaissance eras.

In recognition of her compositions, Canales was awarded first prize at the Latin American Exhibition in 1929. She additionally founded two women's choirs dedicated to sacred polyphony.

== Early life and education ==
Marta Canales Pizarro was born in Santiago on 17 July 1893, and was the eldest of five children. Her brother Ricardo was one of the founders of the Bach Society chorus, which she and her other brothers later joined, although Canales was never officially classed as a member. She also founded and lead a chamber ensemble with her brothers, that was active from 1916 to 1920, and they often performed at the society's meetings held at their home.

In addition to performing with her brothers, Canales studied composition, counterpoint and harmony privately with Luigi Stefano Giarda and violin with Luis Gervino. She officially made her debut as a violinist at the age of eleven playing Mendelssohn's "Concerto".

== Career ==
The majority of Canales' compositions were choral works influenced by the Baroque and Renaissance periods, featuring predominantly religious themes. In 1933, she released the Madrigales teresianos, an unaccompanied choral piece and her most widely distributed composition. Canales donated the piece's manuscript, which had been decorated with Carmelite and Teresian symbols, to a Carmelite monastery. As a result, the monastery made Canales a sister of the confraternity. Also in 1933, she founded a women's choir that specialised in sacred polyphony. She later started a second women's choir in 1947, and eventually conducted choirs herself.

Canales wrote Misa de navidad in 1919 for chorus and orchestra, followed by Misa Eucaristía in 1922 and Marta y María in 1929. During the same year as the latter, she was awarded the winning prize for composing at the Latin American Exhibition in Seville. In 1937, she composed the unaccompanied choral piece Misa gregoriana. Canales and her sisters were also involved with the Musical Society for the Blind organisation.

According to Raquel Bustos, Canales composed at least 43 pieces; however, only three were ever officially printed.

== Later life and death ==
Canales died in Santiago on 6 December 1986, at the age of 93.

== Works ==
Selected works include:

- "Marta y María", oratorio for soloists, chorus, organ and string orchestra (1929)
- "Misa de Eucaristía" for four mixed voices, chorus and string orchestra (1930)
- "Misa de Navidad" for mixed chorus of four voices and orchestra (1930)
- "Misa en estilo gregoriano" for voice and organ (1933)
- "Madrigales Teresianos", collection of twelve chorals, four mixed voices on the poetry of St. Teresa of Jesus (1933)
- "Himnos y cantos sacros en estilo gregoriano" for voice and organ (1936–1940)
- "Elevación", poem for organ, harp and string orchestra
- "Cuatro canciones de cuna" for four voice choirs
- "Dos canciones" for four equal voices
- "Cantares Chilenos", collection of ten tunes, harmonized choruses equal voices, drawn from folklore (1946)
- "Villancicos", collection of fifty traditional Christmas songs from the folklore or tradition of different nations with harmonized choruses for four equal voices (1946)

== Sources ==
- Sadie, Julie Anne; Samuel, Rhian (1994). The Norton/Grove dictionary of women composers. W. W. Norton & Company. p. 101. ISBN 978-0-393-03487-5.
- Andrade Schnettler, Paulina (2024). "Canon, Gender, Power. On the creation of a male canon and female strategies of authorship and self-representation in Chilean classical music of the 20th century". Musikalische Schrift und Gender. ISBN 9783837670226.
