= Orozimbo Fuenzalida =

- Bishop of San Bernardo
- Church: Catholic Church
- Diocese: Diocese of San Bernardo
- In office: 13 July 1987 – 10 October 2003
- Predecessor: Diocese erected
- Successor: Juan Ignacio González Errázuriz
- Previous posts: Bishop of Los Ángeles (1970-1987); Titular Bishop of Burca (1968-1970); Prelate of Calama (1968-1970)

Orders
- Ordination: 10 March 1951 by Eduardo Larraín Cordovez
- Consecration: 19 May 1968 by Francisco de Borja Valenzuela Ríos

Personal details
- Born: Orozimbo Fuenzalida y Fuenzalida; 22 May 1925 Rancagua, O'Higgins Province, Chile
- Died: 27 March 2013 (aged 87)

Orozimbo Fuenzalida y Fuenzalida (22 May 1925 – 27 March 2013) was the Catholic bishop of the Diocese of San Bernardo, Chile.

Ordained to the priesthood in 1951, Fuenzalida y Fuenzalida was named bishop in 1968 and retired in 2003.

He was Prelate of Calama and Titular Bishop of Burca from 1968 until 1970, Bishop of Santa María de Los Ángeles from 1970 until 1987, and Bishop of San Bernardo from 1987 until 2003.
