= Francisco Javier Prado Aránguiz =

Chilean priest (1929–2020)

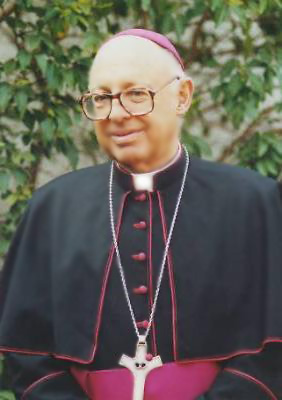
Francisco Javier Prado Aránguiz

Francisco Javier Prado Aránguiz (8 March 1929 – 23 June 2020) was a Chilean Roman Catholic bishop.

Prado Aránguiz was born in Chile and was ordained to the priesthood in 1953. He served as bishop of the Roman Catholic Diocese of Iquique, Chile, from 1984 to 1988. He then served as auxiliary bishop of the Roman Catholic Diocese of Valparaiso, Chile, from 1988 to 1993 and as bishop of the Roman Catholic Diocese of Rancagua, Chile, from 1993 to 2004.
