= Juan Ignacio González Errázuriz =

Chilean Catholic bishop (born 1956)

His Excellency, the Most Reverend Juan Ignacio González Errázuriz
- Bishop of San Bernardo
- Appointed: 10 October 2003
- In office: 22 November 2003
- Predecessor: Orozimbo Fuenzalida y Fuenzalida

Orders
- Ordination: 13 June 1993
- Consecration: 22 November 2003 by Bishop Orozimbo Fuenzalida y Fuenzalida

Personal details
- Born: July 5, 1956 (age 70) Santiago de Chile, Chile
- Education: Pontifical Catholic University of Chile
- Motto: Duc in Altum et Laxate Retia (Launch Out into the Deep and Cast Down Nets)
- Coat of arms

Juan Ignacio González Errázuriz (born 5 July 1956) is the Roman Catholic bishop of San Bernardo, Chile. He is a member of the Prelature of Opus Dei.
