= St. Matthew's Cathedral, Osorno =

Coordinates: 40.5738°S 73.1345°W

St. Matthew's Cathedral
- Catedral San Mateo Apóstol
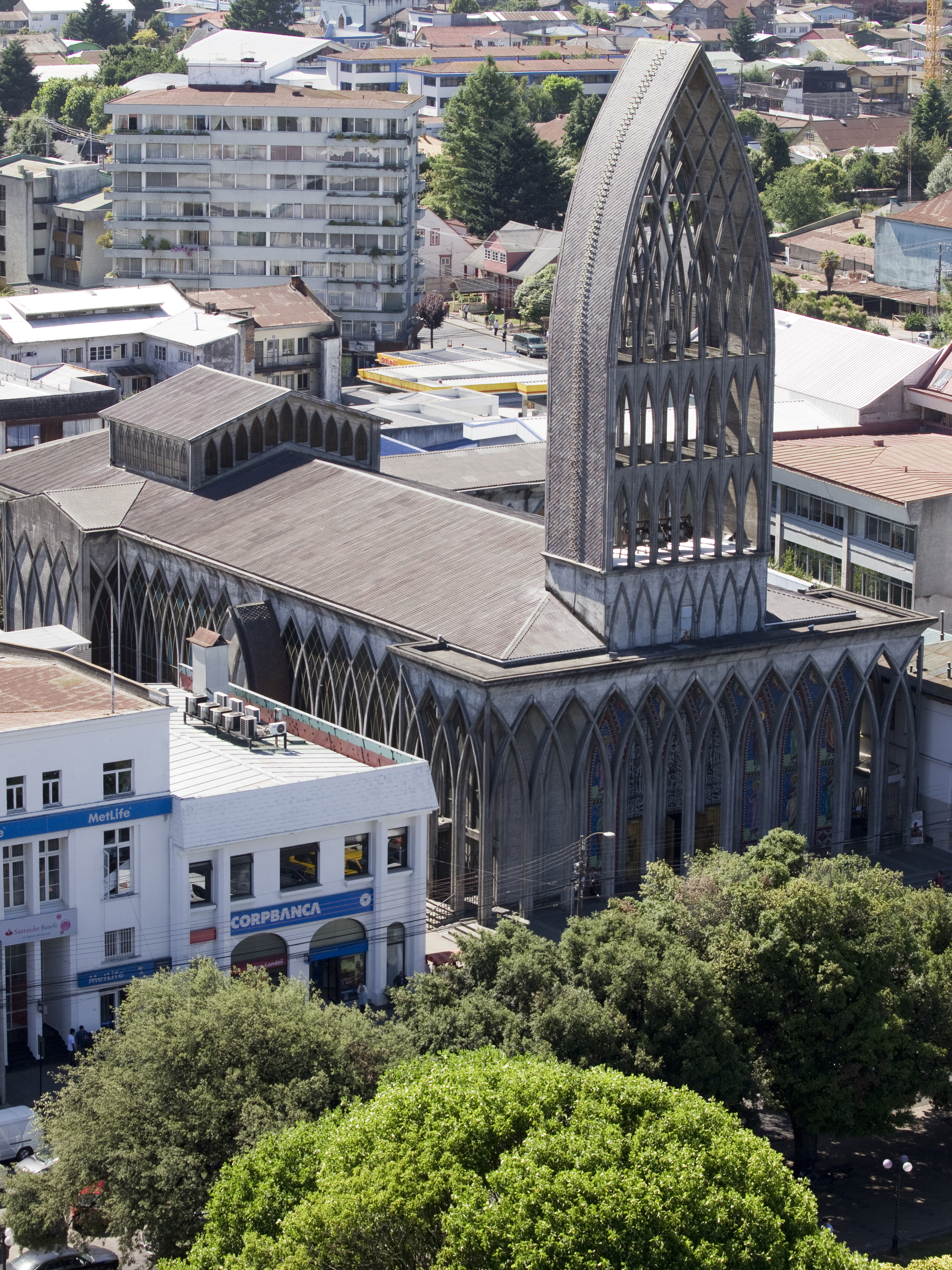
- St. Matthew's Cathedral
- Location: Osorno
- Country: Chile
- Denomination: Catholic

History
- Consecrated: November 24, 1977

The Cathedral of St. Matthew, (Spanish: Catedral San Mateo Apóstol) in Osorno, Chile is the cathedral of the Roman Catholic Diocese of Osorno.

Also known simply as Osorno Cathedral, the cathedral church lies in the vicinity of the Plaza de Armas. Designed by Chilean architect León Prieto Casanova, it is considered an architectural jewel of Gothic Revival style, and is a major tourist attraction in the city. It noted for its imposing 45-meter tower and its large and colorful mosaics and stained-glass windows with representations of biblical figures.

The original cathedral was built in 1577. The 1960 earthquake imposed serious structural damage to it, and it was demolished as a result. The first stone of the new cathedral was blessed and laid on May 1, 1962, and 15 years later, on November 24, 1977, the current building was consecrated.

== See also ==
- Catholic Church in Chile

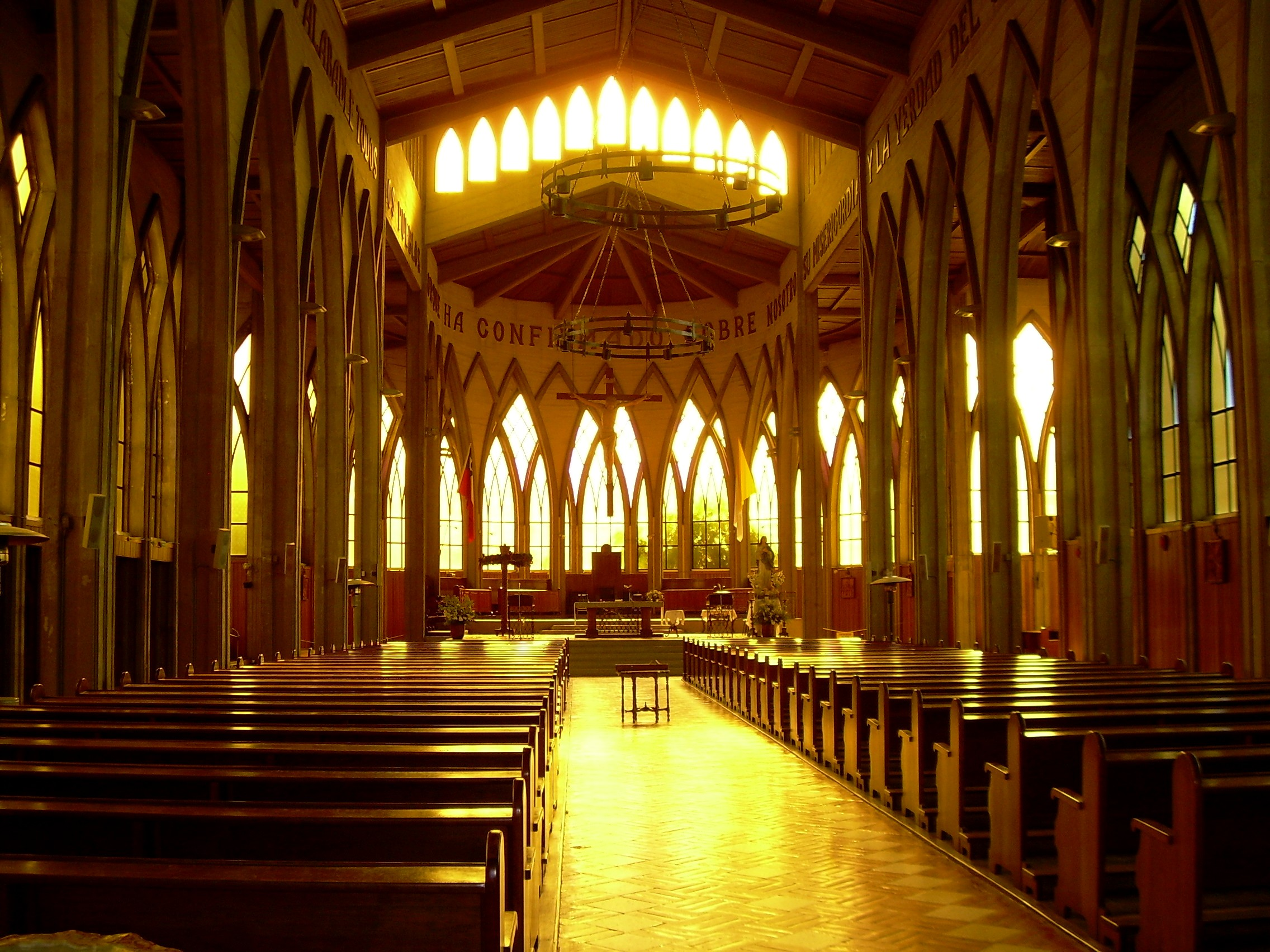
Interior
