= Diocese of Santa María de Los Ángeles =

Catholic ecclesiastical territory

Coordinates: 37.4703°S 72.3525°W

Diocese of Santa María de Los Ángeles Dioecesis Sanctae Mariae Angelorum Diócesis de Santa María de Los Angeles

Catholic

Location
- Country: Chile
- Ecclesiastical province: Concepción
- Metropolitan: Concepción

Statistics
- Area: 13,454 km^{2} (5,195 sq mi)
- Population: Total; Catholics: (as of 2023); 383,850; 230,240 (60.0%)
- Parishes: 25

Information
- Denomination: Catholic Church
- Sui iuris church: Latin Church
- Rite: Roman Rite
- Established: 20 June 1959; 67 years ago
- Cathedral: St. Mary of the Angels Cathedral
- Patron saint: Our Lady of Angels
- Secular priests: 43 (36 Diocesan, 7 Religious Orders)

Current leadership
- Pope: Leo XIV
- Bishop: Cristián Castro Toovey
- Metropolitan Archbishop: Sergio Hernán Pérez de Arce Arraigada, SS.CC.
- Bishops emeritus: Felipe Bacarreza

Website
- www.obispadolosangeles.cl

The Roman Catholic Diocese of Santa María de Los Ángeles (Latin: Sanctae Mariae Angelorum) is a diocese located in the city of Los Ángeles in the ecclesiastical province of Concepción in Chile.

== History ==
- 20 June 1959: Established as Diocese of Los Ángeles from the Metropolitan Archdiocese of Concepción and the Roman Catholic Diocese of Temuco

== Bishops ==
- Bishops of Santa María de Los Ángeles (Roman rite), in reverse chronological order
  - Cristián Castro Toovey (2024.03.23 – Present)
  - Felipe Bacarreza (2006.01.07 – 2024.03.23), retired
  - Miguel Caviedes Medina (1994.02.19 – 2006.01.07), retired
  - Adolfo Rodríguez Vidal (1988.07.06 – 1994.02.19), resigned
  - Orozimbo Fuenzalida y Fuenzalida (1970.02.26 – 1987.07.13), appointed Bishop of San Bernardo
  - Alejandro Durán Moreira (1966.03.31 – 1970.02.02), appointed Bishop of Rancagua
  - Luis Yáñez Ruiz Tagle, O.F.M. (1964.03.21 – 1965.11.21)
  - Manuel Sánchez Beguiristáin (1959.12.17 – 1963.06.25), appointed Archbishop of Concepción

=== Other priest of this diocese who became bishop ===
- Tomás Carrasco Cortés (2001-2023), appointed Bishop of San Juan Bautista de Calama
- Francisco Javier Stegmeier Schmidlin (1988-2009), appointed Bishop of Villarrica

== Sources ==
- GCatholic.org
- Catholic Hierarchy
- Diocese website
